= Pompeo Batoni =

Italian painter (1708–1787)

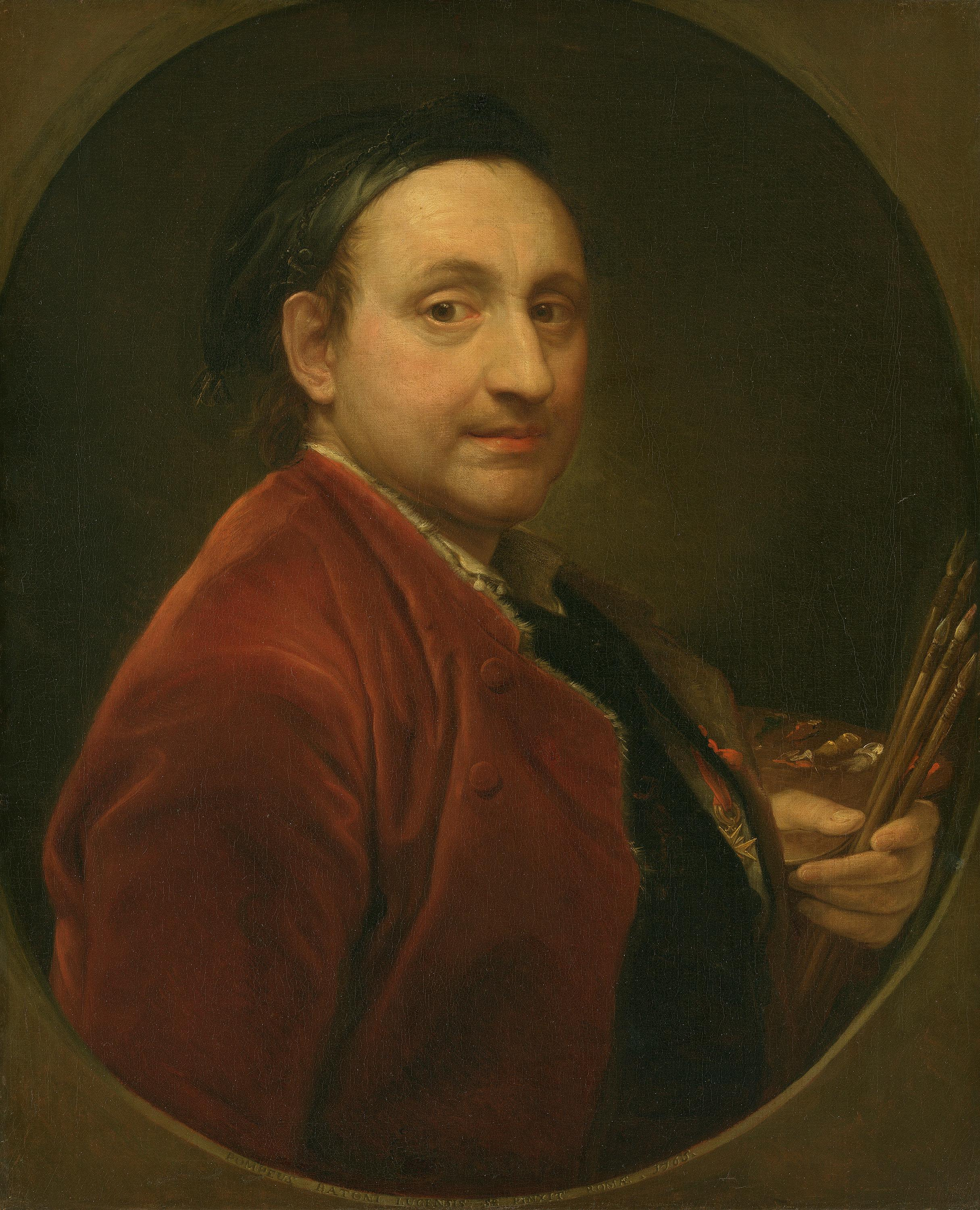
- Self-portrait, 1765
- Born: Pompeo Girolamo Batoni; 25 January 1708; Lucca, Republic of Lucca
- Died: 4 February 1787 (aged 79); Rome, Papal States
- Education: Agostino Masucci, Sebastiano Conca
- Known for: painter
- Spouse(s): Caterina Setti, Lucia Fattori

Pompeo Girolamo Batoni (25 January 1708 – 4 February 1787) was an Italian painter who displayed a solid technical knowledge in his portrait work and in his numerous allegorical and mythological pictures. The high number of foreign visitors travelling throughout Italy and reaching Rome during their "Grand Tour" led the artist to specialise in portraits.

Batoni won international fame largely thanks to his customers, mostly British and Anglo-Irish gentlemen, whom he portrayed, often with famous Italian landscapes in the background. Such Grand Tour portraits by Batoni were in British private collections, thus ensuring the genre's popularity in Great Britain. One generation later, Sir Joshua Reynolds would take up this tradition and become the leading English portrait painter. Although Batoni was considered the best Italian painter of his time, contemporary chronicles mention his rivalry with Anton Raphael Mengs.

In addition to art-loving nobility, Batoni's subjects included the kings and queens of Poland, Portugal, and Prussia; the Holy Roman Emperors Joseph II and Leopold II (a fact which earned him noble dignity); the popes Benedict XIV, Clement XIII, and Pius VI, Elector Karl Theodor of Bavaria; and many more. He also received numerous commissions for altarpieces for churches (in Rome, Brescia, Lucca and Parma, for example) as well as for mythological and allegorical subjects.

Batoni's style took inspiration and incorporated elements of classical antiquity, French Rococo, Bolognese classicism, and the work of artists such as Nicolas Poussin, Claude Lorrain, and especially Raphael. As such, Pompeo Batoni is considered a precursor of Neoclassicism.

== Biography ==
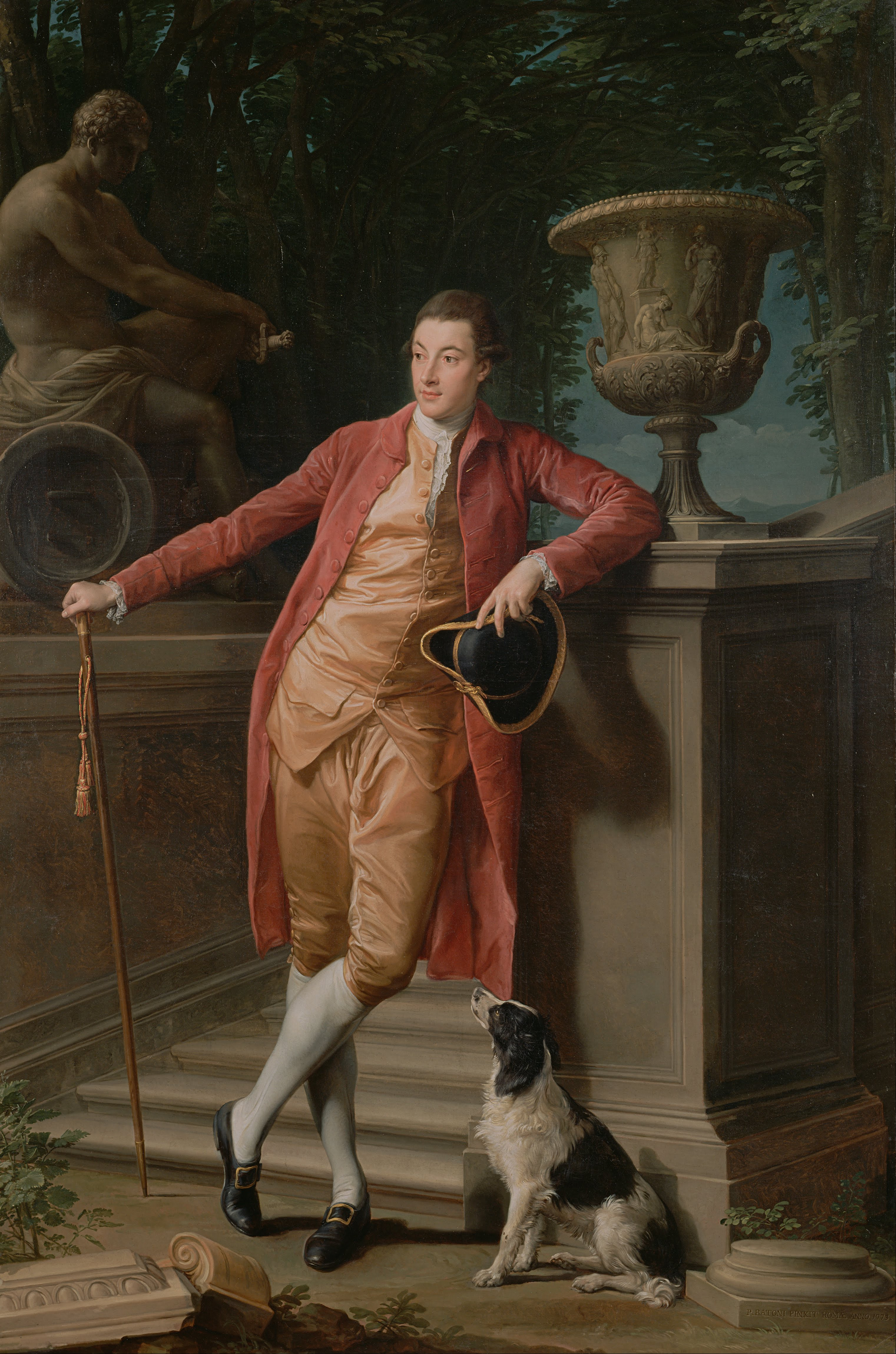
John Talbot, later 1st Earl Talbot, 1773. J. Paul Getty Museum, Los Angeles

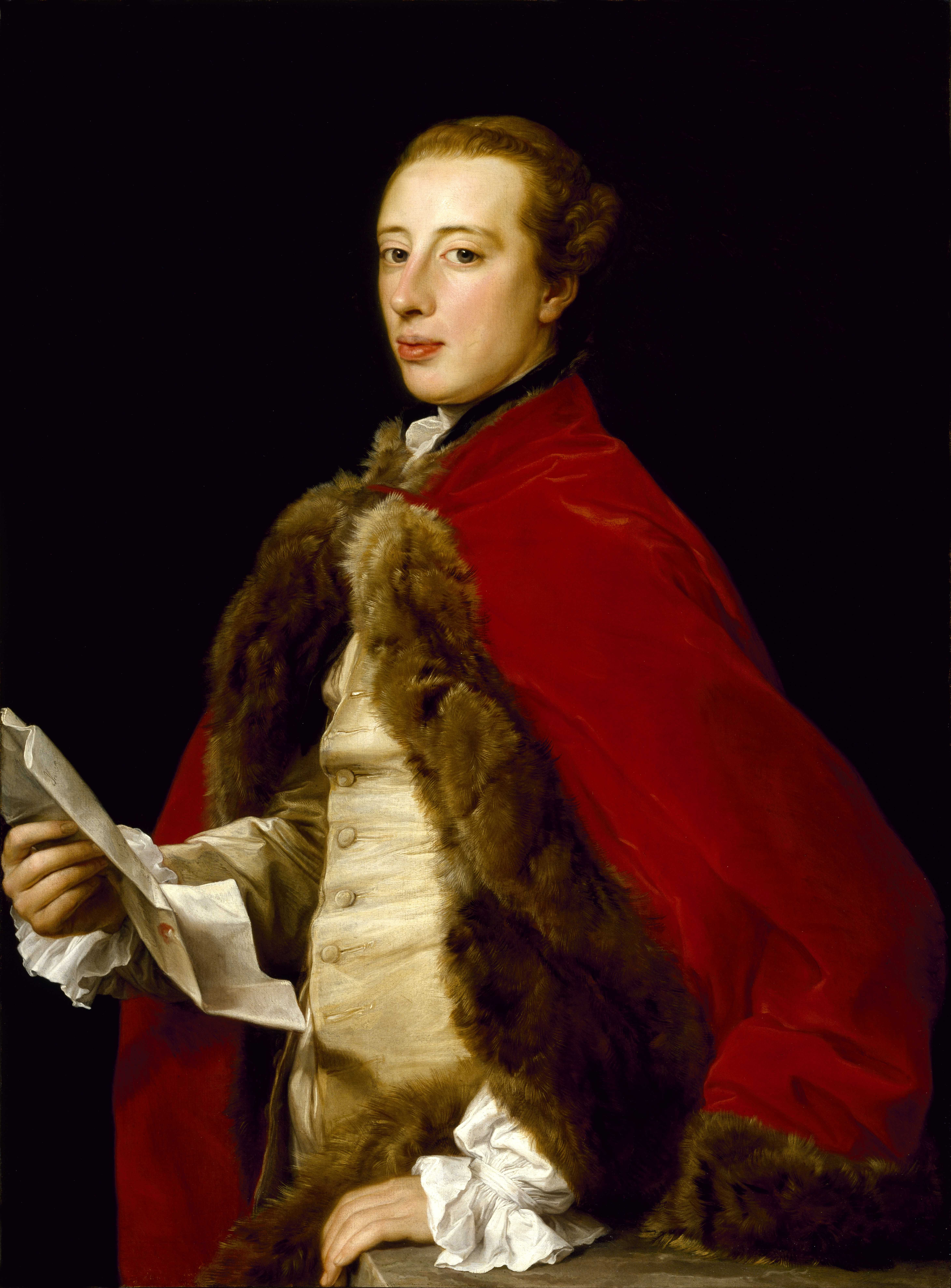
William Fermor, 1758. Museum of Fine Arts, Houston

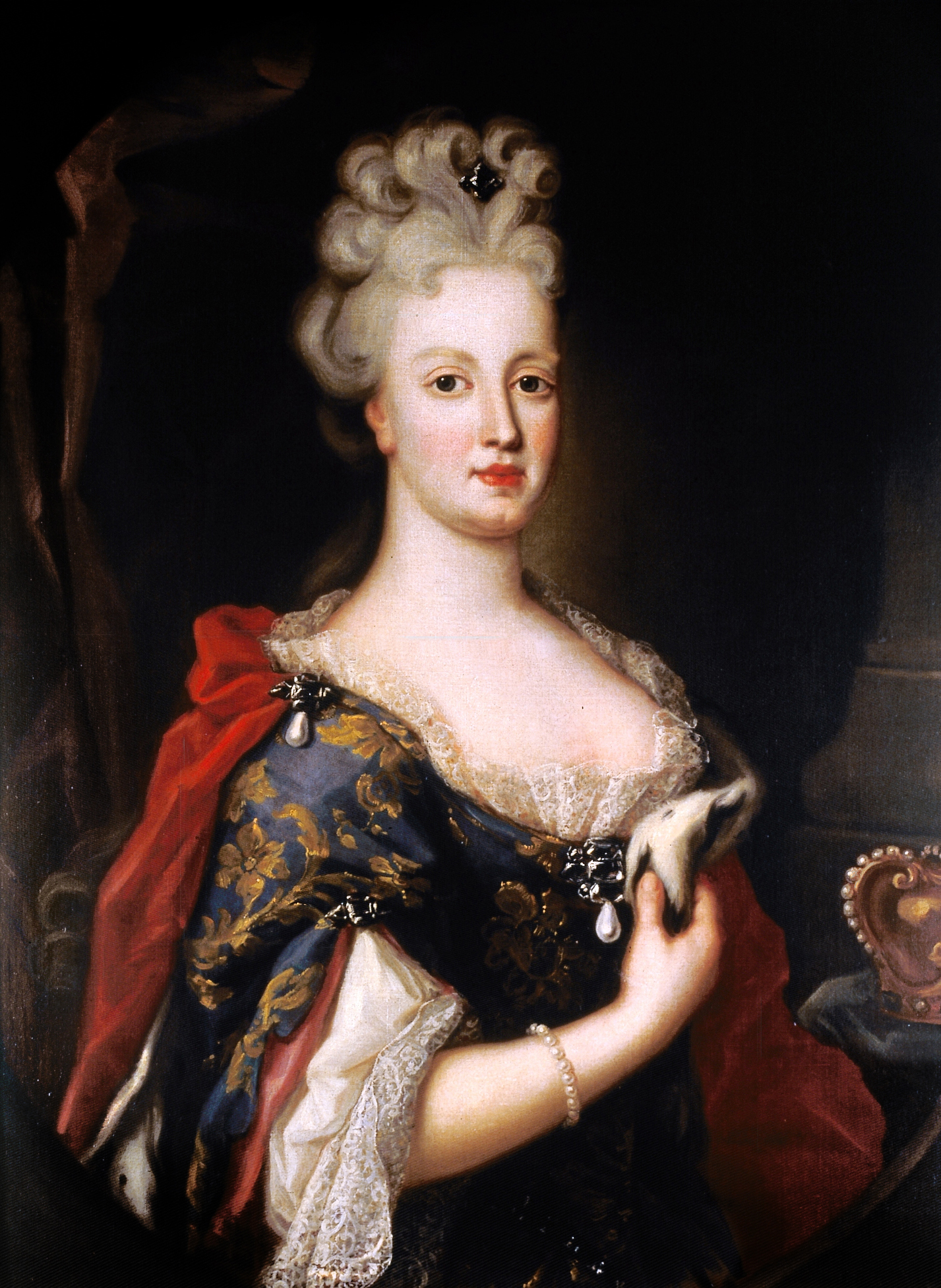
Portrait of Maria Anna of Austria, Queen of Portugal

=== Early life ===
Pompeo Batoni was born in Lucca, the son of a goldsmith, Paolino Batoni, and his wife, Chiara Sesti. On 5 February 1708, he was baptised in the Basilica of San Frediano. He moved to Rome in 1727, and apprenticed with Agostino Masucci, Sebastiano Conca and/or Francesco Imperiali (1679–1740).

=== Career ===
Batoni owed his first independent commission to the rains that struck Rome in April 1732. Seeking shelter from a sudden storm, Forte Gabrielli di Gubbio, count of Baccaresca, took cover under the portico of the Palazzo dei Conservatori on the Capitoline Hill. Here, the nobleman met the young artist who was drawing the ancient bas-reliefs and the paintings of the staircase of the palace.

Impressed by his skill and the purity of the design, Gabrielli asked Batoni to see some of his works, and when conducted to the painter's studio he was so awed by his talent that he offered him to paint a new altarpiece for the chapel of his family in San Gregorio Magno al Celio, the Madonna on a Throne with Child and four Saints and Blesseds of the Gabrielli family (1732–33), a second version of which (1736) is now at the Gallerie dell'Accademia in Venice. The Gabrielli Madonna obtained general admiration, and by the early 1740s Batoni started to receive other independent commissions. His celebrated painting, The Ecstasy of Saint Catherine of Siena (1743) illustrates his academic refinement of the late-Baroque style. Another masterpiece, his Fall of Simon Magus was painted initially for the St Peter's Basilica.

Batoni became a highly-fashionable painter in Rome, particularly after his rival, the proto-neoclassicist Anton Raphael Mengs, departed for Spain in 1761. Batoni befriended Winckelmann and, like him, aimed in his painting to the restrained classicism of painters from earlier centuries, such as Raphael and Poussin, rather than to the work of the Venetian artists then in vogue. Commenting on Batoni, the art historians Boni and de Rossi said of Batoni and Mengs, the other prominent painter in Rome during the second half of the 18th century, that Mengs was made painter by philosophy: Batoni by nature...(Batoni) was more painter than philosopher, (Mengs) more philosopher than painter. In 1741, he was inducted into the Accademia di San Luca.

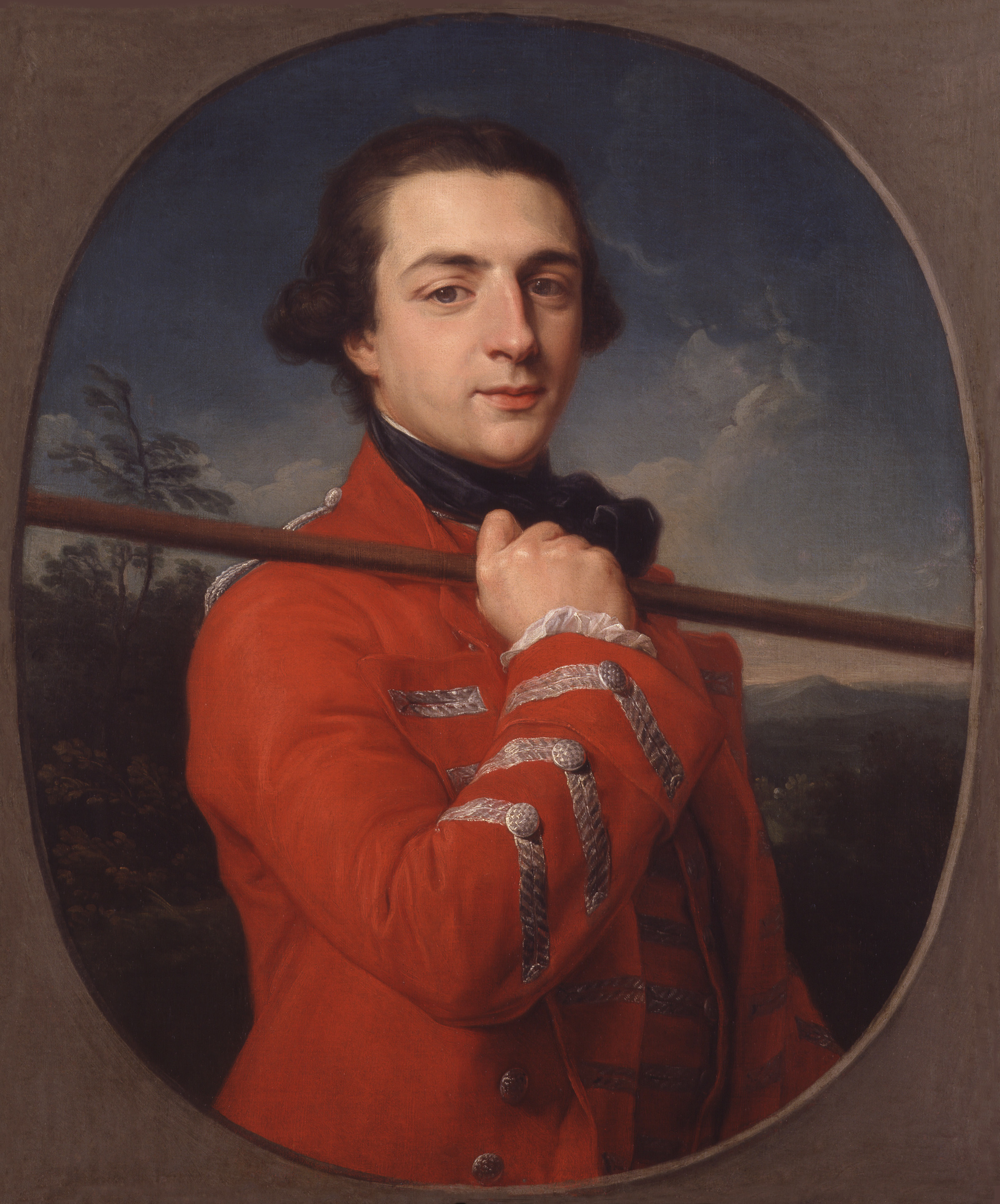
Portrait of the Duke of Grafton 1762, National Portrait Gallery, London. Grafton went on to become Prime Minister.

He was greatly in demand for portraits, particularly by the British travelling through Rome, who took pleasure in commissioning standing portraits set in the milieu of antiquities, ruins, and works of art. There are records of over 200 portraits by Batoni of visiting British patrons alone.

Such "Grand Tour" portraits by Batoni came to proliferate in the British private collections, thus ensuring the genre's popularity in the United Kingdom, where Reynolds would become its leading practitioner. In 1760, the painter Benjamin West, while visiting Rome would complain that Italian artists "talked of nothing, looked at nothing but the works of Pompeo Batoni".

In 1769, the double portrait of the emperor Joseph II and his brother Pietro Leopoldo I (then Grand Duke of Tuscany, later emperor Leopold II), won an Austrian nobility for Batoni. He also portrayed Pope Clement XIII and Pope Pius VI.

It is believed he painted the staffage (background figures) for some of the landscape paintings of Hendrik Frans van Lint.

According to a rumour, before dying in Rome in 1787, he bequeathed his palette and brushes to Jacques-Louis David, to whom, full of admiration for his Oath of the Horatii, Batoni would have confessed: "Only the two of us can call themselves painters".

=== Death ===
His late years were affected by declining health; he died in Rome in 1787, at the age of 79, and was buried at his parish church of San Lorenzo in Lucina. Batoni's last will executors were cardinal Filippo Carandini and James Byres, the Scottish antiquary, but the estate was insolvent, and his widow was forced by the events to petition the Grand Duke of Tuscany, whom Batoni had painted in 1769, for financial assistance, offering in exchange her husband's unfinished self-portrait, today at the Uffizi in Florence.

=== Personal life ===
From 1759, Batoni lived in a large house at 25 Via Bocca di Leone in Rome, which included a studio as well as exhibition rooms and a drawing academy. He was married twice, in 1729 to Caterina Setti (died 1742), and then in 1747 to Lucia Fattori, and he had twelve children; three of his sons assisted in his studio. His daughters Rufina, who died on 27 April 1784 at age 27, and Maria Benedetta were accomplished singers.

== Influence ==
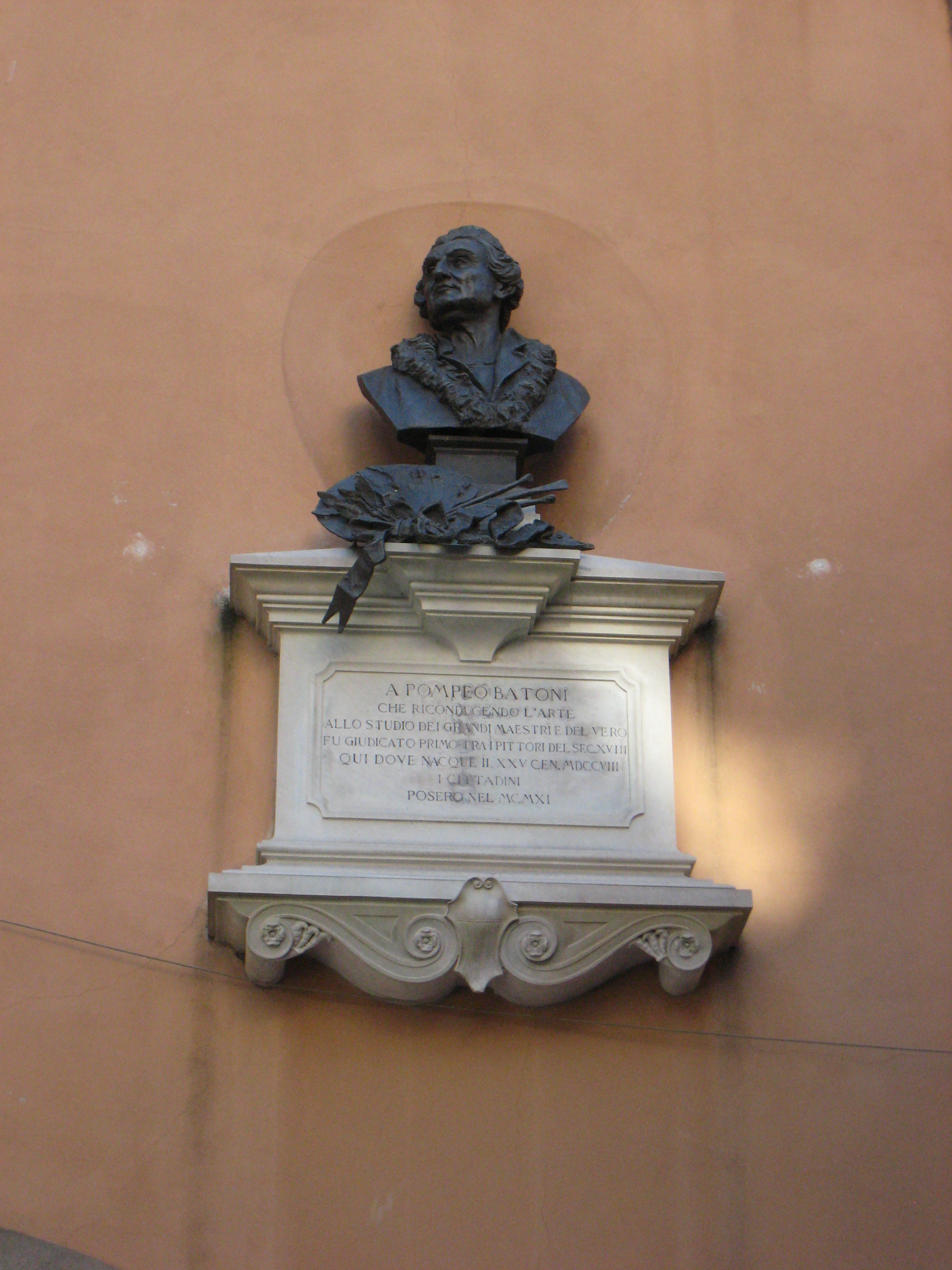
Bust on the wall of Batoni's birthplace

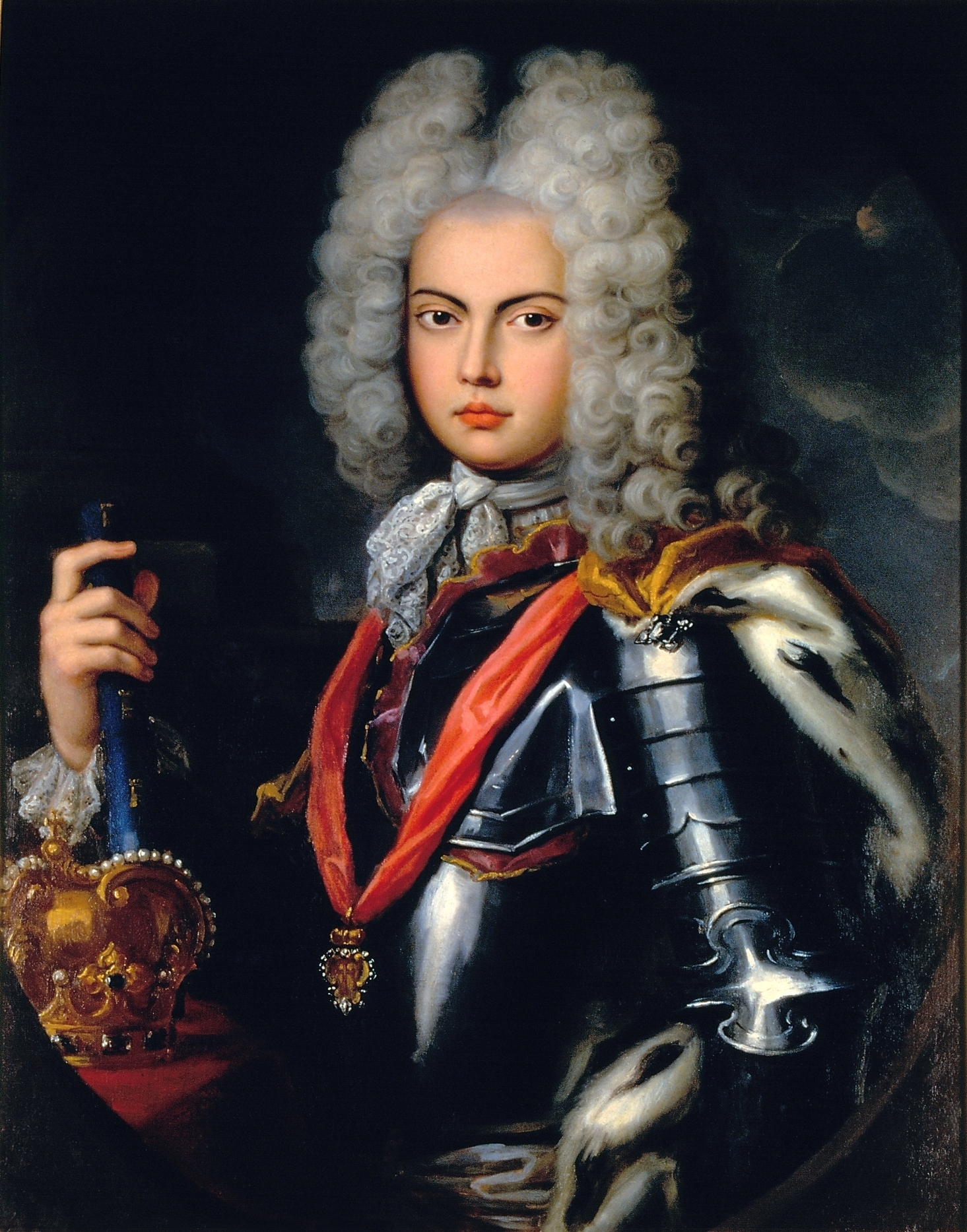
Portrait of John V, King of Portugal, aged about 17. Palace of Ajuda, Lisbon.

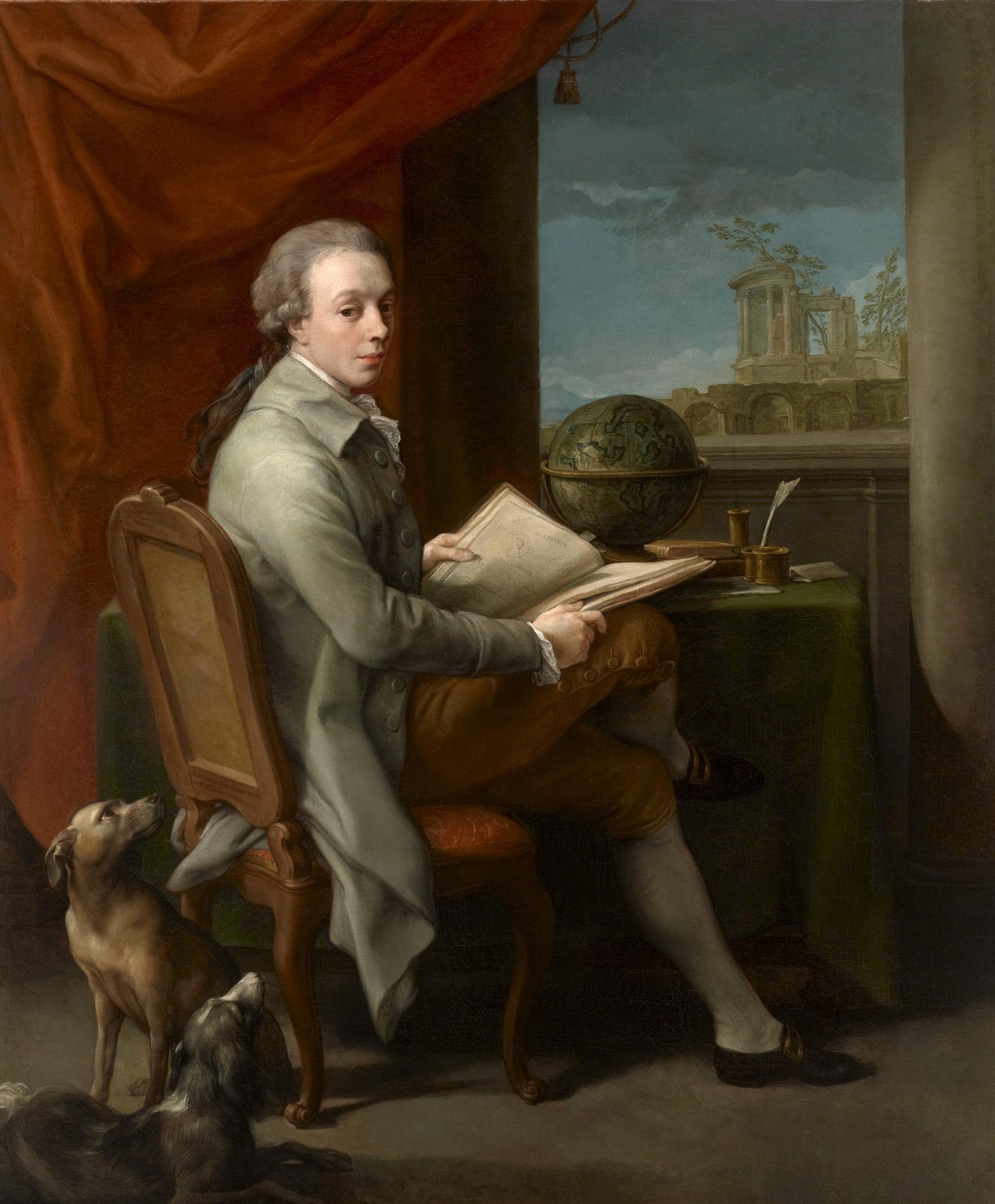
Thomas Tayleur, First Marquess of Headfort (1782)

Vincenzo Camuccini is said to have frequented his studio. The Italian Angelo Banchero of Sestri Ponente, Benigno Bossi of Arcisate, Paolo Girolamo Brusco of Genoa, Antonio Cavallucci of Sermoneta, Marco Cavicchia of Arpino, Adamo Chiusole, Antonio Concioli of Pergola, Domenico Conti Bazzani of Mantua, Domenico Corvi of Viterbo, Felice Giani of San Sebastiano Curone, Gregorio Giusti of Pistoia, Gaspare Landi of Piacenza, Nicola Antonio Monti of Ascoli Piceno, Giuseppe Pirovani of Pavia, Pasquale Ciaramponi of Treia, and Carlo Giuseppe Ratti of Savona, were among his students or were influenced by his work. Among the foreigners, Henry Benbridge of Philadelphia, Maria Cosway of Florence, Ivan Martos of Poltava, Johann Gottlieb Puhlmann of Zieko, and Johannes Wiedewelt of Copenhagen were among Batoni's most notable followers.

== Criticism and exhibitions ==
Batoni was among the most celebrated Italian painters in his day, and his patrons and collectors included royals and aristocrats from all over Europe. His fame and reputation decreased over the 19th century until 20th-century scholars dedicated their critical attention to him and again revived his fame among the general public. Among them, the following can be noted: the German Ernst Emmerling, the Englishmen John Steegman and Benedict Nicolson, the Italian Isa Belli Barsali, and the Americans Anthony M. Clark and Edgar Peters Bowron.

The first exhibition devoted to Pompeo Batoni was held in his hometown of Lucca in 1967, after which two others were organised in London and New York in 1982. He was again the subject of a major exhibition at the Museum of Fine Arts in Houston, the National Gallery in London, and the Ducal Palace in Lucca in 2007–08.

A portrait of George Oakley Aldrich, a fellow of Merton College, Oxford, from the 1750s, identified in the Bodleian Library in Oxford by art historian Bendor Grosvenor and visual sociology researcher Emma Dabiri, is the subject of an episode of BBC Four's Britain's Lost Masterpieces first broadcast on 30 October 2019. After a full restoration by Simon Gillespie, the programme concludes with a positive attribution to Batoni made by expert in British 18th-century portraiture Prof. Robin Simon.

== List of works ==
=== Allegory and History ===
(In chronological order)

- The Virgin Mary enthroned with saints of the Gabrielli di Gubbio family — (1732–33), San Gregorio al Celio, Rome; and (1736), Gallerie dell'Accademia, Venice
- The five allegories of the Arts — (1740) Städelsches Kunstinstitut, Frankfurt am Main
- Apollo and Two Muses – (1741) Museum of King John III's Palace at Wilanów, Warsaw
- Catherine of Siena in Ecstasy — (1743) Museo di villa Guinigi, Lucca
- Achilles and Lycomedes — (1745) Uffizi, Florence
- Time orders Old Age to destroy Beauty — (1746) National Gallery, London
- Fall of Simon Magus — (1746–1755) St Peter's Basilica, Rome
- Aeneas escaping from Troy — (1750) Sabauda Gallery, Turin
- Vulcan – (1750) National Gallery of Canada, Ottawa
- Cleopatra shows Octavian the bust of Caesar – (1755) Musée des Beaux-Arts de Dijon
- Martyrdom of Saint Lucia — (1759) Real Academia de Bellas Artes de San Fernando, Madrid
- The Holy Family — (1760) Capitoline Museum, Rome
- Diana and Cupid — (1761) Metropolitan Museum of Art, New York
- Madonna — Church of Santa Maria in Monterone, Rome

=== Portraits ===
- Portrait of Giacinta Orsini — (1758)
- Portrait of a Man in a Blue Suit — (1760s) Dallas Museum of Art
- Portrait of Richard Milles — (1760–1770) National Gallery, London
- Portrait of Humphry Morice — (1761) National Gallery, London
- Portrait of Charles Crowle — (1761–1762) Louvre, Paris
- Portrait of the Duke of York — (1764) Royal Collection
- Portrait of Lord Dundas — (1764) Aske Hall, Yorkshire, England
- Portrait of Manuel de Rodas — (1765) Real Academia de Bellas Artes de San Fernando, Madrid
- Portrait of Abbondio Rezzonico — (1766) Galleria Nazionale d'Arte Antica, Rome
- Portrait of Sir Gregory Page Turner — (1768) Manchester Art Gallery
- Portrait of Leopold, Grand Duke of Tuscany — (1768) Private Collection
- Portrait of Thomas Estcourt, Esquire — (1772) John Hay Library, Brown University
- Selfportrait — (1773–1774) Uffizi, Florence
- Portrait of Thomas William Coke — (1774) Holkham Hall, Norfolk, England
- Portrait of a Man (John Scott?) — (1770) National Gallery, London
- Portrait of Pius VI — (1775–1776) Sabauda Gallery, Turin
- Portrait of Douglas, 8th Duke of Hamilton — (1775–1776) Inveraray Castle
- Portrait of Francis Basset — (1778) Real Academia de Bellas Artes de San Fernando, Madrid
- Portrait of Francis Basset 1st Baron of Dunstanville — (1778) Prado Museum, Madrid
- Portrait of George Legge Viscount Lewisham — (1778) Prado Museum, Madrid
- Portrait of Pope Pius VI — (ca.1780) Royal Castle, Warsaw
- Portrait of Pierre André de Suffren — (c.1785)
- Portrait of the Countess Maria Benedetta di San Martino — (1785) Thyssen-Bornemisza Museum, Madrid

== Gallery ==
=== Portraits ===
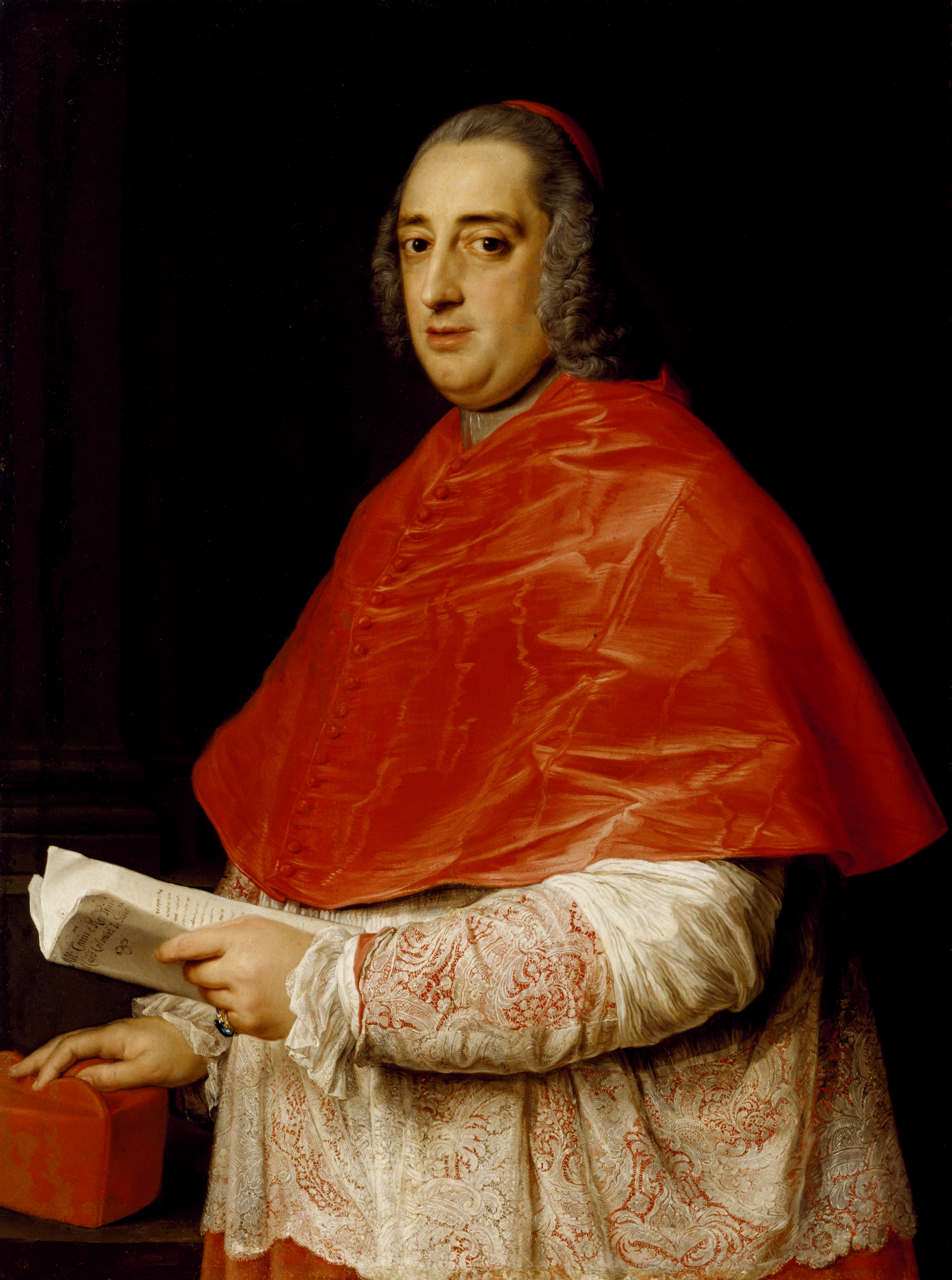
Cardinal Prospero Colonna di Sciarra, c. 1750, Walters Art Museum, Mount Vernon, Baltimore

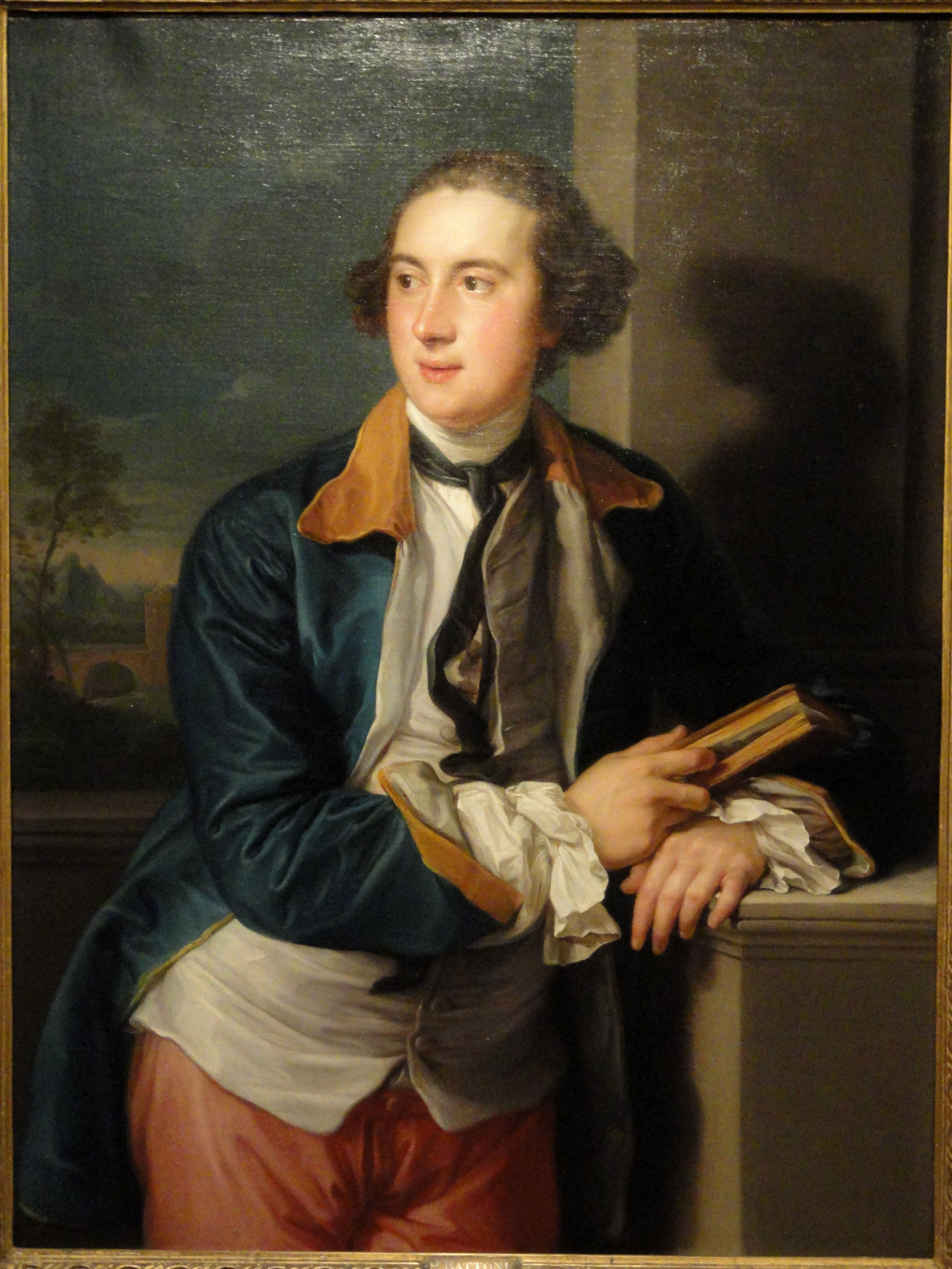
William Legge, 2nd Earl of Dartmouth, c. 1752, Hood Museum of Art, Dartmouth College

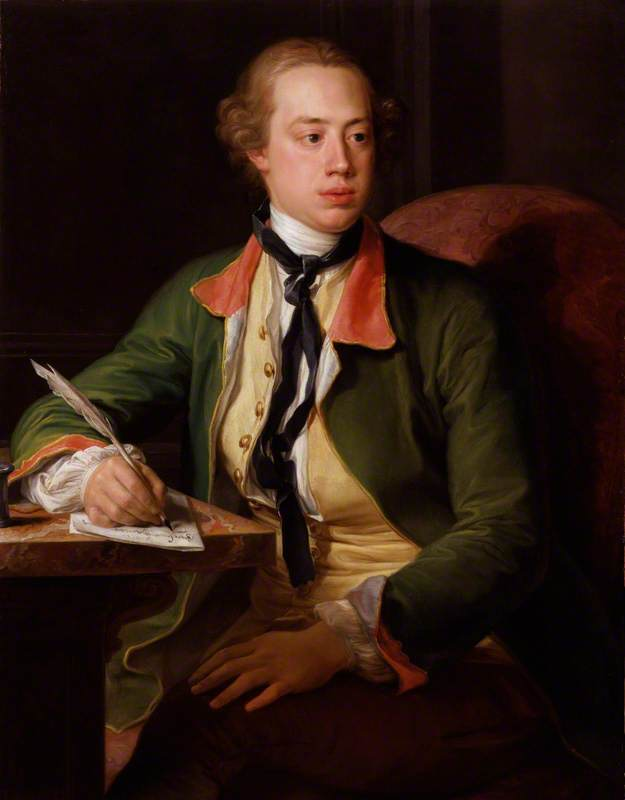
Portrait of Lord North, 1753, National Portrait Gallery, London

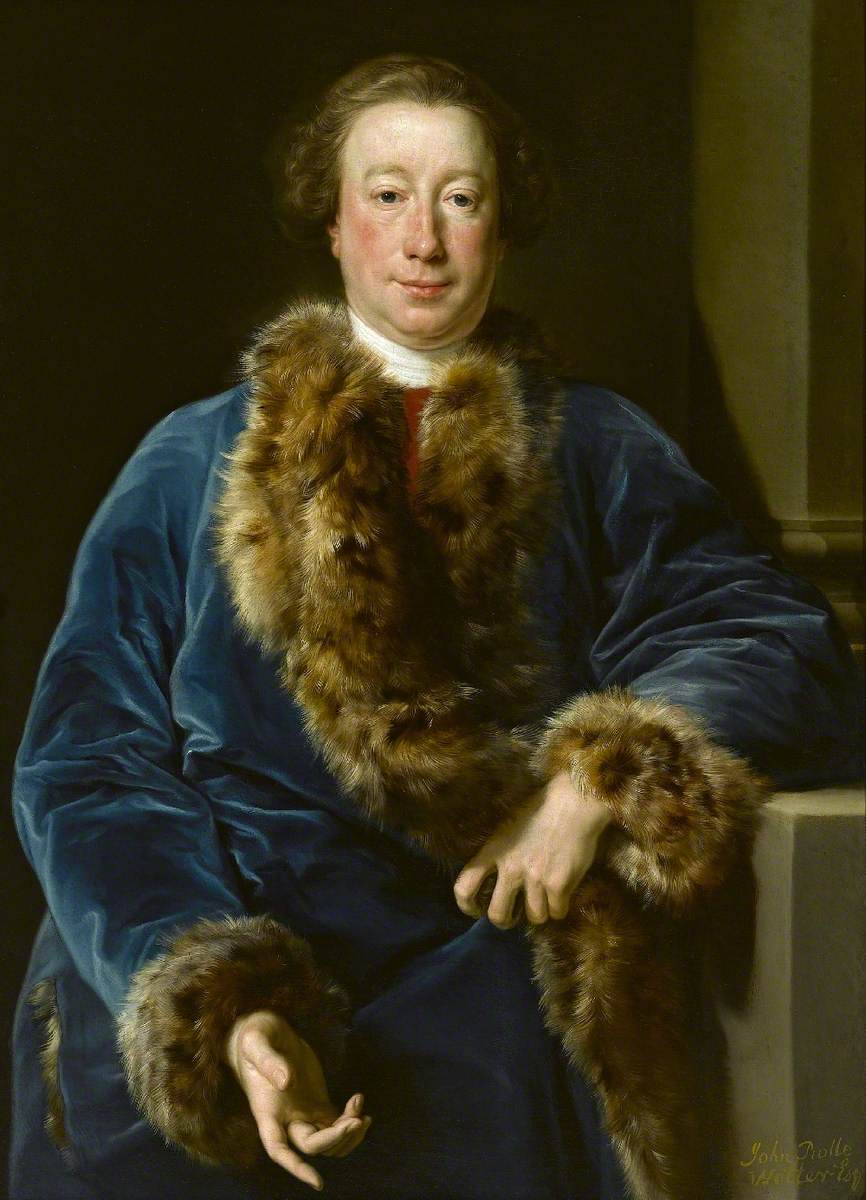
John Rolle Walter, c. 1753, Royal Albert Memorial Museum, Exeter

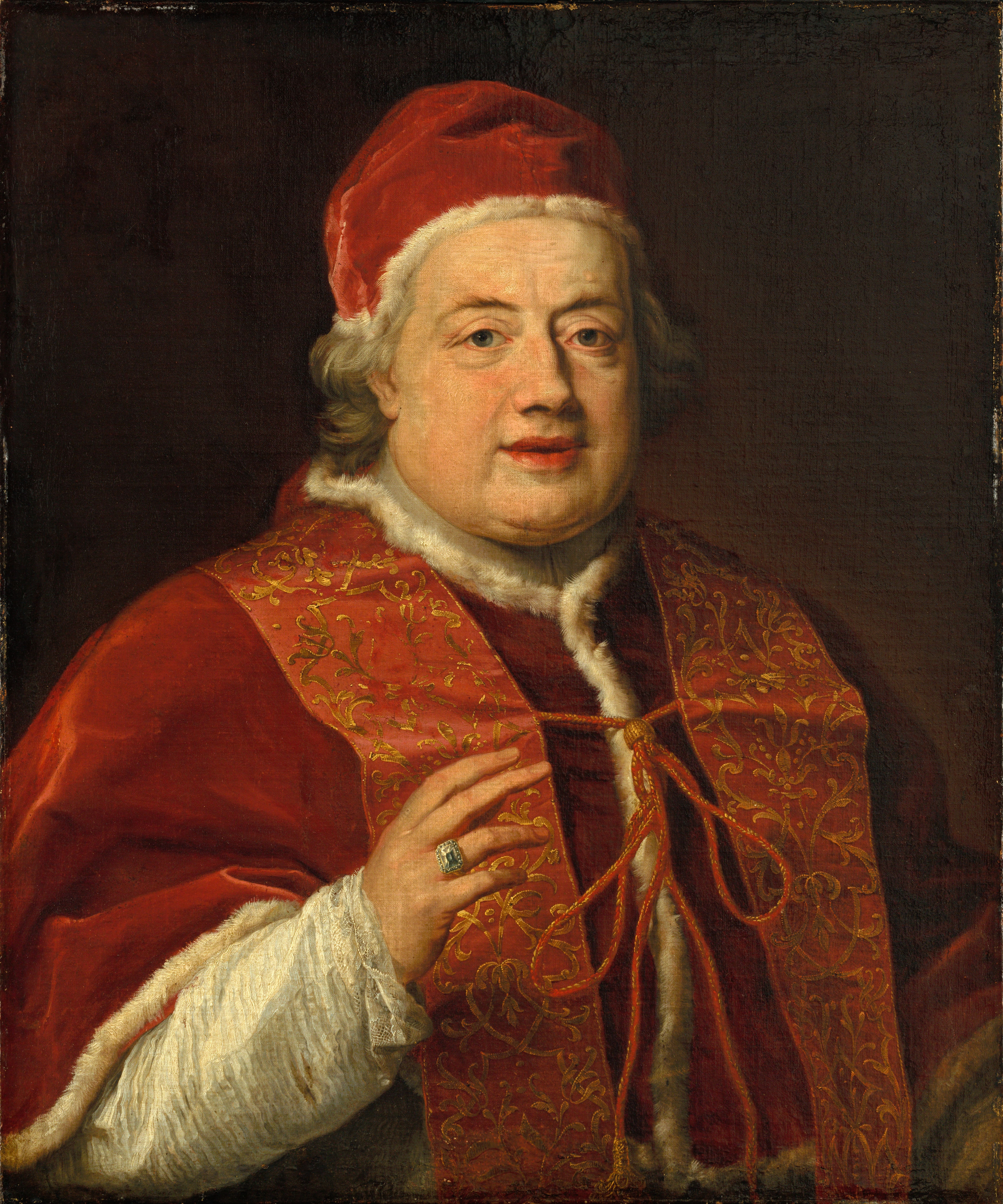
Clement XIII, c. 1758, Gemäldegalerie Alte Meister, Kassel

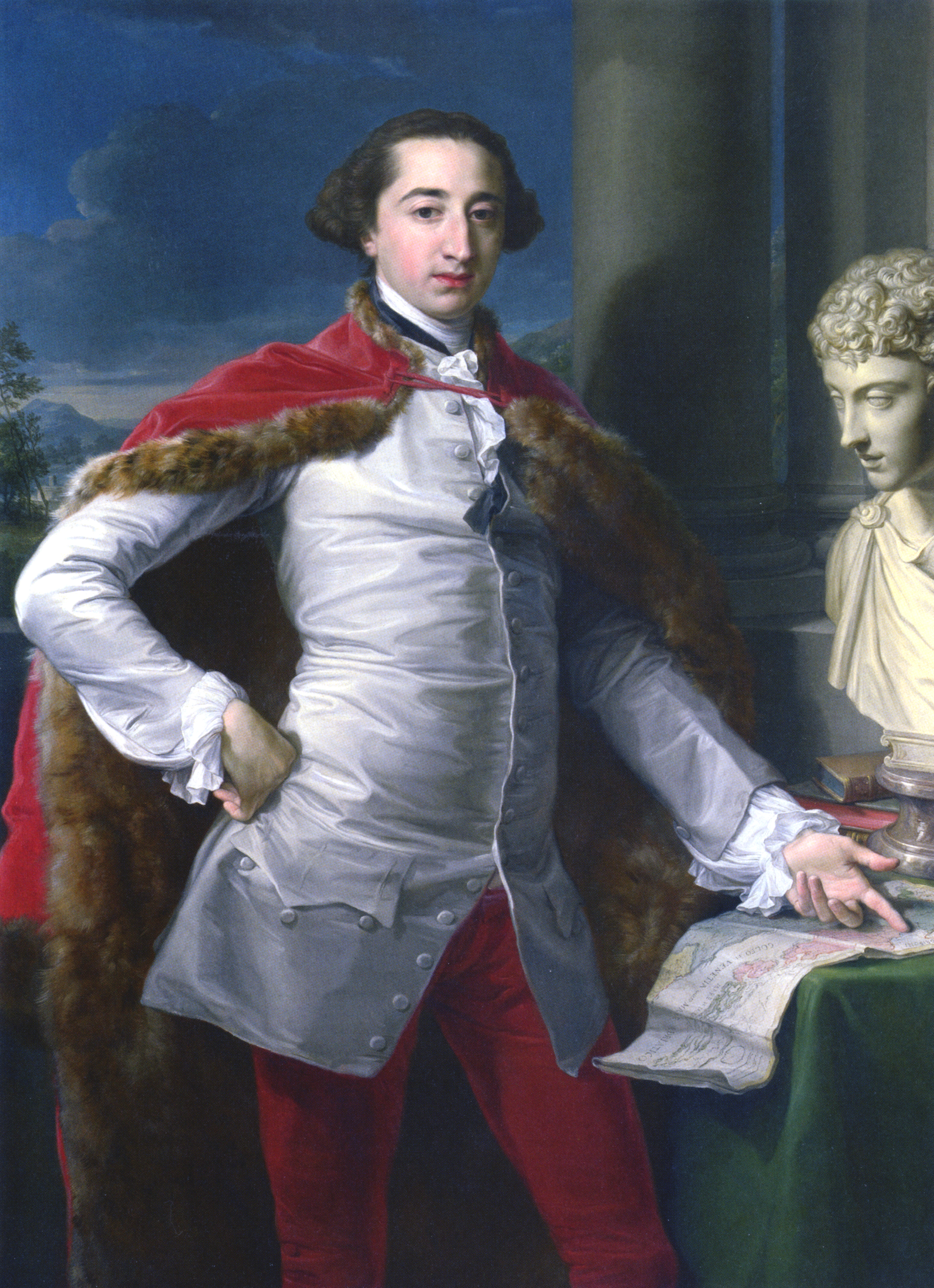
Portrait of Richard Milles, 1758, National Gallery, London

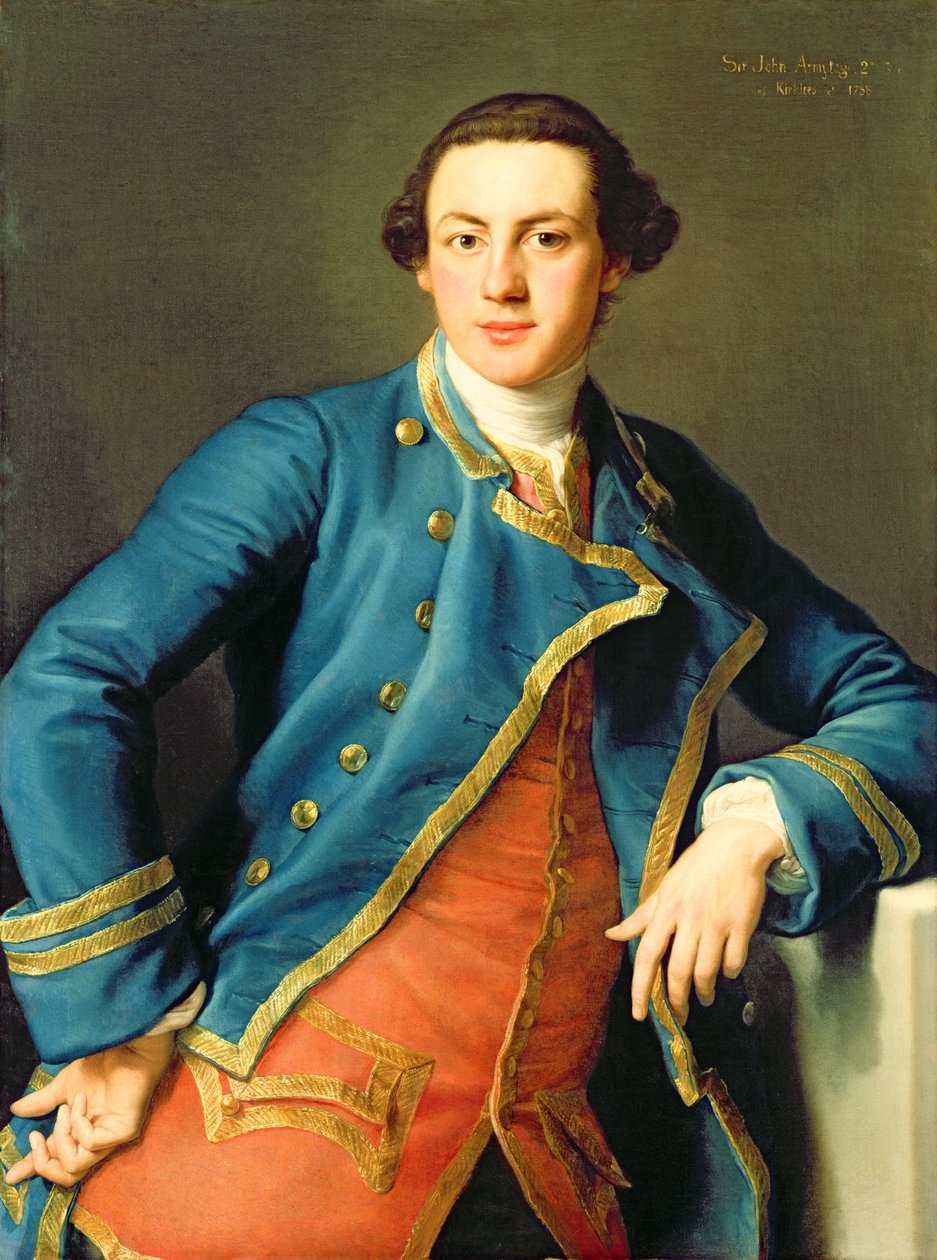
John Armytage, 2nd Baronet, 1758, private collection

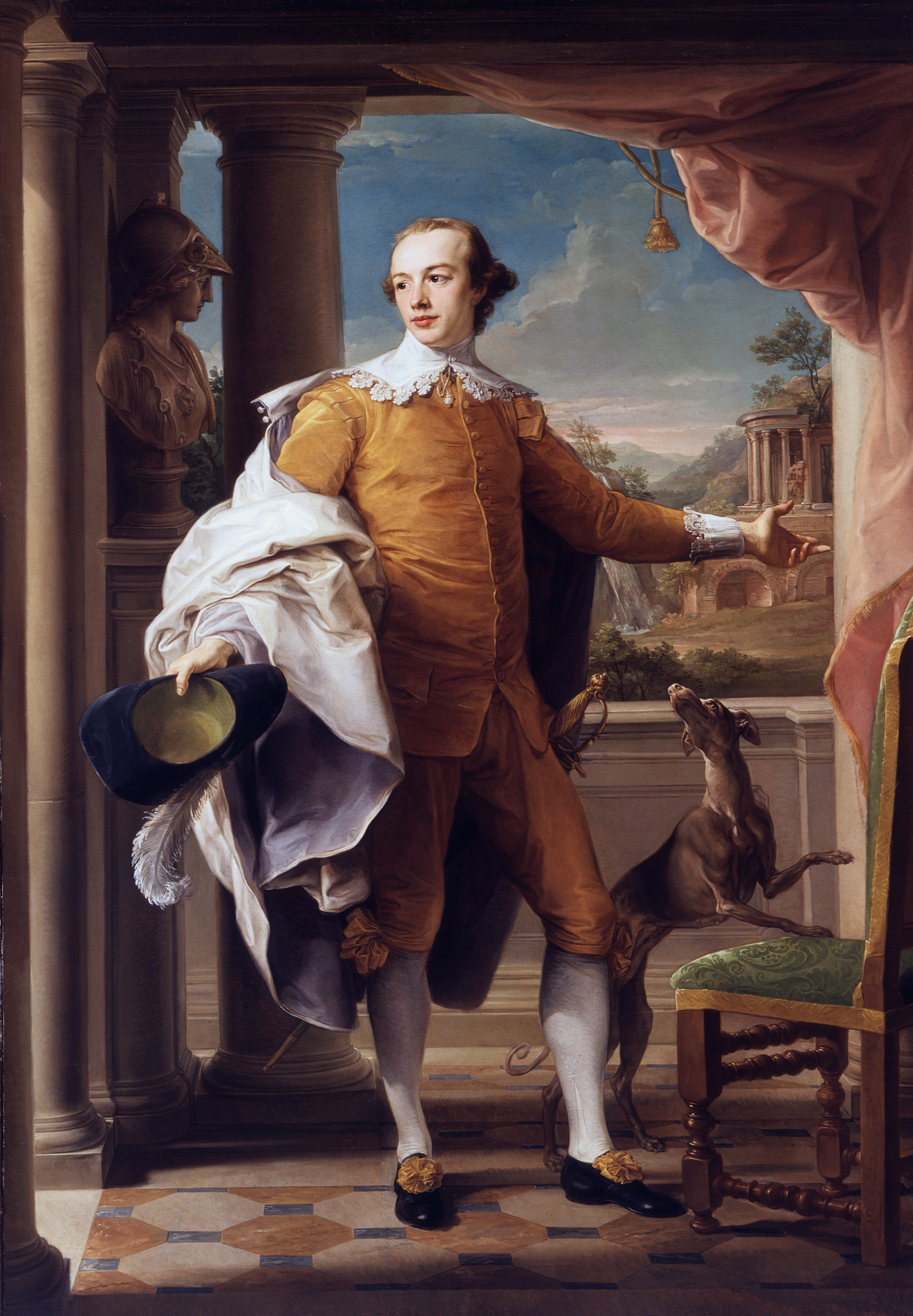
Sir Wyndham Knatchbull-Wyndham, 6th Bt, c. 1758, Los Angeles County Museum of Art

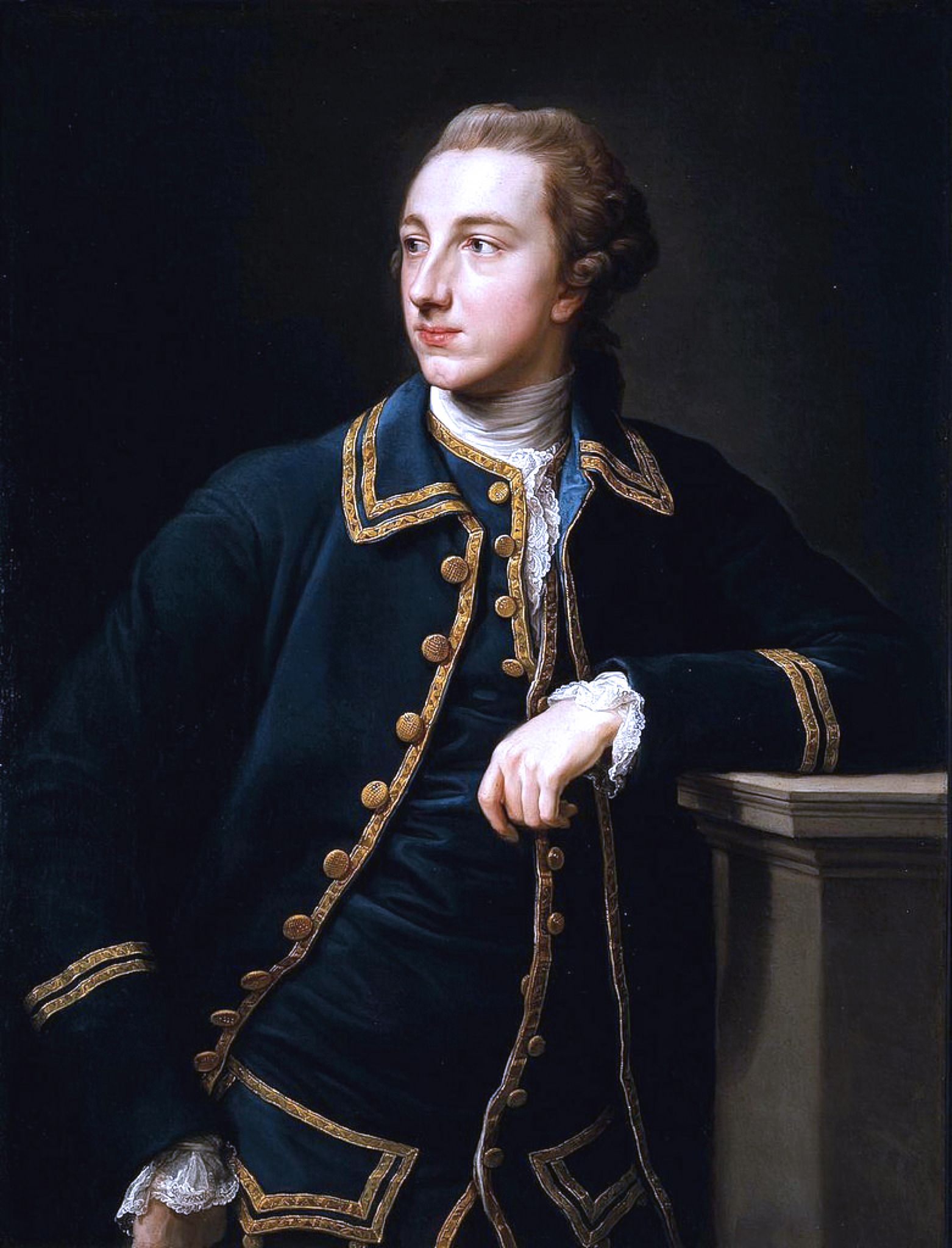
Portrait of a man in a blue suit, c. 1760, Dallas Museum of Art

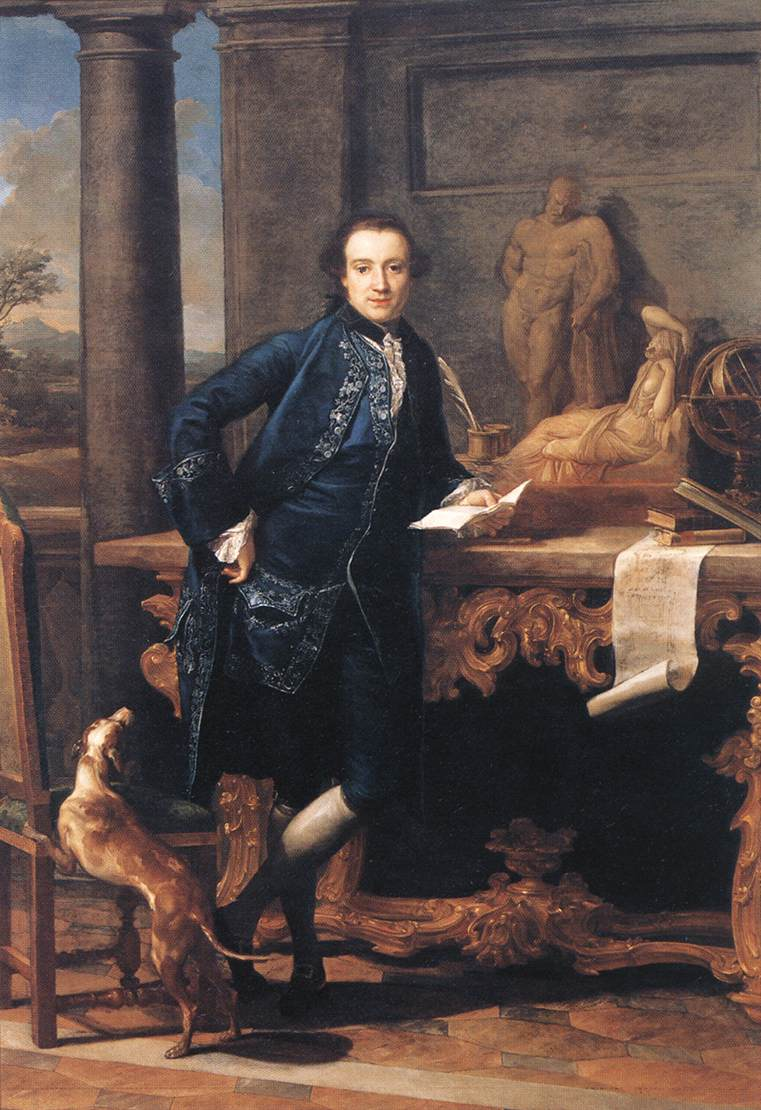
Charles Crowle, 1762, Louvre, Paris

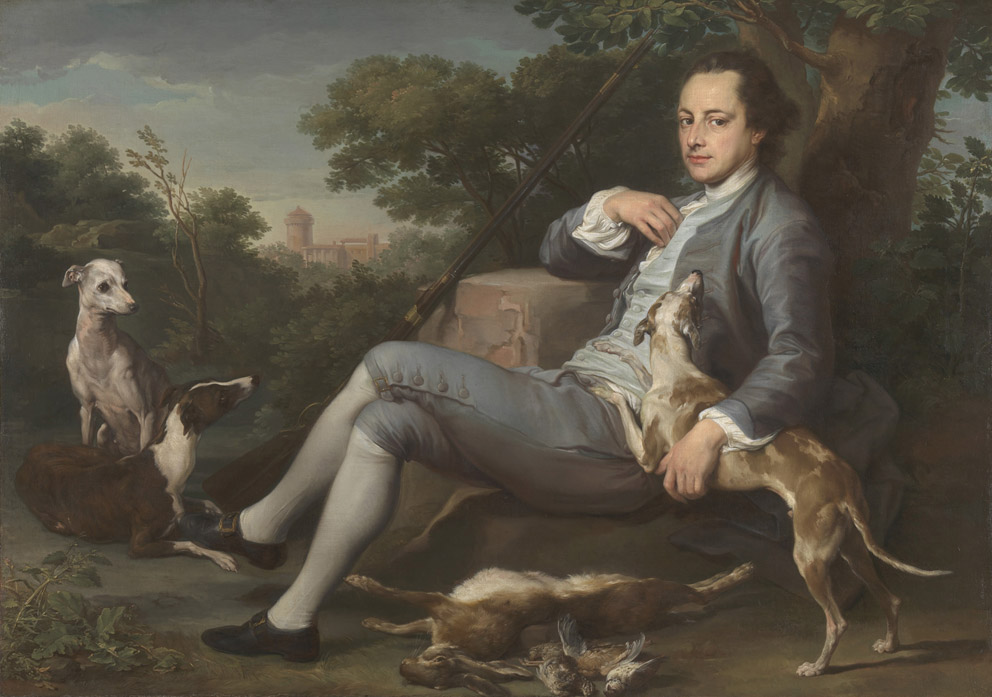
Portrait of Humphry Morice, c. 1762, National Portrait Gallery, London

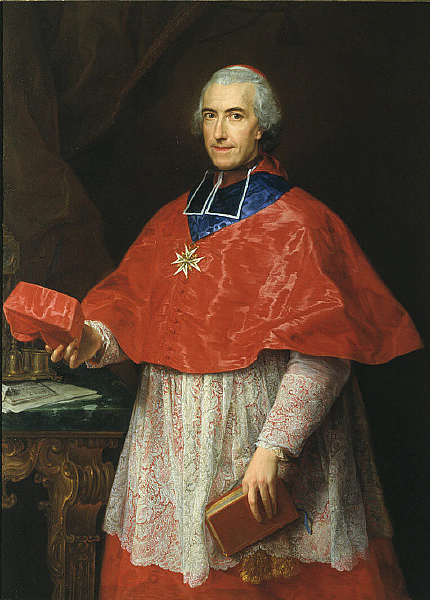
Cardinal Jean-François-Joseph de Rochechouart, 1762, Saint Louis Art Museum, Saint Louis,

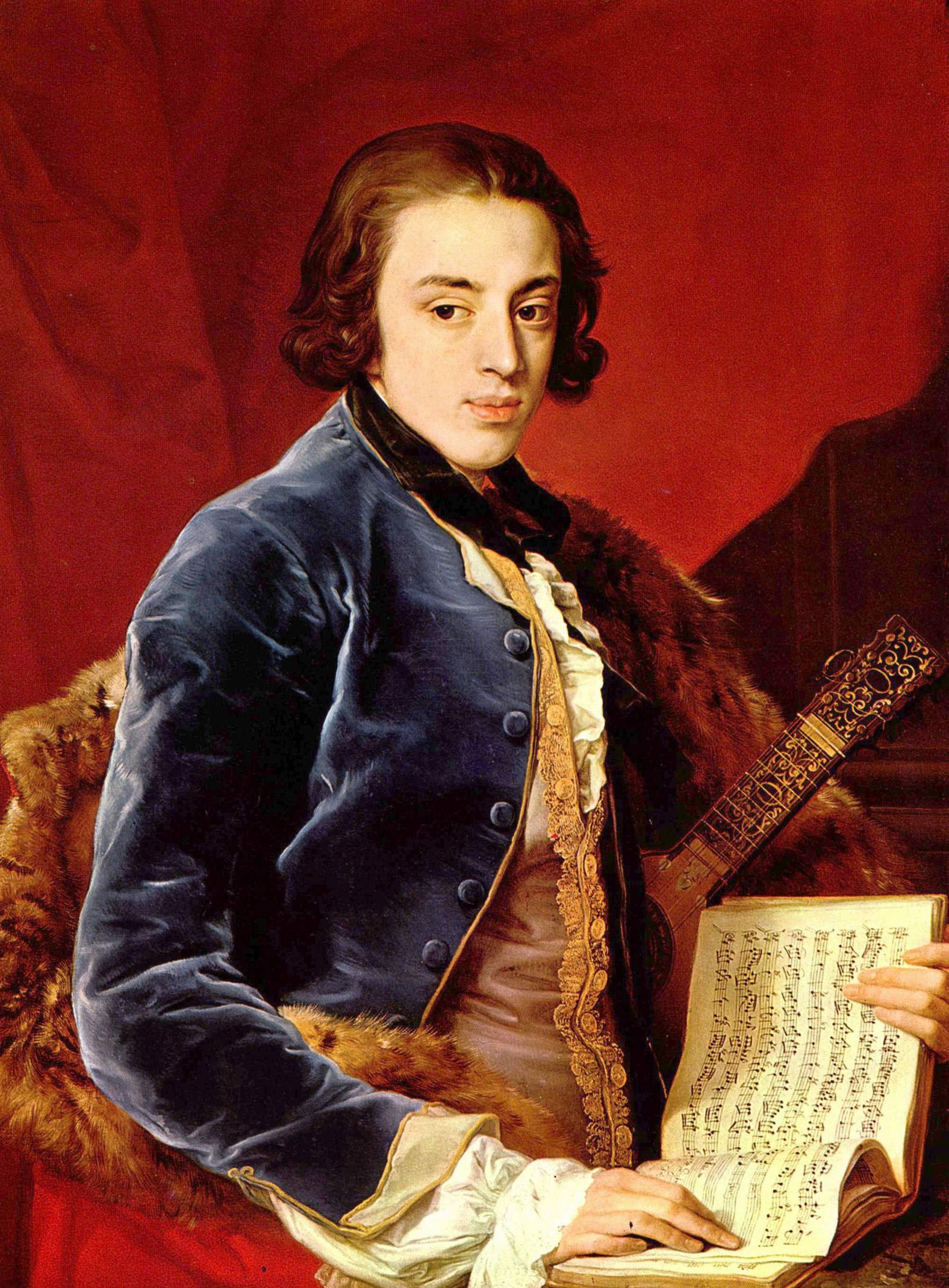
John Montagu, Marquess of Monthermer, 1764, Boughton House, Northamptonshire

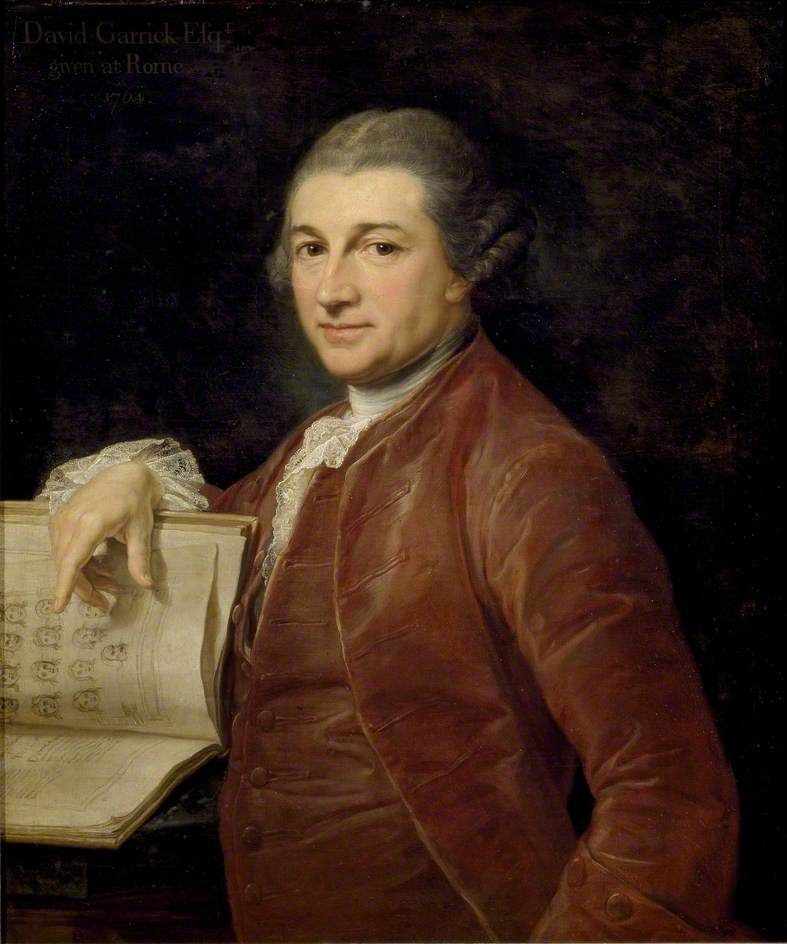
Portrait of David Garrick, 1764, Ashmolean Museum, Oxford

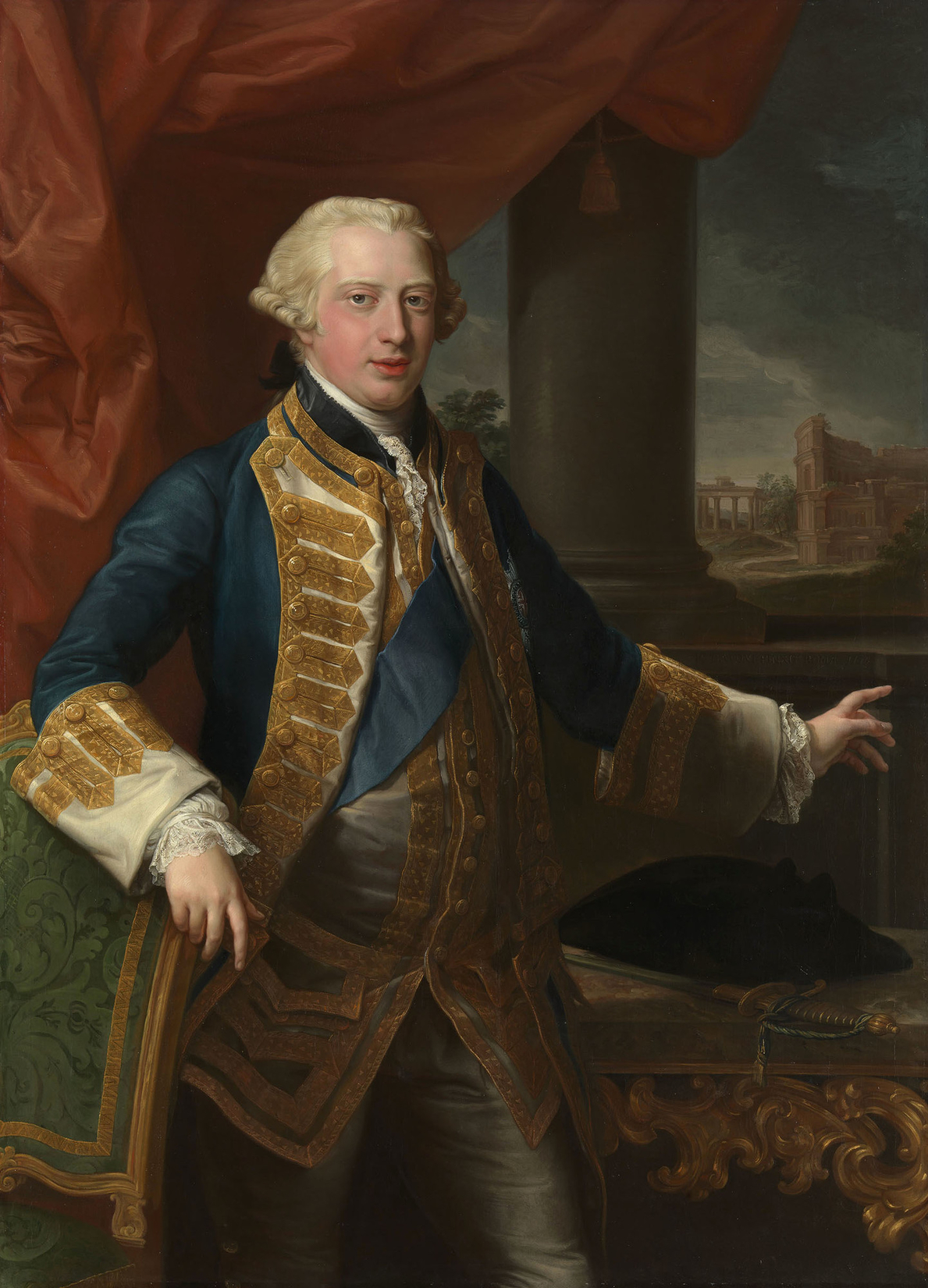
Portrait of the Duke of York, 1764

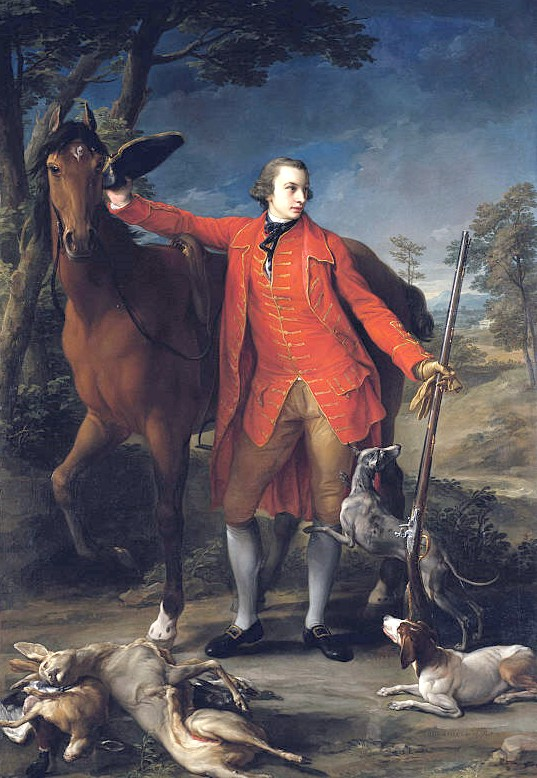
Alexander, 4th Duke of Gordon, 1764, Scottish National Portrait Gallery, Edinburgh

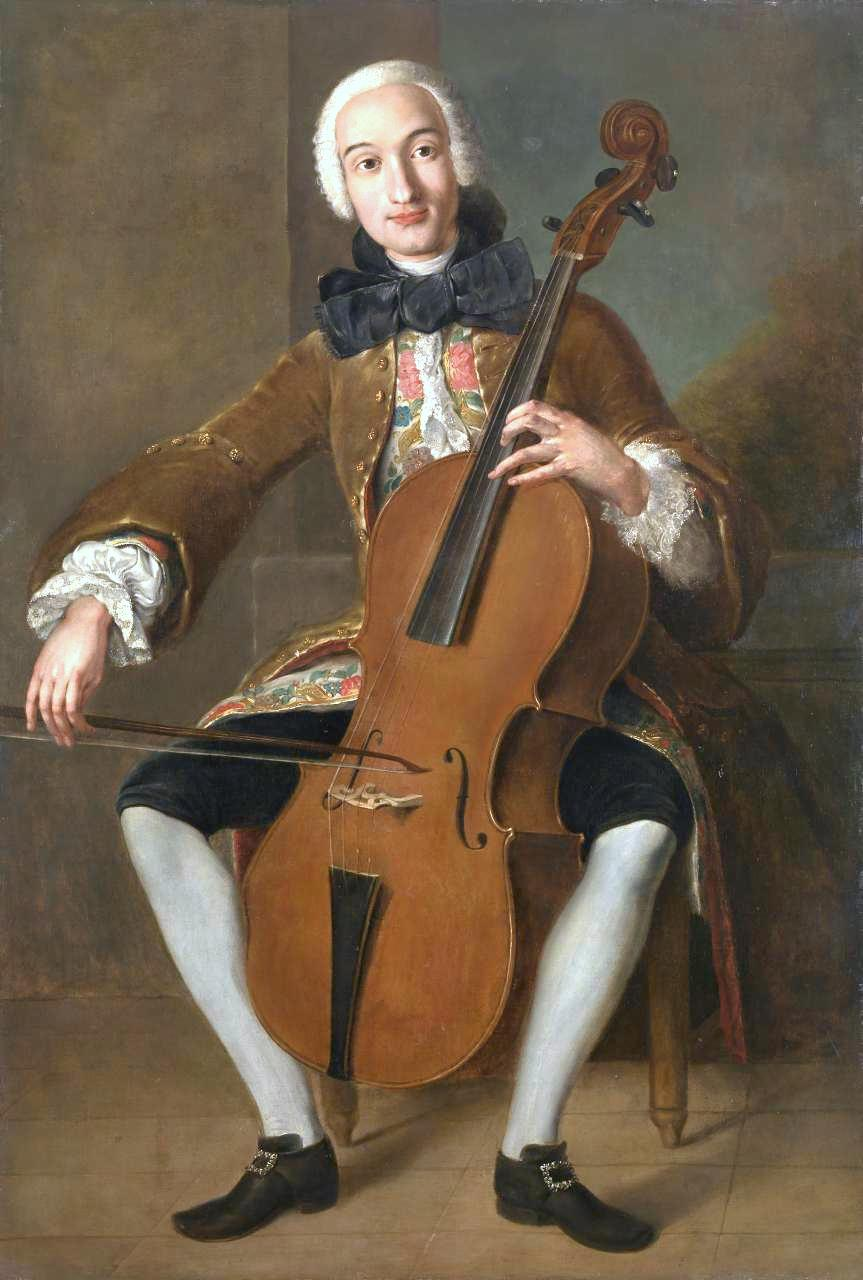
Luigi Boccherini, c. 1764–67, National Gallery of Victoria, Melbourne

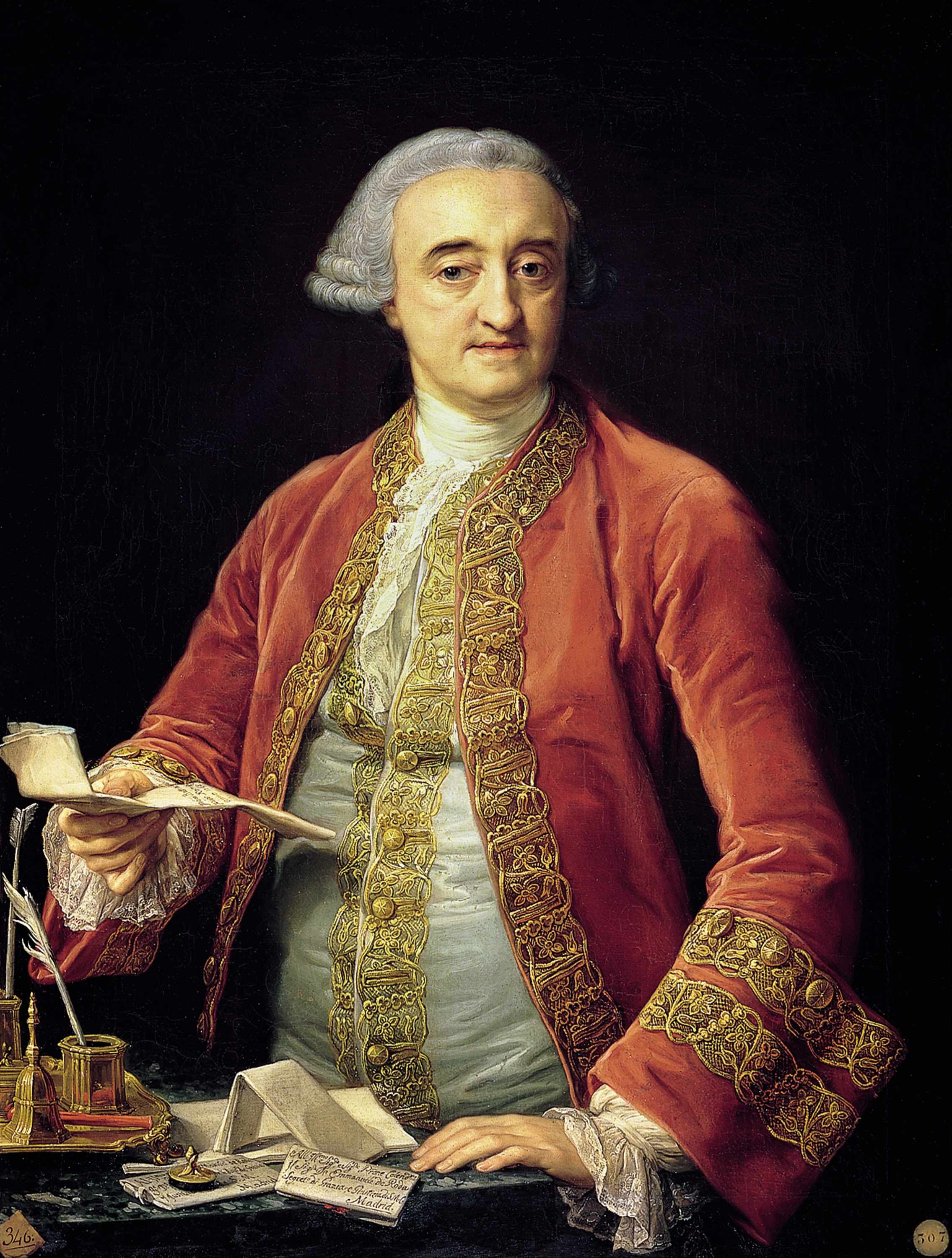
Manuel de Roda, c. 1765, Real Academia de Bellas Artes de San Fernando, Madrid

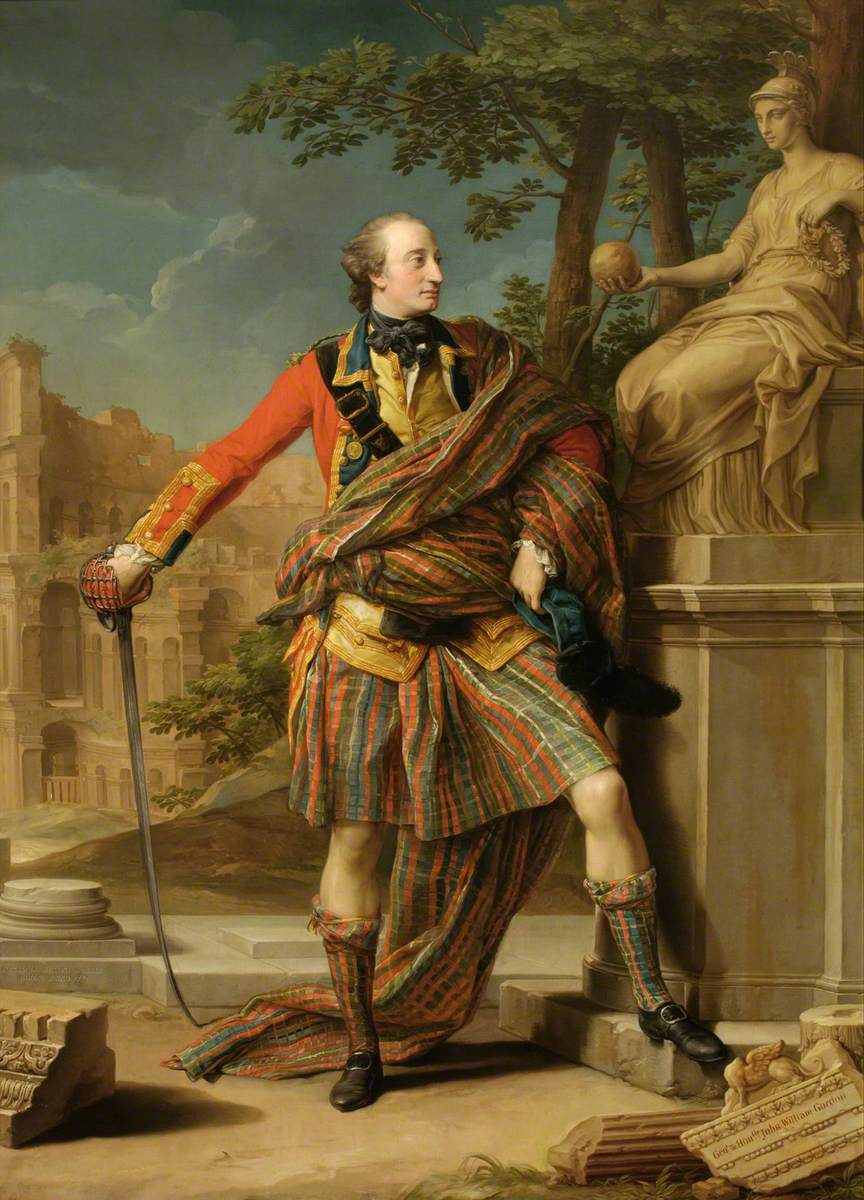
Portrait of William Gordon, 1766, Fyvie Castle, Fyvie

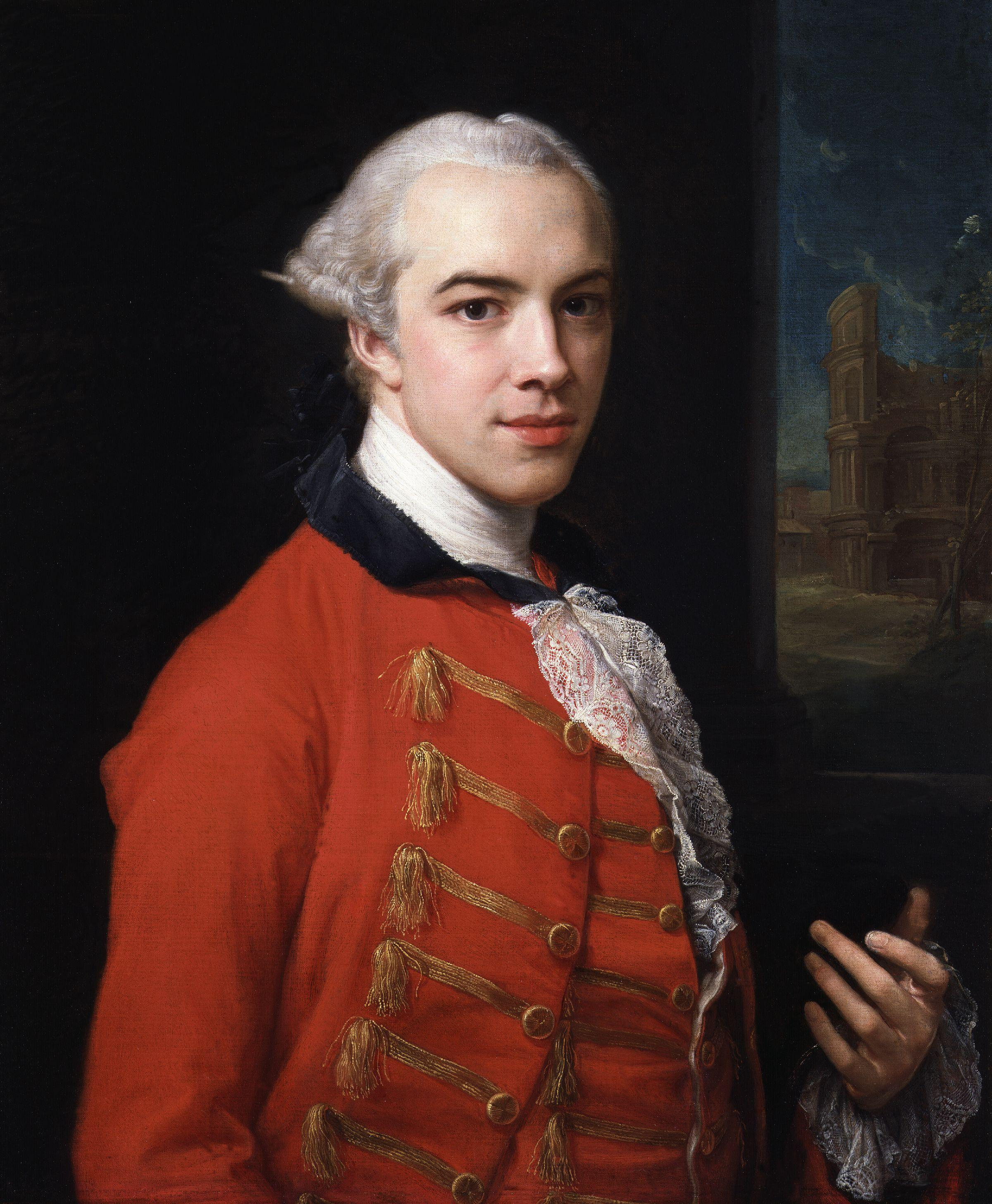
Philip Metcalfe, 1766–67, National Portrait Gallery, London

Portrait of the Duke of Brunswick, 1767, Herzog Anton Ulrich Museum, Brunswick

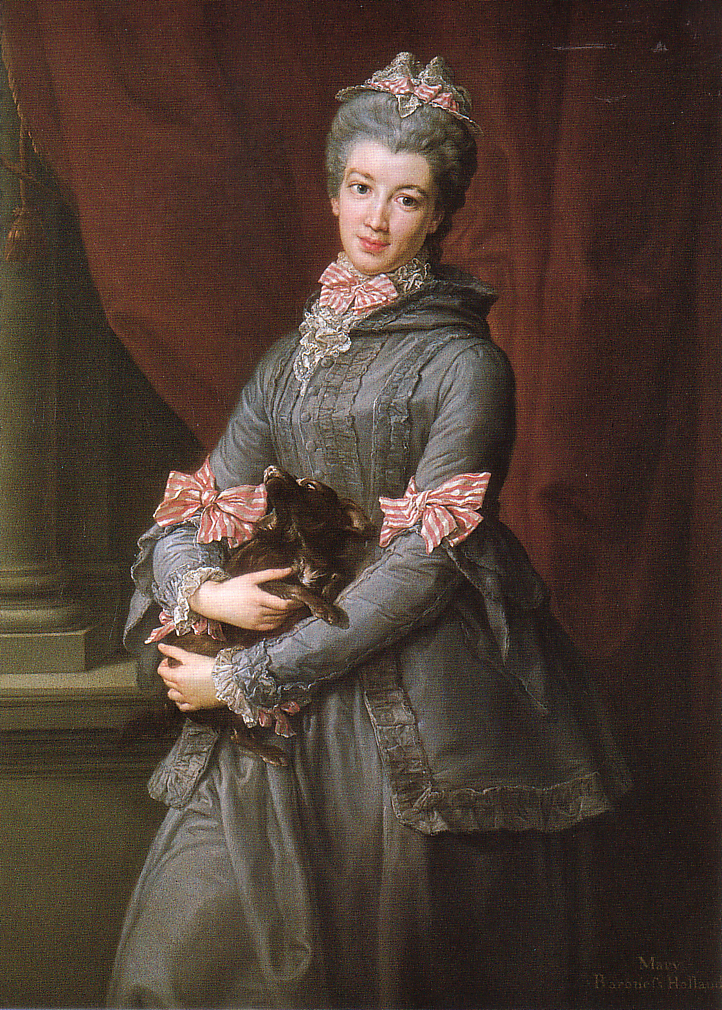
Lady Mary Fox, later Baroness Holland, 1767

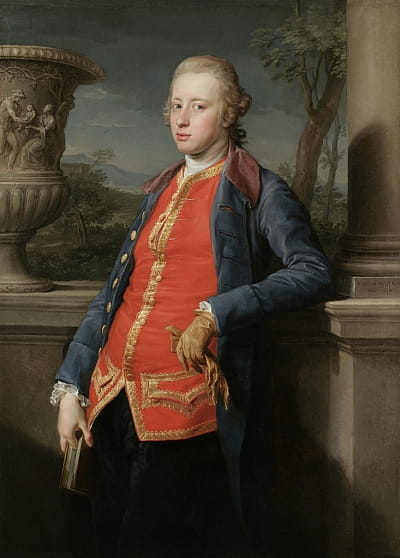
Portrait of the Duke of Devonshire, 1768, Chatsworth House, Derbyshire

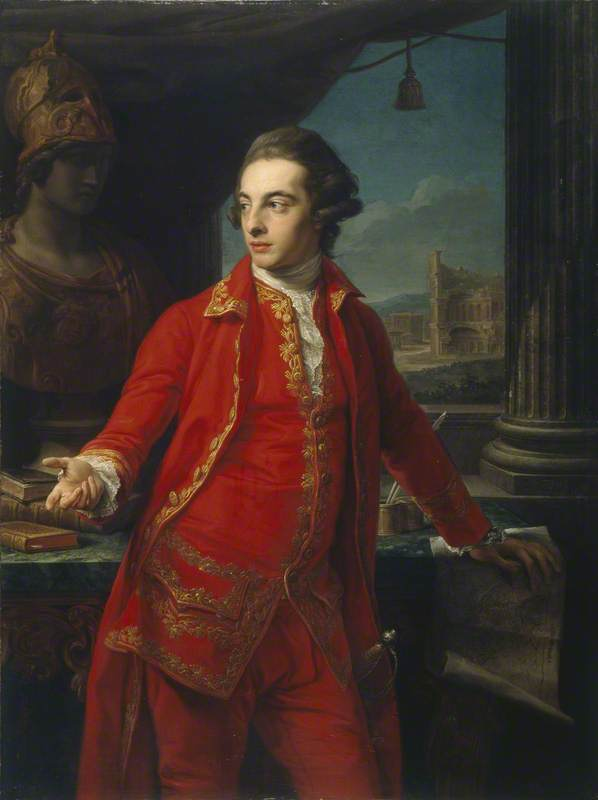
Portrait of Sir Gregory Page-Turner, c. 1768, Manchester Art Gallery

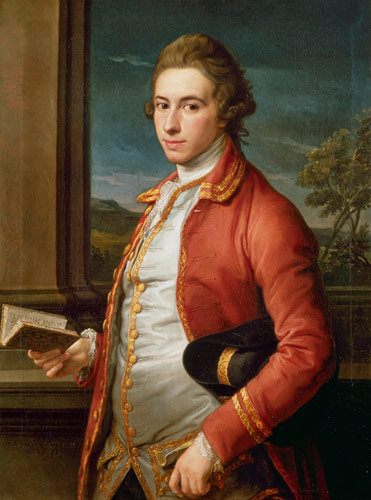
Sir William FitzHerbert, 1st Baronet, c. 1768, Tissington Hall, Derbyshire

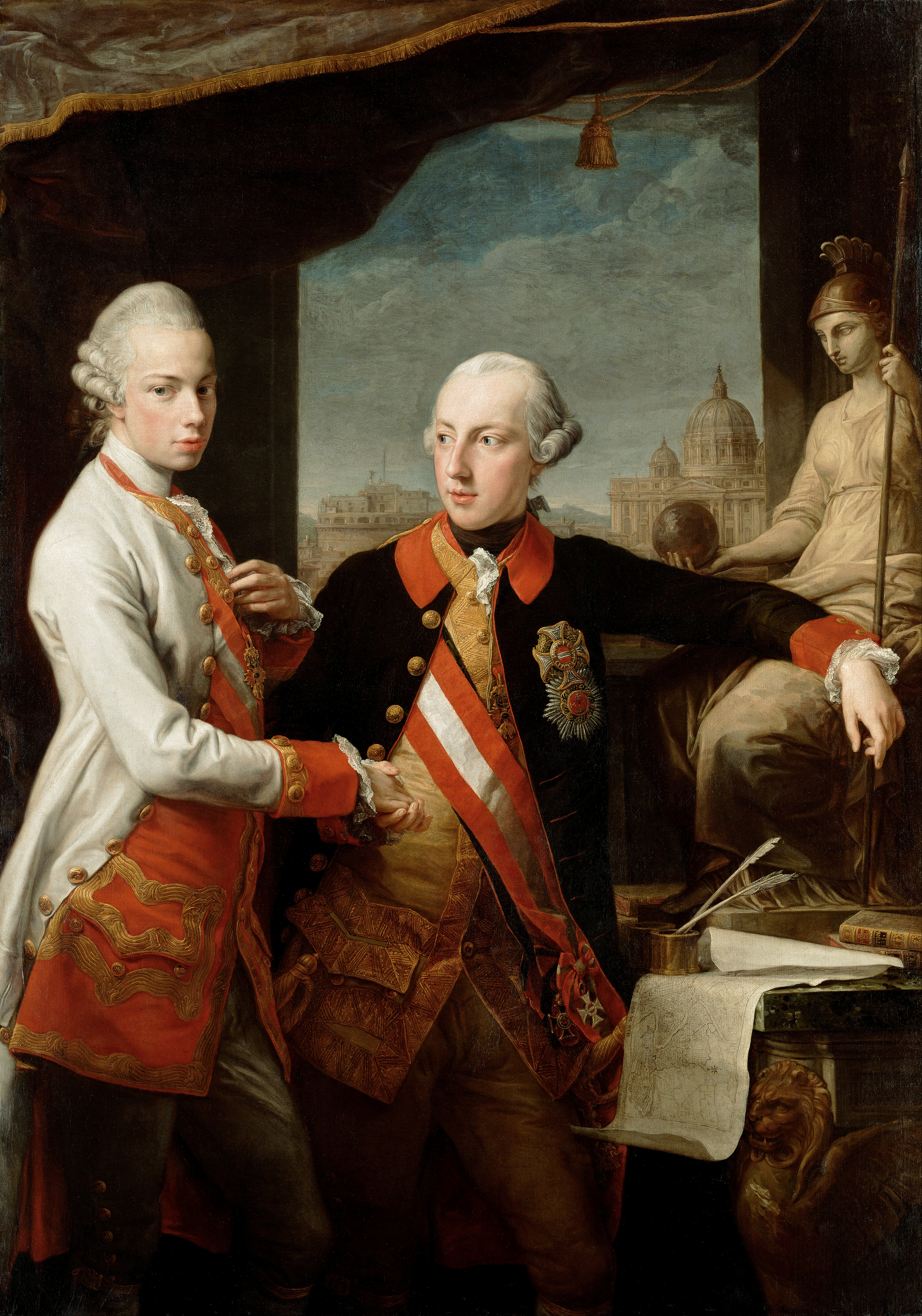
Emperor Joseph II and Grand Duke Pietro Leopoldo of Tuscany, 1769, Kunsthistorisches Museum, Vienna

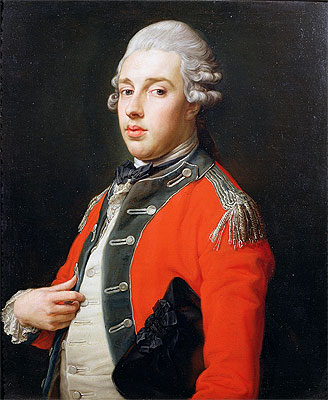
George, 1st Marquess of Cholmondeley, 1772, Houghton Hall, Norfolk

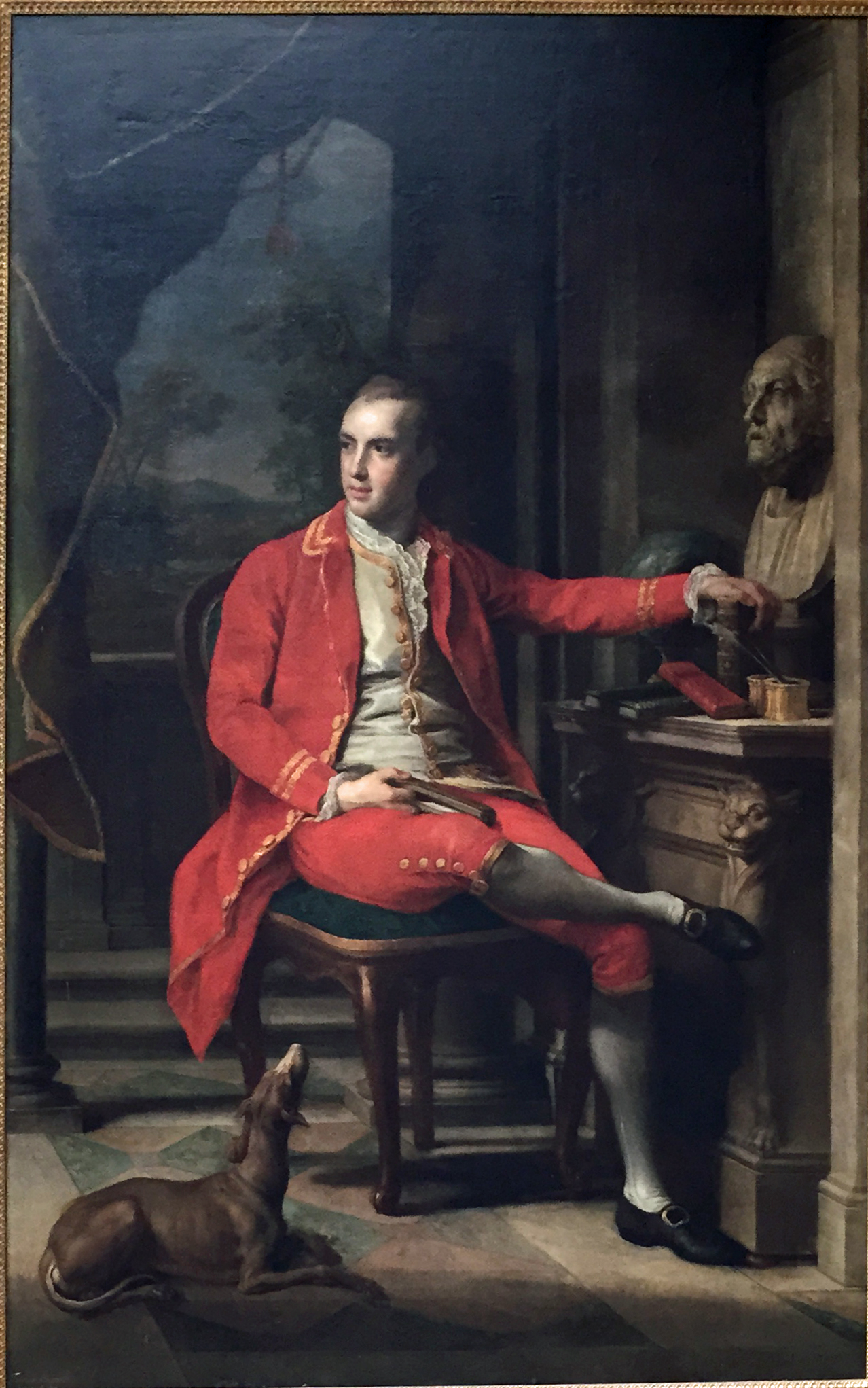
Thomas Estcourt, Esquire, 1772, Brown University, Providence, Rhode Island

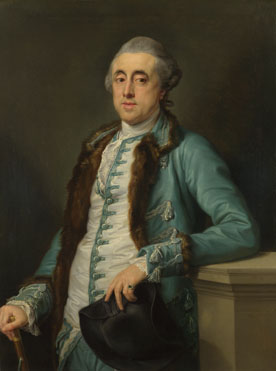
Portrait of a Man, 1774, National Portrait Gallery, London

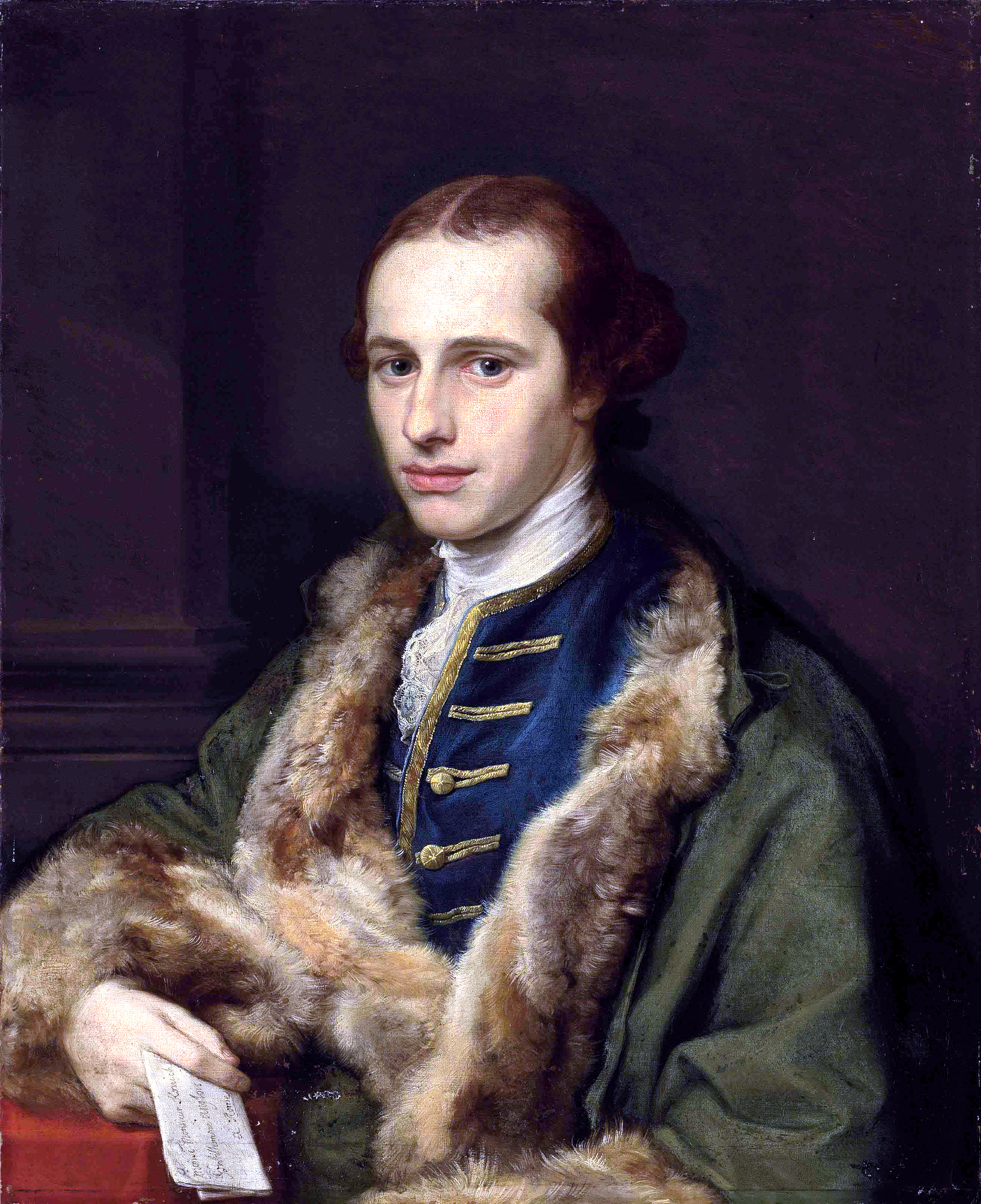
Reverend Thomas Kerrich, c. 1774

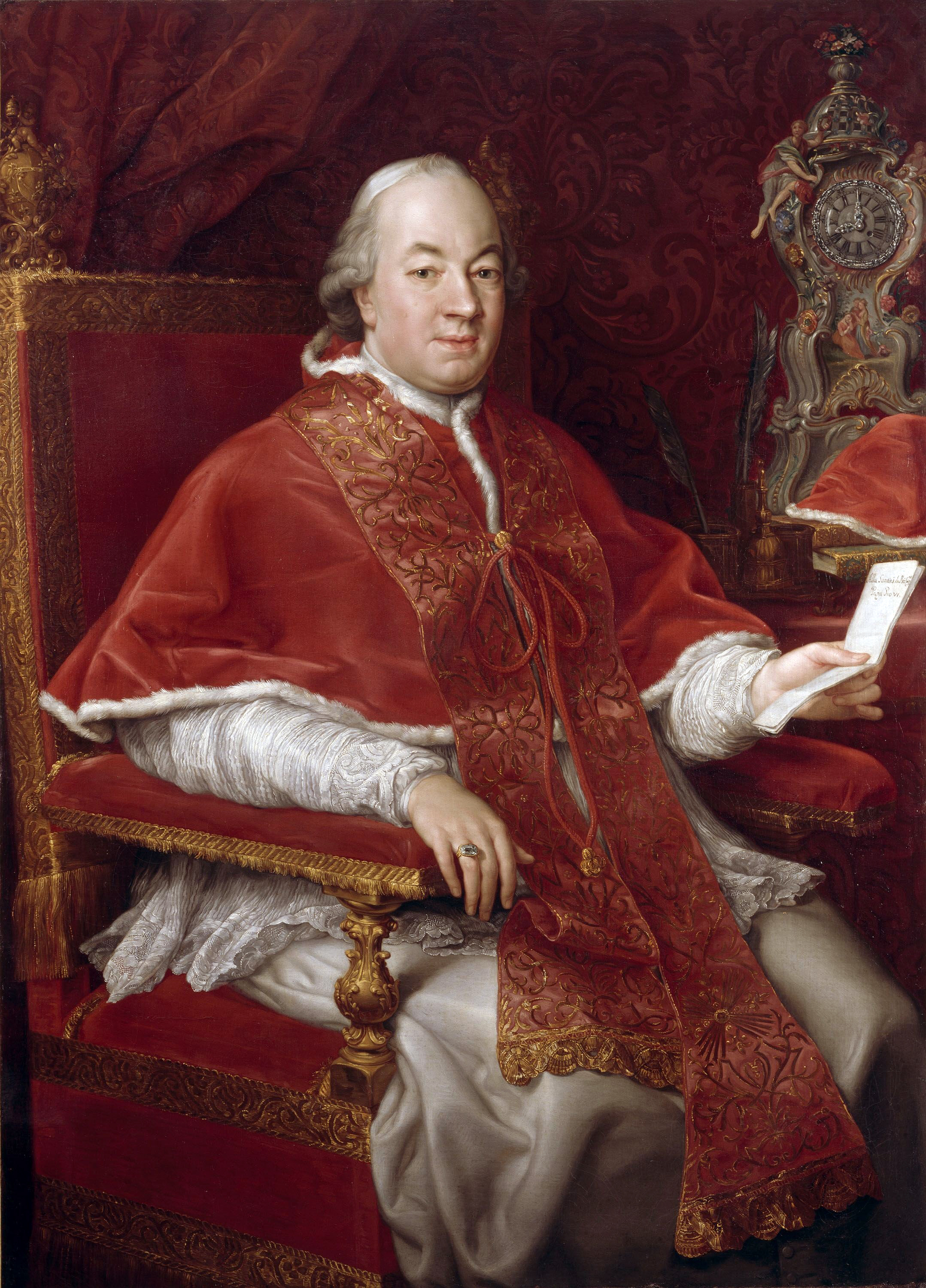
Pope Pius VI, 1775, National Gallery of Ireland, Dublin

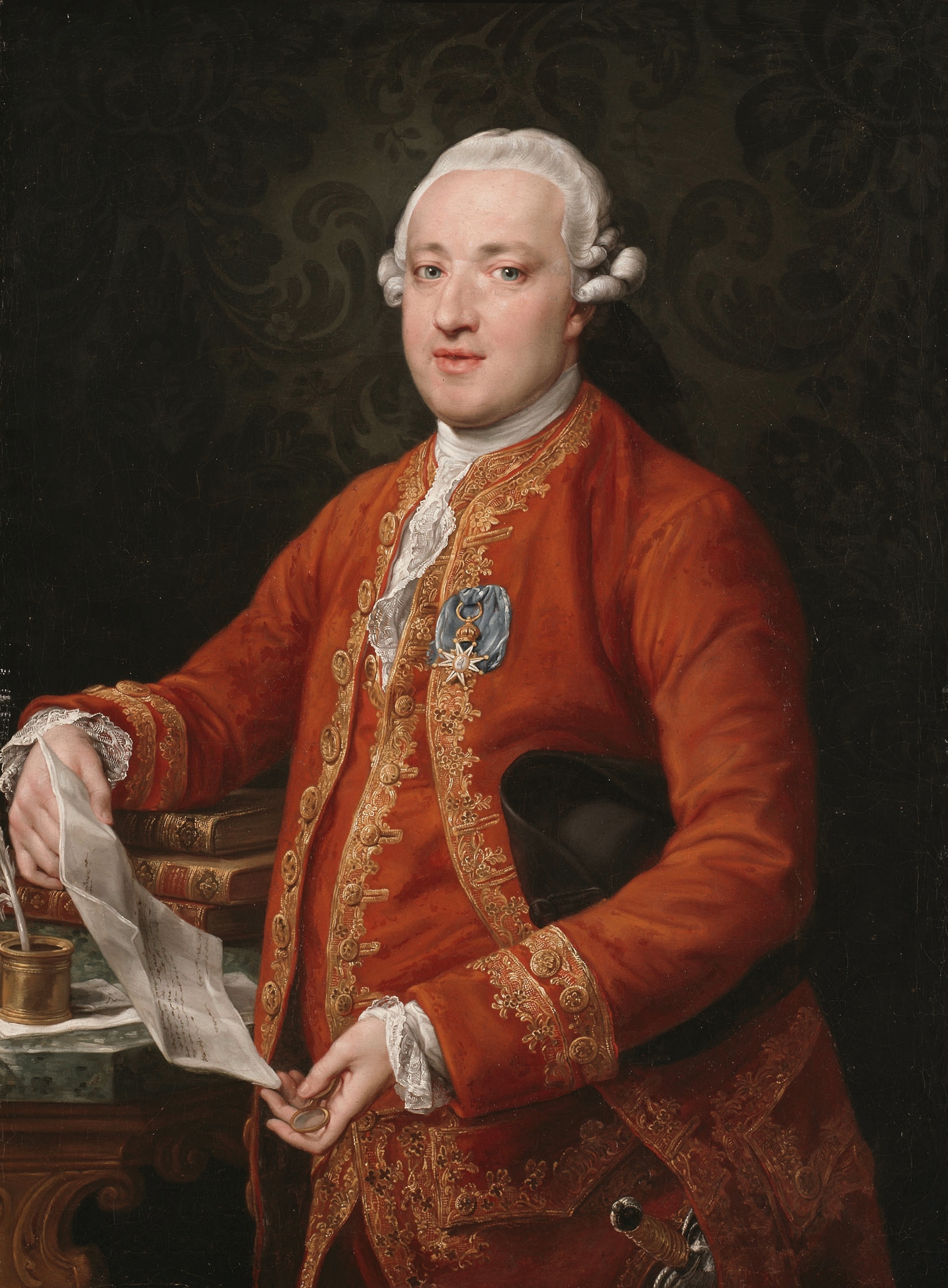
José Moñino, 1st Count of Floridablanca, 1776, Art Institute of Chicago

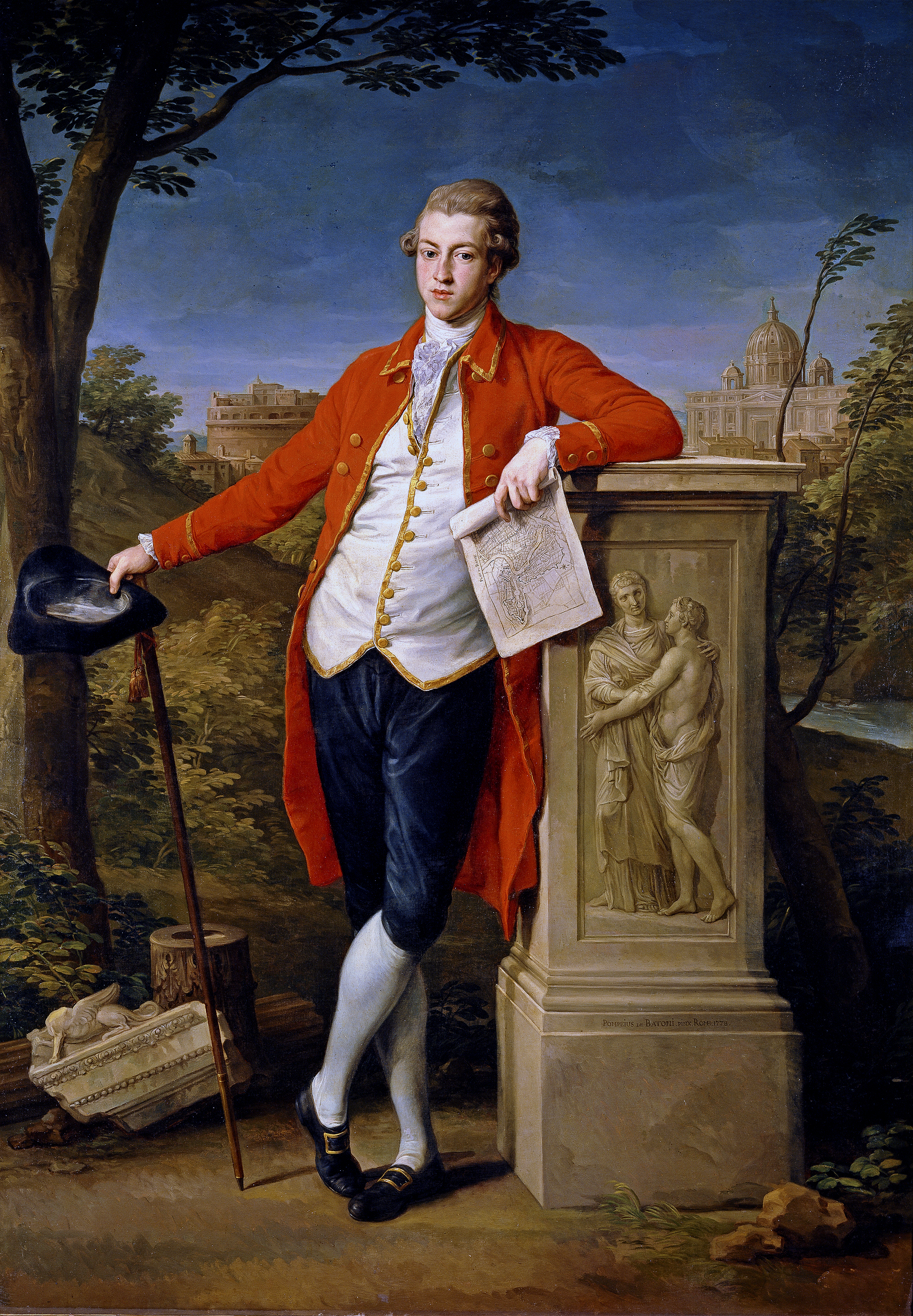
Portrait of Francis Basset on the Grand Tour in Rome, 1778, Prado Museum

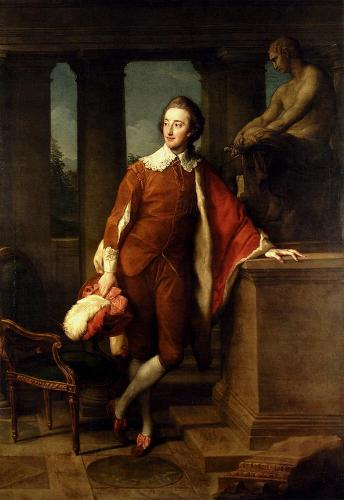
Anthony Ashley-Cooper, 5th Earl of Shaftesbury, 1782, St Giles House, Wimborne St Giles, Dorset

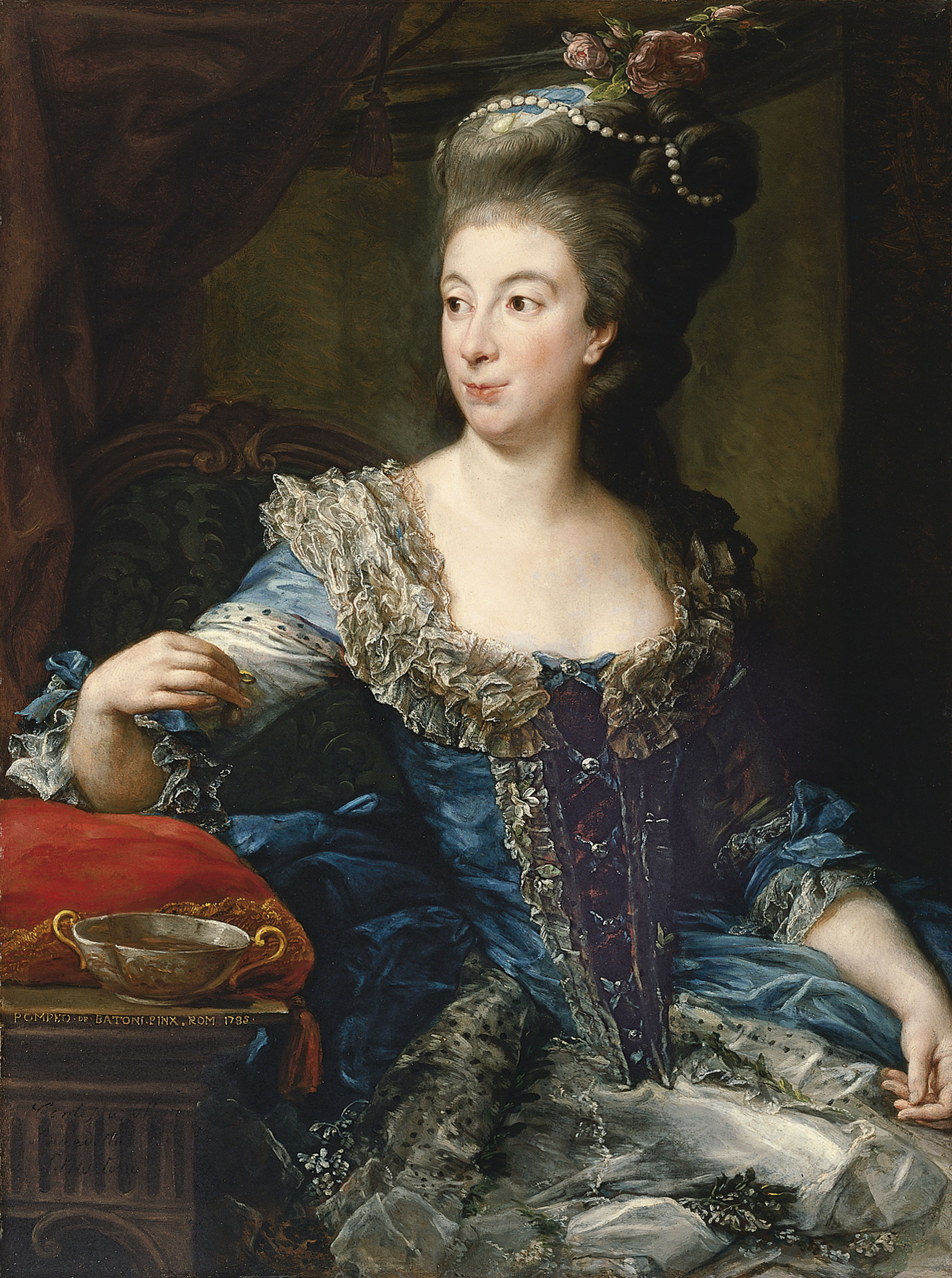
Countess Maria Benedetta di San Martino, 1785, Thyssen-Bornemisza Museum

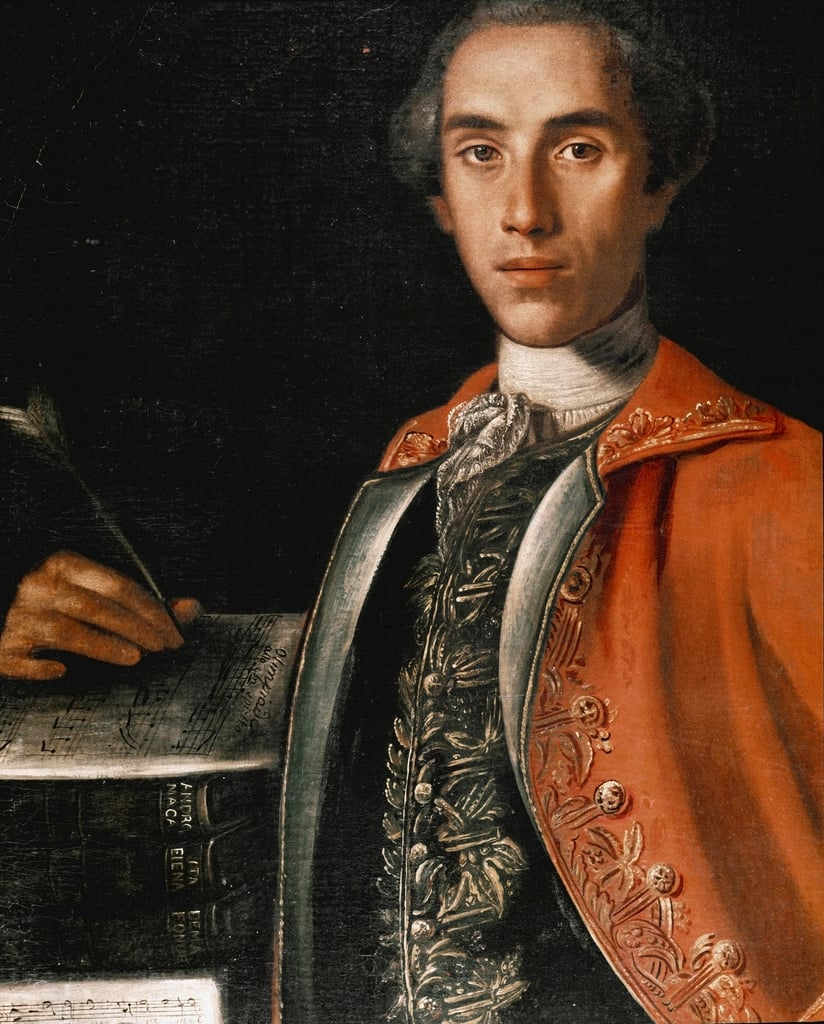
Leonardo Leo, 18th century, Naples Conservatory of Music

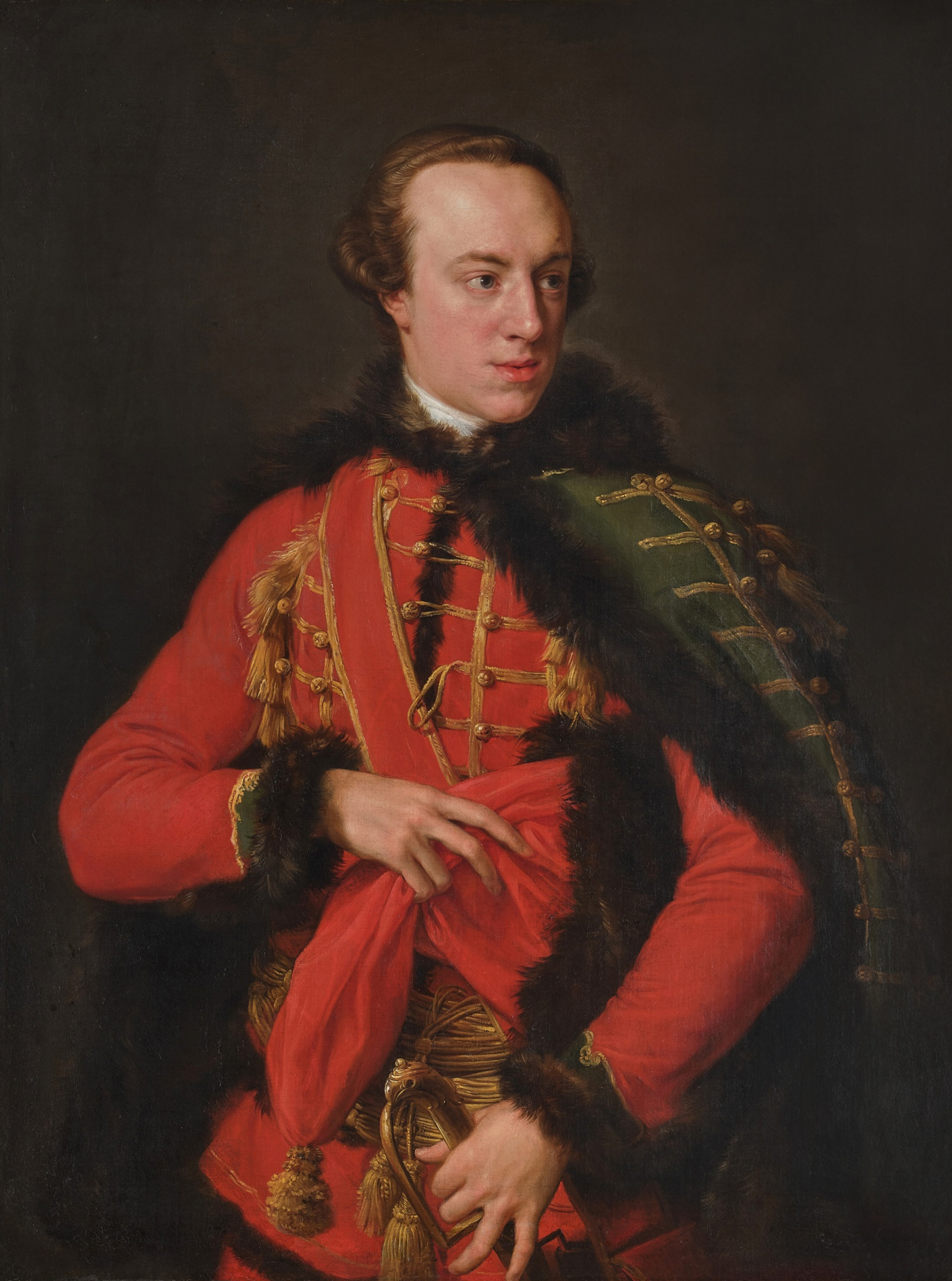
Portrait of Stephen Beckingham, 1752

=== Other subjects ===
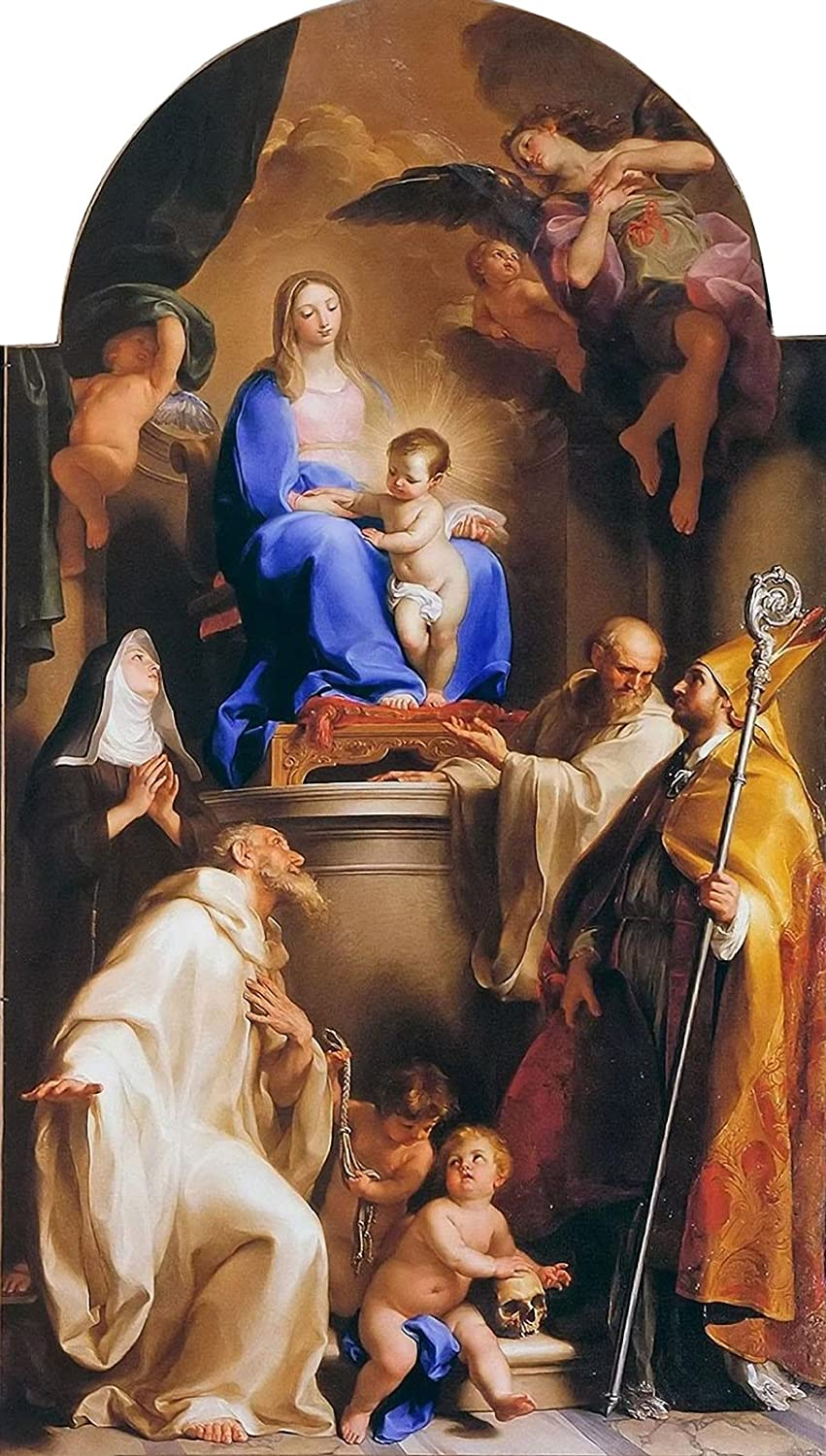
Madonna enthroned with Child and Saints of the Gabrielli di Gubbio family, 1732, San Gregorio Magno al Celio, Rome

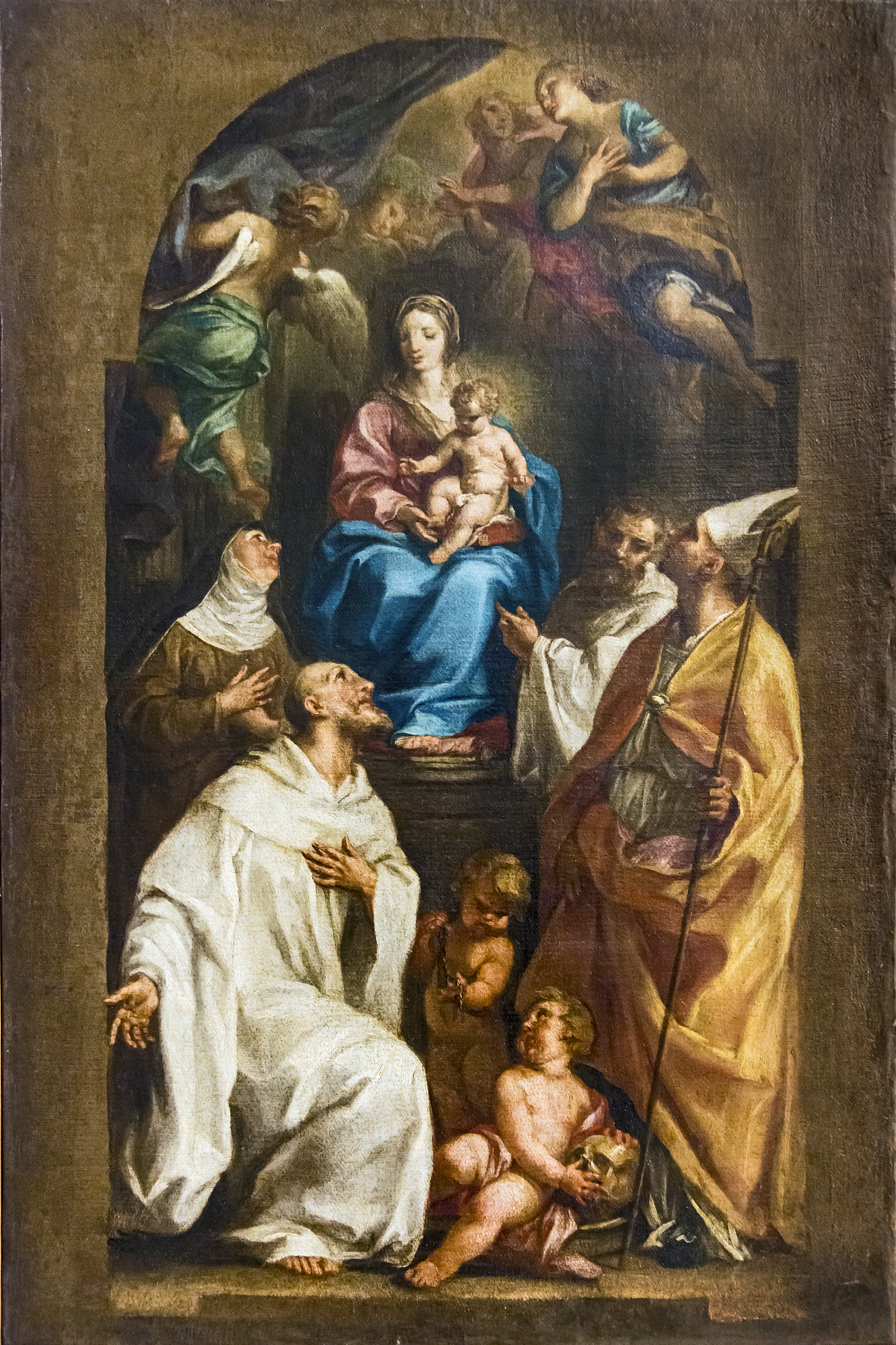
Madonna enthroned with Child and Saints of the Gabrielli di Gubbio family, 1736, Gallerie dell'Accademia, Venice

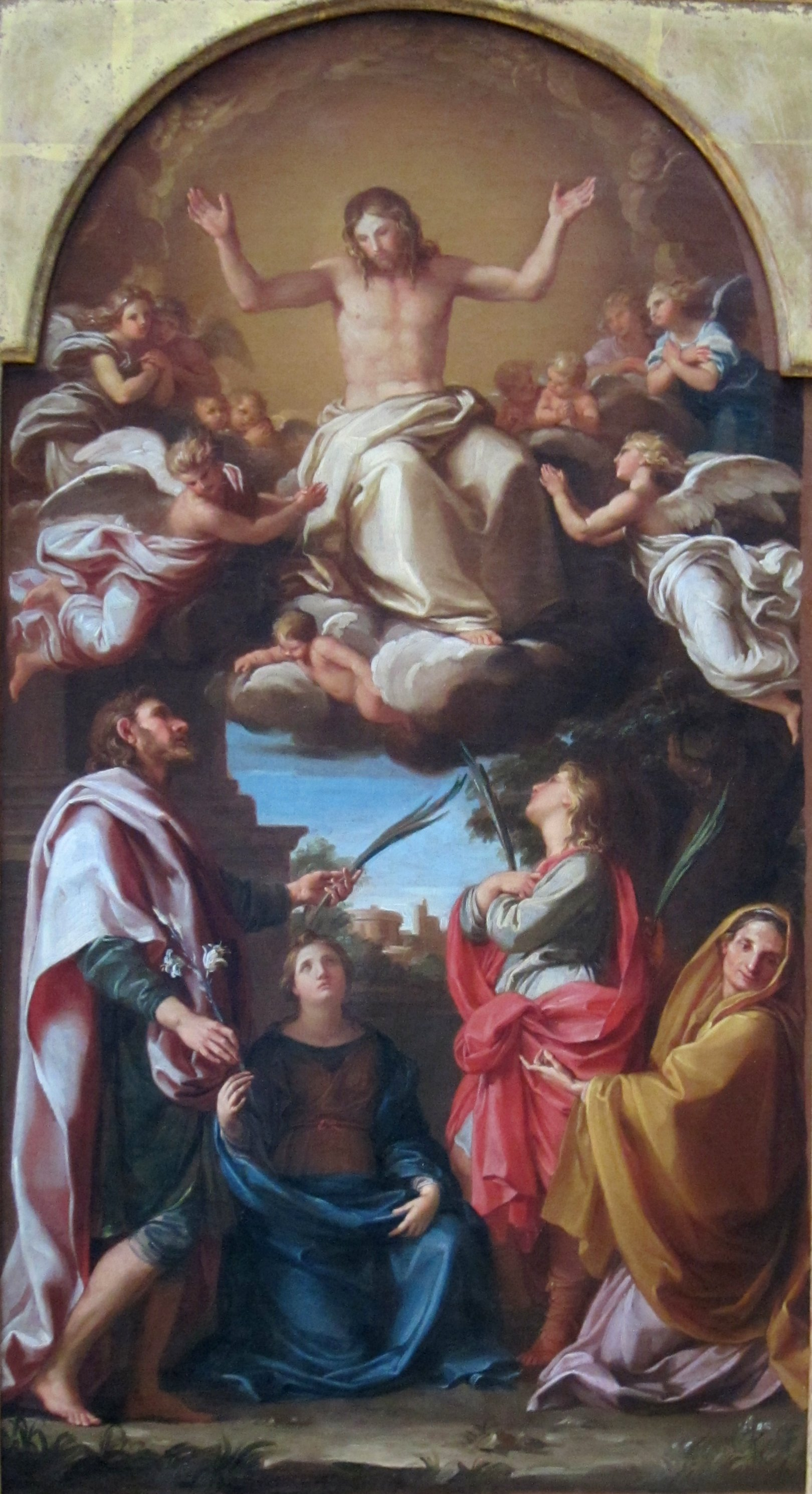
Christ with Saints Julian and Basilissa, Celsus and Marcionilla, 1736–8, J. Paul Getty Museum, Los Angeles

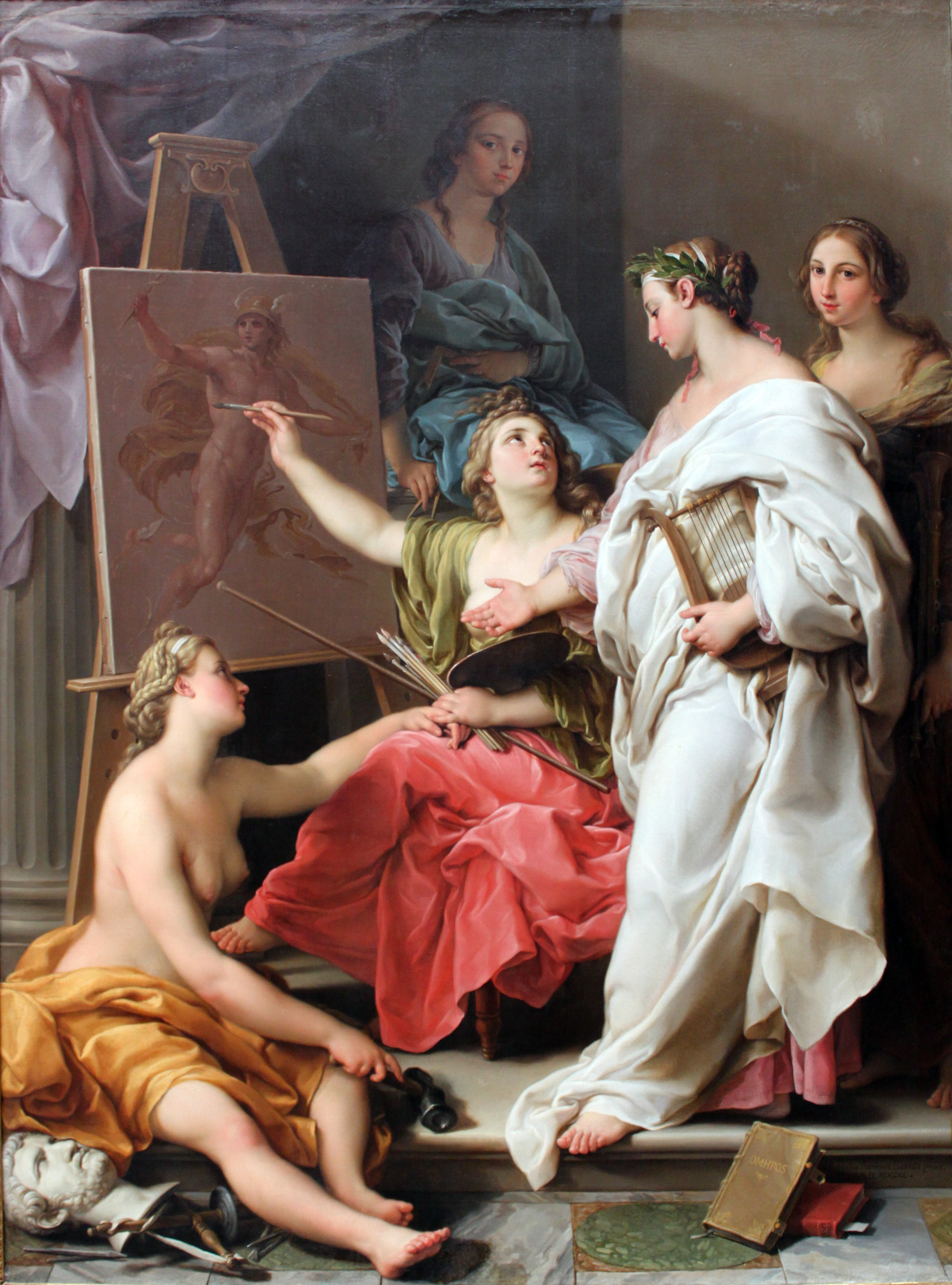
Allegory of the Arts, 1740, Städelsches Kunstinstitut, Frankfurt

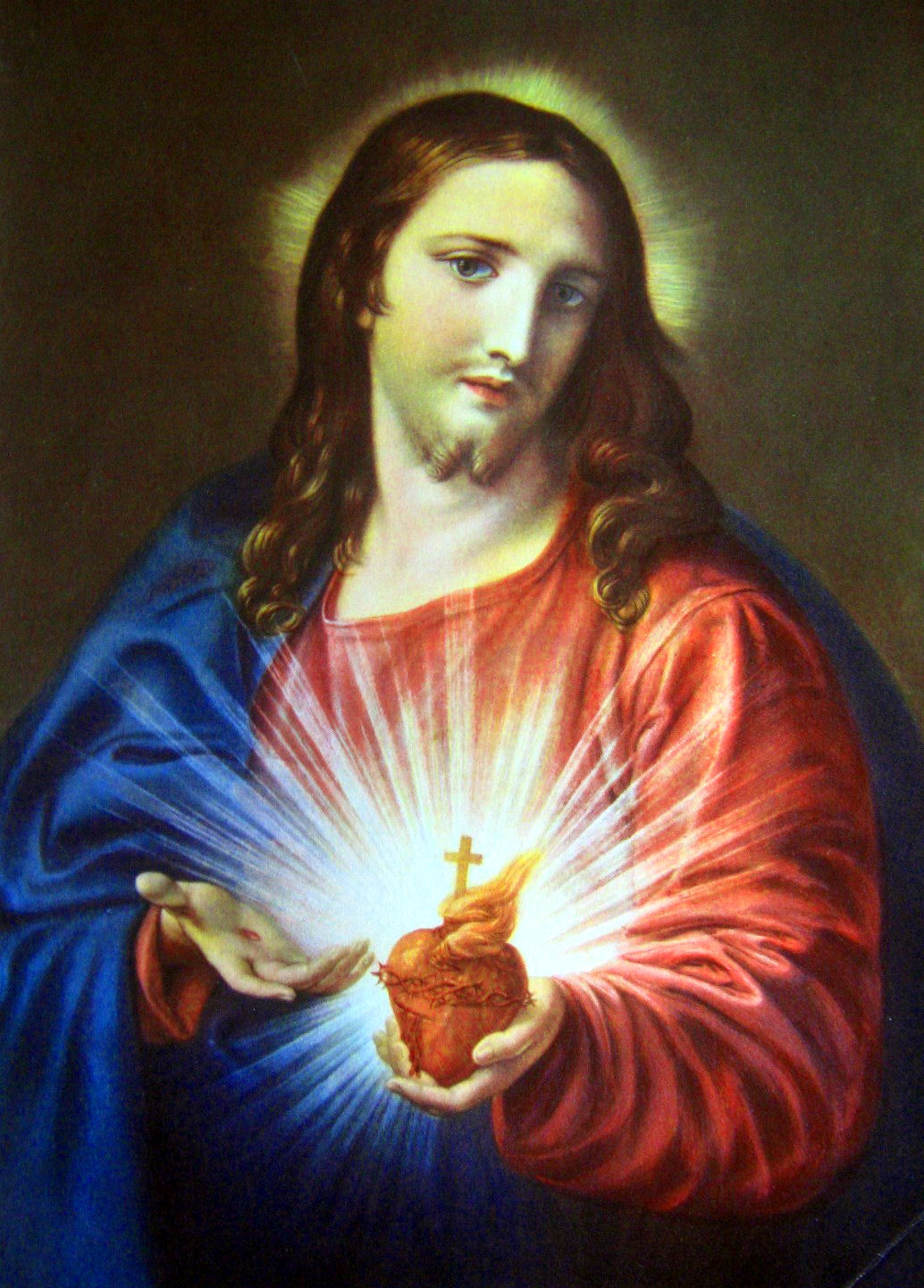
Sacred Heart of Jesus, 1767, Church of the Gesù, Rome

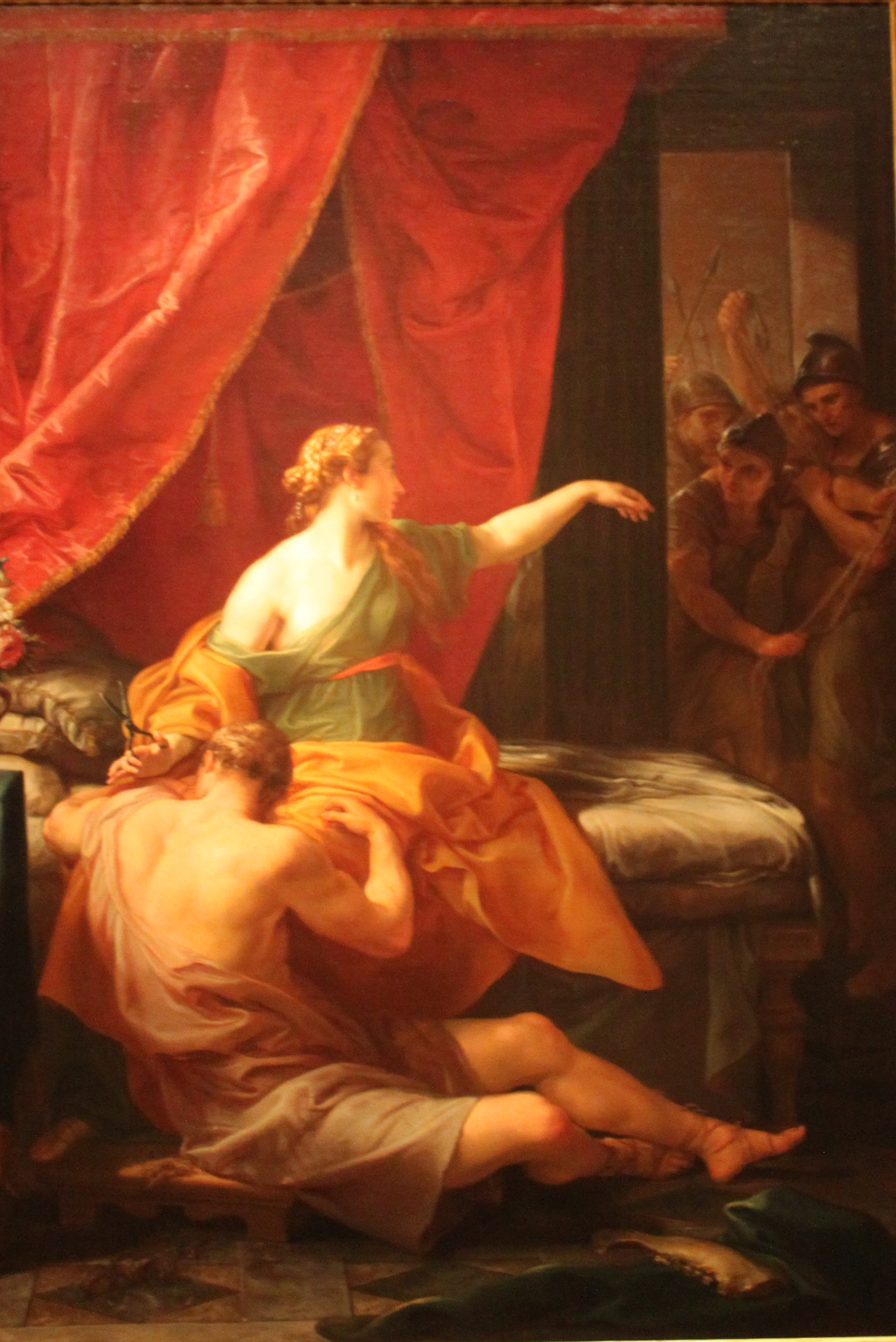
Samson and Delilah, 1766, Detroit Institute of Arts, Detroit

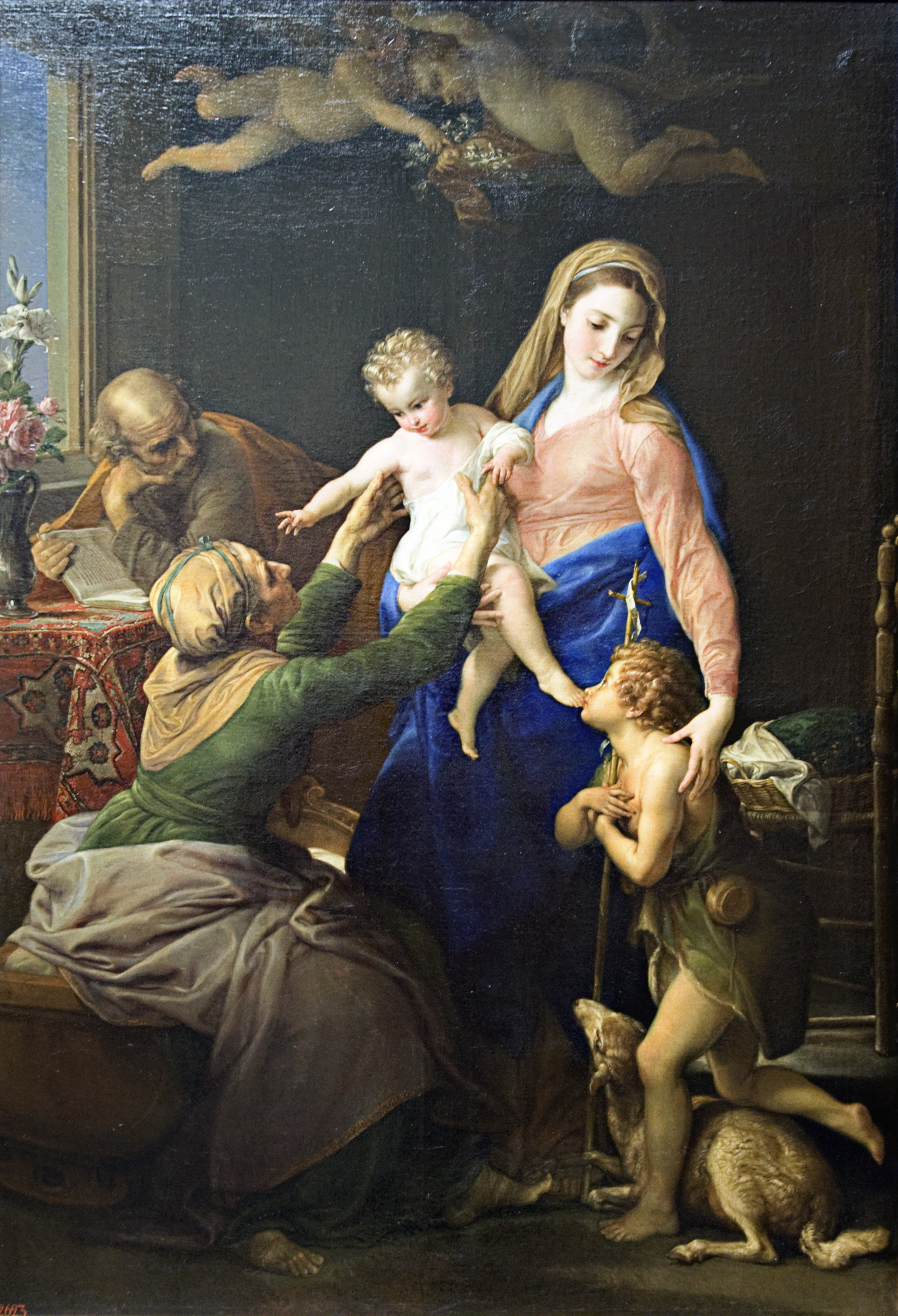
The Holy Family with St Elizabeth and the Infant St John the Baptist, 1777, Hermitage Museum, St Petersburg

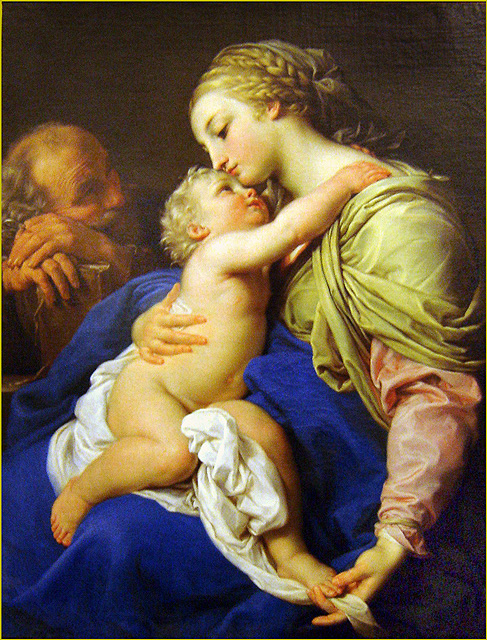
The Sacred Family, ca. 1763, Capitoline Museums, Rome

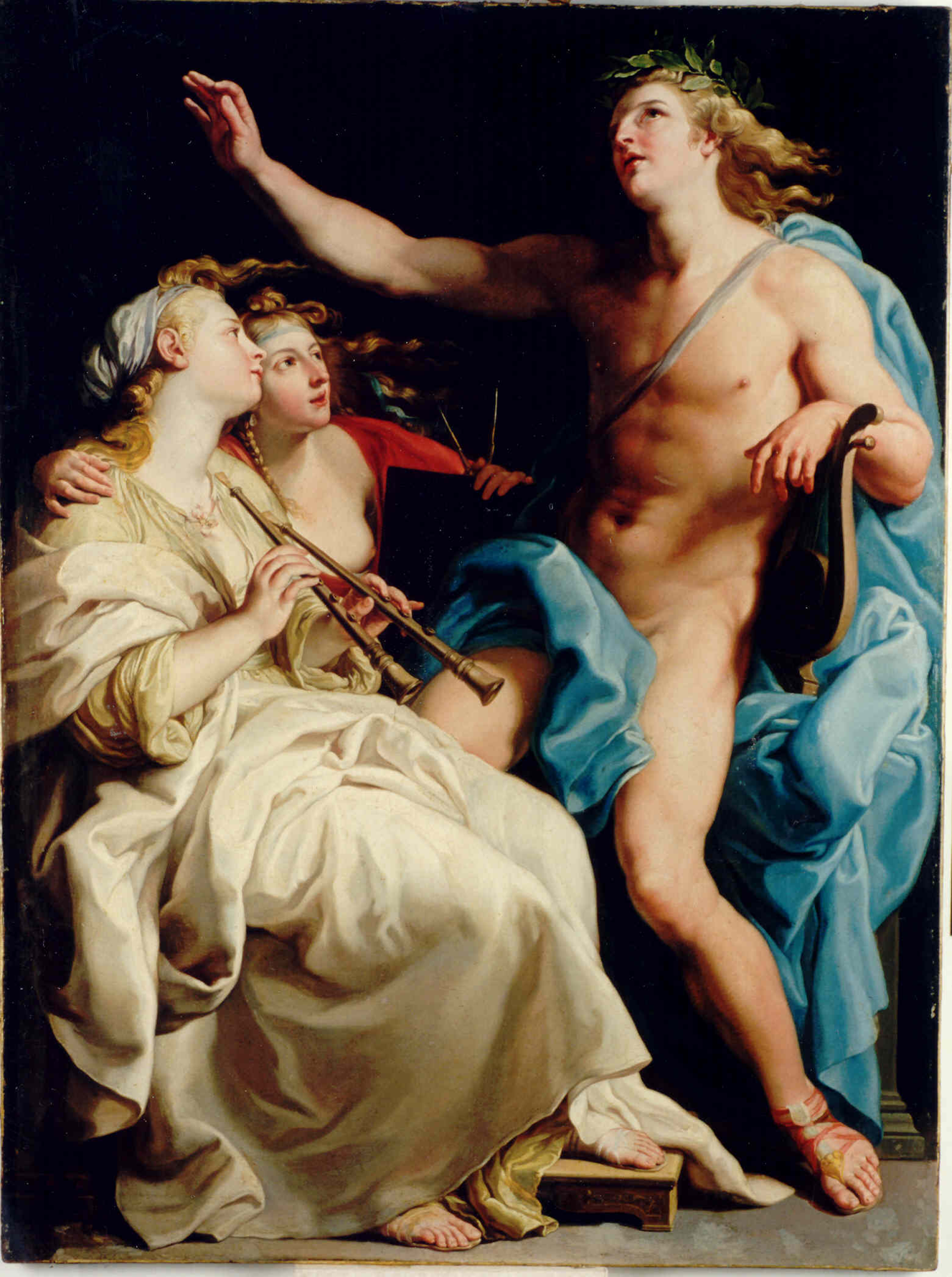
Apollo and two Muses, 1741, King John III Palace Museum, Wilanów, Warsaw

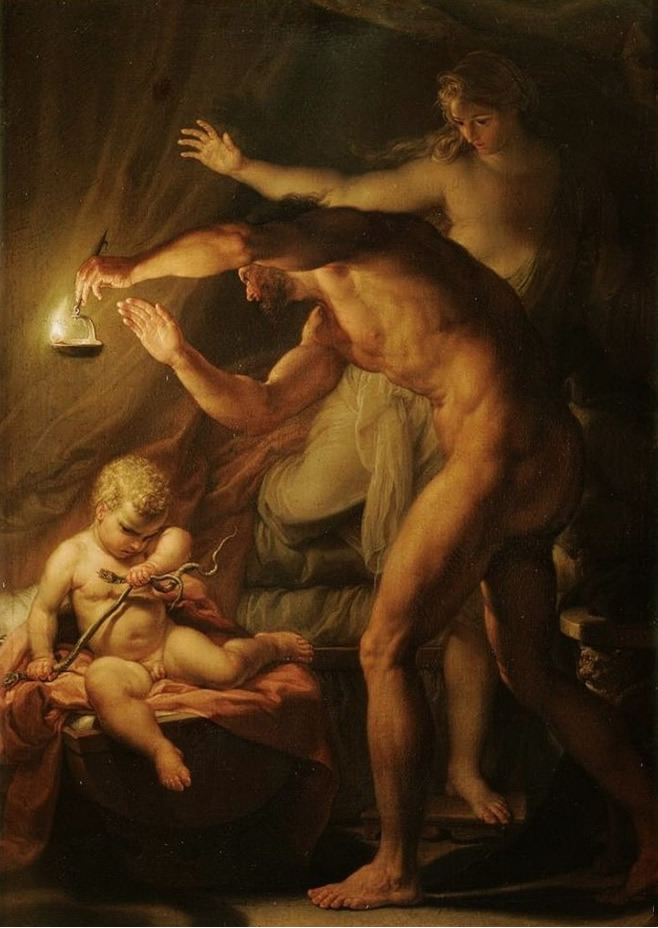
The infant Hercules strangling serpents in his cradle, 1743, Palazzo Pitti, Florence

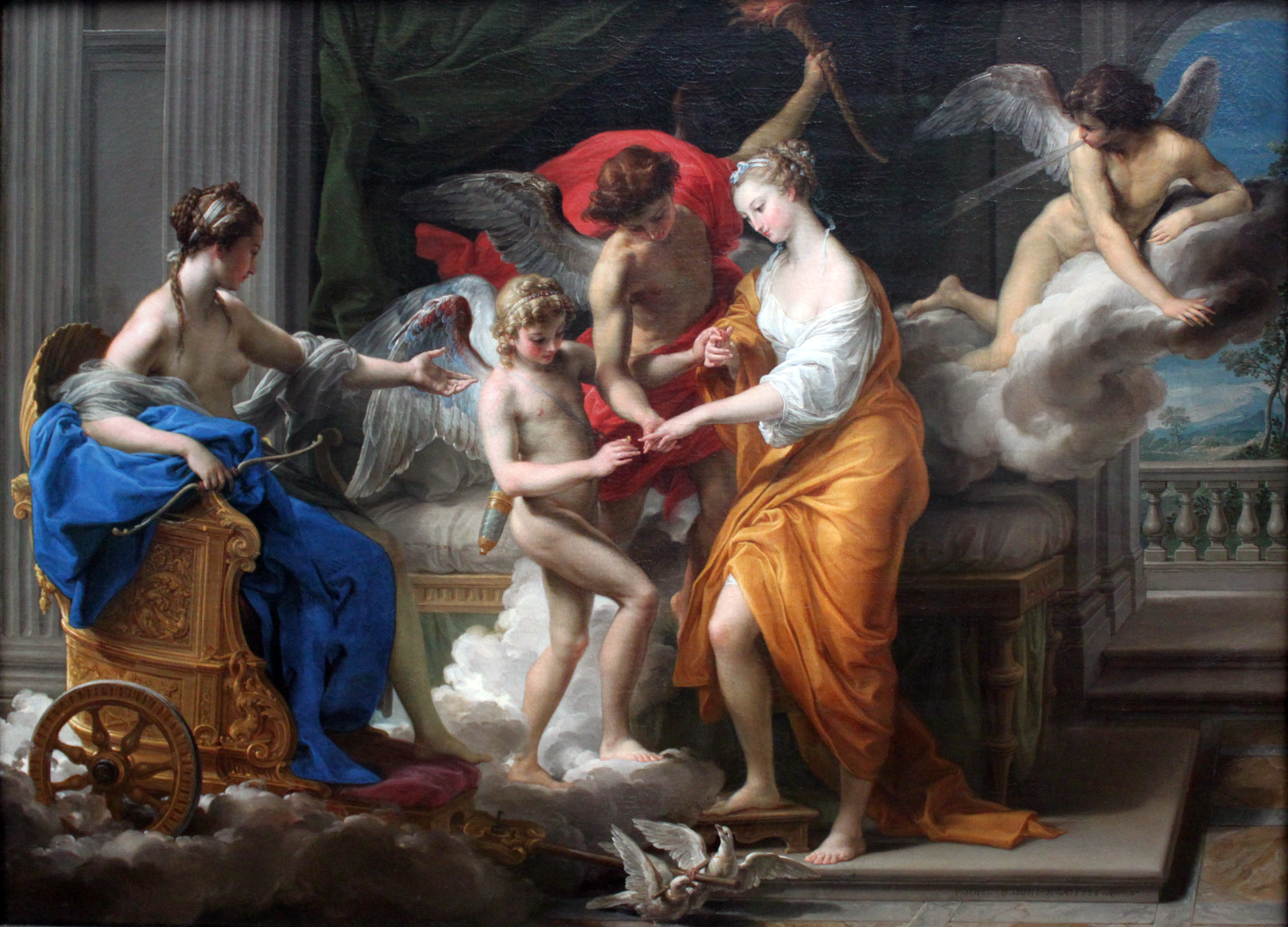
Marriage of Cupid and Psyche, 1756, Berlin State Museums

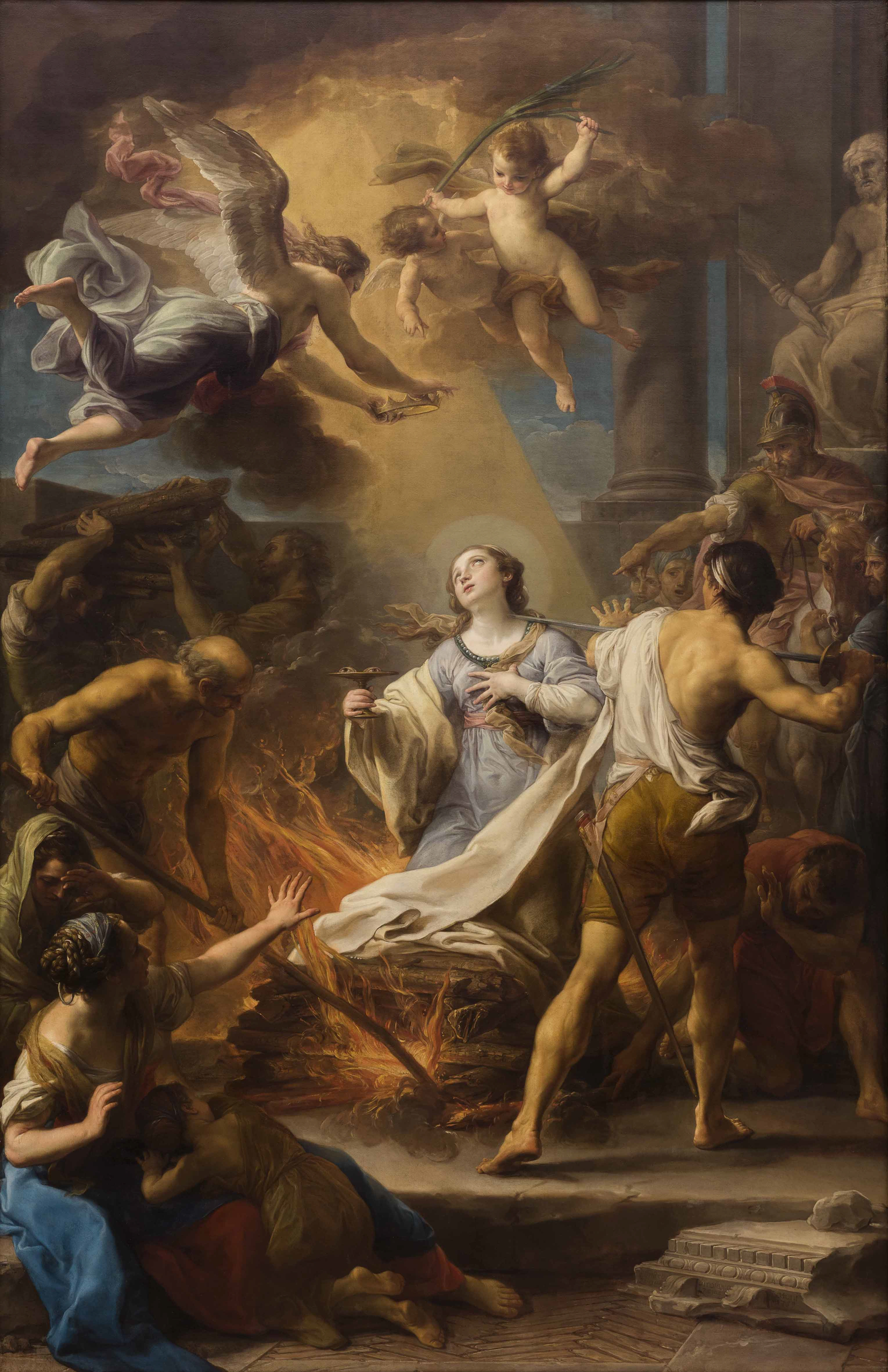
Martyrdom of Saint Lucía, 1759, Real Academia de Bellas Artes de San Fernando, Madrid

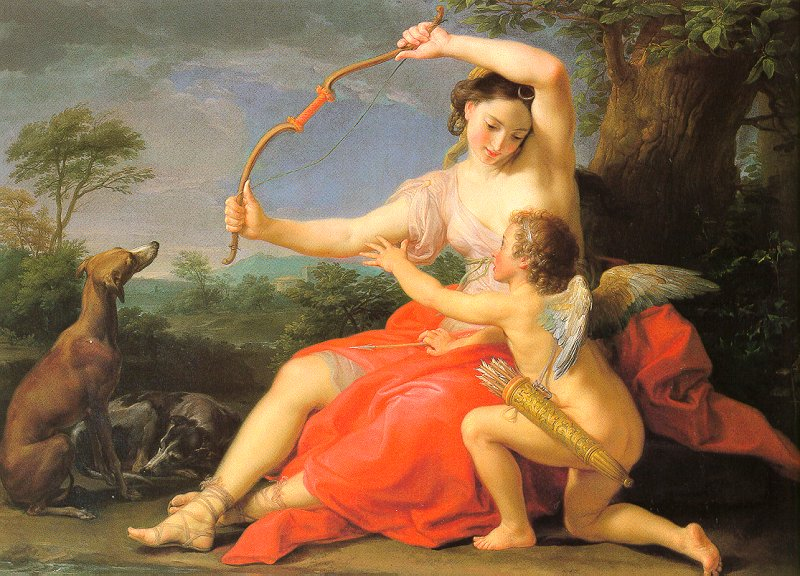
Diana and Cupid, 1761, Metropolitan Museum of Art, New York

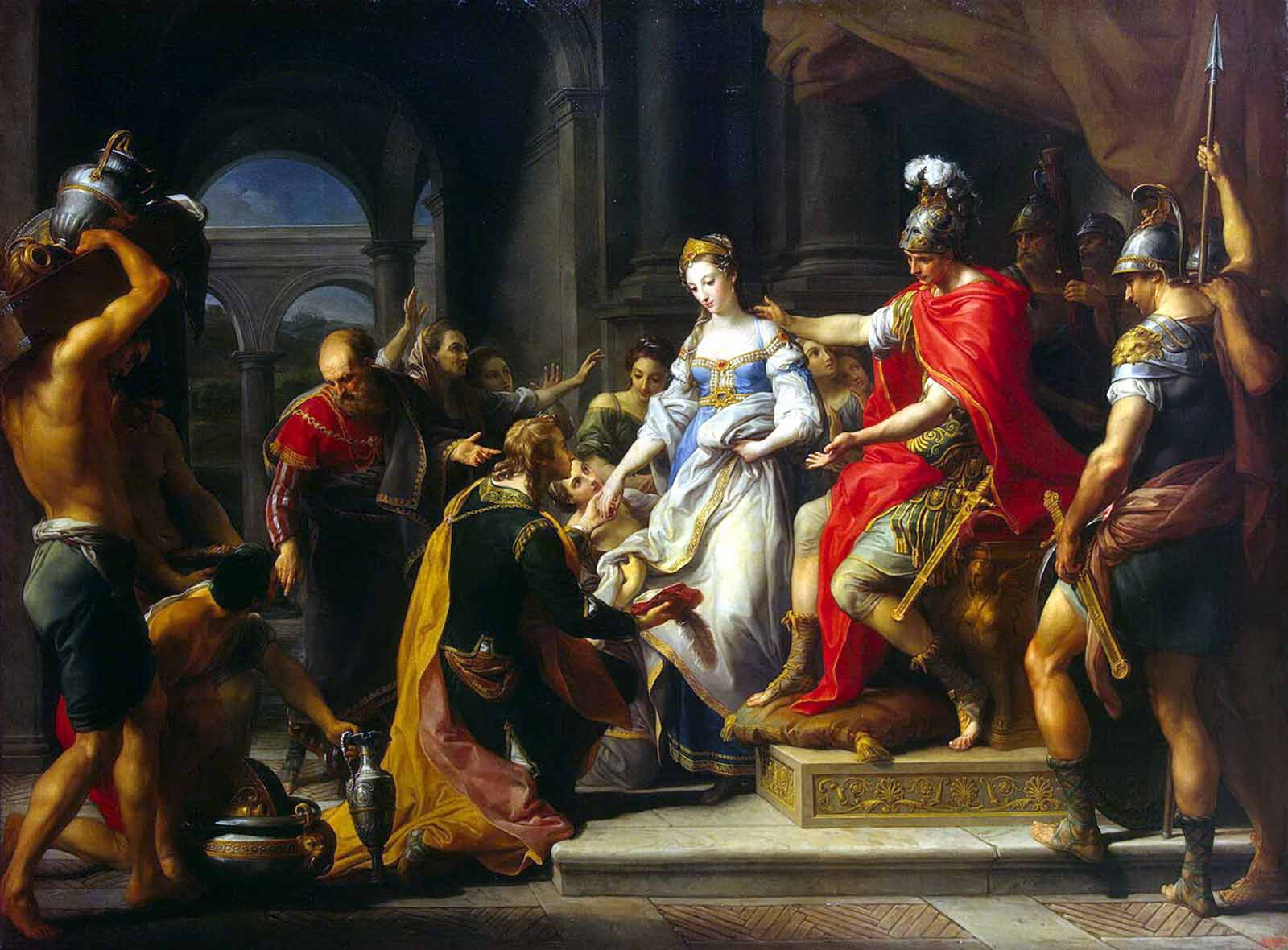
The Continence of Scipio, 1771, Hermitage Museum, Saint Petersburg

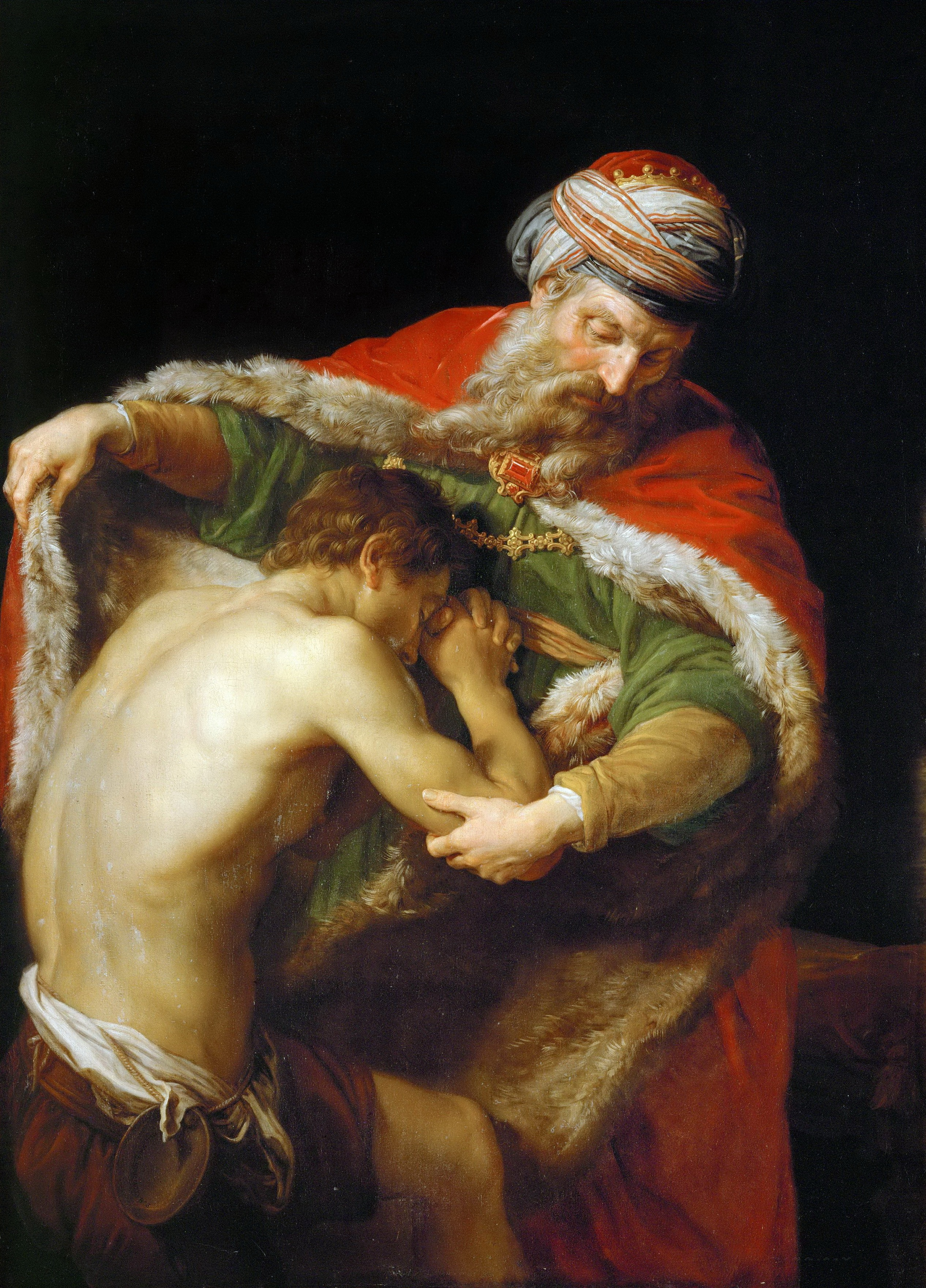
The Return of the Prodigal Son, 1773, Kunsthistorisches Museum Wien

== See also ==
- Sebastiano Conca
- Agostino Masucci
- Francesco Ferdinandi
- Jacopo Zoboli
- Angelo Maria Querini
