= Bowes Museum =

Art gallery and museum in County Durham, England

Coordinates: 54°32′31″N 1°54′55″W

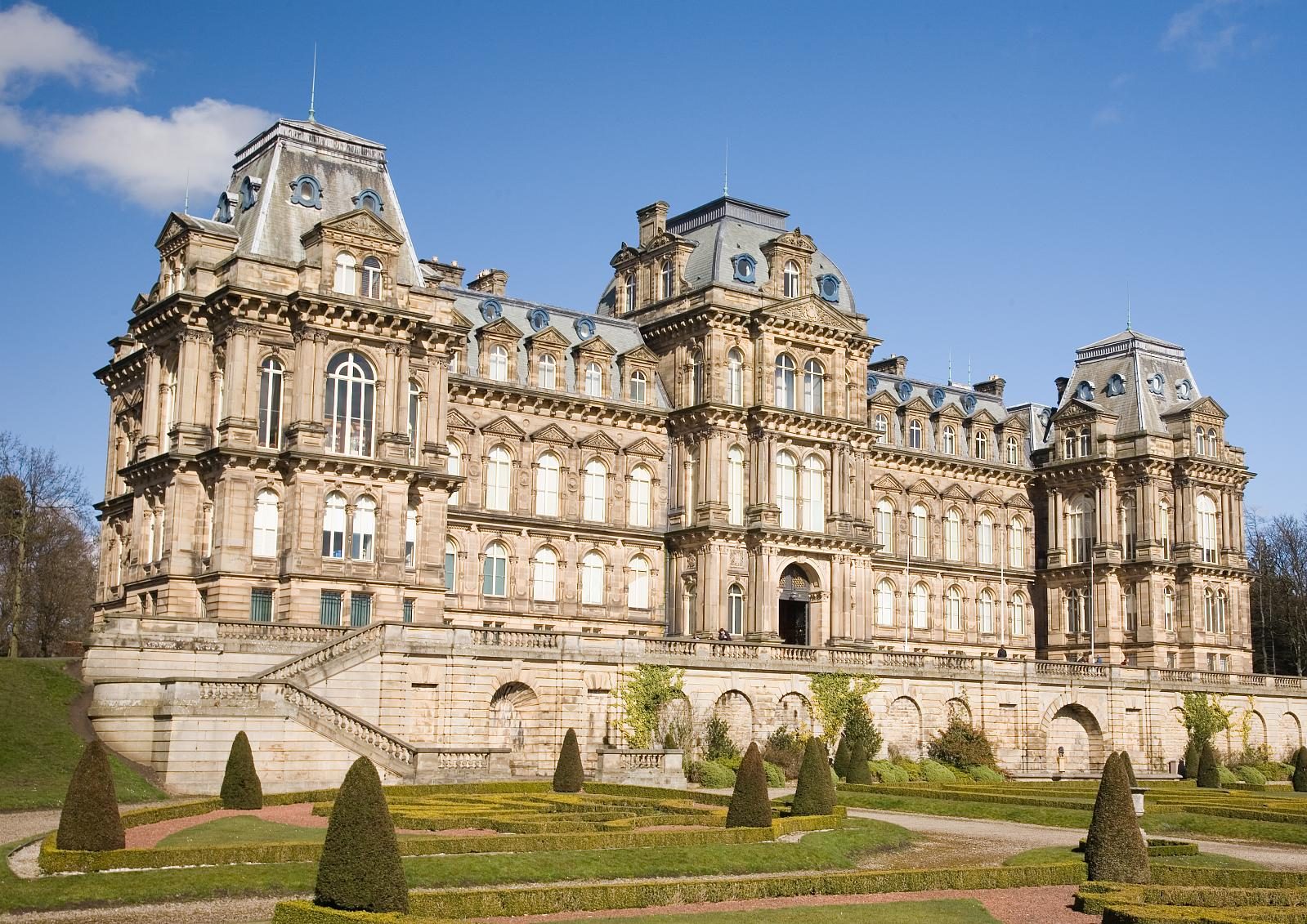
- The building is styled as a French château
- Location: Newgate, Barnard Castle, County Durham, DL12 8NP, England
- Website: thebowesmuseum.org.uk

The Bowes Museum is an art gallery in the town of Barnard Castle, in County Durham in northern England. It was built to designs by Jules Pellechet and John Edward Watson to house the art collection of John Bowes and his wife Joséphine Benoîte Coffin-Chevallier, and opened in 1892.

It contains paintings by El Greco, Francisco Goya, Canaletto, Jean-Honoré Fragonard and François Boucher, together with several collections of decorative art, especially porcelain, textiles, tapestries, clocks and costumes, and objects of local historical interest. Some early works of Émile Gallé were commissioned by Coffin-Chevallier. A popular showpiece is a life-size eighteenth-century Silver Swan automaton, which periodically preens itself, looks round and appears to catch and swallow a fish.

== History ==
The Bowes Museum was purpose-built as a public art gallery for John Bowes and his wife Joséphine Benoîte Coffin-Chevallier, Countess of Montalbo, who both died before it opened in 1892. Bowes was the son of John Bowes, the 10th Earl of Strathmore and Kinghorne, although he did not inherit the title as he was deemed illegitimate under Scottish law. His grandmother was Mary Bowes, Countess of Strathmore and Kinghorne.

It was designed with the collaboration of two architects, the French architect Jules Pellechet and John Edward Watson of Newcastle. The building is richly modelled, with large windows, engaged columns, projecting bays, and mansard roofs typical of the French Second Empire, set within landscaped gardens. An account in 1901 described it as "... some 500 feet in length by 50 feet high, and is designed in the French style of the First Empire. Its contents are priceless, consisting of unique Napoleon relics, splendid picture galleries, a collection of old china, not to be matched anywhere else in the world, jewels of incredible beauty and value; and, indeed, a wonderful and rare collection of art objects of every kind."

A less favourable opinion was expressed by Nikolaus Pevsner, who considered it to be "... big, bold and incongruous, looking exactly like the town hall of a major provincial town in France. In scale it is just as gloriously inappropriate for the town to which it belongs (and to which it gives some international fame) as in style".

Construction on the building began in 1869; Bowes and his wife left an endowment and 800 paintings. Their collection of European fine and decorative arts amounted to 15,000 pieces.

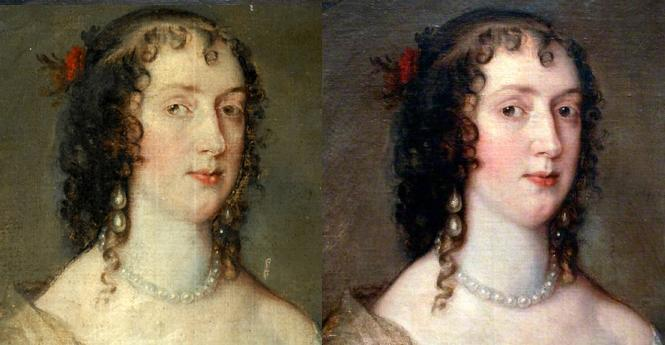
Portrait of Olivia Porter by Anthony van Dyck before and after restoration. The version on the left was the photo posted to the Your Paintings website, where it was spotted by Dr Bendor Grosvenor.

A major redevelopment of the Bowes Museum began in 2005, including new galleries (Fashion & Textiles, Silver and English Interiors) and study/learning facilities. The three art galleries on the second floor were updated at the same time.

The museum holds temporary exhibitions, and has shown works by Monet, Raphael, Turner, Sisley, Gallé, William Morris, and Toulouse-Lautrec.

The BBC announced in 2013 that a Portrait of Olivia Porter was a previously unknown Anthony van Dyck painting. It had been found in the Bowes Museum storeroom by art historian Dr. Bendor Grosvenor who had observed it on-line at the Your Paintings web site. The painting itself was covered in layers of varnish and dirt, and had not been renovated. It was originally thought to be a copy, and valued at between £3,000 to £5,000. Christopher Brown, director of the Ashmolean Museum, confirmed it was a van Dyck after it had been restored.

Selection of paintings

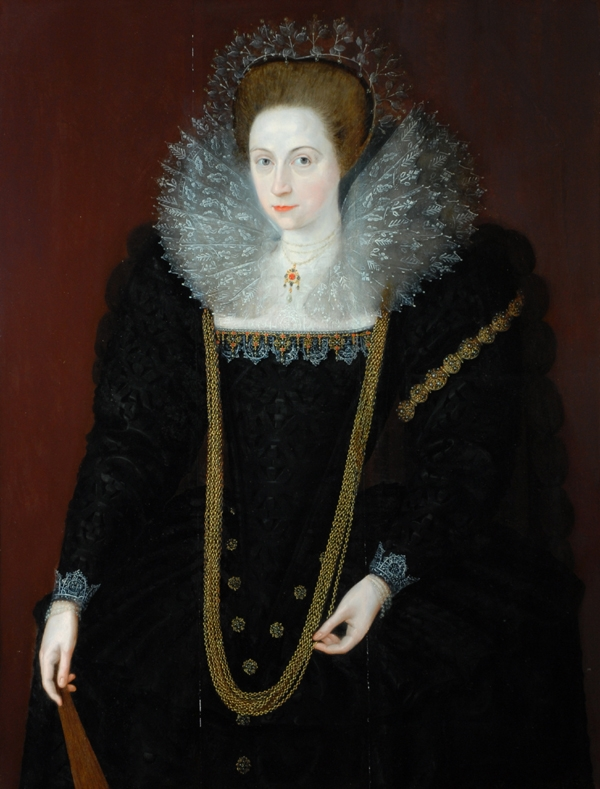
Attributed to Marcus Gheeraerts the Younger, Portrait of a Lady (unknown date)

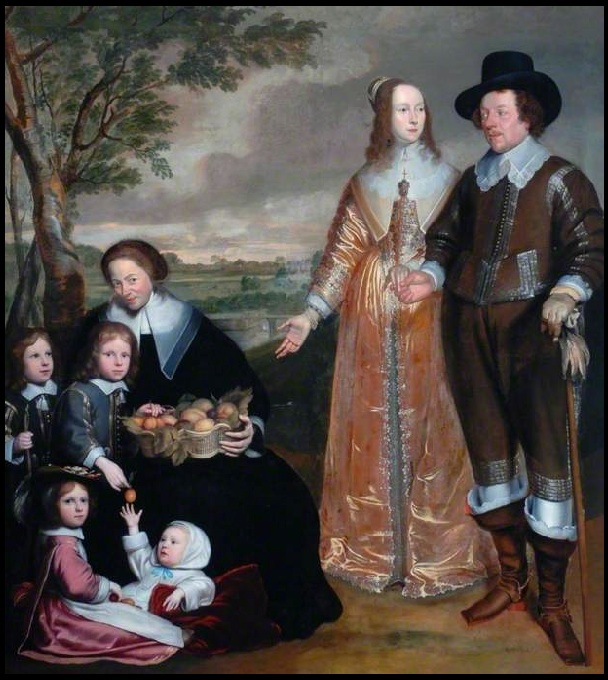
Anselm van Hulle, Family Portrait Group (1640–1650)

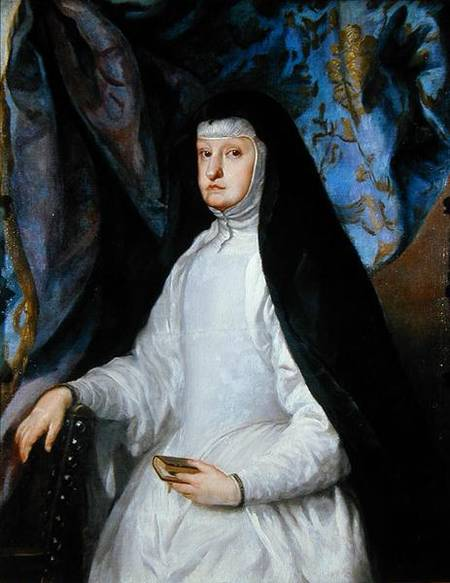
Claudio Coello, La reina madre doña Mariana de Austria, circa 1687

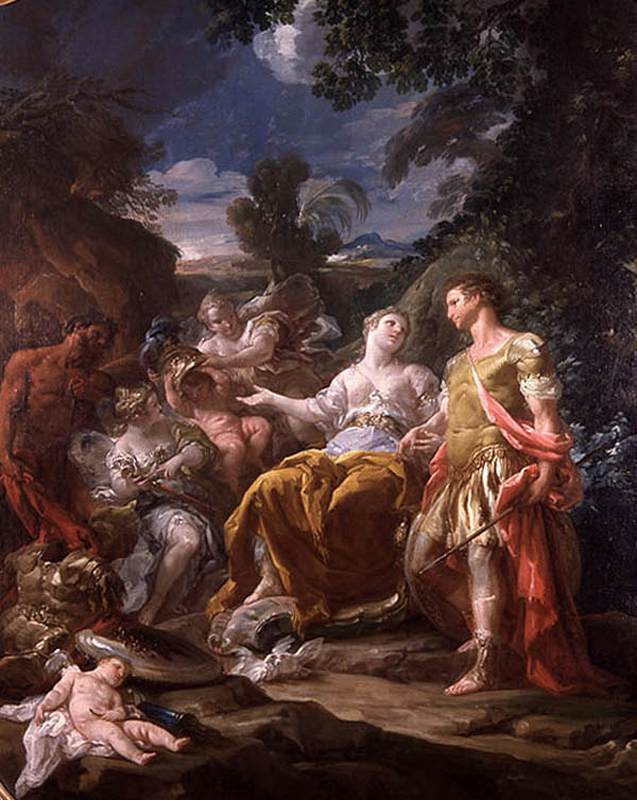
Corrado Giaquinto, Venus Presenting Arms to Aeneas, 1750

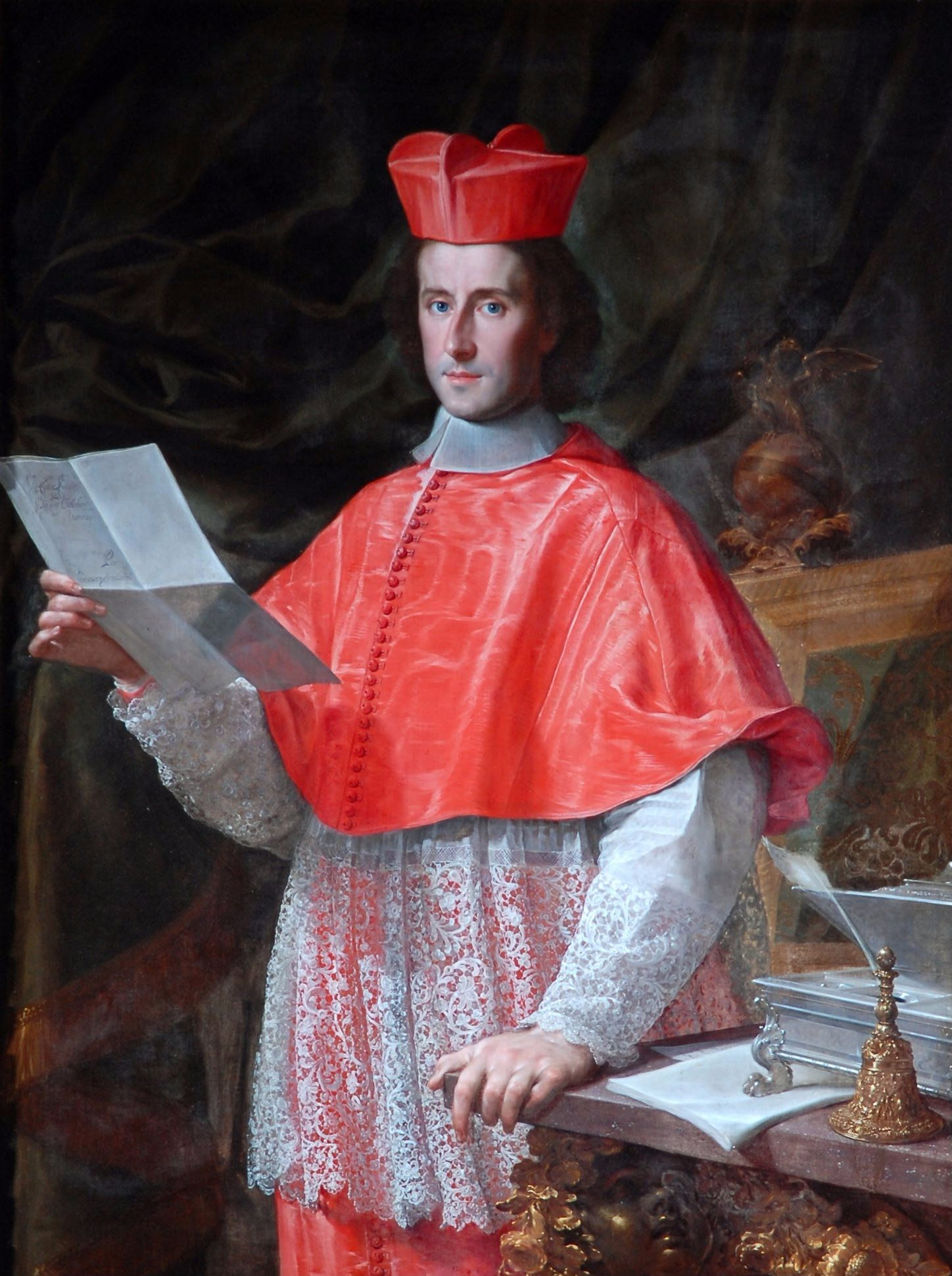
Francesco Trevisani, Portrait of Cardinal Pietro Ottoboni, 1700

== Financial activities ==
The museum is a registered charity. During the financial year of 2023–2024, it raised approx. £4.3 million and had expenditure of approx. £3.3 million. The museum is also active in retail sales and restaurant facilities.

In April 2025, the 75-year old Friends of Bowes Museum announced that their organisation would cease operations, citing falling membership numbers, reduced income, and a lack of volunteers.
