= Art UK =

Arts charity in the UK

- Formation: 2003
- Type: Charity
- Purpose: To create a complete digital record of the UK's collection of oil, tempera and acrylic paintings and sculpture and to make art accessible to the public.
- Location: Monument, London
- Region served: United Kingdom
- Website: artuk.org

Art UK is a cultural, education charity in the United Kingdom, previously known as the Public Catalogue Foundation. Since 2003, it has digitised more than 1 million paintings, sculptures and other artworks by more than 70,000 artists.

It was founded for the project, completed between 2003 and 2012, of obtaining sufficient rights to enable the public to see images of all the approximately 210,000 oil paintings in public ownership in the United Kingdom. Originally the paintings were made accessible through a series of affordable book catalogues, mostly by county. Later the same images and information were placed on a website in partnership with the BBC, originally called Your Paintings, hosted as part of the BBC website. The renaming in 2016 coincided with the transfer of the website to a stand-alone site. Works by some 70,000 painters held in more than 3,400 collections are now on the website.

The catalogues and website allow readers to see an illustration, normally in colour, and short description of every painting and sculpture in the UK's national collections. This information has significant educational benefits and constitutes the building blocks for later art historical research.

Revenue from catalogue sales made by collections is dedicated to the conservation and restoration of oil paintings in their care. Coverage includes national and local museums and council collections, paintings in universities, bishops' palaces of the Church of England, hospitals, the properties owned by the National Trust, and some other private institutions such as the colleges of Oxford and Cambridge universities. The collections of bodies such as Arts Council England, English Heritage and the Government Art Collection are included. However, the Royal Collection is not included.

Art UK receives major funding from the Heritage Lottery Fund and other sources.

In November 2016, Apollo magazine awarded Art UK the prize of "Digital Innovation of the Year". It was given the "Digital Innovation of the Year" award again in 2022 in recognition of its achievement of cataloguing the UK's public sculpture. Artist Yinka Shonibare was Art UK's 2019 patron and has praised the charity's efforts, "public sculpture is the most democratic way to share art [...] it transcends race, class, or economic status".

Art UK is one of three partners in the Museum Data Service, launched in September 2024.

== Catalogue series ==
Of the 210,000 oil paintings in public ownership in the UK, around 80% are not on public view. Many are held in storage or civic buildings without routine public access. At the same time, many of these collections have incomplete cataloguing records; very few have more than a small proportion of their paintings photographed, and hardly any collection has a complete illustrated catalogue of its oil paintings in book form or online. Since 2003, The Public Catalogue Foundation has been working to rectify this through a series of colour catalogues. Before these were completed it was clear that a website was the best way to reach the wider public, a key aim of the project, so a combined approach was adopted.

The Oil Paintings in Public Ownership book series is published by The PCF mainly on a collection or county-by-county basis. Each volume brings together all the oil, acrylic and tempera paintings in a county's museum collections, together with paintings held in civic buildings such as town halls, libraries, universities, hospitals and fire stations. Each county catalogue contains a colour photograph and basic information about each painting. All paintings are reproduced regardless of quality or condition.

The PCF's first catalogue was published in June 2004, and the series is now complete in 85 volumes (see partial list below).

== Collaboration with BBC ==
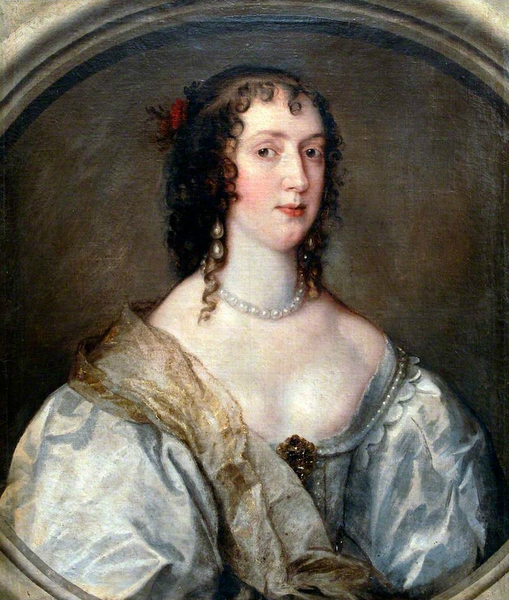
The Your Paintings website facilitated the discovery of this previously unknown portrait of Olivia Porter painted by Anthony van Dyck.

The Public Catalogue Foundation worked with the BBC to put all of the UK's publicly owned oil paintings online. In January 2009 a partnership with the BBC was announced with the aim to place the entire catalogue of publicly owned oil paintings online by 2012. On 4 October 2012 it was announced that the project had photographed every painting that it intended to and all 210,000 would shortly be available.

A section of the BBC website, Your Paintings, was launched in 2011. The PCF completed the digitisation of the entire national collection and celebrated their success in February 2013. An innovative crowdsourcing project, Your Paintings Tagger, also went online in 2011, to generate the metadata necessary to make Your Paintings fully searchable. The high-quality digital files, however, have not been made available to the public, and paintings on the BBC site can only be "saved" as a "personal collection" on the site, not downloaded.

In March 2013 the BBC revealed that an unknown painting by Anthony van Dyck had been discovered because of the Your Paintings website. The painting of Olivia Porter, wife of Sir Endymion Porter, had been discovered on-line and although it was previously thought it to be in the style of the Van Dyck, experts now agreed that the painting was an unknown original. Olivia, the subject of the painting, who died in 1663, was a lady-in-waiting to queen consort Henrietta Maria. She had married Endymion Porter, who was a patron of Anthony van Dyck. A Culture Show TV programme noted that the painting had not previously been published and it was the Your Paintings website that had allowed this attribution.

Art UK collaborates in making the BBC Four television series Britain's Lost Masterpieces.

== Sculpture project ==
Art UK helped the UK to become the first country in the world to offer a digital collection of publicly owned sculpture, with the first records appearing on the site from February 2019. The site aimed at the time to have made 150,000 sculptures viewable by the end of 2020. As of early 2023, however, the number of sculptures listed on Art UK was just over 50,000, over 13,500 of which are outdoor public sculptures and monuments. All of the recorded sculptures included date from the last 1,000 years.

The organisation published its first annual report on new sculpture unveilings in early 2023. The report found that "one in five statues unveiled in 2022 were dedicated to people of Black, Asian and other ethnicities, helping to redress historic imbalances of people celebrated in public art."

== Book catalogues ==
The earlier catalogues published are listed below. (Full listing available online.)

- Oil paintings in public ownership in West Yorkshire: Leeds, The Public Catalogue Foundation, Lucy Ellis, 2004, ISBN 9781904931003
- Oil Paintings in Public Ownership in Kent, The Public Catalogue Foundation, 2004 ISBN 9781904931027
- Oil paintings in public ownership in West Sussex, The Public Catalogue Foundation, 2005, ISBN 9781904931041
- Oil paintings in public ownership in London: The Slade School of Fine Art & University College London Art Collections, The Public Catalogue Foundation, 2005, ISBN 9781904931065
- Oil paintings in public ownership in East Sussex, The Public Catalogue Foundation, 2005, ISBN 9781904931089
- Oil paintings in public ownership in Suffolk, The Public Catalogue Foundation, Andrew Ellis, Sonia Roe, Alan Grundy, 2005, ISBN 9781904931102
- Oil paintings in public ownership in North Yorkshire, The Public Catalogue Foundation, Andrew Ellis, Sonia Roe, Lucy Denton, Sally Pelham, 2006, ISBN 9781904931225
- Oil paintings in public ownership in Cambridgeshire: The Fitzwilliam Museum, The Public Catalogue Foundation, Andrew Ellis, Sonia Roe, 2006, ISBN 9781904931126
- Oil paintings in public ownership in Surrey, The Public Catalogue Foundation, Andrew Ellis, Stella Sharp, Sonia Roe, 2006, ISBN 9781904931249
- Oil paintings in public ownership in Norfolk, The Public Catalogue Foundation, Andrew Ellis, Sonia Roe, 2006, ISBN 9781904931201
- Oil Paintings in Public Ownership in Essex, The Public Catalogue Foundation, Andrew Ellis, Sonia Roe, 2007, ISBN 9781904931140
- Oil paintings in public ownership in the Imperial War Museum, The Public Catalogue Foundation, Andy Ellis, Sonia Roe, 2006, ISBN 9781904931287
- Oil paintings in public ownership in the Victoria and Albert Museum, The Public Catalogue Foundation, Andrew Ellis, Sonia Roe, 2008, ISBN 9781904931409
- Oil paintings in public ownership in Hampshire: Southampton & the Isle of Wight, The Public Catalogue Foundation, Andrew Ellis, Sonia Roe, 2007, ISBN 9781904931188
- Hampshire (excluding Southampton): Oil paintings in public ownership in Hampshire, The Public Catalogue Foundation, Andrew Ellis, Sonia Roe, Elizabeth Vickers, 2007, ISBN 9781904931164
- Oil paintings in public ownership in Cornwall & the Isles of Scilly: under the Royal Patronage of Her Royal Highness the Duchess of Cornwall, The Public Catalogue Foundation, Sonia Roe, Steve Tanner, 2007, ISBN 9781904931317
- West Yorkshire (excluding Leeds):Oil paintings in public ownership in West Yorkshire, The Public Catalogue Foundation, Sonia Roe, 2007, ISBN 9781904931263
- Oil paintings in public ownership in Staffordshire, The Public Catalogue Foundation, Sonia Roe, 2007, ISBN 9781904931348
- Oil paintings in public ownership in the Government Art Collection, The Public Catalogue Foundation, 2007
- Oil paintings in public ownership in Birmingham, The Public Catalogue Foundation, Andrew Ellis, Sonia Roe, 2008, ISBN 9781904931386
- Oil paintings in public ownership in Nottinghamshire, The Public Catalogue Foundation, Andrew Ellis, Sonia Roe, Angharad Jones, 2008, ISBN 9781904931744
- Oil paintings in public ownership in County Durham, The Public Catalogue Foundation, Andrew Ellis, Sonia Roe, Sally Pelham, 2008, ISBN 9781904931485
- Oil Paintings in Public Ownership in the City of London, The Public Catalogue Foundation, Sonia Roe, 2008, ISBN 9781904931775
- Oil paintings in public ownership in Hertfordshire, The Public Catalogue Foundation, Sonia Roe, 2008, ISBN 9781904931355
- Oil paintings in public ownership in Tyne & Wear Museums, The Public Catalogue Foundation, Andrew Ellis, Sonia Roe, 2008
- Oil Paintings in Public Ownership in Northumberland, Tees Valley & Tyne and Wear, The Public Catalogue Foundation, Andrew Ellis, Sonia Roe, 2009, ISBN 9781904931379
- Oil Paintings in Public Ownership in Warwickshire, The Public Catalogue Foundation, Sonia Roe, 2009, ISBN 9781904931546
- Oil Paintings in Public Ownership in Herefordshire, Worcestershire & Shropshire, The Public Catalogue Foundation, Andrew Ellis, Sonia Roe, 2009, ISBN 9781904931782
- Oil Paintings in Public Ownership in Berkshire, Buckinghamshire & Oxfordshire, The Public Catalogue Foundation, Sonia Roe, 2009, ISBN 9781904931362
- Oil paintings in public ownership in Derbyshire, The Public Catalogue Foundation, John Bather, 2009, ISBN 9781904931508
- Oil Paintings in Public Ownership in Dorset, The Public Catalogue Foundation, Venetia Ross Skinner, Andrew Ellis, Sonia Roe, 2009, ISBN 9781904931478
- Oil Paintings in Public Ownership in Somerset, The Public Catalogue Foundation, Malcolm V. L. Pearce, Andrew Ellis, Sonia Roe, 2011, ISBN 9781904931522
- Oil Paintings in Public Ownership: In Bedfordshire, Cambridgeshire & Northamptonshire, The Public Catalogue Foundation, 2010, ISBN 9781904931461
- Oil Paintings in Public Ownership in East Riding of Yorkshire, The Public Catalogue Foundation, 2012, ISBN 9781904931775
- Oil Paintings in Public Ownership in Gloucestershire & Wiltshire, The Public Catalogue Foundation, 2012, ISBN 9781904931560

Revenues generated from catalogue sales at participating collections is nearly all used for painting restoration and gallery education. The project's overall income is used to help fund upcoming catalogues, as most funding is generated from private donations.

== Board of trustees ==
Members

- Thomas Davies
- Hasan Bakhshi
- Carola Boehm
- Caroline Campbell
- Jago Cooper
- Catherine Holden
- Thomas Marks
- Avril Martindale
- Sherece Rainford
- John Stack
- Ben Terrett (chair)
- Lisa Wong

Past Trustees

- Charles Gregson (chair)
- Rana Begum
- Bob and Roberta Smith, OBE
- Camilla Eden-Davies
- Professor David Ekserdjian
- Fred Hohler (founder and honorary trustee)
- Charles Saumarez Smith
- Graham Southern
- Alex Morrison
- Kathleen Soriano (chair)
- George Entwistle (Vice Chair)
- Kim Streets
- Bob Lisney, OBE
- Ian Cuerden
- Noura Al-Maashouq
- Errol Francis
- Clare Lilley
- Andria Zafirakou, MBE
