= Joséphine Bowes =

French-born actress, artist, collector, philanthropist

Joséphine Bowes Countess of Montalbo, San Marino
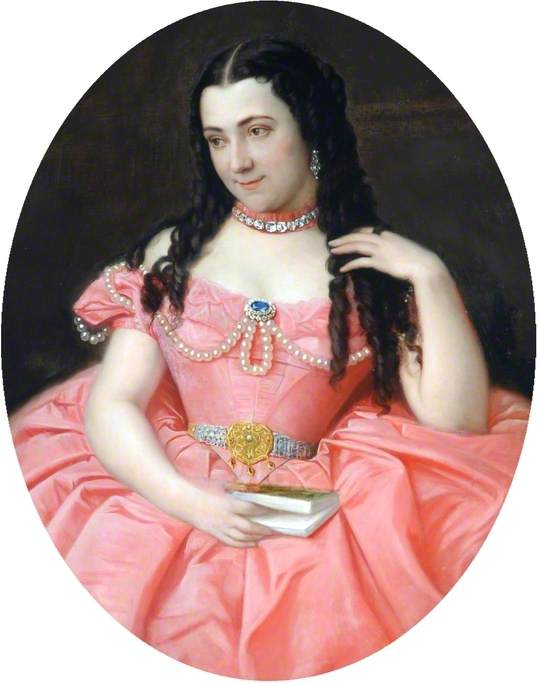
- Portrait of Bowes by Louis William Desanges
- Born: Joséphine Benoite Coffin-Chevallier; 1825; Paris, France
- Died: 9 February 1874 (aged 48–49); Paris, France
- Burial place: Gibside, England
- Occupations: Actress, painter, collector, patron of the arts
- Known for: Co-founded the Bowes Museum
- Spouse: John Bowes

Joséphine Bowes, Countess of Montalbo (born Joséphine Benoîte Coffin-Chevallier; 1825 – 9 February 1874) was a French-born actress, artist, collector and patron of the arts. She was married to fellow collector John Bowes, son of John Bowes, 10th Earl of Strathmore and Kinghorne. She and her husband founded the Bowes Museum in Barnard Castle, Teesdale.

== Early life ==
Joséphine Benoîte Coffin-Chevallier was born in 1825, the daughter of a clockmaker and an actress. She herself became an actress in Paris, appearing under the stage name Mlle. Delorme. She was a vaudeville performer, actress, comedienne, and singer in the Théâtre des Variétés. Coffin-Chevallier met John Bowes, a wealthy landowner, when he purchased—and then managed—the theatre. They found they held a mutual love of the arts, and it is believed that they began a relationship soon after they met in 1847. After they married in 1852, she retired from the stage to concentrate on her painting and art collecting. As a wedding present, John Bowes bought her the former home of one of King Louis XV's mistresses, the Château du Barry, that became their residence.

=== Salon socialite ===
After her marriage to John Bowes, she became a noted hostess. She was considered one of the great salon holders and patrons of the arts in Paris at the time. The Revue Critique wrote of her 1860s gatherings of artists, intellectuals, and French society that 'the salons of Madame Bowes are counted among the most brilliant in Paris'. She was celebrated for her taste in fashion and jewellery, and an 1872 bill from one of her visits to the foremost couturier of the day, Charles Worth, comes to the equivalent of £114,000 in modern (2020) currency.

=== Work with the arts and philanthropy ===
Bowes became a patron of the arts on a grand scale, and is known to have commissioned plays from several playwrights of the time. She was also gifted in recognising what art works would become the next sensation, buying impressionist works before impressionism had made a great impact.

Bowes was a talented amateur artist who studied under the landscape painter Karl Josef Kuwasseg. She eventually became a skilled artist, with her work exhibited on four occasions in the late 1860s at the Académie des Beaux-Arts in Paris and once at the Royal Academy in London—an unusual achievement for a woman of the time. The Bowes Museum still holds fifty-five of her paintings in its collection, most of which are landscapes.

Joséphine Bowes, Countess

== Founding the Bowes Museum ==
In the 1860s, the Bowes conceived the idea of founding a museum filled with the already substantial collections of John's. Joséphine's vision was to create a place where the local coal miners and farmers could encounter fine art and improve their lives. She sold the Chateau du Barry in order to raise funds for the project, and is known to have sold some of the most valuable of her diamonds in order to fund the completion of the museum. She is widely credited by the museum as the driving force behind the project. The pair began the collection specifically destined for a museum in Bowes' ancestral lands in Teesdale in 1862. The couple commissioned the architect Jules Pellechet, who had already worked with them in France, to design a museum in Barnard Castle, which was the town nearest to John's family home, Streatlam Castle.

In the next twelve years, fifteen thousand objects were purchased to fill the projected building. Bowes collected pieces across a broad spectrum. From the records that are left, Bowes collection archivists surmise that Bowes used her own artistic eye in collecting decorative arts pieces such as ceramics, silverware, and tapestries. She also made extensive purchases from the International Exhibitions held in Paris in 1862, 1867, and in London in 1871. Her purchases of paintings benefited from her friendships with young artists, and she also worked with two Parisian dealers, Mme Lepautre and A. Lamer, who left annotated records of their dealings, which are still held by the museum. She purchased works by artists as diverse as El Greco, Cannaletto, Boucher, Anne Vallayer-Coster, Courbet, and Charles Joshua Chaplin.

== Personal life ==
The couple did not have children. In 1868, Her husband purchased the title of Countess of Montalbo for Bowes, from the nation of San Marino, to elevate her status. As an illegitimate son, John Bowes had not inherited his father's titles. They visited his family estates in Durham in the United Kingdom regularly, however, and chose that location to create the art museum to both cater to the local people's need for art and to create a legacy. Bowes had dedicated herself to building up a collection worthy of the museum, buying art which even if not to her taste, she felt was necessary to show in such a location.

At the ceremony to mark the laying of the foundation stone, Bowes reportedly said to her husband: 'I lay the bottom stone, and you, Mr Bowes, will lay the top stone'. Joséphine officially laid the foundation stone of the museum on 27 November 1869, but she was apparently too ill to do so physically, and merely touched it with a trowel. The museum building, in the style of a French chateau, was not completed until 1892. Bowes did not live to see it completed. She had experienced bouts of ill health since the 1850s, and died of lung disease at the age of forty-eight in Paris on 9 February 1874. Even in the last days of her life, she is known to have spent time ensuring new items of the museum collection were sent to Teesdale. John Bowes died in October 1885 at Streatlam, and was interred next to Joséphine at Gibside.
