= Portrait of Olivia Porter =

Painting by Anthony van Dyck

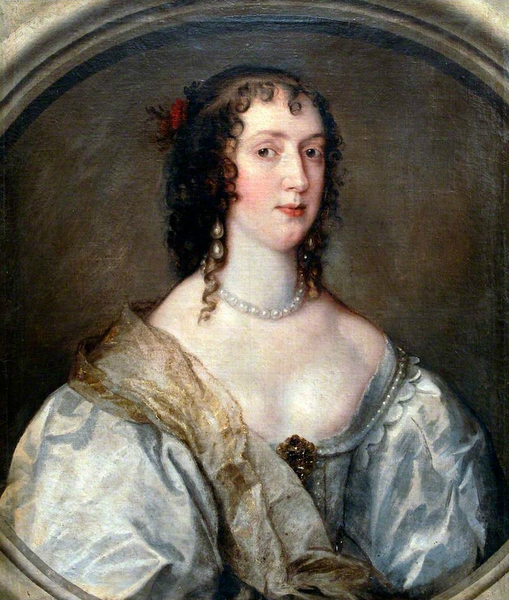
- Artist: Anthony van Dyck
- Year: 1630s (est)
- Medium: Oil on canvas
- Subject: Olivia Porter, née Boteler
- Dimensions: 72.4 cm × 61 cm (28.5 in × 24 in)
- Condition: Renovated
- Location: Bowes Museum; Barnard Castle, Teesdale
- Owner: Bowes Museum
- Website: artuk.org/discover/artworks/olivia-boteler-porter-d-1633-44470

The Portrait of Olivia Porter is an oil painting on canvas by Anthony van Dyck, showing Olivia, Lady Porter, the wife of Sir Endymion Porter, daughter of John Boteler, 1st Baron Boteler of Bramfield, and niece of the Duke of Buckingham, a zealous Roman Catholic and a lady in waiting to Henrietta Maria of France, queen consort to Charles I of England. It was discovered on the Your Paintings website by Bendor Grosvenor after being documented by the Public Catalogue Foundation.

== Background ==
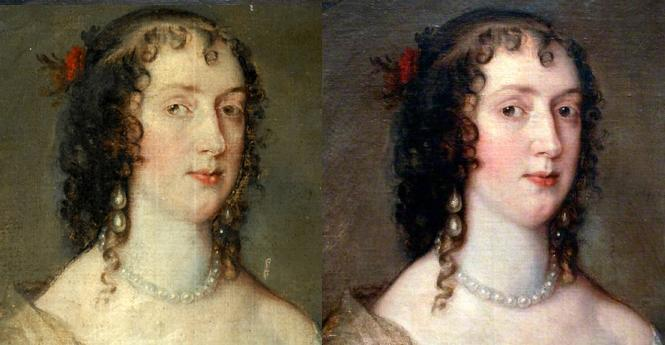
Portrait of Olivia Porter by Anthony van Dyck before and after restoration. The version on the left was the photograph originally posted to the Your Paintings website.

The Public Catalogue Foundation formed in 2003, with the objective of documenting all oil paintings in public ownership within the United Kingdom. This objective was reached in 2012, with work beginning on transferring all 210,000 paintings to a website. The website was created in conjunction with the BBC, and was entitled "Your Paintings".

In March 2013, the BBC announced that a previously unknown painting by van Dyck had been found in public ownership through the website. Filmed for the BBC Two programme Culture Show, art historian Bendor Grosvenor investigated the painting after originally spotting it online. It was discovered in Bowes Museum, Teesside, but was being held in storage and was not on display. The painting itself was covered in layers of varnish and dirt, and had not been renovated. It was originally thought to be a copy, and valued at between £3,000 to £5,000. Christopher Brown, director of the Ashmolean Museum, confirmed it was a van Dyck after it had been restored.

The painting was revalued after being renovated and identified as a van Dyck, with Grosvenor suggesting it should be insured for up to £1 million (then about US$1.62 million). It was identified as being of Olivia Porter, who was a lady in waiting to Henrietta Maria, the queen consort of Charles I of England. Porter was the wife of Sir Endymion Porter, who was a friend of Anthony van Dyck.

== See also ==
- List of paintings by Anthony van Dyck
