= Portrait of a Violinist =

Painting by Anne Vallayer-Coster

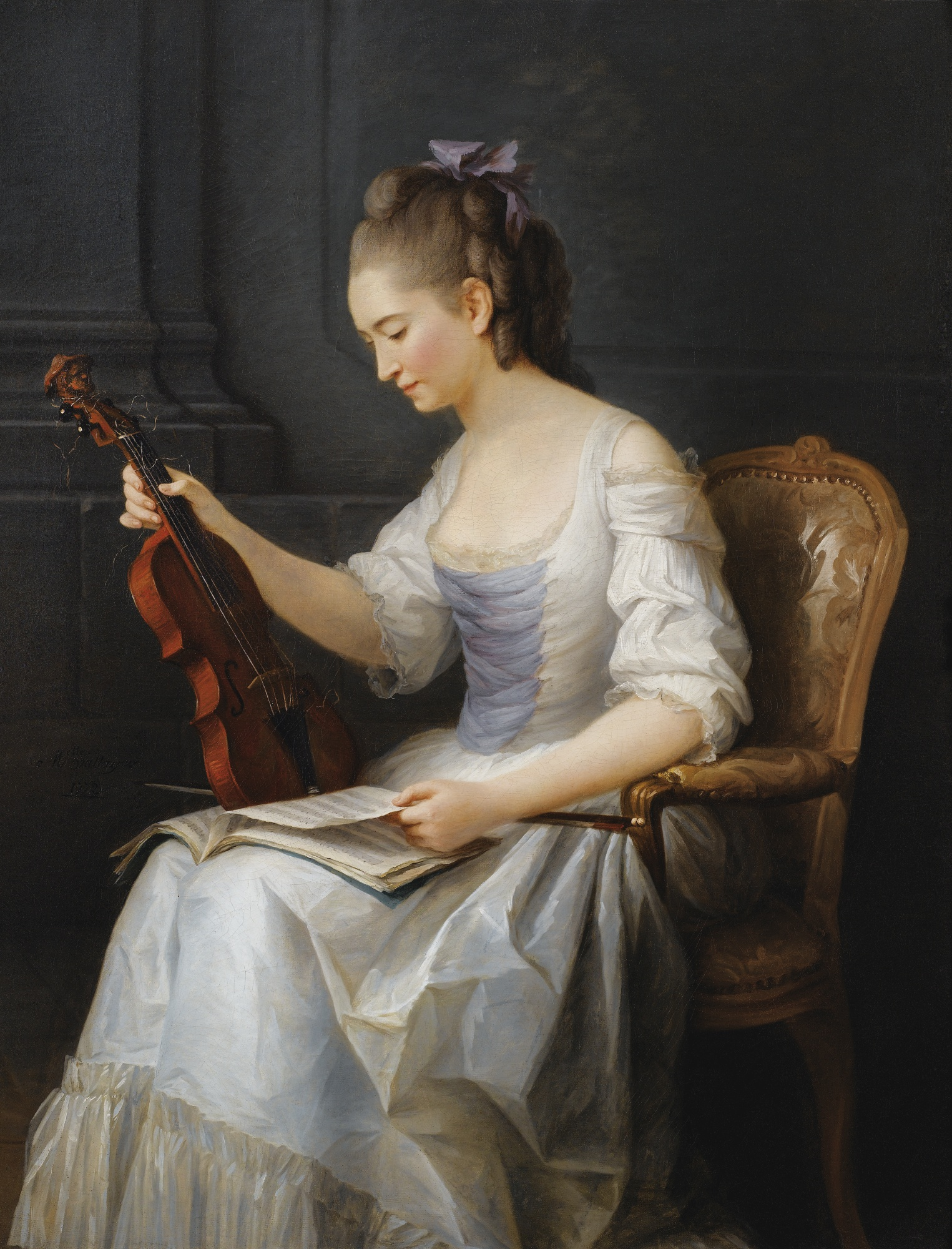
- Artist: Anne Vallayer-Coster
- Year: 1773
- Medium: Oil on canvas
- Dimensions: 116 cm × 96 cm (46 in × 38 in)
- Location: Nationalmuseum, Stockholm

Portrait of a Violinist is a 1773 oil on canvas painting by the French artist Anne Vallayer-Coster in the Nationalmuseum, Stockholm.

This painting shows a seated woman with an instrument similar to a violin bent over a music book. Vallayer did not marry until 1781 and therefore was probably still working alongside family members when this was painted. Vallayer expert Marianne Roland-Michel has speculated that the woman in the painting was possibly one of her sisters, as Vallayer's rare portraits tended to be from her inner circle. It is unknown whether her sisters were musicians, however. Vallayer was admitted to the Académie Royale de Peinture et de Sculpture in 1770 on the basis of her still life paintings, several of which are still in the collection of the Louvre, including a still life of musical instruments that shows a similar violin:

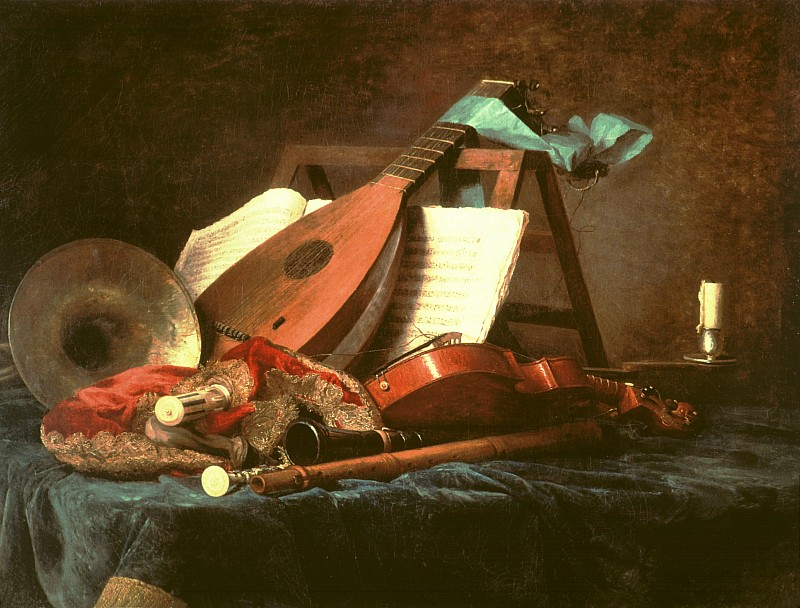
Attributes of Music, Louvre, 1770

The violin-like instrument has six strings and frets, which is more typical of the viol family, and is rather like a viola da braccio so, despite the name of the painting, it is not a conventional violin.

This portrait painting was purchased for EUR 903,000 at auction in 2015 by the Swedish museum that also owns two of her still lifes. Its price was a world record for paintings by Vallayer. At the same sale, another world record for a painting by a woman was achieved, and it was a still life by Louise Moillon for EUR 1,083,000.

According to the provenance listed by the auction house, the painting was one of many sold in 1783 by Jean-Benjamin de La Borde a violinist and composer who had been premier valet de chambre for Louis XV.
