= Alexander Sturgis =

British art historian and museum curator (born 1963)

Alexander Sturgis CBE
- Born: 6 November 1963 (age 62); London, England, United Kingdom
- Other names: Xa Sturgis; The Great Xa
- Education: University College, Oxford; Courtauld Institute of Art
- Occupations: Curator; Museum director
- Employer(s): National Gallery; Holburne Museum; Ashmolean Museum
- Title: Director of the Ashmolean Museum
- Predecessor: Christopher Brown

Alexander John Sturgis CBE (born 6 November 1963) is a British art historian and museum curator. He is currently Director of the Ashmolean Museum in Oxford and was Director of the Holburne Museum in Bath from 2005 to 2014.

== Early life ==
Sturgis was born on 6 November 1963 in London, England. He was educated at Marlborough College, a private school in Marlborough, Wiltshire. He studied history at University College, University of Oxford from 1982 to 1985. He graduated with a Bachelor of Arts (BA) degree, which was later promoted to a Master of Arts (Oxford, Cambridge, and Dublin) (MA Oxon) degree. He undertook post-graduate study in art history at the Courtauld Institute of Art in London. and completed his Doctor of Philosophy (PhD) degree in 1990.

== Career ==
Sturgis worked at the National Gallery, London, from 1991 to 2005. Beginning in the education department, he later served as exhibitions and programmes curator from 1999 to 2005. In 2005, he was appointed Director of the Holburne Museum in Bath. During his time at Holburne, he oversaw a renovation of the museum that included a £13 million extension.

From the 2014/2015 academic year he was appointed Director of the University of Oxford's Ashmolean Museum on 1 October 2014. He is also a Supernumerary Fellow of Worcester College, Oxford.

His publications include Rebels and Martyrs: The Image of the Artist in the Nineteenth Century (2006) and Presence: Sculpture and the Portrait (2012).

== Personal life ==
In his spare time, Sturgis is a magician under the name The Great Xa and appeared on 1990s British TV programme The Word appearing to swallow sharp razor blades.

== Selected works ==
- Sturgis, Alexander (1994). Magic in art: tricks, perspective, illusions. London: Belitha Press. ISBN 978-1855613577.
- Sturgis, Alexander (1998). Faces. London: National Gallery Publications. ISBN 978-1857092226.
- Sturgis, Alexander (2000). Telling time. London: National Gallery Company. ISBN 978-1857099058.
- Sturgis, Alexander; Child, Lauren (2003). Dan's angel: a detective's guide to the language of painting. London: Frances Lincoln. ISBN 978-0711218857.
- Sturgis, Alexander; Christiansen, Rupert; Oliver, Lois; Wilson, Michael (2006). Rebels and martyrs: the image of the artist in the nineteenth century. London: National Gallery Company. ISBN 978-1857093469.
- Sturgis, Alexander (2009). Faces (2nd ed.). London: National Gallery Company. ISBN 978-1857094640.
- Sturgis, Alexander (2012). Presence: the art of portrait sculpture. Suffolk: Antique Collectors Club. ISBN 978-1851496853.
- Vestey, Joanna; Sturgis, Alexander; Roberts, Russell (2015). Custodians. Oxford: Ashmolean Museum Publications. ISBN 978-1854442970.

Cultural offices
Preceded by Christopher Brown	Director of the Ashmolean Museum; 2014–present	Incumbent
