= Vase of Flowers and Conch Shell =

1780 painting by Anne Vallayer-Coster

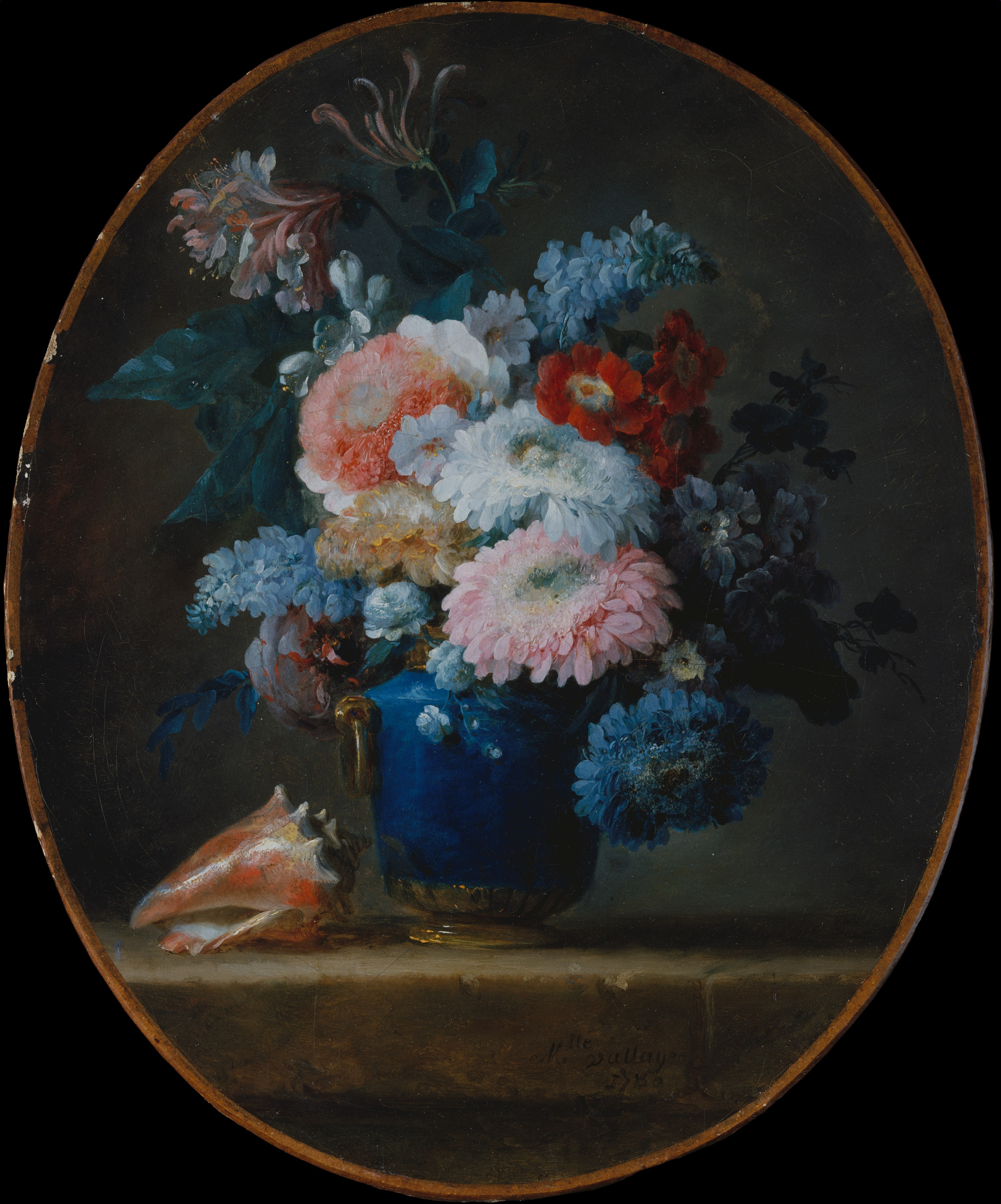
- Artist: Anne Vallayer-Coster
- Year: 1780
- Medium: oil paint, canvas
- Dimensions: 50.2 cm (19.8 in) × 38.1 cm (15.0 in)
- Location: Metropolitan Museum of Art
- Accession: 07.225.504
- Website: www.metmuseum.org/art/collection/search/437864

Vase of Flowers and Conch Shell is a painting by Anne Vallayer-Coster, from 1780. It is in the collection of the Metropolitan Museum of Art, in New York.

== Early history and creation ==
In 1770, Vallayer-Coster joined the French Academy. Marie Antoinette was her patron.

The painting was exhibited in the Salon of 1781. Vallayer had started to show her flower paintings at the Salon of 1775. Denis Diderot, who had been enthusiastic about her work in the Salon of 1771, gave a very different assessment in 1781 and writes of the small oval paintings of flowers and fruits that they lack the skill in drawing and brush that this type of painting requires.

The painting is executed in a mix of styles, with both very fine and broad brushstrokes. Eik Kahng, in an essay comparing Vallayer-Coster's technique to Chardin's notes that the level of detail in the flowers is "almost clinically precise", but the conch shell is painted with broad unblended brush strokes. Valerie Mainz, in an essay in the Dictionary of Women Artists, refers to the painting as an example of a proto-impressionist technique, resembling the use of pastel, that prefigures the flower paintings of Henri-Fantin-Latour.

== Later history and display ==
It was given to the Metropolitan Museum of Art, by J. Pierpont Morgan in 1906.
