= Jules Pellechet =

French architect

Jules Antoine François Auguste Pellechet (13 October 1829 - 18 September 1903) was a French architect, notable for his designs for buildings in France, Italy, and the United Kingdom and as an architect in the artillery technical section of France's Ministry of War.

== Life ==
Born in Paris to the architect Auguste Pellechet (1789-1871), he studied at the École polytechnique and the École des beaux-arts (class of 1850) in the studio of Abel Blouet. In 1869 he became a member of the société centrale des architectes français and in 1899 was made a Chevalier of the Légion d’honneur. He died in Paris. His daughter Marie began compilation of Catalogue général des incunables des bibliothèques publiques de France.

== Selected designs ==
=== Paris ===
- Hôtel de Sers, 41 avenue Pierre-Ier-de-Serbie.
- Hôtel d'Essling, 8 rue Jean-Goujon, 1866.
- Hôtel Menier, 4 avenue Ruysdaël, 1875.
- Extension to the hôtel Grimod de La Reynière, rue Boissy-d'Anglas, 1889.
- Hôtel de Barbentane, 30 quai de Billy (attributed)

=== Other ===
- Central artillery store, ministry of war
- Château du Plessis, Blanzy, 1872 (neo-Gothic modifications to the curtain walls, skylights, farmyard, unrealised design for the tour Magdeleine; all for the comte de Barbentane)
- Châtaigneraie de Retz, Chambourcy, around 1880.
- Bowes Museum, Barnard Castle, County Durham, United Kingdom, 1869-1871.
- Villa Huffer, Via Nazionale, Rome, Italy, 1880-1883 (base of the Bank of Italy).

== Works ==
- Jules Pellechet, Lettres d'Italie : 1856-1857, publiées par Marie et Catherine Pellechet, Paris, 1894, II+202 p
