= Anne Vallayer-Coster =

French artist (1744–1818)

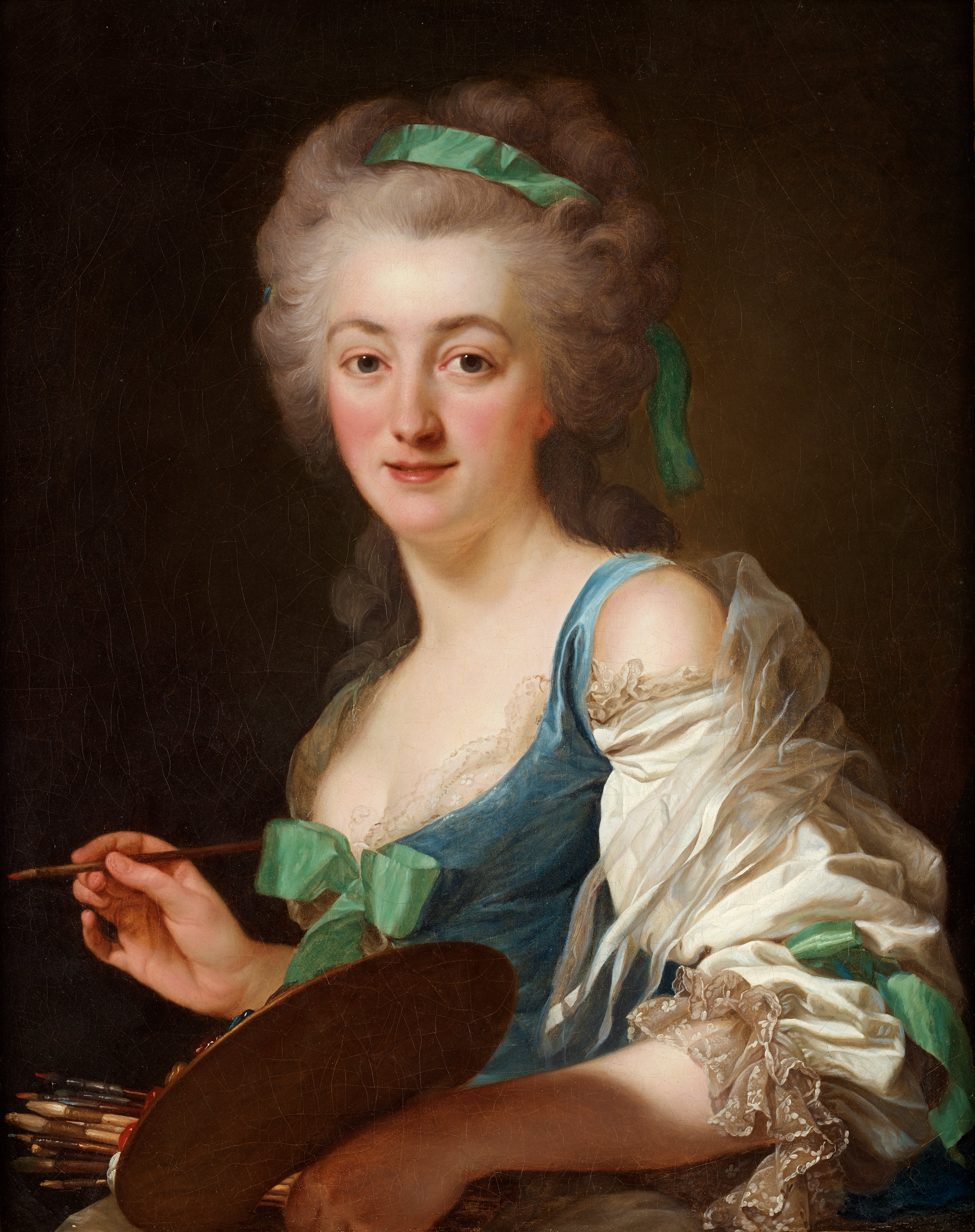
- Portrait of Anne Vallayer-Coster by Alexander Roslin (1783), Crocker Art Museum
- Born: 21 December 1744; Paris, Kingdom of France
- Died: 28 February 1818 (aged 73)
- Known for: Painting

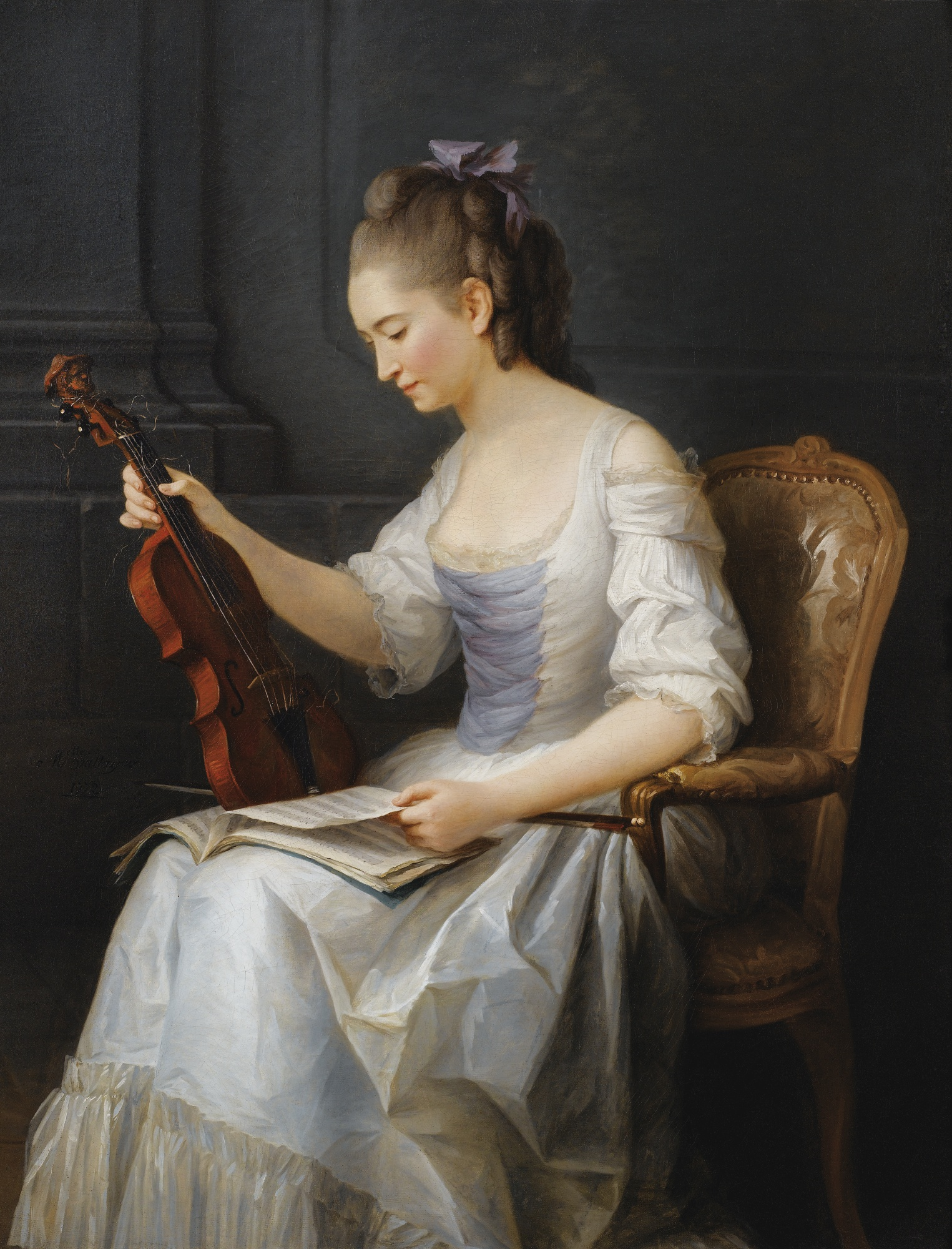
Anne Vallayer-Coster, Portrait of a Violinist, 1773

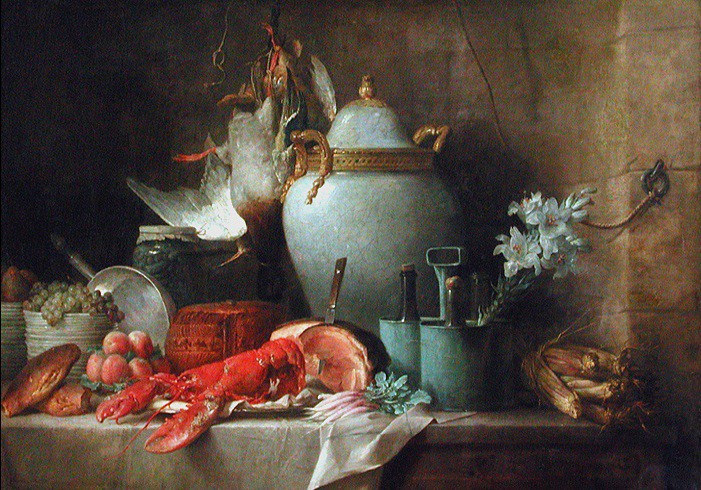
Anne Vallayer-Coster, Vase, Lobster, Fruits, and Game, 1817

Anne Vallayer-Coster (21 December 1744 – 28 February 1818) was a French painter best known for still lifes. She achieved fame and recognition very early in her career, being admitted to the Académie Royale de Peinture et de Sculpture in 1770, at the age of twenty-six.

Despite the low status that still life painting had at this time, Vallayer-Coster's highly developed skills, especially in the depiction of flowers, soon generated a great deal of attention from collectors and other artists. Her "precocious talent and the rave reviews" earned her the attention of the court, where Marie Antoinette took a particular interest in Vallayer-Coster's paintings.

Her life was determinedly private, dignified and hard-working. She survived the bloodshed of the Reign of Terror, but the fall of the French monarchy, who were her primary patrons, caused her reputation to decline.

In addition to still lifes, she painted portraits and genre paintings, but because of the restrictions placed on women at the time her success at figure painting was limited.

== Biography ==
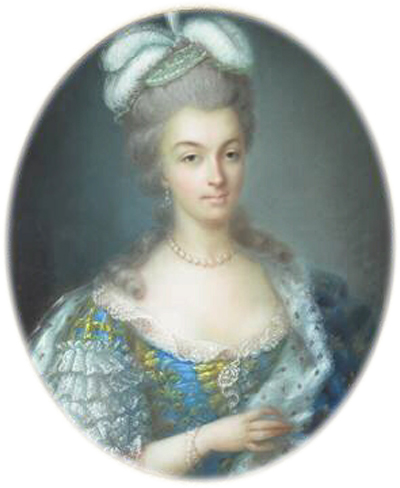
Queen Marie-Antoinette (1780)

=== Earlier years ===
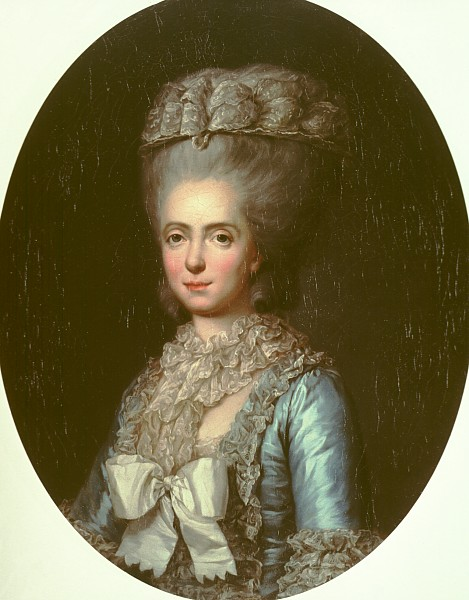
Portrait of Marie-Adelaide-Louisa de France

Born in 1744 on the banks of the Bièvre near the Seine, Vallayer-Coster was one of four daughters born to a goldsmith Joseph Vallayer (1704–1770) of the royal family et compagnon des Gobelins. One could assume that the artist's family tapestry business had some influence on her interest and skill in art. Many of her paintings were indeed copied into tapestries by the Manufacture Nationale des Gobelins. Since her childhood was spent in the factory, she had the opportunity to experience the entire operation of the business. In 1754, her father moved the family to Paris. Vallayer-Coster seems not to have entered the studio of a professional painter, possibly because such an apprenticeship to an unrelated male was difficult for a respectable woman. Like other women artists of the time, she was effectively trained by her father; but also learned from other sources including the botanical specialist Madeleine Basseport, and the celebrated marine painter Joseph Vernet.

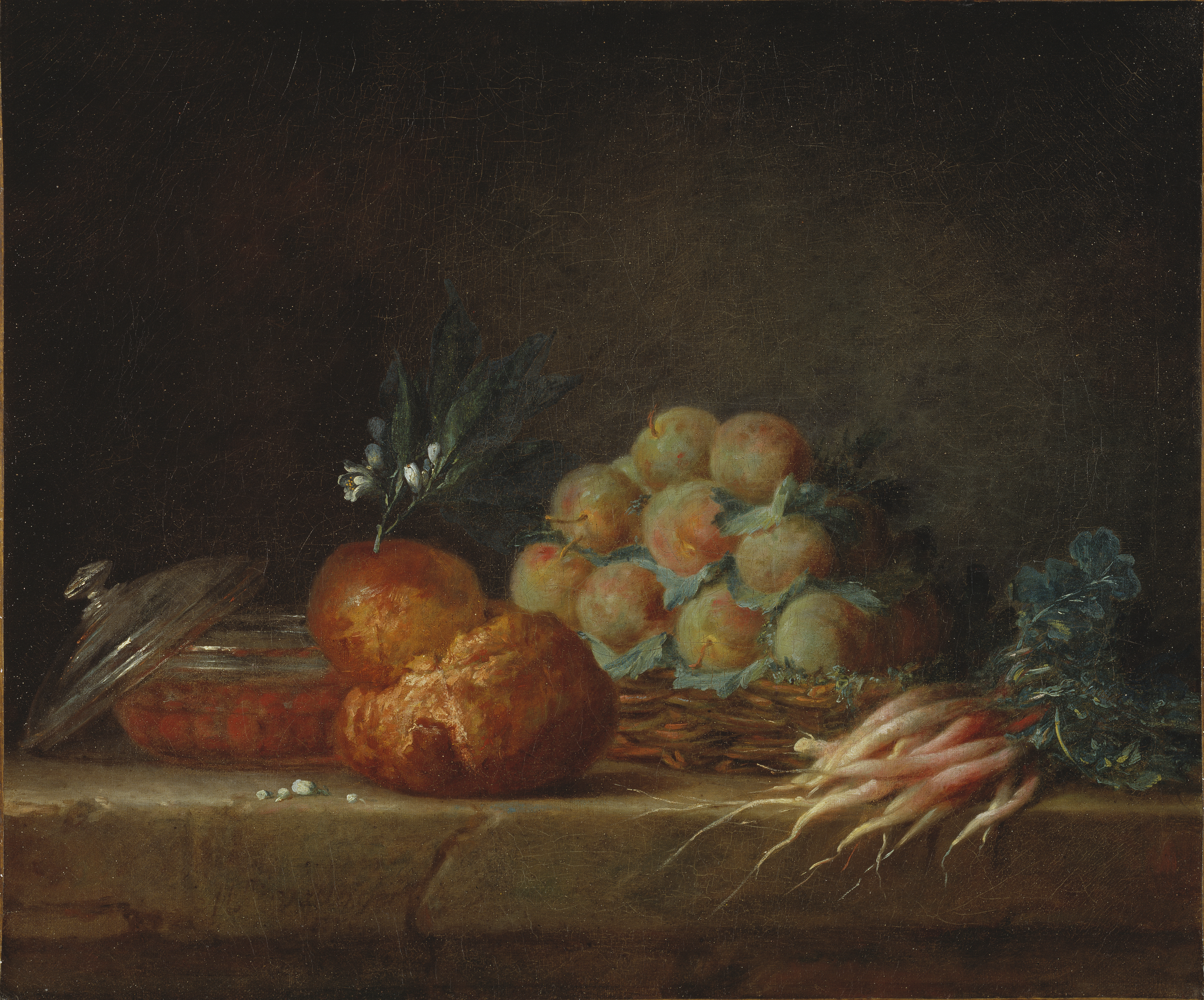
Anne Vallayer-Coster, Still Life with Brioche, Fruit and Vegetables, 1775

Anne Vallayer-Coster, Basket of Plums, 1769

=== Career beginnings ===
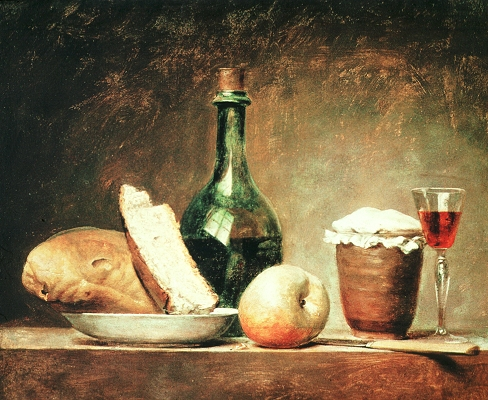
Still Life with Round Bottle

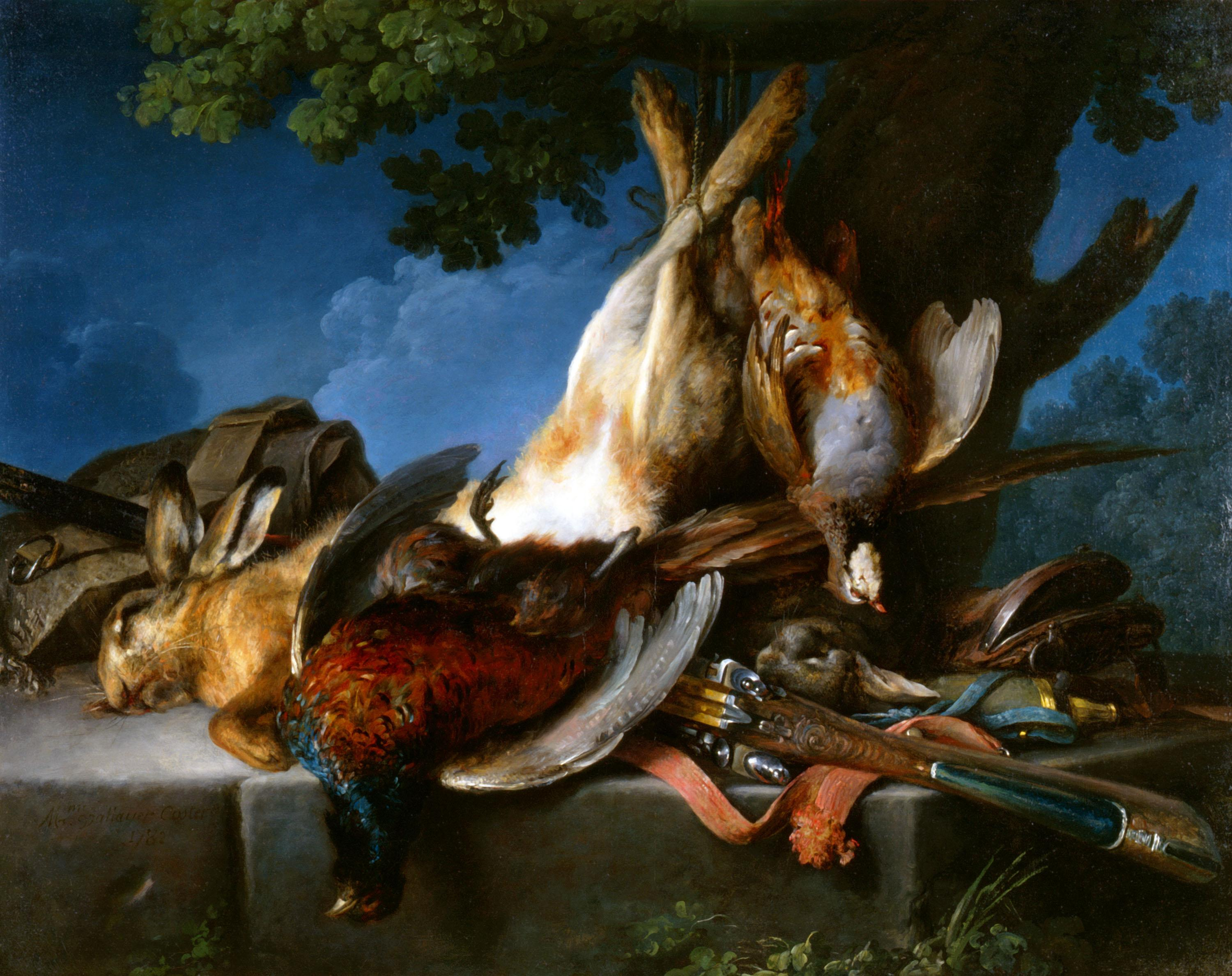
Anne Vallayer-Coster, Still Life with Game, 1782

By the age of twenty-six, Vallayer-Coster was still without a name or a sponsor; this proved to be a worrisome issue for her. Reluctantly, she submitted two of her still lifes—The Attributes of Painting and The Attributes of Music (both now in the holdings of the Louvre)—to the Académie Royale de Peinture et de Sculpture, as reception pieces in 1770. She was unanimously elected into the Royal Académie once the Academicians saw her paintings, making her one of only fourteen women accepted into the Académie before the French Revolution. This moment of success, however, was overshadowed by the death of her father. Immediately her mother took over the family business, quite commonly the case during this time, and Anne continued to work to help support her family.

Along with her Attributes of Painting, Sculpture, and Architecture and Attributes of Music paintings, nine more of Vallayer-Coster's paintings, some of which had previously been submitted to the academicians, were displayed in the Salon exhibit of 1771. Commenting on the Salon exhibit of 1771, the encyclopedist Denis Diderot noted that "if all new members of the Royal Academy made a showing like Mademoiselle Vallayer's, and sustained the same high level of quality, the Salon would look very different!" Though she is known for still life paintings in this period, her portraiture grew in popularity, and her 1773 Portrait of a Violinist was purchased by the National Museum in 2015.

Vallayer-Coster exhibited her first floral still life in 1775, and subsequently became known especially as a painter of flowers. Four years later, she began to enjoy the patronage of Marie Antoinette. With her Court connections and pressure from Marie Antoinette, she received space in the Louvre in 1781 which was unusual for women artists. Shortly thereafter, in the presence of Marie Antoinette at the courts of Versailles, she married Jean-Pierre Silvestre Coster (1745–1824), a wealthy lawyer, parlementaire, and respected member of a powerful family from Lorraine. Marie Antoinette signed the marriage contract as witness. With these titles came the very highest ranks of the bourgeoisies, the noblesse de robe. With such a prestigious title came a state office which, traditionally during this time was bought from father to son, making them almost indistinguishable from the old nobility.

=== Career Recognition ===
She received early recognition of her career after being elected as an associate and a full member of the Royal Académie in 1770. Her strategies in initiating and sustaining her professional career were brilliant. She was exceptional in achieving membership in the academy and succeeding in a prominent, professional career late in the 18th century, when resistance to women in the public sphere was deepening and the Académie was as resistant as ever to welcoming women into its ranks. A common image of Vallayer-Coster was not only as a virtuous artist but as a skilful diplomat and negotiator, sharply aware both of her potential patrons' interests and of her own unusual position as a prominent woman artist.

=== Later years ===
With the Reign of Terror in 1793, the ancient regime, which up to this point had supported Vallayer-Coster, disappeared. Despite her noble status and her connection to the throne, Vallayer-Coster was able to avoid the pandemonium of the French Revolution in 1789, but the fall of the French monarchy affected her career. There is evidence that during this period of decline in Vallayer-Coster's career, she worked for the Gobelins Tapestry factory as a means to continue her artistic endeavors. Although during Napoléon's reign, the empress Josephine acquired two works from her in 1804, her reputation was diminished. Vallayer-Coster concentrated on floral paintings in oil, watercolor and gouache.

In 1817 she exhibited Still Life with Lobster in the Paris Salon. In this, her last exhibited painting, she managed what an expert called "a summation of her career" depicting most of her previous subjects together in a work she donated to the restored King Louis XVIII. There is some evidence that Vallayer-Coster gave it to the king as an expression of her joy as a loyal Bourbon supporter through the turbulent years of the Revolution and Napoleonic imperialism.

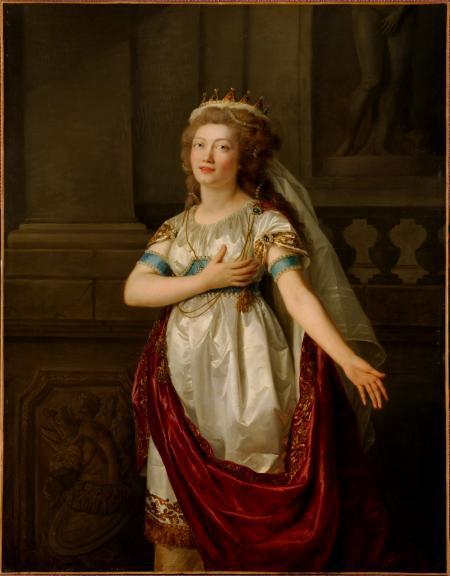
Anne Vallayer-Coster, Madame de Saint-Huberty in the Role of Dido, 1785

She died in 1818 at the age of seventy-three having painted more than 120 still lifes, always with a distinctive colouristic brilliance.

== Artwork ==
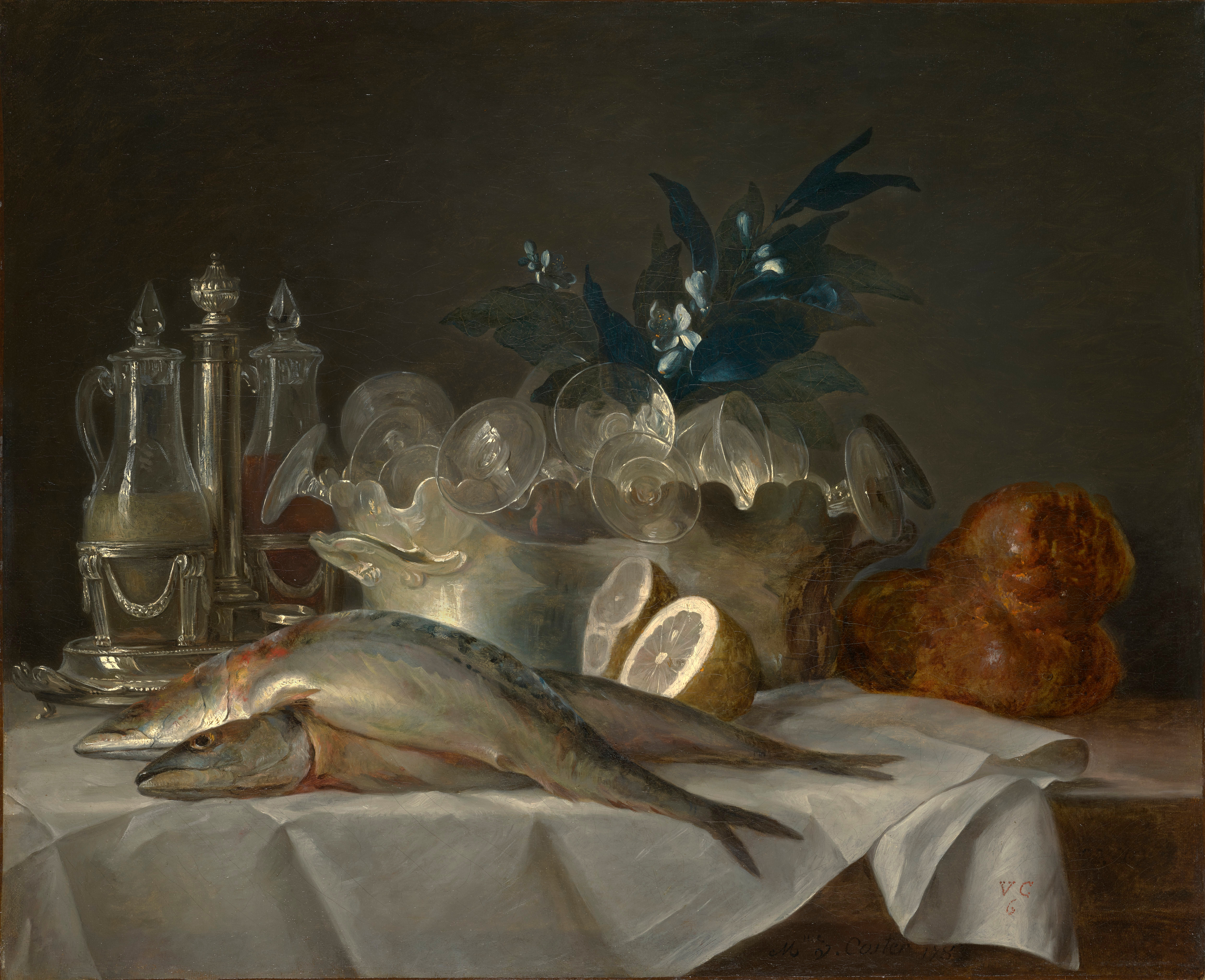
Still Life with Mackerel, 1787

=== Style and technique ===
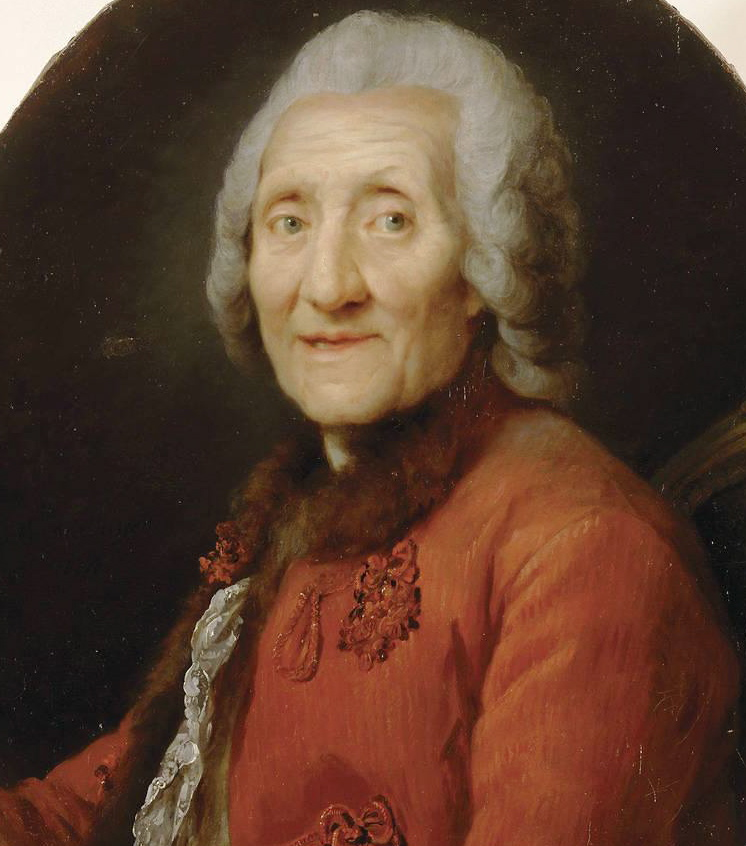
Anne Vallayer-Coster, Joseph-Charles Roettiers, 1777

Vallayer-Coster worked principally in the varieties of still life developed over the course of the 17th and 18th centuries. Conventional morality precluded women artists from drawing from the nude model, which was the necessary foundation for the higher genres. Still life, considered the least intellectual of the genres and the lowest in the academic hierarchy, was therefore deemed the appropriate subject for female artists. While accepting this limitation in order to gain admission to the academy, the main conduit of royal patronage, Vallayer-Coster devoted her formidable technical abilities to the still life, creating works of undeniable seriousness and real visual interest.

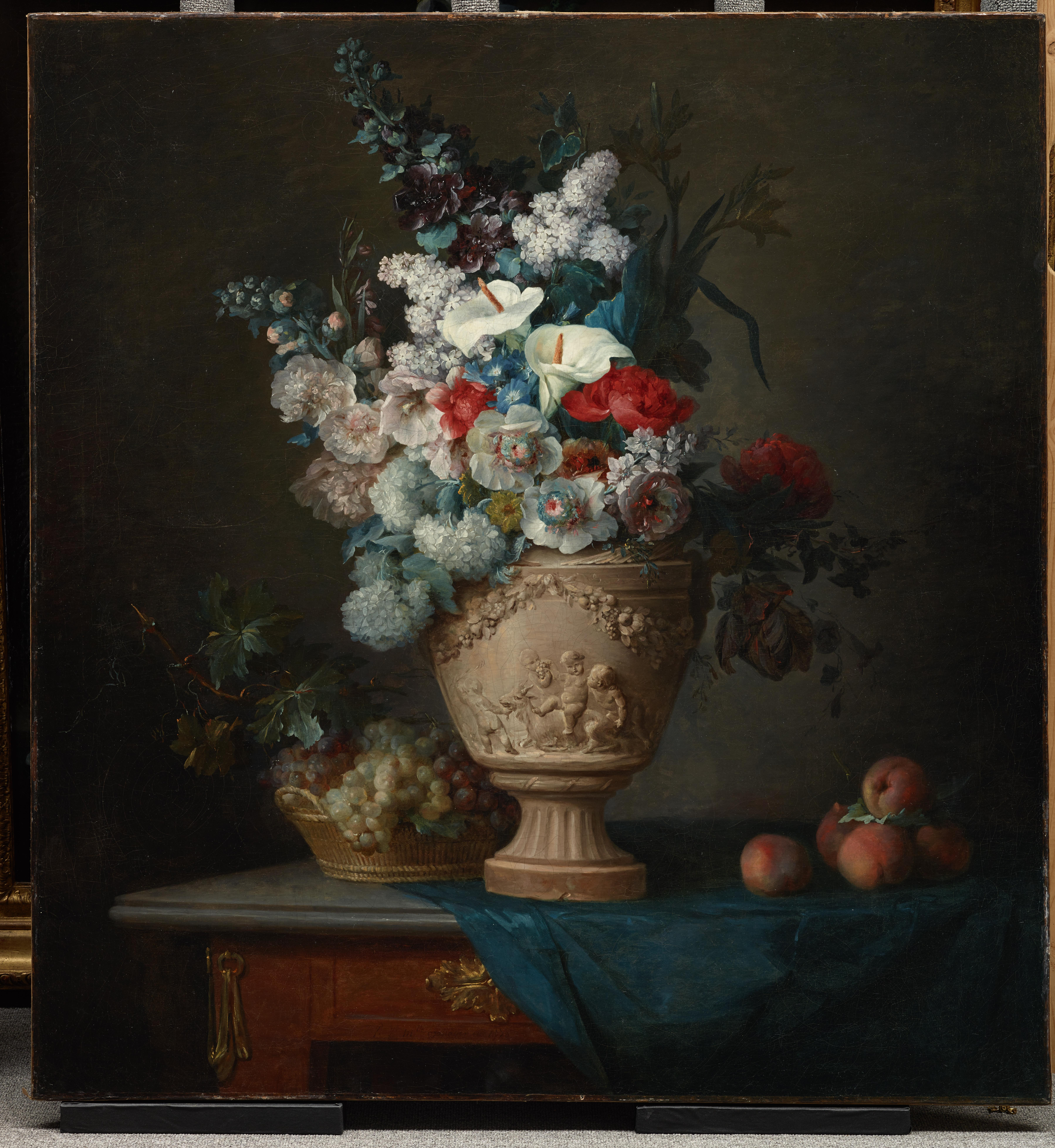
Anne Vallayer-Coster, Bouquet of Flowers in a Terracotta Vase with Peaches and Grapes, 1776

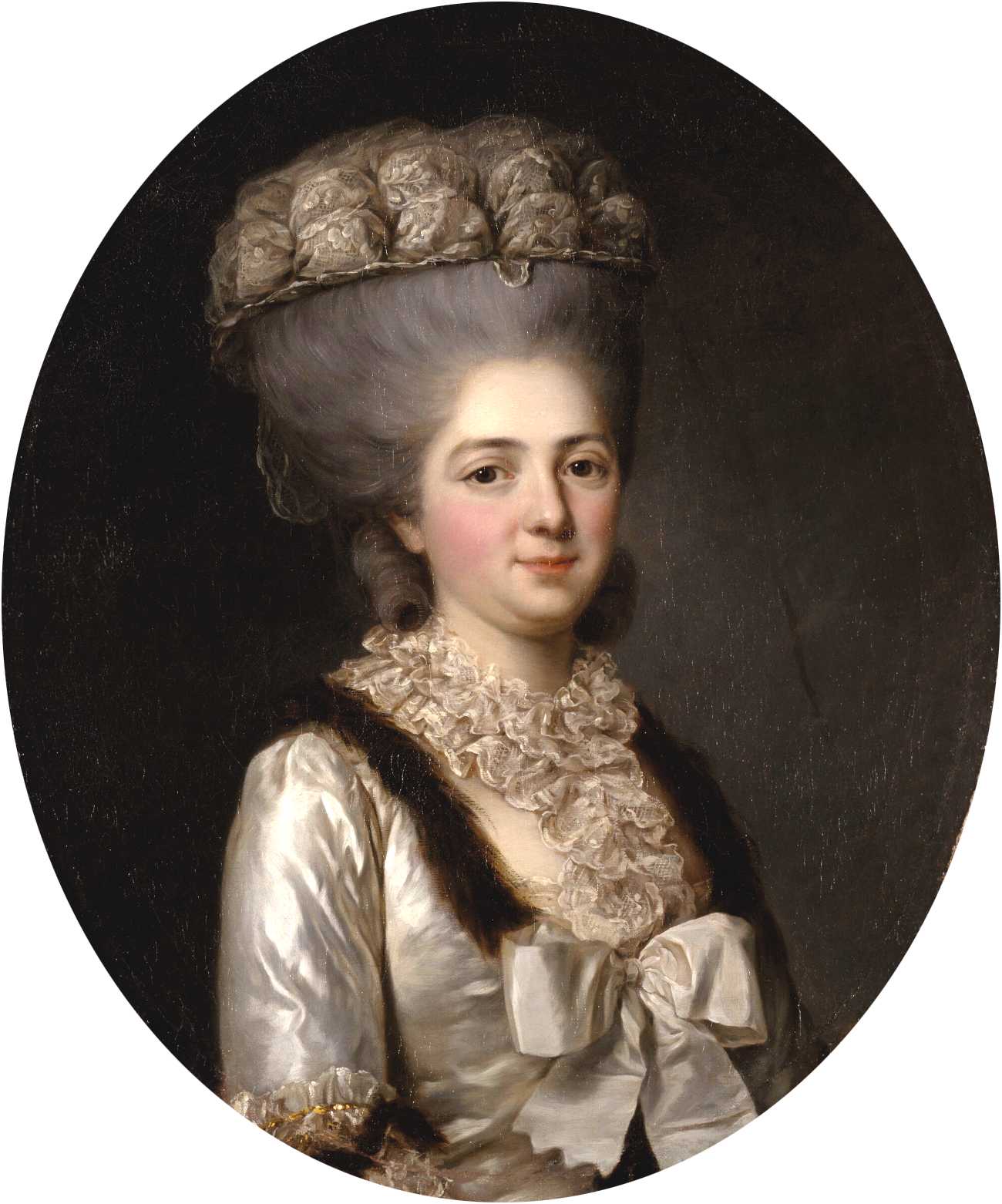
Anne Vallayer-Coster, Victorie of France, 1779-1781

Vallayer-Coster used oil on canvas for most of her paintings. She achieved a great verisimilitude in the representation of materials and textures by the use of precise, finely blended brush strokes. According to the art historian Marianne Roland Michel, it was the "bold, decorative lines of her compositions, the richness of her colors and simulated textures, and the feats of illusionism she achieved in depicting wide variety of objects, both natural and artificial" that drew the attention of the Royal Académie and the numerous collectors who purchased her paintings. This interaction between art and nature was quite common in Dutch, Flemish, and French still lifes. Her work reveals the clear influence of Jean-Baptiste-Siméon Chardin, as well as 17th-century Dutch masters, whose work has been far more highly valued, but what made Vallayer-Coster's style stand out against the other still life painters was her unique way of coalescing representational illusionism with decorative compositional structures. Her objective was to give an aspect of grandeur to everything that she painted; in doing so, she created an additional sense of stability and plenitude. The critic John Haber, who describes her work as lacking inwardness, says that the solidity and reassuring materiality of her compositions appealed to elite bankers and aristocrats, who could appreciate her rendering of "contrasting veneers of different woods" or "an extravagant collection of coral and shells, things that took years to come into being and will last for decades to come."

== Exhibition ==
In 2002-2003 more than thirty-five of Vallayer-Coster's paintings, which were provided by both museums and private collectors of France and the United States, were exhibited at the National Gallery of Art, The Frick Collection, and the Musee des Beaux-Arts de Nancy. The exhibition, "Anne Vallayer-Coster: Painter to the Court of Marie Antoinette," was the first exhibition to provide a proper, all-encompassing representation of her paintings. It was organized by the Dallas Museum of Art and curated by Eik Kahng. The exhibition included additional works by Chardin, her elder and the celebrated master of still life painting, and her contemporary Henri-Horace Roland Delaporte, among others. In June 2015, the Nationalmuseum added Vallayer-Coster's 1773 Portrait of a Violinist to its collection of 18th-century French painting. The Nationalmuseum is also in possession of Vallayer-Coster's 1775 Still Life with Brioche, Fruit, and Vegetables and her undated miniature Floral Still Life. In March 2019, the Kimbell Art Museum acquired Vallayer-Coster's 1787 painting titled Still Life with Mackerel.

== Works by Anne Vallayer-Coster ==
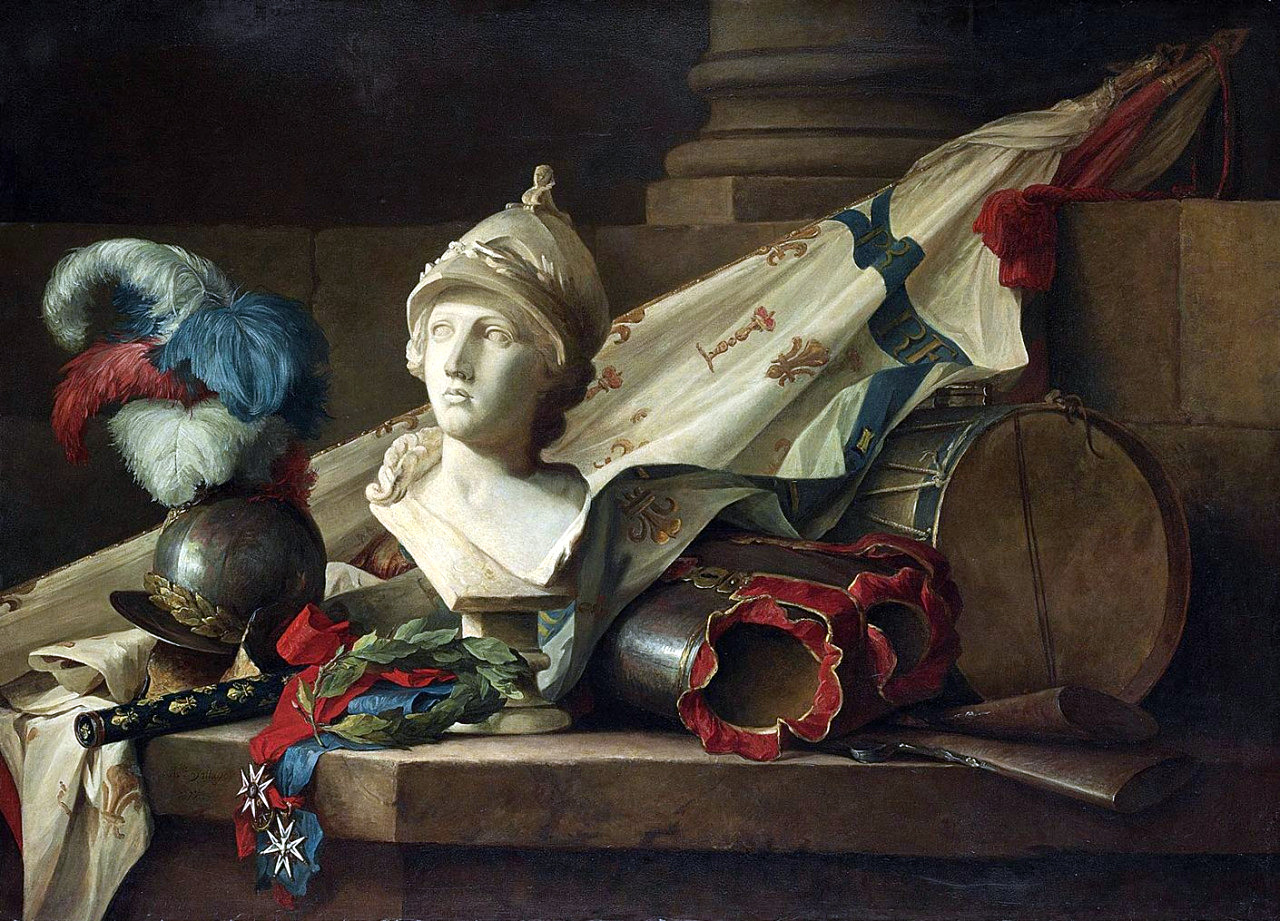
A Bust of Minerva with Armour and Weapons on a Stone Ledge (1777)

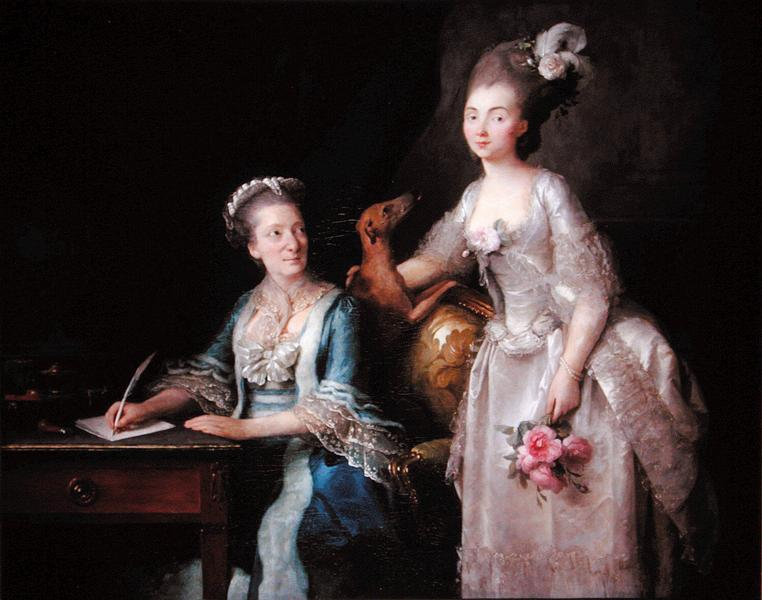
A Lady Writing, and her Daughter (1775)

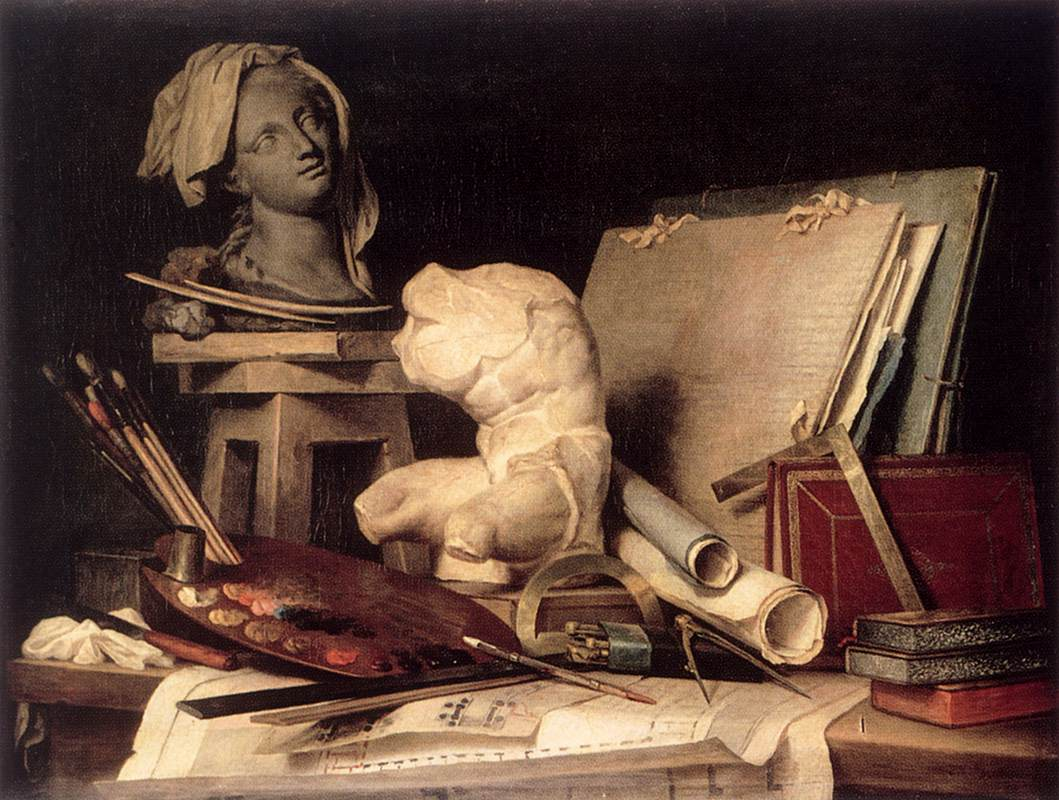
Attributes of Painting, Sculpture, and Architecture (1769)

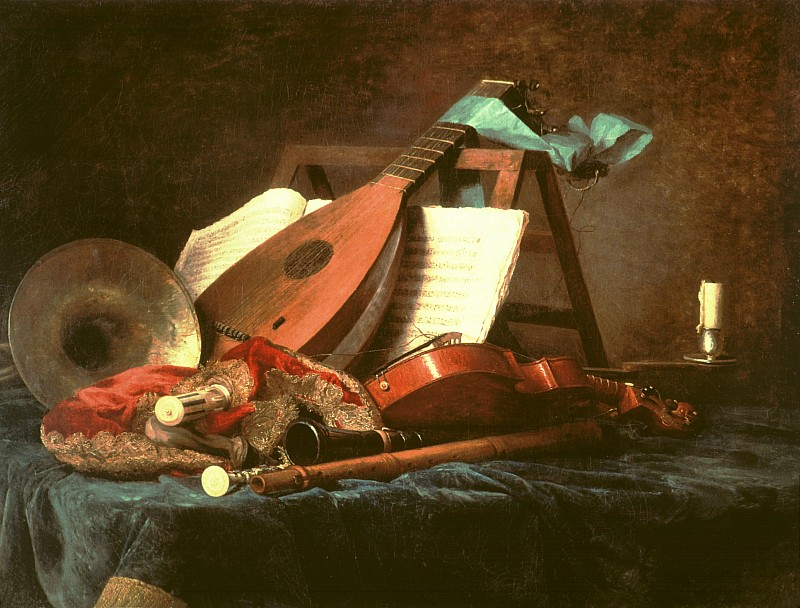
Attributes of Music (1770)

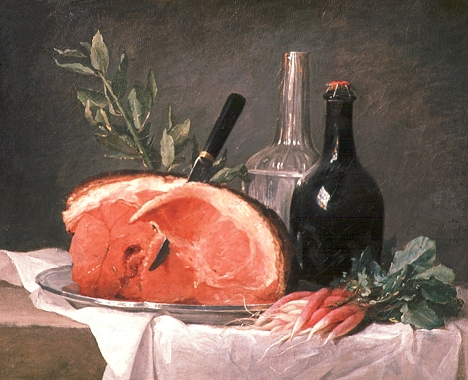
Still Life with a Ham (ca. 1767)

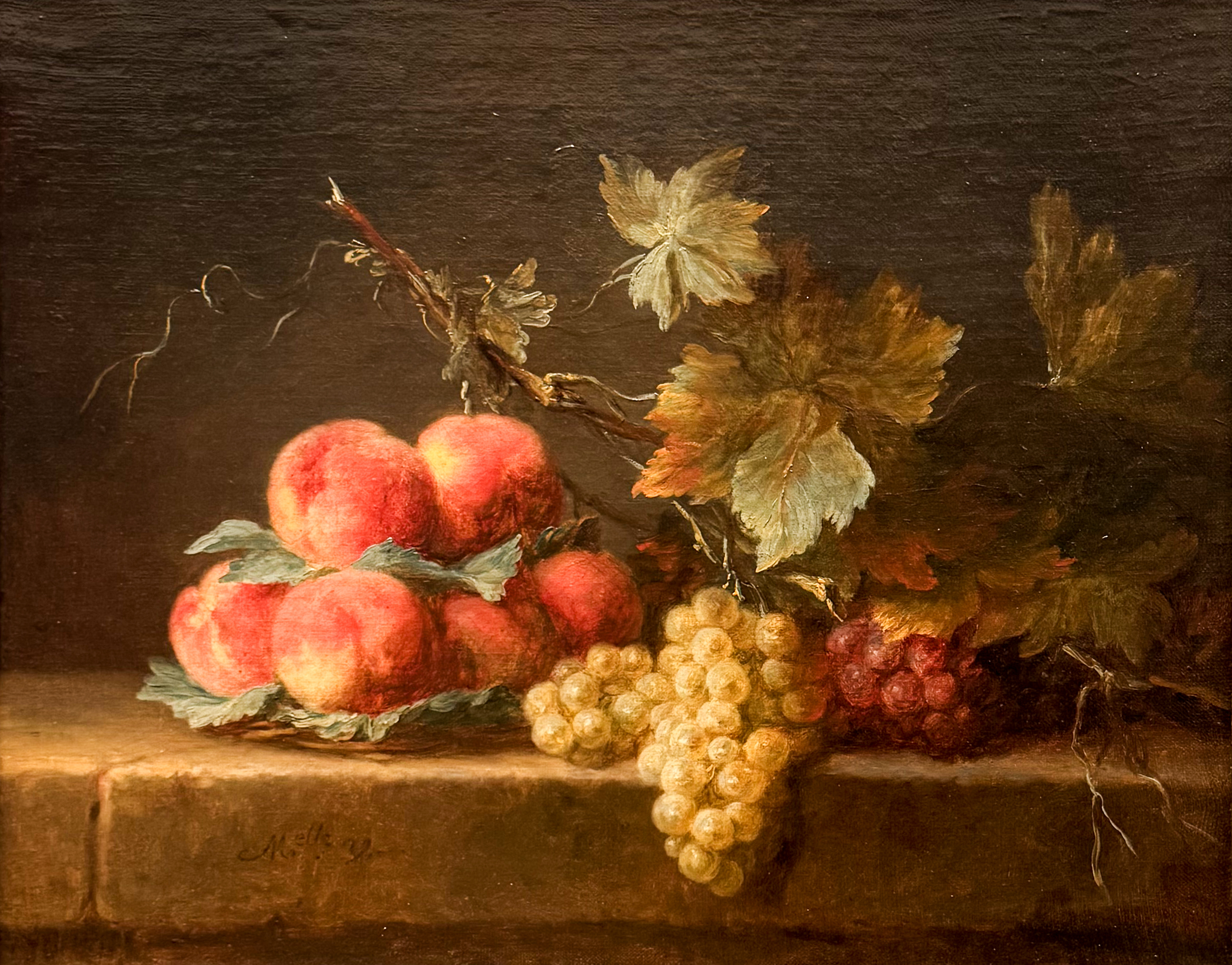
Still Life with Peaches and Grapes

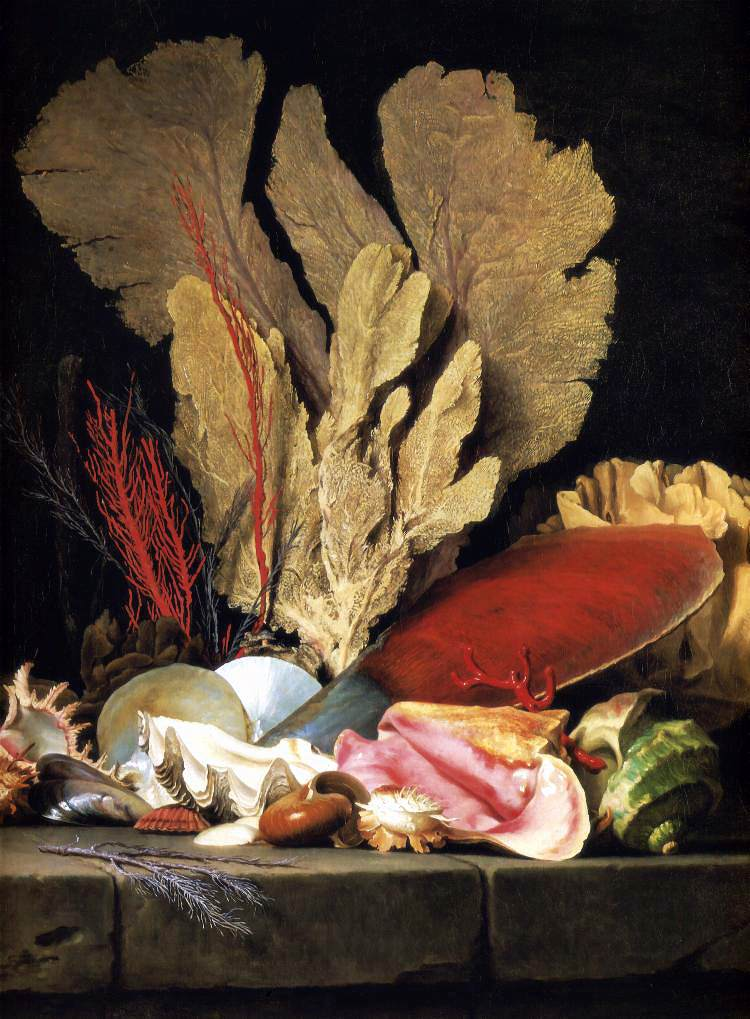
Still-Life with Tuft of Marine Plants, Shells and Corals (1769)

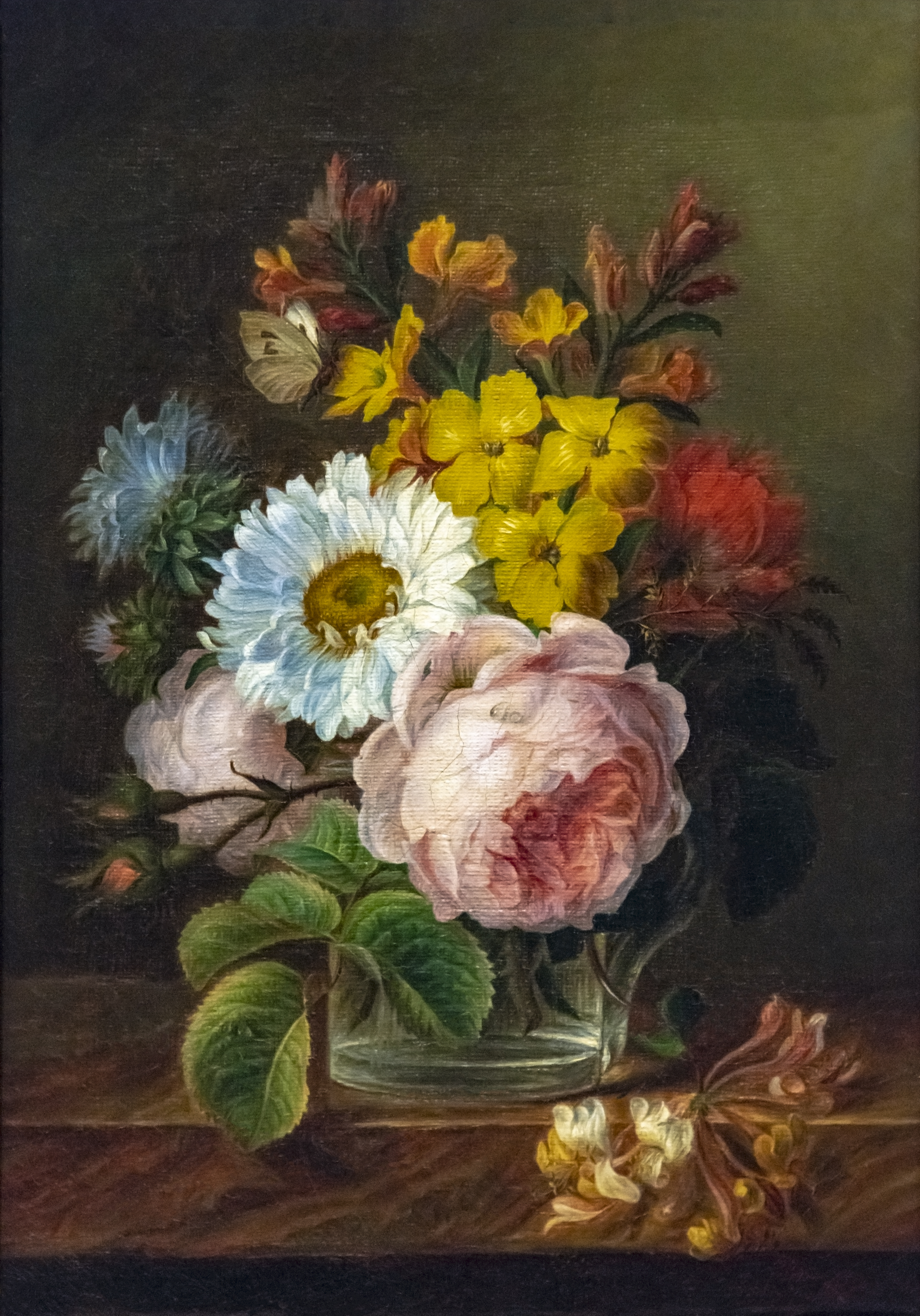
Bouquet of flowers in a glass of water (ca. 1774)

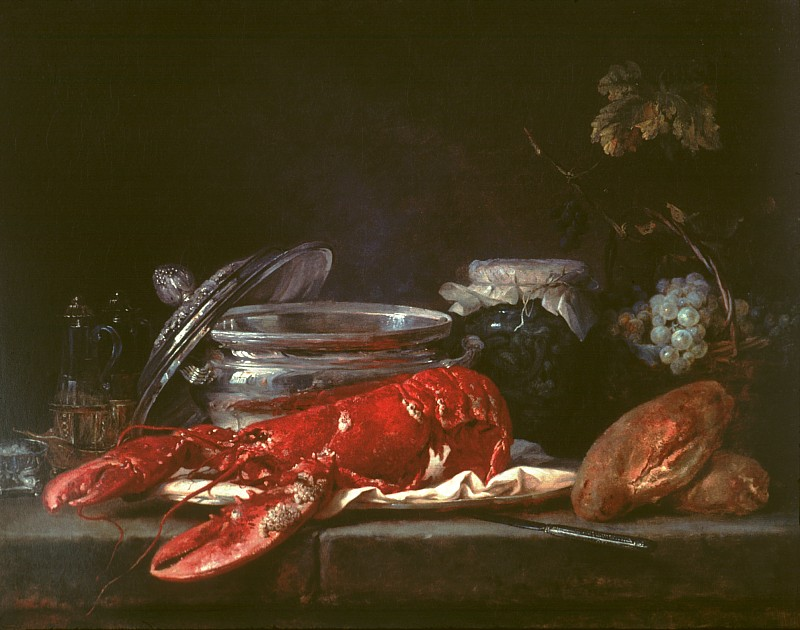
Still Life with Lobster (ca. 1781)

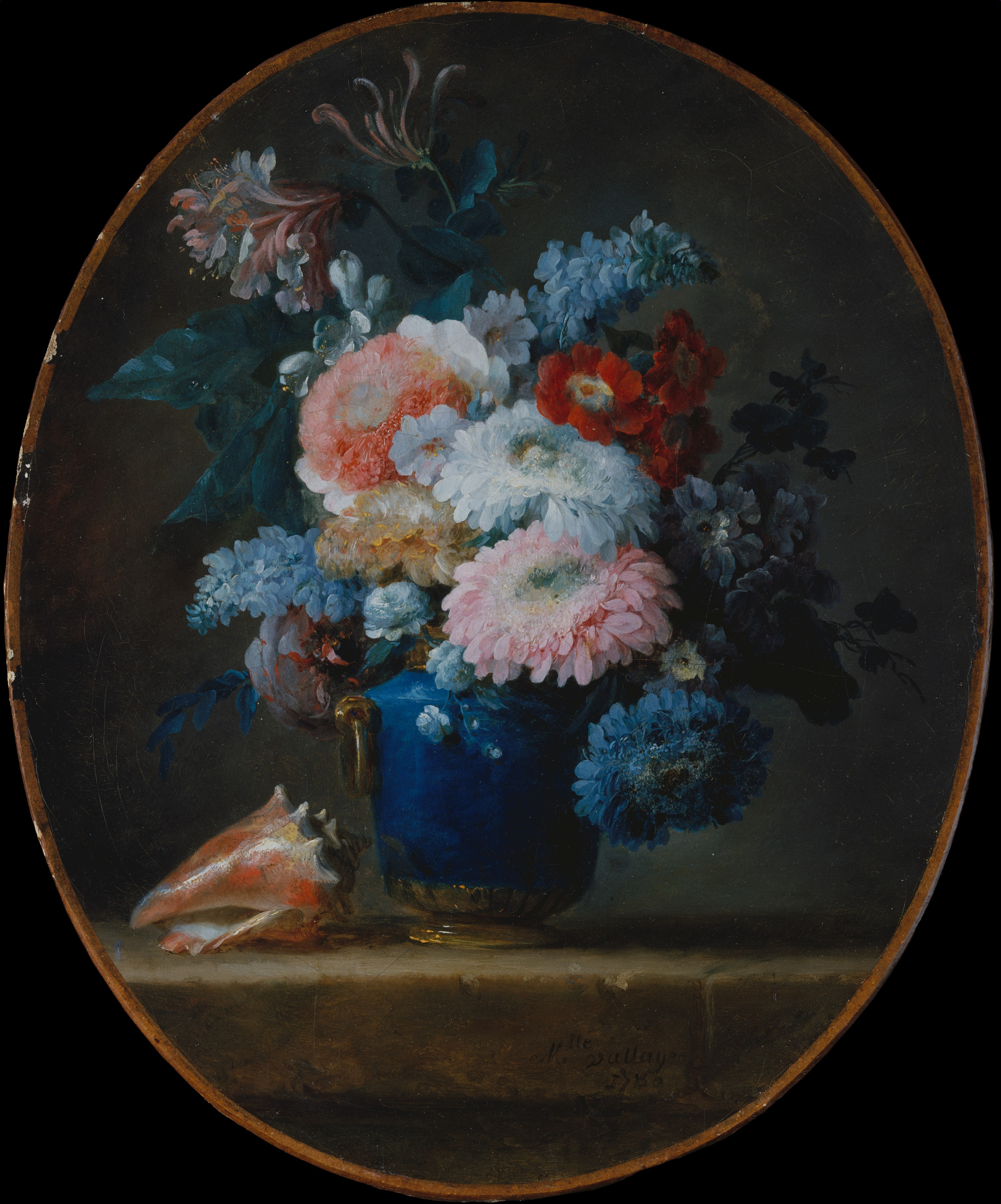
Vase of Flowers and Conch Shell (1780)

== See also ==
- Women artists
