= Errol Francis =

Errol Anthony Francis (born in Oracabessa, Jamaica, 1956) is an artist, former mental health campaigner, and current charity executive in the United Kingdom. He currently lives and works in London, England.

== Biography ==
Errol Francis gained his MA Fine Art from Central St Martins College of Art and Design in 2004. His professional practice ranged from being a mental health carer, a mental health writer, consultant and campaigner, to running mental health charities and being a senior manager in the NHS.

He has co-authored of a number of inquiry reports and book chapters, including Black People, Mental Health and the Criminal Justice System with Deryck Browne and Epidemiology, ethnicity and schizophrenia with S. P. Sashidharan. Francis was part of the independent public inquiry into a number of deaths of African-Caribbean patients at Broadmoor Hospital and was co-author of the 1993 Big, Black and Dangerous report into deaths of African-Caribbean patients at Broadmoor Hospital. Francis was formerly Joint Programme Lead at the Sainsbury Centre for Mental Health and was co-author of Breaking the Circles of Fear, a research report into the relationship of the African-Caribbean community with the psychiatric services. The project aimed to promote inclusion and positive mental health for black mental health service users, advising the Department of Health on their Delivering Race Equality programme.

As an artist, Francis has exhibited across the UK. His installation about voting processes was exhibited at the Nehru Centre London, and his photos and videos have been seen at a series of exhibitions at the Stephen Lawrence Gallery in Greenwich, at the BFI Southbank and the Camberwell Arts Festival. He was one of the artists chosen in 2007 to respond to the Bicentenary of the Parliamentary Abolition of the Slave Trade, to which he responded by encapsulating a lump of demerara sugar in acrylic. His collaborations with former asylum patients were shown in London, Birmingham, Penryth and Glasgow in 2007 as part of the Mental Health Media project Testimony. He has collaborated with artist Caspar Below as Black Park, in 2005 when they launched their online project as part of the A2 Arts Ephemeral Cities project for Deptford.

There are numerous references in Francis’s work to post-colonial visuality as it is manifested in architecture, landscape, museums and plant collecting. This critical questioning of empire and difference and its meaning for contemporary Britain have repeatedly led him to Greenwich, a place he has identified as historically crucial and representative for the British national identity, which he explored in his (2009) Space time and Englishness. His doctoral thesis is about the institutional, spatial and historical relationships between museums, gardens and hospitals.

Errol was appointed CEO of Culture& in 2016, in which capacity he remains. In addition, he was awarded his PhD from the Slade School of Fine Art, University College London, where his research focused on postcolonial artistic responses to museums. He was awarded an Honorary Doctorate of Letters from the University of West London in 2017.
