= Henri-Horace Roland Delaporte =

French painter

Henri-Horace Roland Delaporte (or De La Porte) (c.1724 – 23 November 1793) was a French still life painter.

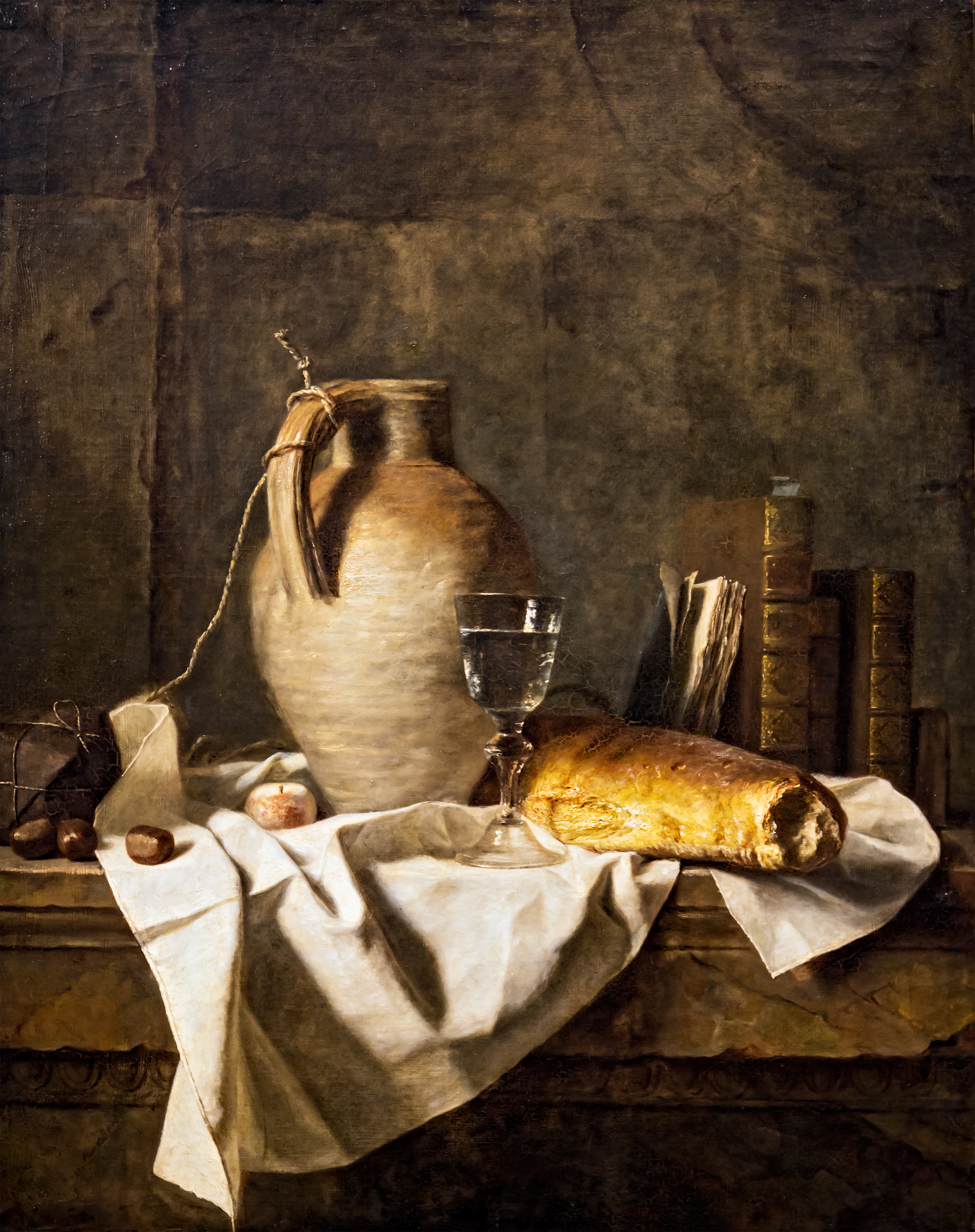
Preparations for a rustic lunch Louvre Museum, Paris

Born in Paris, he was a pupil of Jean-Baptiste Oudry. In 1763 he was accepted by the Royal Academy of Painting and Sculpture in Paris as a painter of flowers and animals. His "reception piece" was Vase of Lapis, Sphere and Musical Instruments.

His speciality was still life paintings of animals and fruits and trompe-l’œil. He also painted many still lifes of musical instruments, and exhibited frequently at the Paris Salon from 1761 to 1789. The similarity of his style to that of Jean Siméon Chardin meant that several of Delaporte's works were at one time attributed to the latter.

He died in Paris in 1793.

== Selected works ==
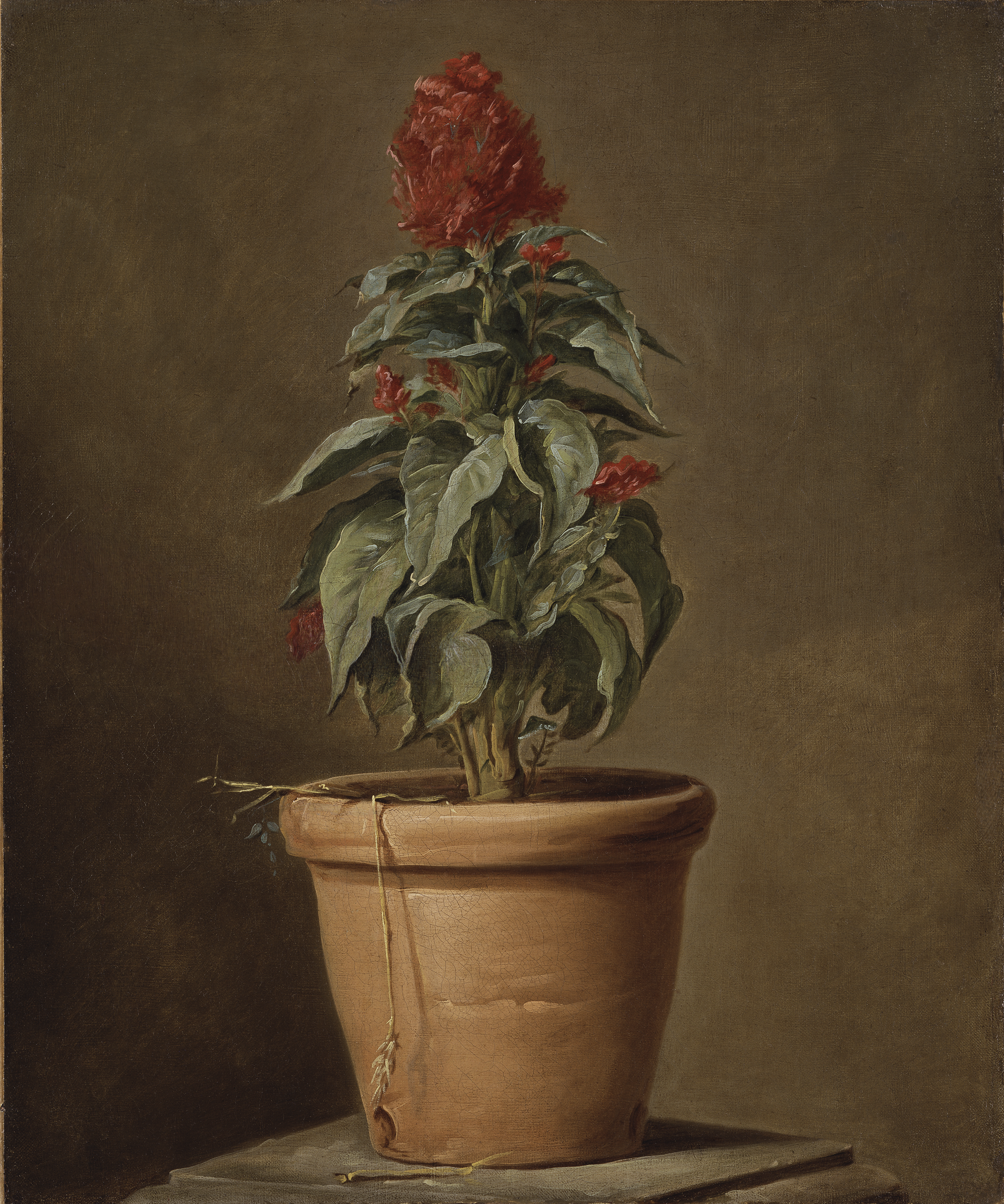
A Potted Plant

- Nature morte à la vielle, c.1760, oil on canvas, 80 × 101 cm, Musée des beaux-arts de Bordeaux
- Vase de lapis orné de bronze et musette à soufflet, 1763, 102 × 82 cm, Louvre Museum, Paris
- Nature morte aux instruments de musique (Still Life with Musical Instruments), 1765, oil on canvas, 129 × 87 cm, Musée du Château de Blois
- Apprêts d’un déjeuner rustique, Louvre Museum, Paris
- La Petite Collation or Nature morte a la carafe d’orgeat (Still Life with Carafe of Barley Wine), 1787, 37 × 46 cm, Louvre Museum, Paris
- Le Panier d’œufs (Basket of Eggs), 1788, 38 × 48 cm, Louvre Museum, Paris
- Nature morte au potiron et aux champignons (Still life with Pumpkin and Mushrooms), musée des beaux-arts, Rouen
- L'Oranger, Staatliche Kunsthalle Karlsruhe
