= Clare Lilley =

British art curator

- Education: University of Manchester (History of Art)
- Occupations: Art curator; museum director
- Employer: Yorkshire Sculpture Park (–2025-07)
- Known for: Director of Yorkshire Sculpture Park; Curator of Frieze Sculpture (2012–2022)
- Board member of: George Rickey Foundation; Jupiter Artland Foundation

Clare Lilley is a British art curator and most recently, director at Yorkshire Sculpture Park (YSP), where previously she held the post of director of programme. In July 2025 she left the role at YSP.

== Biography ==
Lilley grew up in Merseyside, near Crosby Beach, where Antony Gormley's Another Place installation is now located. Coming from a family of engineers and scientists, she developed an early interest in art and frequently visited the Walker Art Gallery in Liverpool during her teenage years.

Lilley graduated with a degree in the history of art from the University of Manchester. She began her career at the Yorkshire Sculpture Park in 1992, when the estate comprised approximately 15 acres. Under her tenure, the park expanded to 500 acres, hosting around 1,000 sculptures at any given time.

From 2012 to 2022 she curated Frieze Sculpture in London's Regents Park and she has curated William Turnbull for Chatsworth House, Derbyshire and Jaume Plensa at San Giorgio Maggiore as Venice Biennale collateral event.

Lilley is on the board of the George Rickey Foundation, New York, and the Jupiter Artland Foundation, Edinburgh. She is the author of Vitamin C: Clay and Ceramic in Contemporary Art, published by Phaidon Press.

Lilley has three times been cited on the Artylst Alt Power List.

In 2022, Lilley succeeded Peter Murray as Director of Programme at the Yorkshire Sculpture Park.
