= Christopher Brown (museum director) =

British art historian and academic

Professor Christopher Brown CBE
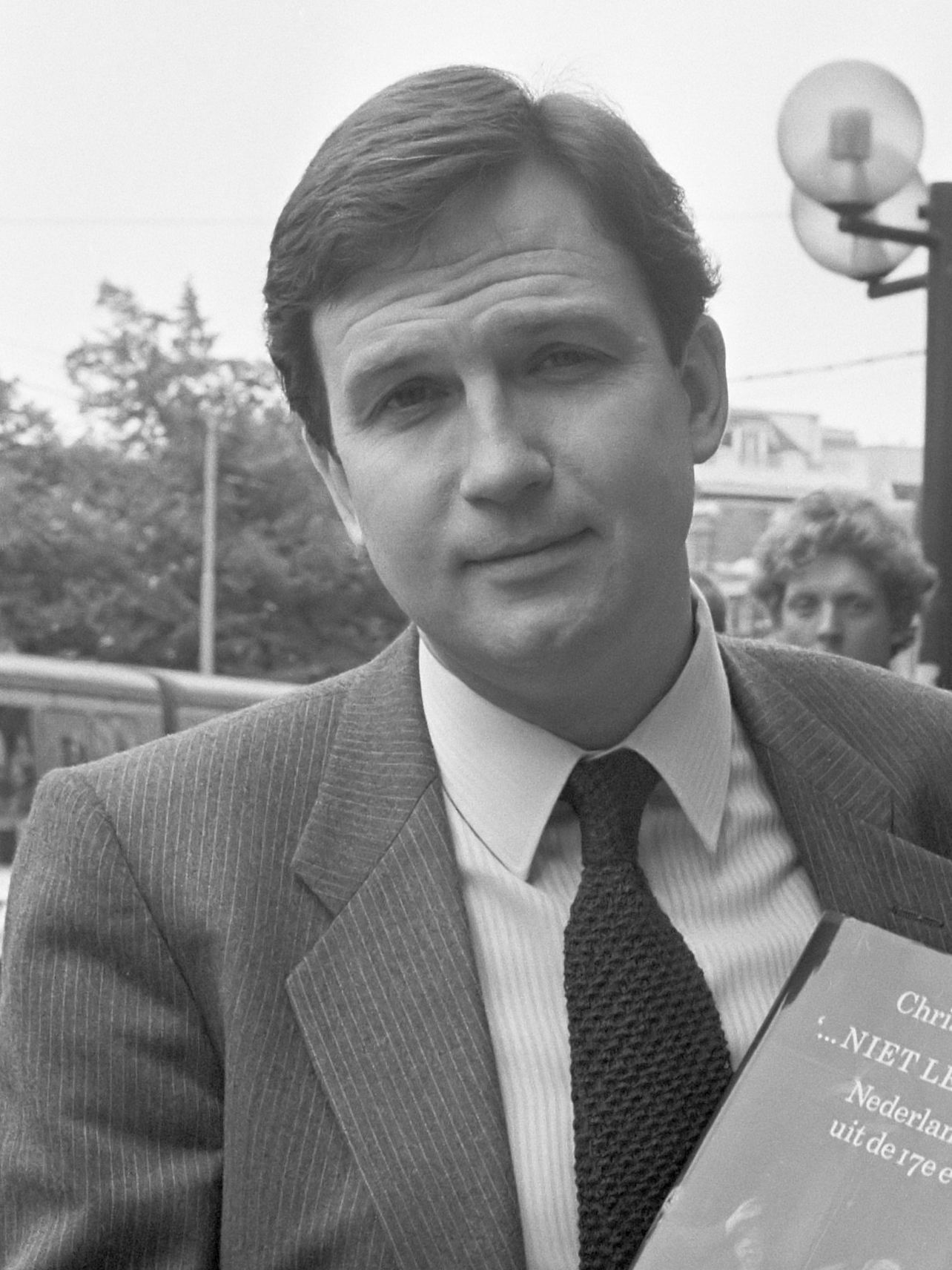
- Christopher Brown (1984)
- Born: Christopher Paul Hadley Brown; 15 April 1948 (age 77); Tangier International Zone (now Tangier, Morocco)
- Occupation: Museum director
- Employer: University of Oxford

Christopher Paul Hadley Brown, CBE (born 15 April 1948) is a British art historian and academic. He was director of the Ashmolean Museum in Oxford, England from 1998 to 2014. He is recognised as an authority on Sir Anthony van Dyck.

== Early life ==
Brown was born on 15 April 1948, in Tangier, Morocco. His father flew Spitfires during World War II and joined civil aviation in the post war period, flying for Gibraltar Airways and British European Airways. He was educated at Merchant Taylors' School, an all-boys public school in Hertfordshire. He then matriculated into St Catherine's College, Oxford to study history. In 1966, he graduated from the University of Oxford with a Bachelor of Arts (BA) degree in Modern History. This was later promoted to Master of Arts (MA Oxon) as per tradition. He remained at St Catherine's to complete a Diploma in Art History. He then undertook post-graduate research at the Courtauld Institute of Art and completed his Doctor of Philosophy (PhD) degree.

== Career ==
From 1971 to 1998, he worked at the National Gallery, London; first as Curator of 17th-century Dutch and Flemish paintings, eventually as Chief Curator. He was appointed director of the Ashmolean Museum in Oxford in 1998 and it was largely due to him that the museum, especially the front part, was rebuilt.

Brown sits on the Prix Pictet advisory board.

== Honours ==
In the 2011 New Year Honours, Brown was appointed commander of the Order of the British Empire (CBE) 'for services to museums'.

He is an honorary fellow of his alma mater St Catherine's College, Oxford.

== Bibliography ==
Brown's works include:

- —— (1972). Dutch Townscape Painting (Themes and painters in the National Gallery). National Gallery. ISBN 090179144X.
- —— (1975). Bruegel. Phaidon. ISBN 0714816639.
- —— (1976). Dutch Painting. Phaidon. ISBN 0714816914.
- —— (1977). Burgundy. Batsford. ISBN 0713408898. (co-author with Anthony Turner)
- —— (1978). Dutch Townscape Painting (Themes and painters in the National Gallery) (2 ed.). National Gallery.
- —— (1980). Rembrandt – The Complete Paintings (2 vols). Granada. ISBN 0586051341.
- —— (1981). Carel Fabritius – Complete Edition with a Catalogue Raisonne. Cornell University Press. ISBN 978-0801413940.
- —— (1982). Van Dyck. Phaidon Press Ltd. ISBN 978-0714822112.
- —— (1984). Scenes of Everyday Life – Seventeenth-Century Dutch Genre Painting. Ashmolean Museum. ISBN 1854441264.
- —— (1987). Flemish Paintings (The National Gallery schools of painting). National Gallery Company Ltd. ISBN 978-0947645410.
- —— (1991). Anthony Van Dyck: Drawings. Thames & Hudson Ltd. ISBN 978-0500092248.
- —— (1991). Rembrandt : the master & his workshop. New Haven. ISBN 0300051506.
- —— (1996). Rubens's Landscapes. National Gallery Publications. ISBN 185709154X.
- —— (1999). Van Dyck 1599-1641 (with Hans Vlieghe). Rizzoli International Publications. ISBN 978-0847821969.
- —— (2000). Utrecht Painters of the Dutch Golden Age. National Gallery Publications. ISBN 978-1857092141.

=== Translations ===
- Chatelet, Albert (1981). Early Dutch Painting. Phaidon. ISBN 0714820954.

He has also had articles published in a number of journals, including The Times and The Times Literary Supplement.

Cultural offices
Preceded by Roger Moorey	Director of the Ashmolean Museum; 1998–2014	Succeeded by Alexander Sturgis
