= Bendor Grosvenor =

British art historian

- Born: Bendor Gerard Robert Grosvenor; 27 November 1977 (age 48)
- Education: Harrow School; University of East Anglia; Pembroke College, Cambridge
- Occupations: Art historian; Television presenter
- Spouse: Ishbel Hall
- Website: arthistorynews.com

Bendor Gerard Robert Grosvenor (born 27 November 1977) is a British art historian, writer and former art dealer. He is known for discovering a number of important lost artworks by Old Master artists, including Sir Peter Paul Rubens, Claude Lorrain and Peter Brueghel the Younger. As a dealer, he specialised in Old Masters, with a particular interest in Anthony van Dyck.

== Early life and education ==
Grosvenor was born on 27 November 1977 in London, England. His parents are The Honourable Richard Alexander Grosvenor and Gabriella née Speckert.

The name Bendor is derived from the Grosvenor family's medieval heraldic shield, a bend or, a golden bend (diagonal stripe), which they used until 1389, when it was ruled (in the case of Scrope v Grosvenor) that the Scrope family had a better claim to it. Hugh Grosvenor, 2nd Duke of Westminster (1879–1953), was nicknamed "Bendor".

Grosvenor is a grandson of Robert Grosvenor, 5th Baron Ebury, and a fifth cousin of Hugh Grosvenor, 7th Duke of Westminster. He is also of Swiss and Dutch heritage. His father's eldest half-brother is Francis Grosvenor, 8th Earl of Wilton.

Grosvenor was educated at Harrow School before attending the University of East Anglia for his BA. He then received an MPhil from Pembroke College, Cambridge, and a PhD from the University of East Anglia. His PhD thesis was entitled The Politics of Foreign Policy: Lord Derby and the Eastern Crisis, 1875–8.

== Career ==
Before becoming an art historian, Grosvenor worked in politics as an adviser, first to the Labour MP Tony Banks (later Lord Stratford) and then to the Conservative MP Hugo Swire (now Lord Swire).

His first major art discovery was a mis-catalogued portrait by Sir Thomas Lawrence being sold at a London auction in 2003 as a work by Lawrence's pupil George Henry Harlow. From 2005 until 2014, he worked for Philip Mould Ltd, where he made a number of significant art historical discoveries, including lost works by artists such as Sir Joshua Reynolds, Thomas Gainsborough and Sir Anthony van Dyck, on whom he is an acknowledged specialist.

From 2011 to 2016, he carried out specialist research for, and appeared in, the BBC1 art programme Fake or Fortune?. From 2016 to 2022, he co-presented the BBC4 series Britain's Lost Masterpieces with Jacky Klein (series 1) and Emma Dabiri (series 2–5).

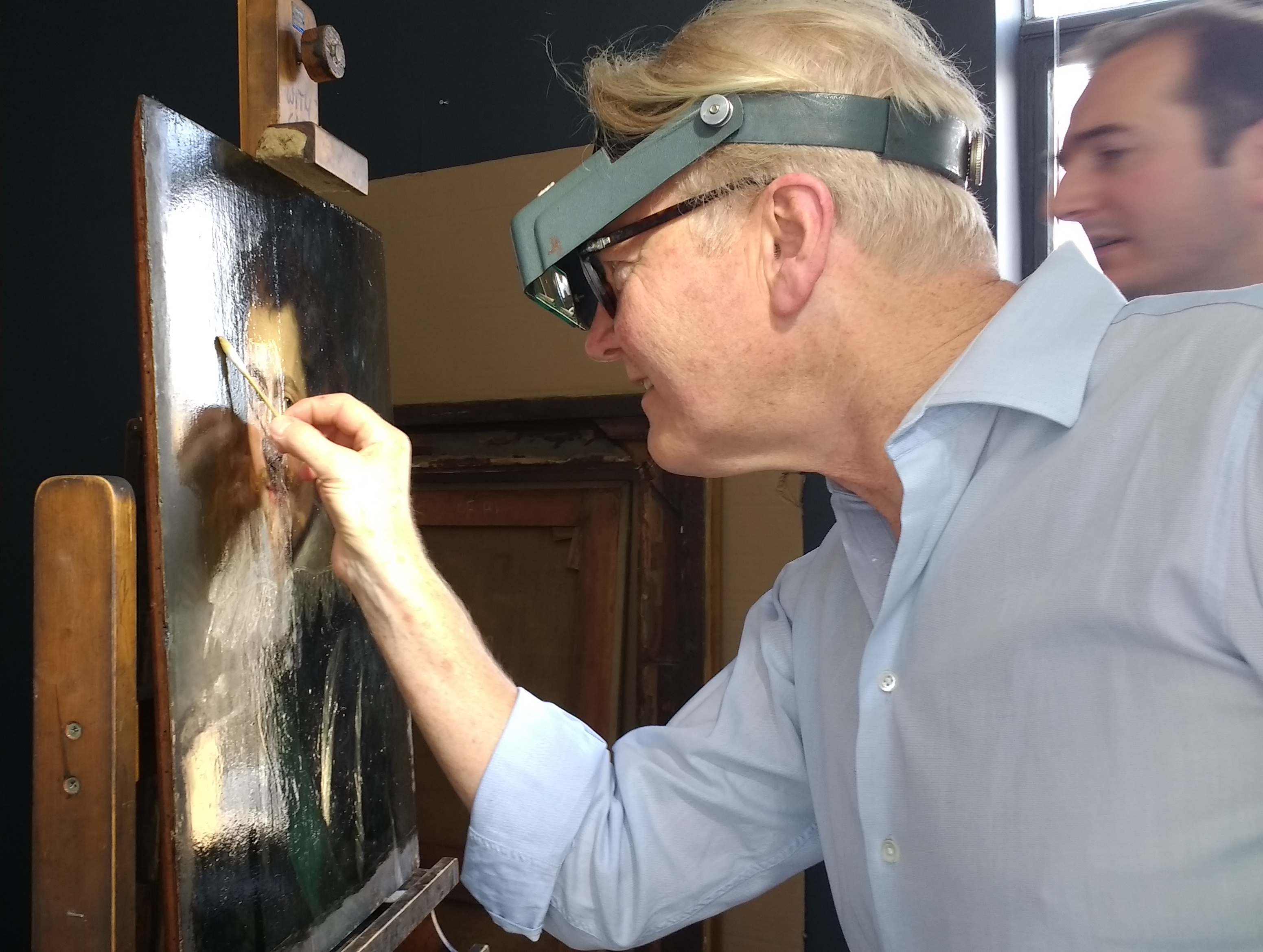
Simon Gillespie working on the portrait of George Villiers in 2017, with Grosvenor in the background

In 2016, he sold a newly identified portrait by Joan Carlile, the first professional British female artist, to the Tate gallery. In 2017, he discovered the "lost portrait" of George Villiers, 1st Duke of Buckingham, at Pollok House in Glasgow, Scotland. The painting was thought to be a copy of a portrait by Flemish artist Peter Paul Rubens that had been lost for nearly 400 years, but after restoration, it was found to be the original by Rubens.

Grosvenor has been a member of the Lord Chancellor's Advisory Council on National Records and Archives, and the Lord Chancellor's Forum for Historical Manuscripts and Academic Research. He also works as a journalist and writer, and presents programmes for BBC2's The Culture Show.

During the COVID-19 pandemic of 2020–21, he and his wife Ishbel investigated the route of the Roman road known as Dere Street through Lauderdale in the Scottish Borders.

Grosvenor was diagnosed with autism spectrum disorder as an adult, and he has advocated for improved accessibility at museums.

He was elected a Fellow of the Royal Historical Society in 2025.

== Jacobite portraiture ==
Grosvenor has made a special study of Jacobite portraiture. In 2009, he proved that the Scottish National Portrait Gallery's iconic portrait of Charles Edward Stuart by Maurice Quentin de La Tour was in fact a portrait of Charles' brother Henry Benedict Stuart, Cardinal Duke of York.

In 2013, he discovered the lost portrait of Charles Edward Stuart by Scottish artist Allan Ramsay at Gosford House, the home of the Earl of Wemyss near Edinburgh. This portrait is now on display at the Scottish National Portrait Gallery, and it has taken the place of the La Tour pastel as the definitive portrait of Charles.

== Personal life ==
In 2015, Grosvenor married Ishbel Hall (née MacDonald). He has one daughter and two step-sons.

He is a second cousin nine times removed to both Jacobite Princes, since he is a descendant of King Charles II and Louise de Kérouaille. Specifically, Bendor's great-grandfather was John Yarde-Buller, 3rd Baron Churston, a descendant of Charles and Henry's male-line second cousin Charles Lennox, 2nd Duke of Richmond.

Ancestors of Bendor Grosvenor

16. Robert Grosvenor, 2nd Baron Ebury
8. Francis Egerton Grosvenor, 4th Baron Ebury
17. Emilie Beaujolais White
4. Robert Grosvenor, 5th Baron Ebury
18. John Glasson
9. Mary Adela Glasson
19. Mary Phillips
2. Richard Alexander Grosvenor
20. John Yarde-Buller, 2nd Baron Churston
10. John Yarde-Buller, 3rd Baron Churston
21. Barbara Yelverton
5. Denise Margaret Yarde-Buller
22. Alfred John Smither
11. Jessie Smither
23. Jessicah Henrietta Pococke
1. Bendor Grosvenor
12. Joseph Speckert
6. Xavier Speckert
13. Mary Kälin
3. Gabriella Speckert
28. Johannes Arnoldus Jurgens
14. Gerardus Leonardus Stephanus Jurgens
29. Josina Jansen
7. Miriam Victoria Phyllis Jurgens
30. Luciano Carreras
15. Miriam Margherita Amalia Carreras
31. Margaret Gatey

== Publications ==
- Finding Van Dyck. Newly Discovered and Rarely Seen Works by Van Dyck and His Followers. Philip Mould Ltd. 2009.
- Grosvenor, Bendor; Hicks, Geoffrey (2009). Crap MPs: The 40 Worst Members of Parliament in History. London: The Friday Project. ISBN 9780007348688.
- Hicks, Geoff; Charmley, John; Grosvenor, Bendor, eds. (2012). Documents on Conservative Foreign Policy, 1852–1878. Cambridge University Press. ISBN 9781107035928.
- Rutherford, Emma; Grosvenor, Bendor, eds. (2013). Warts and All: the Portrait Miniatures of Samuel Cooper. Philip Mould Ltd. ISBN 9780992726409.
- Starkey, David (2007). Grosvenor, Bendor (ed.). Lost Faces: Identity and discovery in Tudor royal portraiture. Philip Mould Ltd. OCLC 122357300.

== Filmography ==
- Fake or Fortune? (2011–2016)
- The Culture Show – Venice: A Tale of Two Cities (2013)
- The Lost Portrait of Bonnie Prince Charlie: A Culture Show Special (2014)
- Britain's Lost Masterpieces (2016–2022)
