= Britain's Lost Masterpieces =

- Promotional image featuring Bendor Grosvenor and Emma Dabiri
- Also known as: The Art Detectives
- Genre: Documentary
- Presented by: Bendor Grosvenor (series 1–5); Jacky Klein (series 1); Emma Dabiri (series 2–5)
- Country of origin: United Kingdom
- Original language: English
- No. of series: 5
- No. of episodes: 16

Production
- Running time: 60 minutes

Original release
- Network: BBC Four
- Release: 28 September 2016 – 7 February 2022

Britain's Lost Masterpieces is a BBC Four documentary television series that aims to uncover overlooked art treasures in British public collections, in conjunction with Art UK. It is presented by British art historian Bendor Grosvenor, along with art historian Jacky Klein (series 1) and social historian Emma Dabiri (series 2 to 5). The series also features the art restoration work of Simon Gillespie. In North American syndication, the series is called The Art Detectives.

== Development ==
The series, which aims to uncover overlooked art treasures in British public collections, is produced in conjunction with Art UK. Each episode begins with Grosvenor locating a prospective masterpiece in the digitized collection of Art UK. The cleaning and restoration work of Simon Gillespie is often key to a successful attribution.

Grosvenor left his position working at Philip Mould's gallery in 2014, but continued to work on Mould and Fiona Bruce's programme Fake or Fortune? In 2016, Grosvenor took his idea for a programme looking at lost masterpieces in public collections to Tern TV, a production company based in Glasgow. Tern TV pitched it to BBC4 and then to the head of arts commissioning at BBC, Mark Bell. When the two co-presenters of Fake or Fortune? found out, they ended Grosvenor's involvement with Fake or Fortune? and complained to Bell the idea was too similar to their own show. Bell, however, greenlighted the programme, though its name was changed from the intended The Art Detectives to its current title. In the US, Mould's 1995 book Sleuth is called The Art Detective: Fakes, Frauds and Finds and the Search for Lost Treasures and Grosvenor's show is called The Art Detectives. Grosvenor maintains that the two series differ in that while Fake or Fortune? looks at privately owned art his programme focuses on paintings in public galleries.

The COVID-19 pandemic delayed production of Series 5, planned for Spring 2020. Production resumed in October 2020, only for Grosvenor to catch COVID-19, further delaying the third episode of the fifth series. Grosvenor later confirmed that this episode, not aired until 2022, would be the final episode, and that the fifth series would be the last.

== Episodes ==
=== Series 1 ===
Series one, comprising three episodes, was aired in September and October 2016.

No. overall	No. in series	Title	Directed by	Original release date	UK viewers (000s)
1	1	"Swansea"	Spike Geilinger	28 September 2016	575
A 17th century work by Jacob Jordaens found in Swansea museum.
2	2	"Aberdeenshire"	Spike Geilinger	3 October 2016	633
Three works, including a landscape by Claude and a Madonna attributed "After Raphael". The discovery caused considerable excitement at the time of broadcast, but three years later in 2019, experts concluded that it was "probably not" by Raphael.
3	3	"Belfast"	Spike Geilinger	5 October 2016	413
Works by Pieter Brueghel the Younger.

=== Series 2 ===
Series two was aired in September and October 2017.

No. overall	No. in series	Title	Directed by	Original release date	UK viewers (000s)
4	1	"Glasgow"	David Starkey	29 September 2017	546
Pollok House, Glasgow – a portrait of George Villiers, 1st Duke of Buckingham, is examined by the team. The picture was thought to be a copy of a work by Sir Peter Paul Rubens, but after thorough cleaning by Simon Gillespie and restoration, it is shown to be the original painting by Rubens.
5	2	"Derby"	Spike Geilinger	5 October 2017	523
Derby Museum and Art Gallery – an investigation is made of a veduta painting of the Ponte Nomentano on the outskirts of Rome. Once the heavy overpainting is removed, the picture is revealed to be a work by Joseph Wright of Derby, which is confirmed by art historian Brian Allen.
6	3	"Carmarthenshire"	David Starkey	11 October 2017	604
Carmarthenshire County Museum – a portrait of the 2nd Earl of Carbery is restored extensively and attributed to Sir Peter Lely, while a painting of the earl's second wife, Frances, has its attribution changed from Lely to Mary Beale.
7	4	"Arbroath"	Spike Geilinger	18 October 2017	784
Hospitalfield House, Arbroath – a portrait of an unknown man is investigated, which takes Grosvenor to the Prado museum in Madrid. After the painting is cleaned and restored, it is identified as a work by Antonis Mor, and the picture is authenticated by Professor Joanna Woodall of the Courtauld Institute of Art.

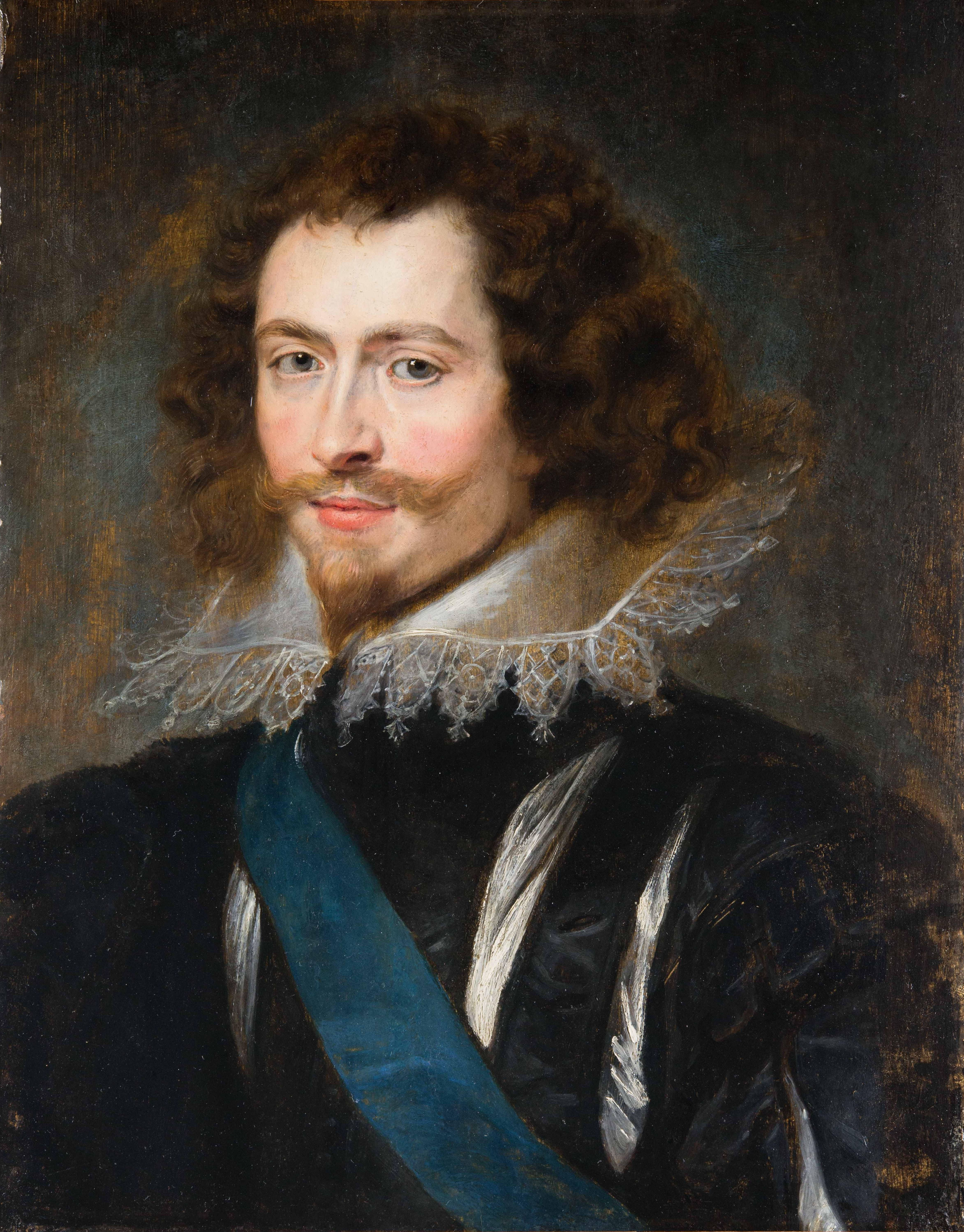
Portrait of George Villiers
(attributed to Rubens)

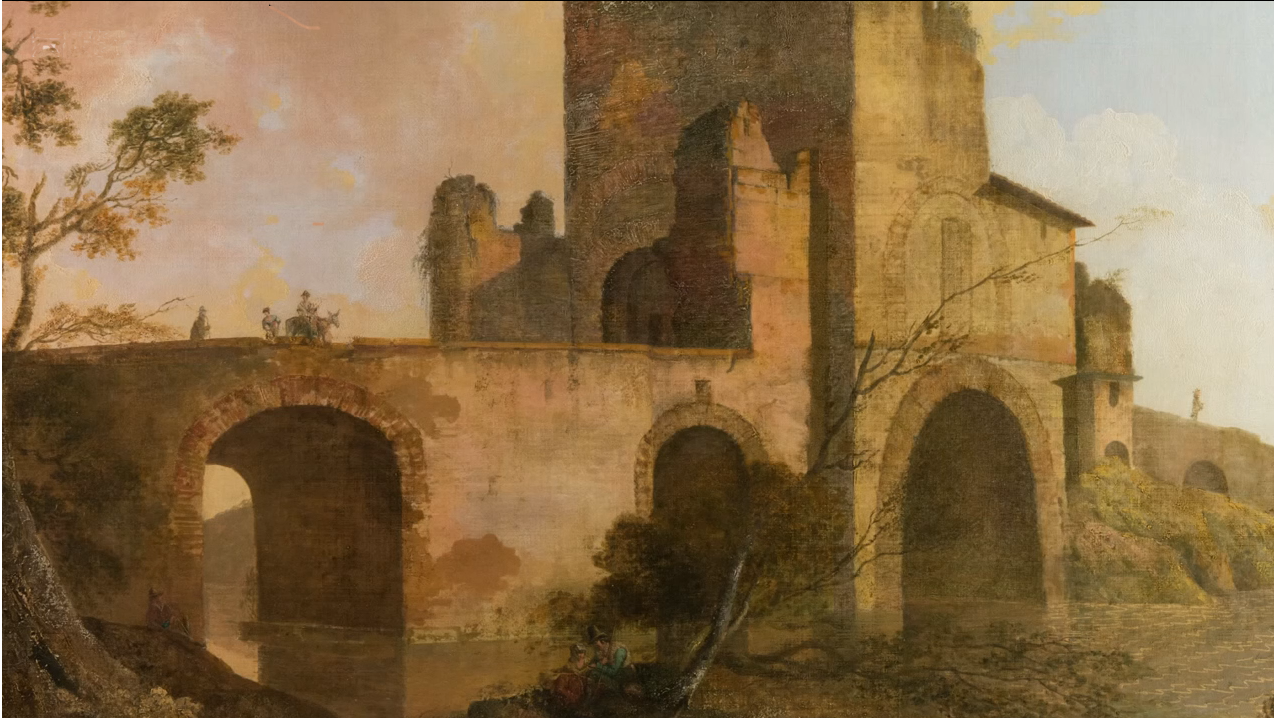
Ponte Nomentano
(attributed to Wright)

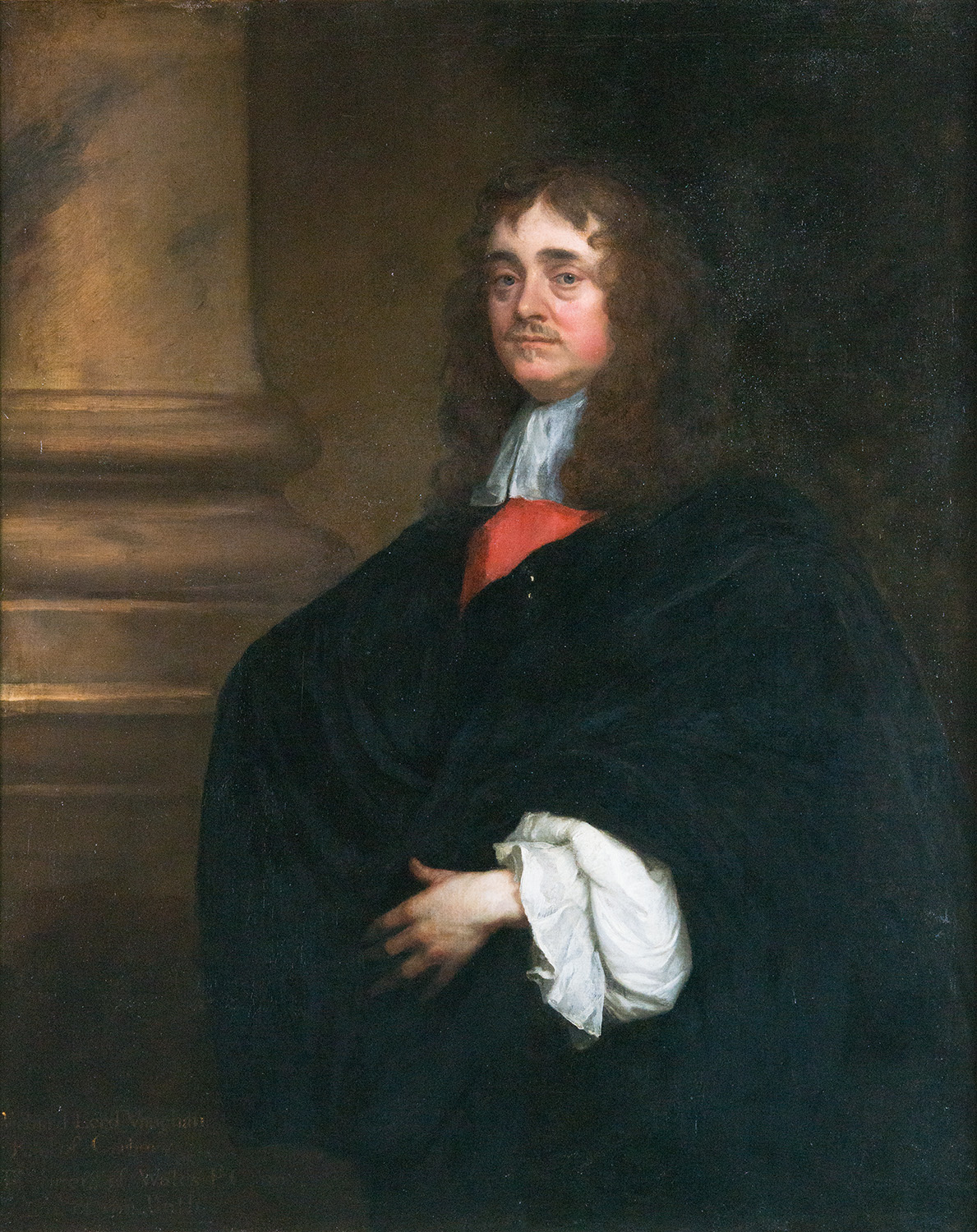
The 2nd Earl of Carbery (attributed to Lely)

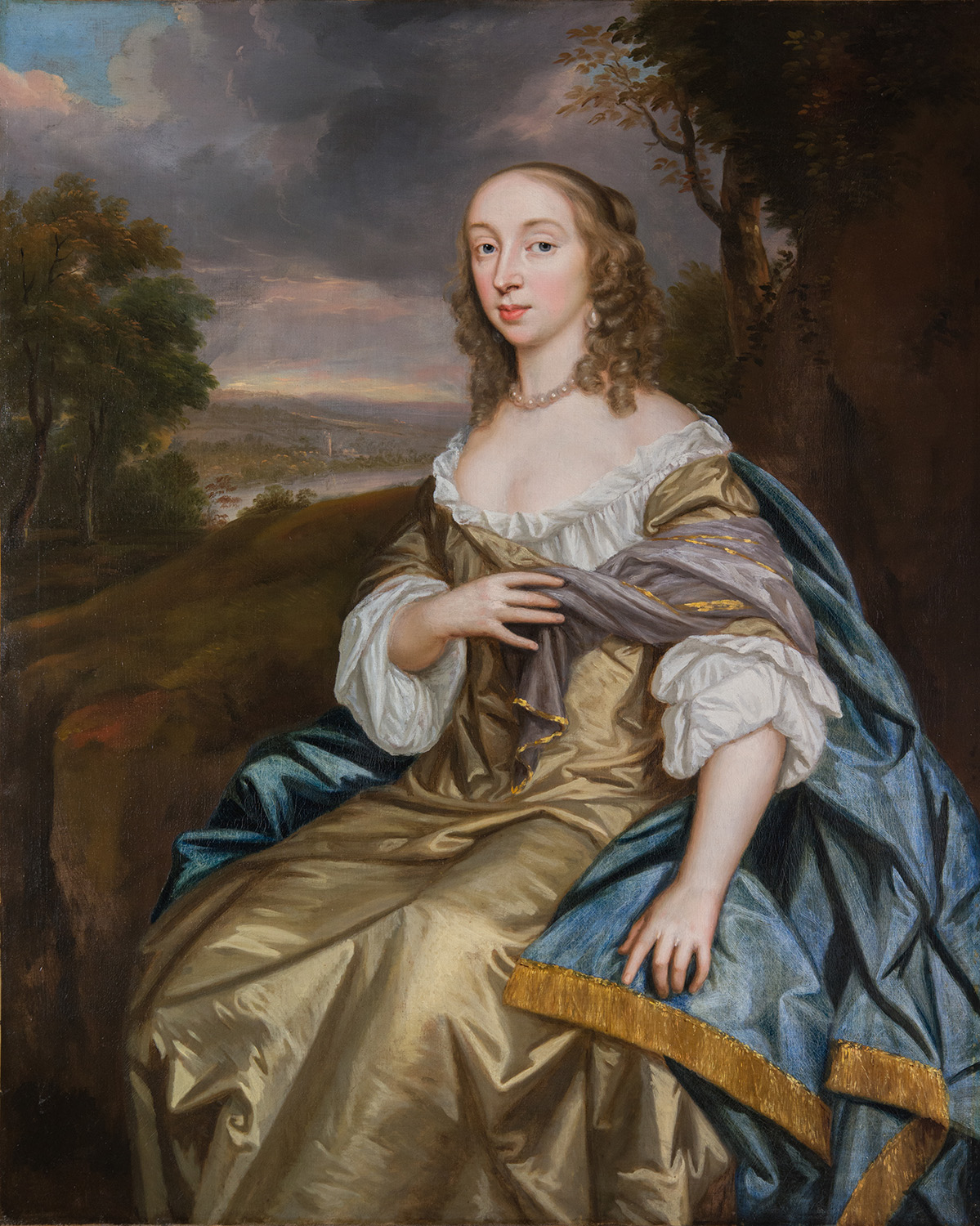
The Countess of Carbery (attributed to Beale)

=== Series 3 ===
Series three was aired in August 2018.

No. overall	No. in series	Title	Directed by	Original release date	UK viewers (000s)
8	1	"Devon"	Spike Geilinger	17 August 2018	664
Knightshayes Court, Tiverton – a small painting depicting a young Rembrandt that was classified as a mere copy of his Self-Portrait with Dishevelled Hair undergoes technical analysis, which suggests that it is actually from Rembrandt's workshop. Once the portrait's overpainting is removed, Grosvenor believes that it is a preparatory study by Rembrandt himself, but the Rembrandt expert Ernst van de Wetering is not convinced and still feels that it is a copy.
9	2	"Manchester"	Spike Geilinger	23 August 2018	639
Manchester Art Gallery – a painting that was thought to be a portrait of Charles Burney and attributed to Nathaniel Dance is restored and shown to be a work by Johann Zoffany.
10	3	"Petworth"	Spike Geilinger	30 August 2018	795
Petworth House, Petworth – a portrait of an unknown Genoese lady has the name Rubens displayed on its frame label, but Grosvenor believes that it is by Rubens' pupil, Anthony van Dyck. In addition, a painting of a young cardinal (possibly Giulio della Rovere), which had its attribution downgraded in the past from Titian to "School of Titian", is restored and re-attributed to Titian himself.

=== Series 4 ===
Series four was aired in October and November 2019.

No. overall	No. in series	Title	Directed by	Original release date
11	1	"Oxford"	Spike Geilinger	30 October 2019
Bodleian Library, Oxford – an examination is made of a portrait depicting a young man, George Oakley Aldrich, who graduated from the University of Oxford and became a medical doctor. The picture is thought to be a Grand Tour portrait that was painted in Rome around 1750. After considerable research and cleaning, the painting is identified as a work by Pompeo Batoni, which is confirmed by art historian Robin Simon.
12	2	"Birmingham"	Spike Geilinger	6 November 2019
Birmingham Art Gallery – two landscape paintings are investigated. The first one was bought in 1924 as a work by Thomas Gainsborough, but it subsequently lost that attribution. Once the painting is cleaned, expert analysis finds that the quality is not good enough to be a late work by Gainsborough. However, the picture is thought to be by Thomas Barker of Bath, who painted in the style of Gainsborough. The second landscape is in bad condition, and several areas had been heavily overpainted. Extensive restoration work is carried out to repair the damage, and the picture is revealed to be a collaboration between two artists. Most parts were painted by Joos de Momper, while the figures (known as 'staffage') are attributed to the workshop of Jan Brueghel the Elder, possibly by Jan Brueghel the Younger working in his father's studio.
13	3	"Cardiff"	Spike Geilinger	13 November 2019
National Museum of Wales, Cardiff – a painting from the late 15th century of a Madonna and Child is examined. After restoration and the removal of some unattractive overpainting, the picture is attributed to the studio of Sandro Botticelli, and parts of it may have been painted by the master himself.

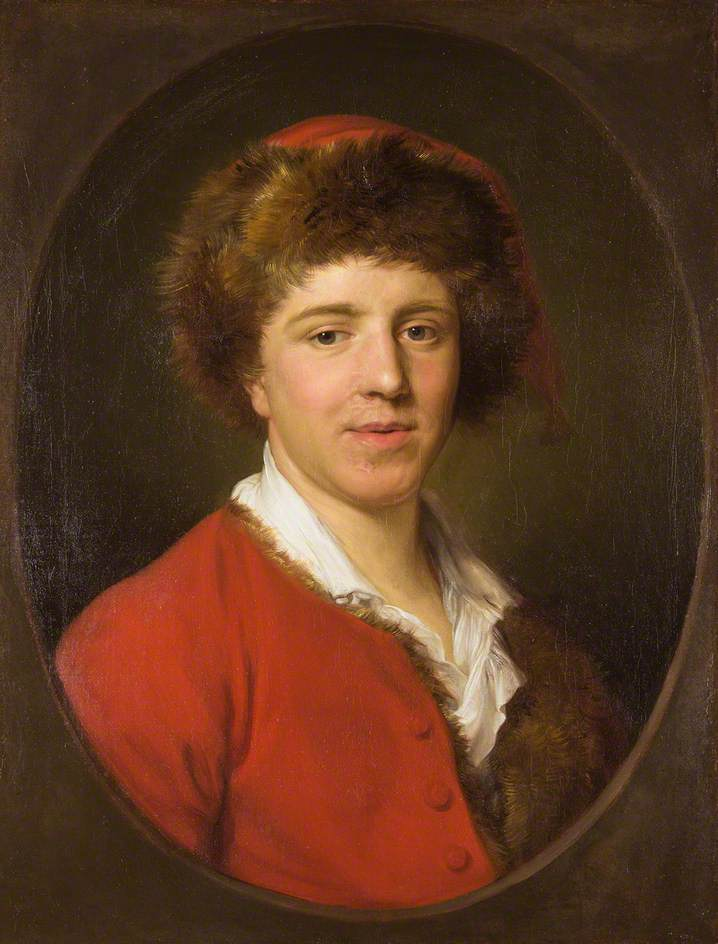
George Oakley Aldrich
(attributed to Batoni)

=== Series 5 ===
The first two episodes of series five were aired in February 2021, followed by a third in February 2022.

No. overall	No. in series	Title	Directed by	Original release date
14	1	"Brighton"	Spike Geilinger	1 February 2021
Brighton Museum & Art Gallery – two paintings of religious subjects are investigated, and Bendor has an idea of who painted them. After the works are thoroughly cleaned and restored, their respective artists are confirmed by experts. The first portrait is of a penitent Mary Magdalene, which is revealed to be by Francesco Trevisani. The second portrait is of Saint Balthazar, which was painted by Joos van Cleve.
15	2	"Tatton Park"	Spike Geilinger	8 February 2021
Tatton Hall, Knutsford – when a 16th-century portrait is first looked at, Bendor initially thinks that it may be by Parmigianino. However, after the painting is cleaned and extensively restored, his opinion changes, and the work is attributed to Francesco Salviati, who was influenced by Parmigianino. The bearded man in the portrait is believed to be Realdo Colombo, an Italian surgeon and professor.
16	3	"Glasgow"	Spike Geilinger	7 February 2022
Glasgow Museums Resource Centre – an examination is made of a portrait of a lady, which appears to be an unfinished work or preparatory study. The painting is analysed to determine if wax had been used in the paint, which would prevent cleaning. No wax is detected, but additionally the painting is coated with an old layer of very hard varnish, like boat varnish, which cannot be removed without damaging the paint. This makes proper cleaning almost impossible. So a 3D printing reproduction is created to show what restoration might have achieved. Grosvenor believes that the original was painted by Sir Joshua Reynolds, and this attribution is confirmed by expert Martin Postle. The portrait was long thought to be of Elizabeth Ann Linley, but there is doubt about this. Postle feels that the lady looks more like Anne, Duchess of Cumberland and Strathearn, but the sitter's identity remains unclear.
