= Anne Grosvenor =

Anne Grosvenor may refer to:

- Anne Wignall (1912–1982), English socialite and author, married name Grosvenor
- Anne Grosvenor, Duchess of Westminster (1915–2003), British racehorse owner
