= Olivia Grosvenor, Duchess of Westminster =

British aristocrat (born 1992)

Her Grace The Duchess of Westminster
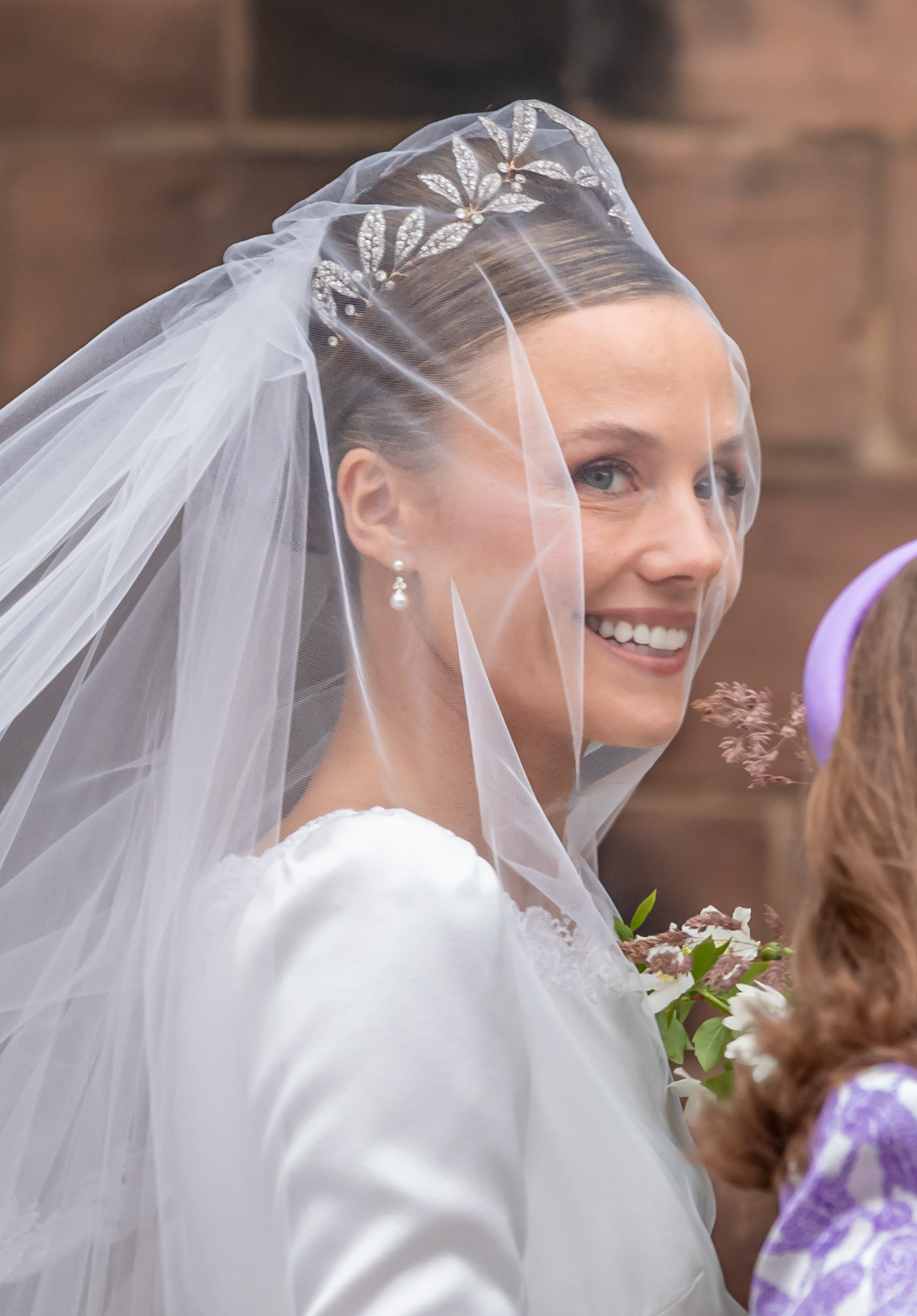
- Henson in 2024
- Born: Olivia Grace Henson; 1 September 1992 (age 34); London, England
- Education: Dragon School; Marlborough College; Trinity College, Dublin
- Spouse: Hugh Grosvenor, 7th Duke of Westminster (m. 2024)
- Children: 1

Olivia Grosvenor, Duchess of Westminster (née Henson; born 1 September 1992), is a British aristocrat. Upon her marriage to Hugh Grosvenor, 7th Duke of Westminster, in June 2024, she became Duchess of Westminster.

== Early life and family ==
Olivia Grace Henson was born on 1 September 1992 in London to Rupert Cornelius Brooke Henson, a banker, and Caroline Belinda Frisby, a descendant of London banker Henry Hoare III and Sir Richard Hoare, founder of the bank C. Hoare & Co.

She has a brother, Jasper and a sister, Emilia. Her brother is married to Isabel Rodríguez-Legorburu, daughter of the 6th Count and Countess of Asmir of Madrid.

Her maternal great-great-grandmother was Lady Geraldine Mariana Hoare (née Hervey; 1869–1955), the daughter of Lord Augustus Hervey, the sister of the 4th Marquess of Bristol and a great-granddaughter of the 5th Duke of Rutland.

Henson's great-granduncle Henry Peregrine Hoare's (1901–1981) first wife, Anne, Lady Ebury, was the mother of Francis Grosvenor, 8th Earl of Wilton, the late heir presumptive to Henson's husband's subsidiary title, Marquess of Westminster.

== Education and career ==
Henson attended Dragon School, a private school in Oxford, before attending Marlborough College, a boarding school in Wiltshire, alongside Princess Eugenie. She graduated from Trinity College, Dublin (TCD), with a degree in Hispanic Studies and Italian.

Henson works in the sustainable food and drinks industry. Since 2019, she has been working at Belazu, a London-based ethical food production company, and has previously worked for firms such as the pressed juices company Daily Dose.

== Marriage and issue ==
In April 2023, Henson's engagement to the 7th Duke of Westminster was announced. The duke had proposed on the Eaton Estate, his family estate, after nearly two years of being in a relationship with Henson. The Duke is close to the British royal family; he is the godson of King Charles III and godfather to Prince George of Wales and Prince Archie of Sussex.

The couple married at Chester Cathedral on 7 June 2024. Henson wore the 1906 Grosvenor Myrtle Leaf diamond tiara by Fabergé for the ceremony. The embroidery design on her bridal gown incorporated floral motifs and edgings from the circa 1880 veil worn by her great-great-grandmother Lady Geraldine Mariana Hervey upon her marriage in 1898.

The Prince of Wales served as an usher during their wedding. Guests included Princess Eugenie and Leonora, Countess of Lichfield. The service was officiated by the Dean of Chester, while the sermon was delivered by the Bishop of Chester. As the couple left the cathedral heading towards an awaiting car, disruption was caused by two members of Just Stop Oil.

On 27 July 2025, she gave birth to a daughter, Lady Cosima Florence Grosvenor.

Honorary titles
Preceded by Natalia Grosvenor, Duchess of Westminster (Until 2016)	Duchess of Westminster; 2024 - Present	Succeeded by Incumbent
Orders of precedence in the United Kingdom
Preceded by Duchess of Sutherland	Ladies; The Duchess of Westminster	Followed by The Duchess of Fife
