= Simon Rollo Gillespie =

British fine art conservator and restorer

Simon Gillespie
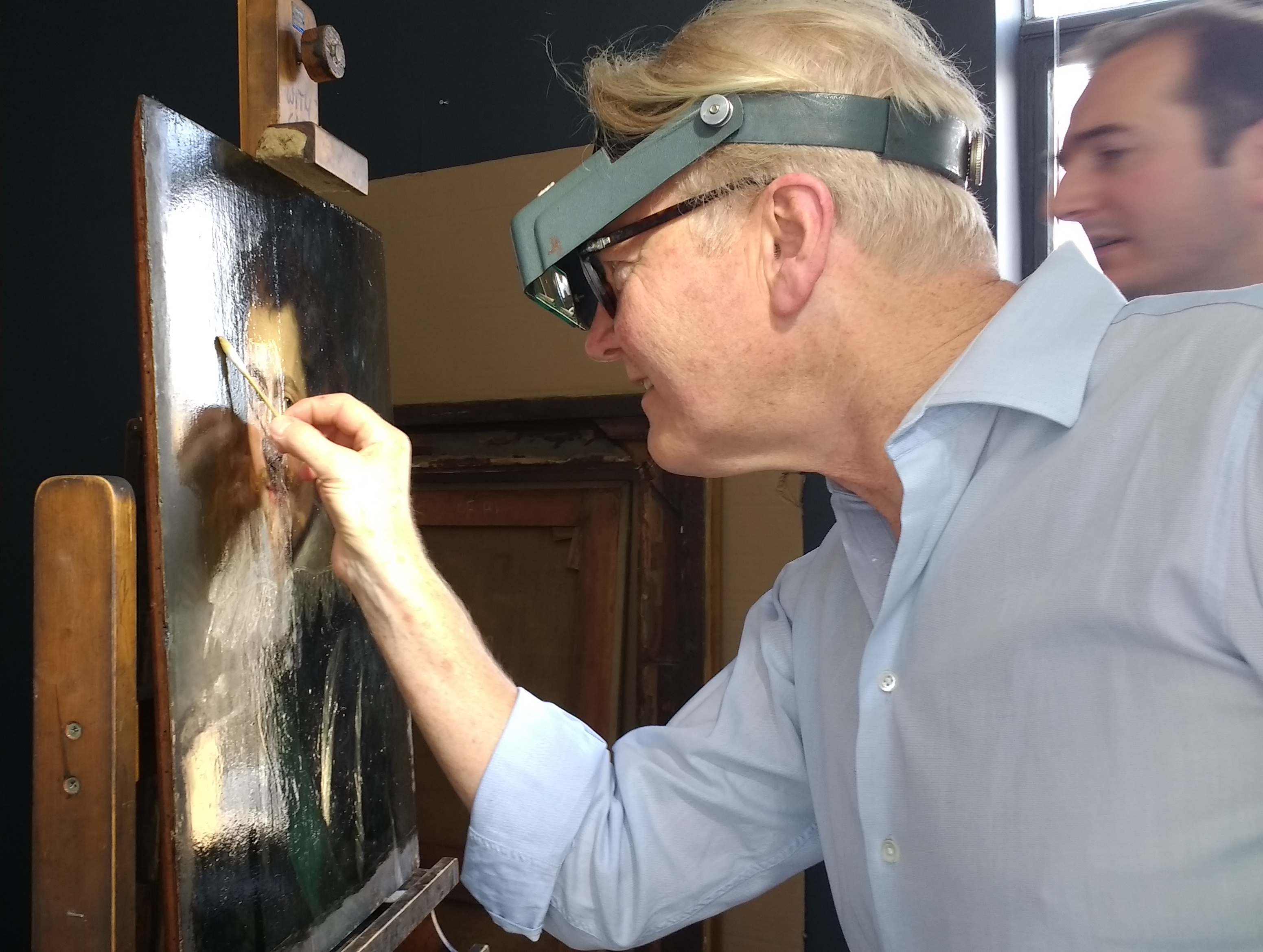
- Gillespie working on a portrait of George Villiers in July 2017
- Born: Simon Rollo Gillespie; 26 May 1955 (age 71); England
- Occupations: Art restorer, art historian
- Years active: 1978–present
- Notable credits: Britain's Lost Masterpieces; Fake or Fortune?
- Website: www.simongillespie.com

Simon Rollo Gillespie (born 26 May 1955) is a British conservator-restorer of fine art, and an art historian. He is known particularly for his work with Early British and Tudor portraits, although his practice extends across all periods from early paintings to contemporary artworks. Gillespie has been restoring art since 1978, and he appears frequently on the BBC Four series Britain's Lost Masterpieces, having previously appeared on the BBC One art programme Fake or Fortune?

== Early life ==
Gillespie was educated at Milton Abbey School, near Blandford Forum in Dorset. After an apprenticeship for cabinet-maker Martin Dodgsen and a spell as a viticulturalist in Germany, in 1975 he began his business of restoring and exporting vintage cars, moving onto restoring antiques and early English furniture.

After a three-year break travelling to Mexico and founding an English language school, Gillespie returned to the UK and began an apprenticeship in restoration and conservation of fine art paintings. During this time, he completed a Chemistry course related to conservation.

== Career ==
In 1982 Gillespie founded his own restoration studio, Simon Gillespie Ltd. His clients have included international art galleries, major auction houses, private and corporate collections, yacht owners and family offices, as well as museums that do not have their own conservation studios.

Since 2016, Gillespie has worked alongside Bendor Grosvenor on the BBC4 programme Britain's Lost Masterpieces. The conservation treatment carried out on paintings as part of this TV programme has resulted in the re-discovery of previously lost or unknown masterpieces, including:

- a mythological scene on panel by Jacob Jordaens;
- a portrait by Allan Ramsay;
- a portrait of George Villiers, 1st Duke of Buckingham, found at Pollok House in Glasgow, Scotland. The painting was thought to be a copy of a portrait by Flemish artist Peter Paul Rubens that had been lost for nearly 400 years, but after restoration, it was found to be the original by Rubens. Its discovery made the news worldwide.
- a portrait of a young cardinal by Titian in the collection at Petworth House;
- a pastoral scene by studio of Jan Brueghel the Elder and Joos de Momper at Birmingham Museum and Art Gallery;
- a portrait of George Oakley Aldrich by Rome-based fresco and portrait painter Pompeo Batoni; and most recently,
- a Madonna and Child painted in oil on panel from the National Museum Cardiff, long thought to have been an unimportant copy of a book Botticelli by an unknown artist, which after treatment was declared by Laurence Kanter, chief curator of the Yale University Art Gallery and a Botticelli specialist, to be “clearly” from Sandro Botticelli’s studio, with "more than a bit of it" by the master himself.

The most significant discovery arising from Gillespie's work on the show Fake or Fortune? (with Philip Mould and Fiona Bruce) was in 2015, when a Pietà from St John the Baptist's Church, Tunstall in Lancashire was revealed to be by the Italian painter Francesco Montemezzano. Philip Mould said of the result of Gillespie's conservation treatment: “It was an extraordinary transformation and on a scale that is pretty well unmatched."

== Involvement in discoveries ==
Gillespie has been involved in revealing lost masterpieces by van Dyck, including Magistrate of Brussels (discovered in 2013), and a portrait of Olivia Porter, lady in-waiting of Queen Henrietta Maria and wife of van Dyck's friend and patron, Endymion Porter. Gillespie has also worked on some recent discoveries of paintings that belonged to Henry VIII. In addition, in 2019 his contribution to online debates on the public forum of the Art UK website resulted in a painting at the Walker Art Gallery being confirmed as a portrait by van Dyck himself.

In February 2020, Gillespie announced the rediscovery of a lost masterpiece by 17th-century Italian female artist Artemisia Gentileschi. The picture, depicting David with the Head of Goliath and belonging to a private collector who brought it to Gillespie's studio for treatment after purchasing it at auction in December 2018, was published in an article written by Gianni Papi in The Burlington Magazine.

== Personal life ==
Gillespie married Cristina Rule, who was Mexican, and they had three sons. Gillespie was widowed after 25 years of marriage. In 2014, Gillespie married Philippa Found.

== Filmography ==
- Britain's Lost Masterpieces (known as "Art Detectives" in North America), (2016, 2017, 2018, 2019)
- Fake or Fortune?: A Mystery Old Master (2015)
- Fake or Fortune?: Munnings and Churchill (2015)
- Fake or Fortune?:Constable (2015)
- Antiques Roadshow: Van Dyck, Christmas Special Show
- BBC Culture Show: Your Paintings, Culture Show Special (2011/12)

== Publications ==
- Strong, Roy, Sir, (ed.) 600 Years of British Painting: The Berger Collection at the Denver Art Museum (1999). Metaphor Publishing. ISBN 9780965873321.
