= Bridgewater Treatises =

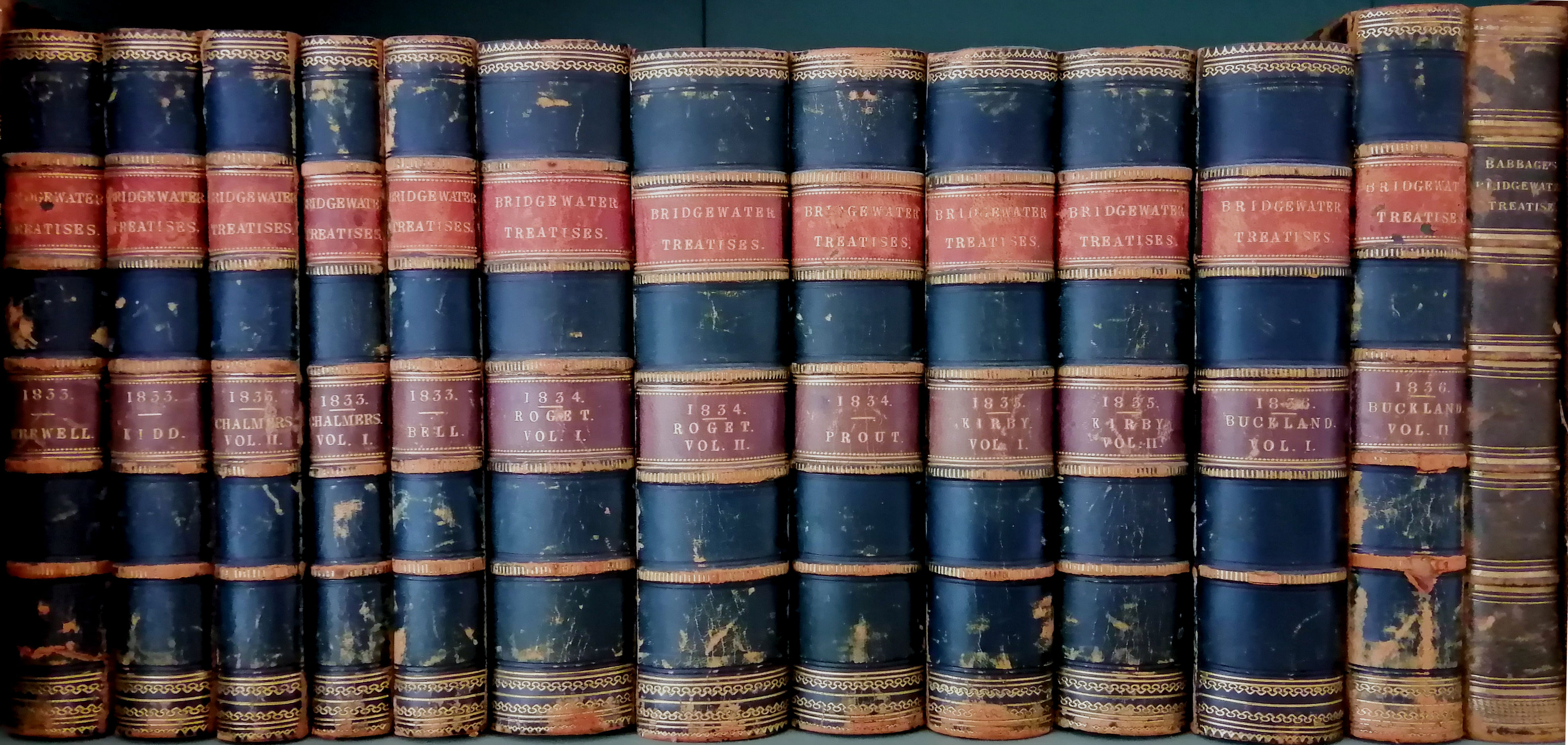
A set of the Bridgewater Treatises, rebound in leather, together with Charles Babbage's Ninth Bridgewater Treatise

The Bridgewater Treatises (1833–36) are a series of eight works that were written by leading scientific figures appointed by the President of the Royal Society in fulfilment of a bequest of £8000, made by Francis Henry Egerton, 8th Earl of Bridgewater, for work on "the Power, Wisdom, and Goodness of God, as manifested in the Creation."

Despite being voluminous and costly, the series was very widely read and discussed, becoming one of the most important contributions to Victorian literature on the relationship between religion and science. They made such an impact that Charles Darwin began On the Origin of Species with a quotation from the Bridgewater Treatise of William Whewell.

== The Bridgewater Bequest ==
Before unexpectedly becoming the 8th Earl of Bridgewater in 1823, Francis Henry Egerton spent most of his life as an absentee parson. He published works of classical scholarship and issued others praising the historical achievements of his family, including those of his father's cousin, Francis Egerton, 3rd Duke of Bridgewater, the "father of British inland navigation." In 1781, he was elected a Fellow of the Royal Society; after 1802 he lived mostly in Paris, where he amassed a collection of manuscripts later donated to the British Museum and gained a reputation as an eccentric. He died in February 1829, leaving a will dated 25 February 1825, in which he directed that £8000 was to be used by the President of the Royal Society to appoint a "person or persons":

...to write, print, and publish, one thousand copies of a work On the Power, Wisdom, and Goodness of God, as manifested in the Creation; illustrating such work by all reasonable arguments, as, for instance, the variety and formation of God's creatures in the animal, vegetable, and mineral kingdoms; the effect of digestion, and thereby of conversion; the construction of the hand of man, and an infinite variety of other arguments: as also by discoveries, ancient and modern, in arts, sciences, and the whole extent of literature.

The President of the Royal Society at the time was Davies Gilbert, who sought the assistance of the Archbishop of Canterbury, William Howley, and the Bishop of London, Charles James Blomfield, in selecting authors. Those appointed, with the titles and dates of their treatises, were:

1. The Adaptation of External Nature to the Moral and Intellectual Condition of Man (1833), by Thomas Chalmers, D.D.
2. On The Adaptation of External Nature to the Physical Condition of Man (1833), by John Kidd, M.D.
3. Astronomy and General Physics Considered with Reference to Natural Theology (1833), by William Whewell, D.D.
4. The Hand, its Mechanism and Vital Endowments as Evincing Design (1833), by Sir Charles Bell.
5. Animal and Vegetable Physiology Considered with Reference to Natural Theology (1834), by Peter Mark Roget.
6. Geology and Mineralogy Considered with Reference to Natural Theology (1836), by William Buckland, D.D.
7. On the History, Habits and Instincts of Animals (1835), by William Kirby.
8. Chemistry, Meteorology, and the Function of Digestion, Considered with Reference to Natural Theology (1834), by William Prout, M.D.

In the midst of a movement for reform in the Royal Society and a clamour surrounding the Reform Act 1832, the administration of the bequest was widely criticized. The calibre and reputation of the authors was, however, of a high order, and they included several prominent scientific figures of the age.

== The Bridgewater Treatises ==
The eight authors appointed to write the Bridgewater Treatises were offered little guidance about what was expected of them, and the individual works were varied. In particular, while the series has sometimes been seen primarily as a contribution to natural theology, the authors did not agree about the extent to which humans could acquire knowledge of God by observation and reasoning without the aid of revealed knowledge. Instead, the series offered "a working epitome of each of the main branches of natural science, and its final impact was expected to demonstrate the higher meaning of the order of nature and [...] to 'ennoble' empirical discovery into morality."

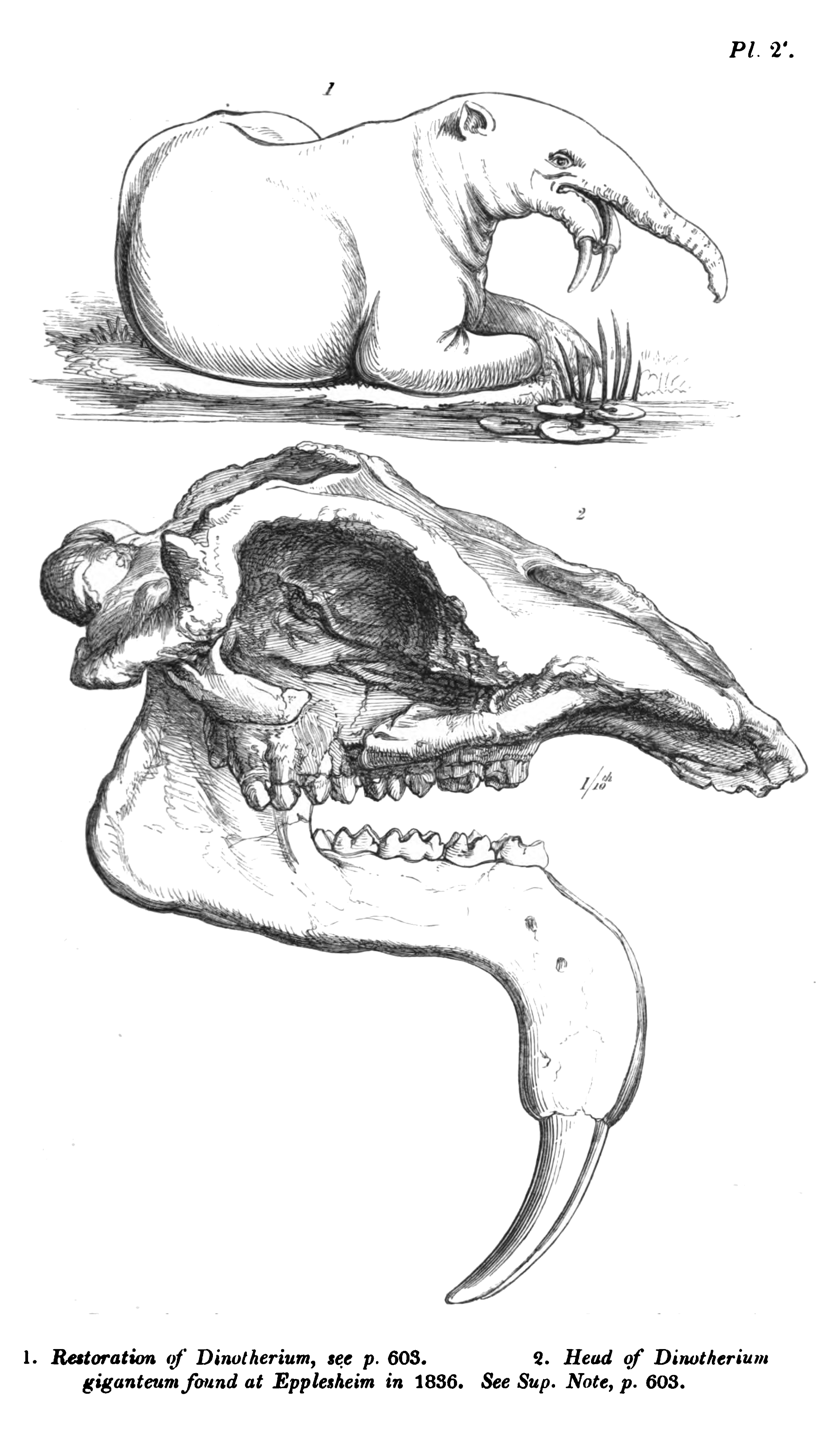
Illustration of remains and a reconstruction of the Dinotherium from the first US edition of William Buckland's Bridgewater Treatise (1837)

=== Clerical professors: Whewell and Chalmers ===
The treatises of the theologically capable university professors William Whewell and Thomas Chalmers were the ones that offered the greatest theological sophistication. In his work on "astronomy and general physics," Whewell claimed that his purpose was to "lead the friends of religion to look with confidence and pleasure on the progress of the physical sciences, by showing how admirably every advance in our knowledge of the universe harmonizes with the belief in a most wise and good God." In particular, he argued that the scientific view that nature was "governed by laws" was not at odds with belief in a creator, an argument later used by Charles Darwin. Scottish clergyman Thomas Chalmers's treatise on "the moral and intellectual constitution of man" argued that the human conscience and the mechanism of society manifested God's moral qualities, drawing heavily on his previously published views as a Malthusian political economist. He nevertheless placed severe limits on natural theology in a final chapter on "the defects and uses of natural theology."

=== Medical practitioners: Kidd and Bell, Roget and Prout ===
The two medical professors John Kidd and Charles Bell wrote shorter and theologically lightweight contributions. Kidd's work, on the "physical constitution of man," was claimed to be "but a moderate thousand pounds worth," Like Bell, whose limited subject was "the hand," Kidd set out to show that modern developments in anatomy did not support either materialism or the transmutation of species, instead confirming belief in the reality of divine design. The two other medical authors, Peter Mark Roget and William Prout, wrote lengthier contributions considering how the emergence of physiological laws enhanced the belief in divine design, rather than diminishing it. In his treatise on "animal and vegetable physiology," Roget argued that the laws of "philosophical anatomy" provided a grander vision of divine action. Prout's rag-bag treatise on "chemistry, meteorology, and the function of digestion" was more ambivalent, arguing that God's action was strikingly evident in the laws of chemical action, but also that many phenomena seemed to subvert the general laws.

=== The Bible and science: Kirby and Buckland ===
The final two treatises, those of William Kirby and William Buckland, both addressed the relationship of the Bible to scientific enquiry, but from very different perspectives. High Churchman Kirby's treatise on the "history, habits, and instincts of animals" began with a quotation from German naturalist Heinrich Moritz Gaede stating: "It is Bible in hand that we must enter into the august temple of nature." A follower of the view of theologian John Hutchinson (1674–1737) that the Bible contains hidden symbolic meanings, he argued that modern naturalists such as the transmutationist Jean-Baptiste Lamarck had lost their way by failing to honour the Bible. In stark contrast, the University of Oxford's Professor of Geology, William Buckland, declared in his first chapter that there was nothing in the Bible to suggest that the earth may not be ages old. Accepting the facts of geology only strengthened Christianity, he claimed, by offering new evidence of design and disproving the idea of the transmutation of species.

Ranging across the sciences, the Bridgewater Treatises took different approaches to trying to demonstrate how science was supportive of Christianity. Taken as a whole, they tended to imply that neither natural laws nor a historical process of creation were inconsistent with Christianity. However, they were opposed to both materialism and transmutation of species.

== Reception and responses ==
The Bridgewater Treatises were published by London publisher William Pickering and while they were very expensive (they were priced between 9s.6d. and £1 10s.) they nevertheless sold very rapidly. Buckland's treatise on geology sold a first edition of 5000 copies straight away and a second edition of the same size was immediately produced. The series was very widely reviewed and republished, and the treatises were also bought by a large number of libraries, including the libraries of the Mechanics' Institutes. In 1836, Thomas Dibdin considered that the Bridgewater Treatises were set to "traverse the whole civilized portion of the globe." Sales tailed off in the 1840s, but the series was reissued in Henry Bohn's Scientific Library from the 1850s, with some of the treatises remaining in print in the 1880s. The Bridgewater Treatises were republished in the United States by both New York publishers Harper & Bros. and Philadelphia publishers Carey, Lea, and Blanchard. They were translated into German by Stuttgart publisher Paul Neff, and some of the treatises appeared in French, Dutch, and Swedish.

The works are of unequal merit and they attracted criticism from a variety of standpoints. Some religious commentators criticized them for overemphasizing natural theology, for distracting readers from the claims of the Bible, or for undermining biblical authority. Some scientific commentators attacked their particular views on science. Robert Knox, an Edinburgh surgeon and major advocate of radical morphology, referred to them as the "Bilgewater Treatises", to mock what he called the "ultra-teleological school" of anatomy. Though memorable, this phrase overemphasizes the influence of teleology in the series, at the expense of the idealism of the likes of Kirby and Roget. The series nevertheless proved very successful in conveying the impression that modern science was in harmony with Protestant Christianity and it became an emblem of that harmony in Victorian Britain and beyond.

The great success of the series prompted authors to publish works in imitation. The most famous of these was by Charles Babbage and dubbed The Ninth Bridgewater Treatise: A Fragment (1836). As Babbage's preface states, this volume was not part of the series, but rather his own considerations on the subject written in response to the claim in Whewell's treatise that "We may thus, with the greatest propriety, deny to the mechanical philosophers and mathematicians of recent times any authority with regard to their views of the administration of the universe." Babbage drew on his own work on calculating engines to represent God as a divine programmer setting complex laws as the basis of what we think of as miracles, rather than miraculously producing new species by creative whim. A fragmentary supplement to Babbage's Fragment by Thomas Hill was published posthumously.

== See also ==
- Relationship between religion and science
- Natural theology
