= John Kidd (chemist) =

English physician, chemist and geologist (1775–1851)

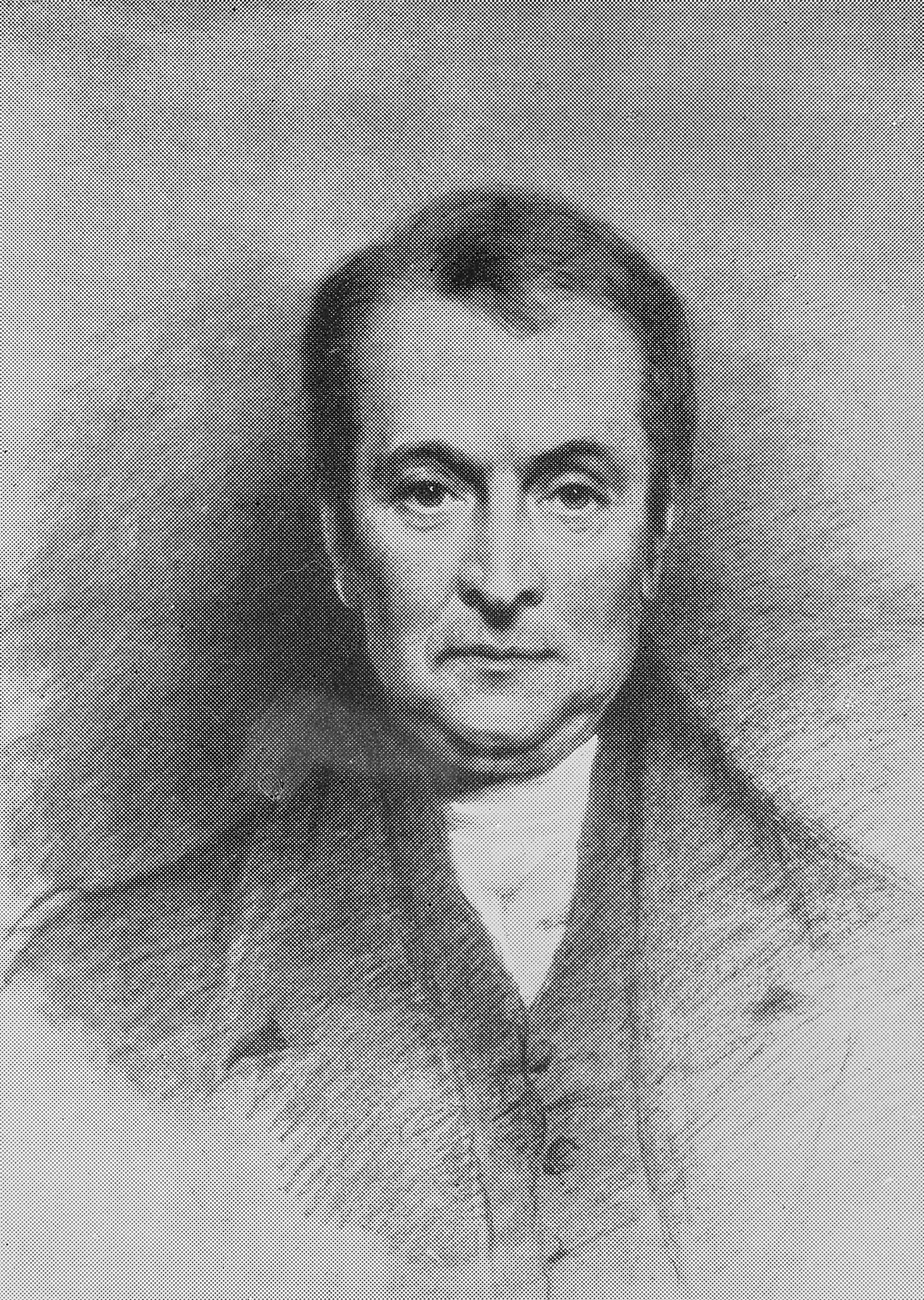
- Born: 10 September 1775; Westminster, London, England, Great Britain
- Died: 7 September 1851 (aged 75); Oxford
- Scientific career
- Fields: Chemistry; Geology

John Kidd (10 September 1775 – 7 September 1851) was an English medical doctor, chemist and geologist who took a leading role in Oxford's "scientific awakening" in the early years of the nineteenth century.

== Biography ==
Kidd was born in Westminster, the son of a naval officer, and was educated at Christ Church, Oxford. He became reader in chemistry at Oxford in 1801, and in 1803 was elected the first Aldrichian Professor of Chemistry. He then voluntarily gave courses of lectures on mineralogy and geology. These were delivered in the dark chambers under the Ashmolean Museum, where William Conybeare, William Buckland, Charles Daubeny and others gained their first lessons in geology. Kidd was a popular and instructive lecturer, and through his efforts the geological chair, first held by Buckland, was established.

Kidd's two geological publications—his Outlines of Mineralogy (1809) and Geological Essay on the Imperfect Evidence in Support of a Theory of the Earth (1815)—have been described as providing "the seeds of an Oxford school of geology," characterized by a distinctive emphasis on diluvial theory. In 1818 he became a fellow of the Royal College of Physicians; in 1822 Regius Professor of Medicine in succession to Sir Christopher Pegge; and in 1834 he was appointed keeper of the Radcliffe Library.

In March 1822 he was elected a Fellow of the Royal Society. In 1830 the president of the Royal Society appointed him as one of the eight authors of the Bridgewater Treatises "on the Power, Wisdom, and Goodness of God as Manifested in the Creation." His treatise on the "Adaptation of External Nature to the Physical Condition of Man," which was published in 1833, offered "a popular rather than a scientific exposition of facts" and set out to protect readers from materialism and the transmutation of species. Kidd refused to "maintain an argument" about natural theology, addressing himself "exclusively to those who are believers." He delivered the Harveian Oration before the Royal College of Physicians in 1836.

== Publications ==
- Outlines of Mineralogy (1809)
- A Geological Essay on the Imperfect Evidence in Support of a Theory of the Earth (1815)
- On the Adaptation of External Nature to the Physical Condition of Man (1833). This was the second Bridgewater Treatise.

== See also ==
- Bridgewater Treatises
