= Robert Grosvenor, 5th Baron Ebury =

British peer, military officer and racing driver

Robert Egerton Grosvenor, 5th Baron Ebury, DSO TD (8 February 1914 – 5 May 1957), was a British peer, military officer and racing driver.

== Early life and education ==
Lord Ebury was the elder son of Francis Egerton Grosvenor, 4th Baron Ebury and his wife Mary Adela Glasson and a member of the extended Grosvenor family headed by the Dukes of Westminster. The 1st Baron Ebury was a younger son of the 1st Marquess of Westminster. The latter's grandson became the 1st Duke of Westminster in 1874.

Ebury was educated at Harrow School. He succeeded his father in the barony in 1932

== Career ==
Ebury served as a Lord-in-waiting (government whip in the House of Lords) under Neville Chamberlain from 1939 to 1940 and in the Royal Artillery during the Second World War. He was awarded the Distinguished Service Order (DSO) for his bravery under fire during the Battle of Monte Cassino in 1944 and the Territorial Decoration (TD) in 1954.

== Marriages and children ==
Lord Ebury married firstly Anne Acland-Troyte (12 June 1912 – 23 June 1982), daughter of Herbert Walter Acland-Troyte, in 1933. They were divorced in 1941 having had two sons:

- Francis Egerton Grosvenor, 8th Earl of Wilton, 6th Baron Ebury (8 February 1934 − 4 September 2026)
- Hon Robert Victor Grosvenor (born 18 March 1936, died 1993)

In 1941 Ebury married secondly the Hon Denise Margaret Yarde-Buller (died 2005), daughter of John Yarde-Buller, 3rd Baron Churston. They were divorced in 1954 having had two sons and two daughters:

- Hon William Wellesley Grosvenor (12 September 1942 – 28 September 2002)
- Hon Richard Alexander Grosvenor (born 5 July 1946), the father of art historian, writer and television presenter Bendor Grosvenor.
- Hon Laura Georgina Kiloran Grosvenor (born 5 July 1946)
- Hon Linda Denise Grosvenor (29 June 1948 – 19 May 2019)

Ebury married thirdly Sheila Winifred Dashfield, daughter of Arthur Edward Dashfield, in 1954. No issue.

== Death ==
A keen racing driver, Lord Ebury died on 5 May 1957 at the age of 43 after an accident at Prescott Speed Hill Climb, Prescott, Gloucestershire while driving a Jaguar C-Type. He was cremated at Oxford Crematorium, where there is a plaque to him and his third wife Sheila, who died in 2010.

He was succeeded in the barony by his elder son from his first marriage, Francis, who in 1999 additionally succeeded a kinsman as the 8th Earl of Wilton.

== Arms ==
Coat of arms of Robert Grosvenor, 5th Baron Ebury
Coronet A coronet of an Baron Crest A talbot statant or. Escutcheon Azure, a garb or; a mullet for difference. Supporters Two talbots reguardant or, collared azure and charged on the shoulder with a mullet of the second. Motto Virtus non stemma. (Virtue, not ancestry)

Peerage of the United Kingdom
Preceded by Francis Egerton Grosvenor	Baron Ebury; 1932–1957	Succeeded by Francis Grosvenor
