= Suzy Klein =

British writer and radio and television presenter

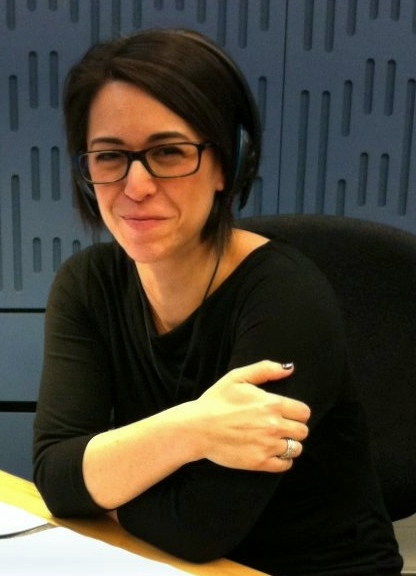
- Presenting In Tune on BBC Radio 3 in 2012
- Born: Suzanne Rebecca Klein; 1 April 1975 (age 51); Marylebone, London, England
- Education: South Hampstead High School; St Hugh's College, Oxford
- Occupations: Writer, broadcaster
- Years active: 1996–present
- Employer: BBC
- Children: 2
- Relatives: Jacky Klein
- Awards: William Hardcastle Journalism Award, 1996; Sony Bronze Award – In Tune, BBC Radio 3, 2012; Sony Radio Academy Awards. Silver Award – Music Broadcaster of the Year, 2013

Suzanne Rebecca Klein (born 1 April 1975) is a British writer and radio and television presenter, specialising in music and arts programmes. Since October 2021, she has held the post of Head of Arts and Classical Music TV for the BBC.

== Early years and education ==
Klein's grandfather fled Nazi-occupied Hungary in 1939, settling in the United Kingdom.

Klein was born in Marylebone, London, the eldest of four siblings, and grew up in Maida Vale, London. She attended South Hampstead High School before graduating with first-class honours in Music in 1996 from the University of Oxford. While there, she directed and produced short films and presented a weekly live arts show on the student radio station Oxygen FM. She gained a postgraduate diploma in broadcast journalism from City University London.

== Broadcasting ==
After winning the William Hardcastle Award for Journalism, Klein began her professional broadcasting career as a presenter on the Canadian Broadcasting Corporation's radio and TV services. She returned to the UK to work for the BBC as an assistant producer at BBC Radio 4 on programmes including Start the Week and Loose Ends. She then moved to BBC Television, working as a director and producer on a range of arts and music films.

Klein became a presenter in 2005, when she was listed in The Guardian's "25 up-and-coming cultural figures". In 2008, she presented the Proms season on BBC Two. She has also presented the BBC Two programmes The Culture Show, BBC Young Musician of the Year and The Review Show.

Until September 2021, Klein co-hosted BBC Radio 3's weekday morning show Essential Classics, alongside concerts and events. She was one of the lead voices on the station's major campaigns of recent years, including its celebrations of the complete works of Mozart and Schubert.

In 2011, Klein presented the first ever live opera in 3D, hosting the Director's Cut with Mike Figgis, a live, three-hour discussion with the director about his new production of Lucrezia Borgia.

For Sky Arts, Klein hosted the flagship performance programme Greats at Eight on weekday evenings on Sky Arts 2. She also presented Aida from the Royal Albert Hall (March 2012) for the broadcaster and The Rosenblatt Recitals in summer 2013.

In 2013, she was named Music Broadcaster of the Year, winning the Silver Prize at the Sony Awards. She has co-presented Saturday Live on BBC Radio 4, and has made a documentary for the station about fear and phobias.

She has presented global opera broadcasts for the Royal Opera, London, and hosted global cinema broadcasts of the Royal Shakespeare Company, including three live shows in 2014.

In April 2014, she presented the BBC Four television documentary series Rule Britannia! Music, Mischief and Morals in the 18th Century and in 2016 Revolution and Romance: Musical Masters of the Nineteenth Century, a three-part BBC Four series.

She has since made a series for the BBC on music and politics in the 19th century, and a three-part series on the history of popular entertainment (with Frank Skinner). In December 2016, she co-presented a film on the musical theatre classic West Side Story, with Bruno Tonioli for BBC Two.

In 2017, Klein presented the BBC Four documentary series Tunes for Tyrants: Music and Power with Suzy Klein, in which she explored music's crucial role "in the most turbulent years of the 20th century".

In August 2021, she was appointed to the newly created position of Head of Arts and Classical Music TV starting from 4 October 2021.

In 2025, Klein was an executive producer of the documentary The Last Musician of Auschwitz.

=== Voiceover ===
Klein has done a broad range of voiceover work, from BBC One primetime documentaries on Pink Floyd and The Carpenters to a three-part series on Brazil, and an arts TV series for BBC Four.

== Writing ==
Klein is a contributor to the features and review pages of the New Statesman, the BBC Music Magazine and The Guardian.

She co-authored a book with her sister Jacky Klein, entitled What is Contemporary Art? A Children's Guide, commissioned by the Museum of Modern Art, New York, and published in September 2012 by Thames & Hudson. It has been translated into seven languages.

== Personal life ==
Klein is married with two children and lives in Shepherd's Bush, west London.
