= Robert Bourne (doctor) =

English physician and professor of medicine

Robert Bourne, M.D. (1761–1829) was an English medical doctor and professor of medicine.

== Life ==
Bourne was born at Shrawley, Worcestershire, and educated at Bromsgrove. He was elected a scholar of Worcester College, Oxford, and became a Fellow of the college. He proceeded B.A. in 1781, M.A. in 1784, M.B. in 1786, and in 1787 took the degree of M.D. and was elected physician to the Radcliffe Infirmary at Oxford.

In 1790 he became a fellow of the Royal College of Physicians. In 1794 he was appointed reader of chemistry at Oxford. He was Harveian Orator in 1797. In 1803 he was the Aldrichian professor of physic, and in 1824 Lichfield professor of clinical medicine.

He died in Oxford on 23 December 1829. A monument was erected to him in the chapel of his college.

== Works ==
His published works are:

- 'An Introductory Lecture to a Course of Chemistry,' 1797
- 'Cases of Pulmonary Consumption treated with Uva ursi,' 1805
