= Lost portrait of George Villiers, 1st Duke of Buckingham =

Painting by Peter Paul Rubens

Portrait of George Villiers, 1st Duke of Buckingham
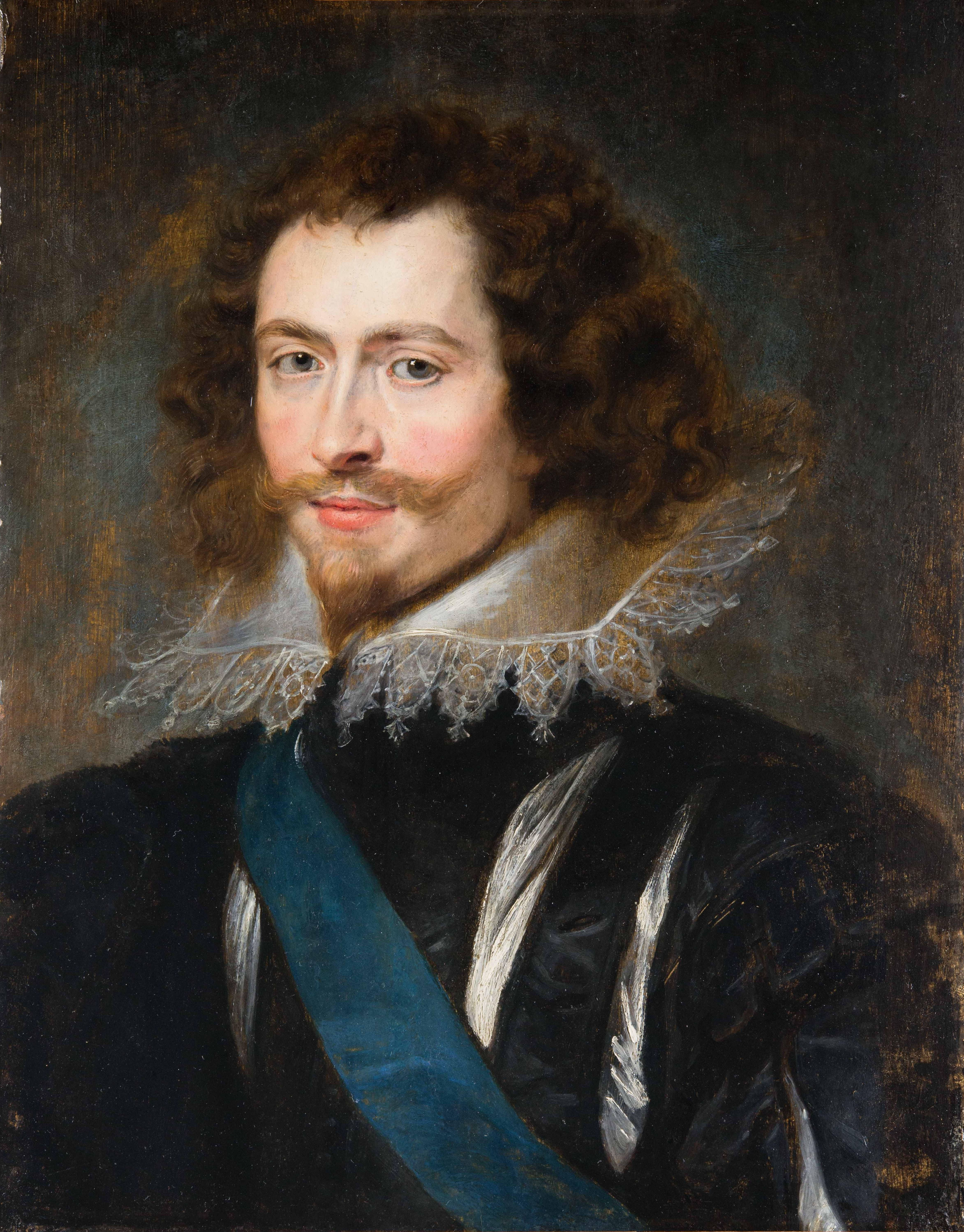
- Artist: Peter Paul Rubens
- Year: c. 1625
- Medium: Oil paint on panel
- Dimensions: 60.9 cm (24.0 in) × 47.3 cm (18.6 in)
- Location: Pollok House, Glasgow, Scotland, Pollok House

The "lost portrait" of George Villiers, 1st Duke of Buckingham is a portrait of English courtier George Villiers, 1st Duke of Buckingham. It was painted around 1625 — the same year that King James VI and I, who had counted Buckingham as his intimate favourite, died — by Flemish artist Peter Paul Rubens.

In 2017, the oil painting was examined by art historian Bendor Grosvenor at Pollok House, the former ancestral home of the Stirling-Maxwell family at Pollok Country Park in Glasgow, Scotland. Prior to this examination, the portrait was thought to be a mere copy of a Rubens painting that had been lost.

Once layers of old varnish and overpainting were removed over a period of two months by art conservator Simon Rollo Gillespie, the portrait was revealed to be the original work by Rubens himself. Ben van Beneden, the director of Antwerp's Rubenshuis, confirmed the authenticity of the attribution.

The portrait's examination, background research and restoration process were documented by the BBC Four television series Britain's Lost Masterpieces (series 2, episode 1), which aired in September 2017.
