= Jacky Klein =

English writer and art historian

- Born: 28 January 1977 (age 49); Marylebone, London, UK
- Education: South Hampstead High School; University of Oxford; Courtauld Institute
- Relatives: Suzy Klein

Jacqueline Amanda Klein (born 28 January 1977) is a British art historian, broadcaster, and author. In 2016, she co-presented Britain's Lost Masterpieces for BBC4 with Bendor Grosvenor. She co-authored a book with her sister, Suzy Klein, entitled What is Contemporary Art? A Children's Guide, commissioned by the Museum of Modern Art, New York, and published in 2012 by Thames & Hudson. It has been translated into seven languages. In 2015, she was announced as Executive Editor at Tate Publishing, a role she left in 2018.

== Selected publications ==
- The Bone Beneath the Pulp: Drawings by Wyndham Lewis. Paul Holberton Publishing, 2004. (With Paul Edwards) ISBN 978-1903470268
- Grayson Perry. Thames and Hudson, London, 2009. ISBN 0500093504
- What is Contemporary Art? A Children's Guide. Thames and Hudson, London, 2012. ISBN 978-0500515891
