= Francis Grosvenor, 8th Earl of Wilton =

English and Australian aristocrat and academic (1934–2026)

The Right Honourable The Earl of Wilton

Earl of Wilton
- In office 1999–2026
- Preceded by: Seymour Egerton

Baron Ebury
- In office 5 May 1957 – 4 September 2026
- Preceded by: Robert Grosvenor

Personal details
- Born: Francis Egerton Grosvenor; 8 February 1934
- Died: 4 September 2026 (aged 92) Clifton Hill, Victoria, Australia
- Spouses: Gilian Soames (m. 1957; div. 1962) Kyra Aslin (m. 1963; div. 1973) Suzanne Suckling (m. 1974; died 2018) Joanna Baevski (m. 2023)
- Children: Julian, Viscount Grey de Wilton; Lady Georgina Mitev
- Parents: Robert, 5th Baron Ebury; Anne Acland-Troyte
- Education: Melbourne University

Francis Egerton Grosvenor, 8th Earl of Wilton (8 February 1934 – 4 September 2026), was an English and Australian aristocrat and academic.

== Early life ==
Wilton was the eldest son of Robert Egerton Grosvenor, 5th Baron Ebury, and his first wife, Anne Acland-Troyte. He succeeded his father as 6th Baron Ebury in 1957 and his fourth cousin, Seymour Egerton, as 8th Earl of Wilton in 1999.

As the great-great-great-grandson of Robert Grosvenor, 1st Marquess of Westminster, Lord Wilton was also heir presumptive to the title of Marquess of Westminster currently held by Hugh Grosvenor, 7th Duke of Westminster, Lord Wilton's fourth cousin-once-removed. His stepfather from 1941 to 1947 was Henry Peregrine Hoare (1901–1981), son of Lady Geraldine Mariana Hoare (née Hervey, 1869–1955) and great great-uncle of Olivia Grosvenor, Duchess of Westminster.

== Career ==
Educated at Eton College, he pursued a career in the financial services industry in London, Melbourne and Hong Kong, before taking a doctorate in philosophy and arts at Melbourne University (2001), where he also taught as Dr Francis Ebury.

Wilton served on the board of directors of the Victorian Opera (Melbourne) from 2012 to 2017.

== Marriages and children ==
Wilton married four times. He was married firstly on 10 December 1957 to Gillian Elfrida Astley Soames (marriage dissolved 1962). They had one son:

- Julian Francis Martin Grosvenor, 9th Earl of Wilton (born 8 June 1959), married in 1987 to Danielle Rossi (divorced 1989).

Secondly, he married Kyra Aslin on 8 March 1963 (marriage dissolved 1973) without issue.

Thirdly, on 24 February 1974 at St. John's Toorak, Melbourne, he married Suzanne Jean Suckling (4 August 1943 – 12 April 2018). They remained married until her death 44 years later and had one daughter:

- Lady Georgina Lucy Grosvenor (29 March 1973 – 16 August 2003), a noted violist, married in 2000 to Peter Mitev.

His third wife was a biographer who wrote, under the name "Sue Ebury", The Many Lives of Kenneth Myer, Weary the Life of Sir Edward Dunlop and Weary: King Of The River. An editor and publisher, she was also a member of the Development Council of the National Library of Australia and patron of the Australian Garden History Society.

His fourth wife was Joanna "Jo" Baevski (5 April 1948 – 16 April 2026), grand-daughter of the Melbourne retail merchant Sidney Myer, whom he married on 21 February 2023 at St. Peter's Eastern Hill, Melbourne.

== Death ==
Wilton died on 4 September 2026 at Clifton Hill, Melbourne the age of 92.

== Styles ==
- The Honourable Francis Grosvenor (1934–1957)
- The Right Honourable the Lord Ebury (1957–1999)
- The Right Honourable the Earl of Wilton (1999–2026)

Peerage of the United Kingdom
| Preceded by Seymour Egerton | Earl of Wilton; 1999–2026 | Succeeded by Julian Grosvenor |
| Preceded by Robert Egerton Grosvenor | Baron Ebury; 1957–2026 | Succeeded by Julian Grosvenor |
