= Heinrich Moritz Gaede =

German naturalist and entomologist

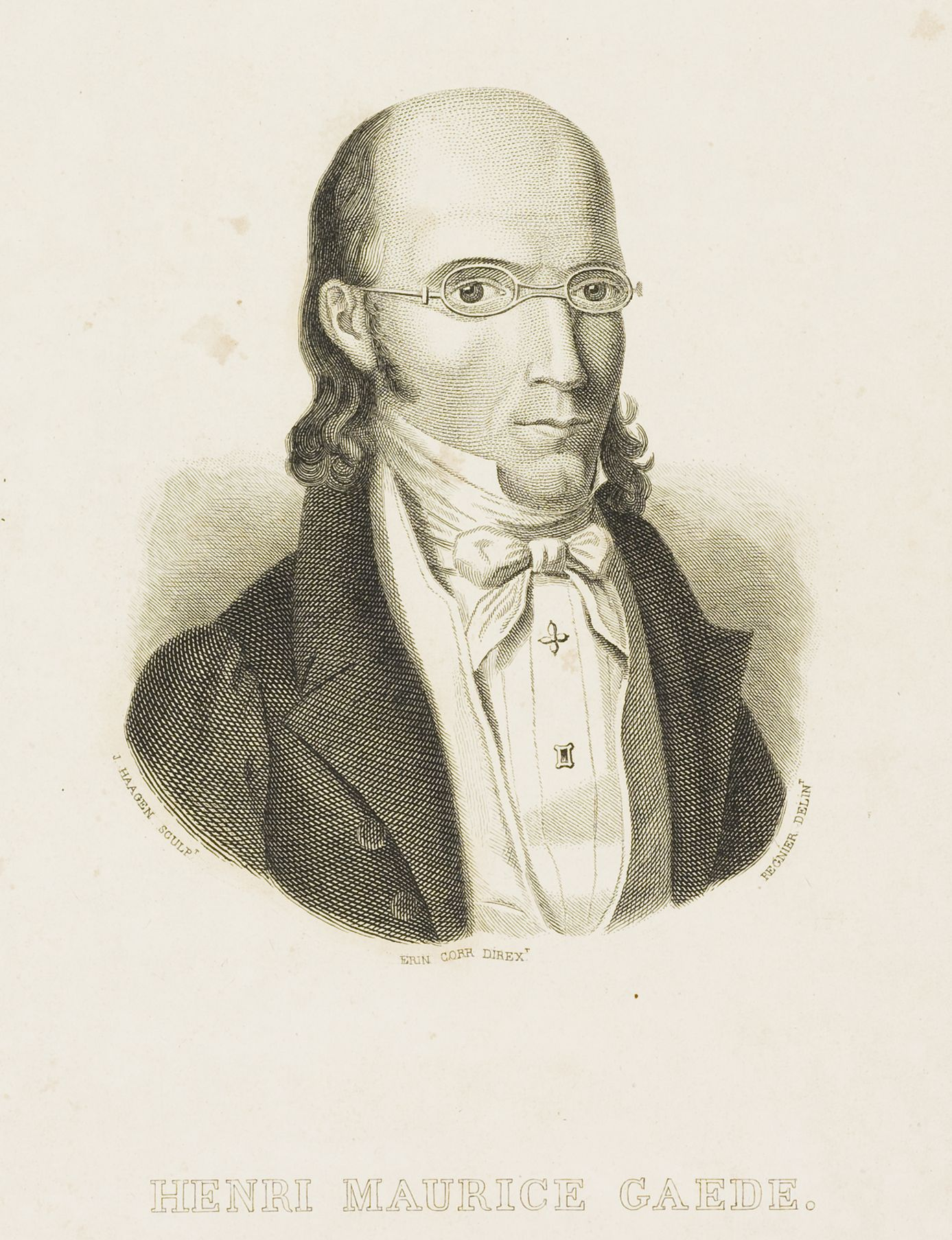
- Born: 26 March 1795; Kiel
- Died: January 1834 (aged 38); Kiel
- Scientific career
- Fields: Entomology; Natural history
- Institutions: University of Liège

Heinrich Moritz Gaede, also Henri-Maurice Gaede (26 March 1795 – January 1834), was a German naturalist and entomologist.

He was a professor in Lüttich and at the University of Liège. Gaede wrote Beitrage zur Anatomie und Physiologie der Medusen, nebst einem Versuch einer Einleitung ueber das, was den altern Natursorschern in Hinsicht dieser Thiere bekannt war (1816) and Beytrage zur Anatomie der Insekten Altona, J. F. Hammerich (1815).
