= Aldrichian Chairs =

University of Oxford professor positions

The Aldrichian Chairs were professorial positions at the University of Oxford during the nineteenth century, endowed by George Oakley Aldrich. His will left the residue of his estate to Oxford, to found in equal parts three chairs. By the 1850s the funds amounted to over £12,000. The handling of the chairs, however, was not of free-standing professorships, and by the end of that decade the funds had been repurposed.

== Chair of Chemistry ==
The initial holder of the Aldrichian Chair of Chemistry was John Kidd, from 1803. He resigned when the Regius Chair of Physic became vacant on the death of Christopher Pegge in 1822. Kidd made sure he was succeeded as Aldrichian Professor by Charles Giles Bridle Daubeny. For financial reasons Daubeny held onto the chair until 1854, when a college stipend he held was increased.

The third and final holder of the chair was Benjamin Collins Brodie, elected in 1855. It was renamed the Waynflete Chair of Chemistry in 1865. The funding was transferred in the 1870s to create the Aldrichian Demonstrator in Chemistry.

== Chair of Physic ==
From 1803 to 1824 Robert Bourne was the first Aldrichian professor of physic. The title is also given as "medicine", and the endowment was described as "annexed" to the Regius Chair of that area.

The endowment was also supposed to support an anatomy professor. In practice the anatomy funds were added to those from the benefaction of Richard Tomlins, to provide an anatomy reader. The anatomy funding was assigned to the Linacre Chair in 1858.

== George Oakley Aldrich ==
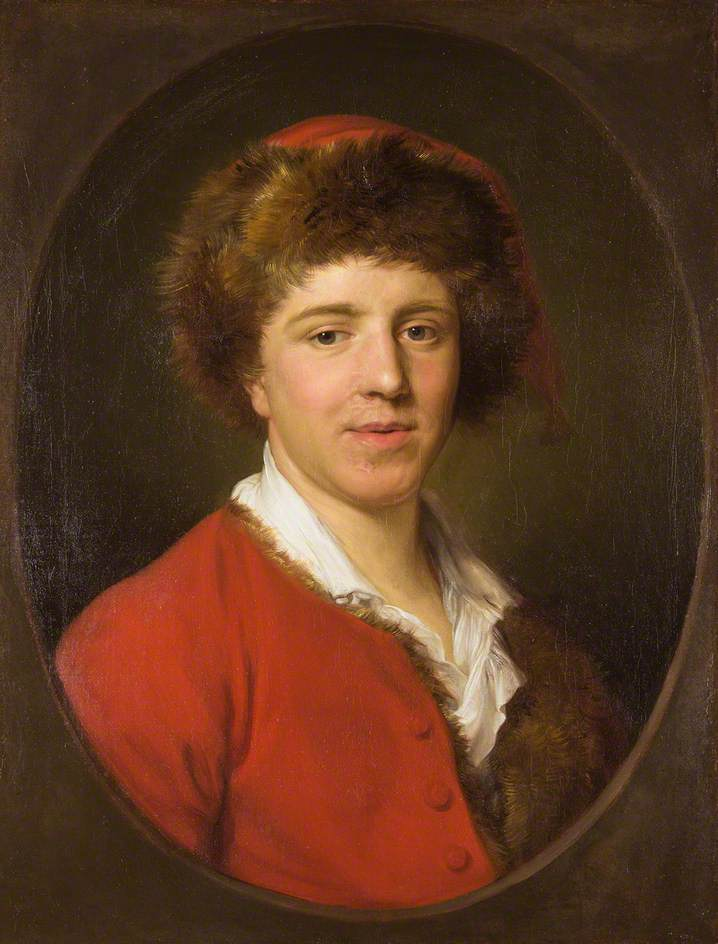
Portrait of George Oakley Aldrich by Pompeo Batoni, c. 1750 (Bodleian Library, Oxford)

Born in 1721 or 1722, he was the son of Thomas and Grace Aldrich of Holborn, and was educated at Eton College. He matriculated at Merton College in 1739, with his name registered as George Oakeley Aldrich. He graduated B.A. in 1742, M.A. in 1745, M.B. and M.D. in 1755.

He went on the Grand Tour and was in Rome in 1750 with John Neale – then an undergraduate at Merton, later parish priest at Tollerton, Nottinghamshire. While in Rome, Aldrich had his portrait painted by the artist Pompeo Batoni. The portrait was rediscovered in the Bodleian Library's collection, and after conservation treatment by Simon Gillespie, it was confirmed to be by Batoni.

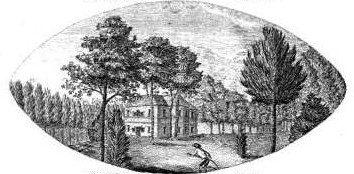
Cockglode House, 1797 engraving

Aldrich built up a medical practice in Nottingham, and he married Anne Bland in 1753. In the 1770s, Aldrich had moved on from residence at Mansfield Woodhouse to Cockglode House near Edwinstowe in Sherwood Forest, which he began to build in 1774 and occupied under lease from the 3rd Duke of Portland from 1777.

Aldrich married a second time, in 1783, to the much younger Sibylla Benson (died 1802), daughter of the Rev. Thomas Benson, rector of Bilsthorpe. Benson in 1770 had become curate at Ollerton Chapel, Edwinstowe.

The Duke of Portland was Chancellor of the University of Oxford from 1792 and became Home Secretary in 1794. Thomas Beddoes, of radical views and initially a supporter of the French Revolution, was a reader in chemistry at Oxford from 1787 to 1793, when he left for Bristol. It has been suggested that Portland may have influenced Aldrich to include chemistry in founding by bequest the Aldrichian Chairs. In 1792, an Oxford Regius Chair of Chemistry, for which Beddoes would have been a candidate, was mooted but was then put on hold.

Aldrich died in 1797 and had no child as heir. After some individual legacies, his lengthy will left a considerable sum to found the three Chairs that bore his name. The portrait of him was given to the Bodleian Library in 1837 by one of Sibylla's sisters. The next tenant at Cockglode was Robert Shore Milnes, who left his position in Canada, which had brought him into contact with Portland, in 1805.
