= Emma Dabiri =

Irish writer and broadcaster (born 1979)

Emma Dabiri FRSL
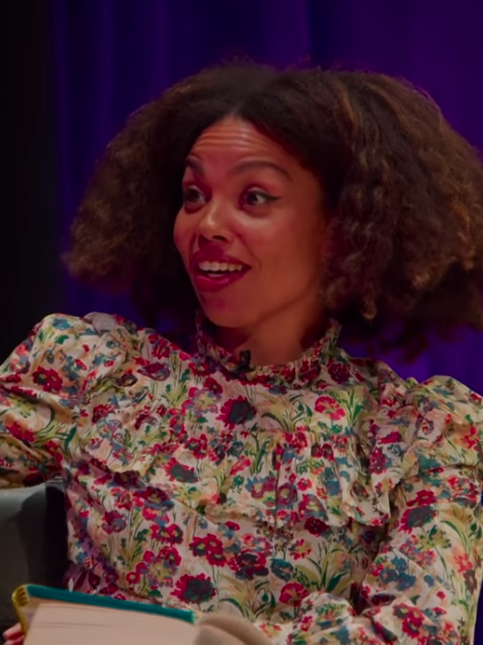
- Dabiri in 2021
- Born: Dublin, Ireland
- Occupations: Author; Broadcaster

Academic background
- Education: SOAS University of London; Goldsmiths, University of London
- Influences: Fred Moten; Angela Davis; Audre Lorde; bell hooks

Academic work
- Discipline: Black studies
- Sub-discipline: African Diaspora Studies
- Main interests: Black feminism; Black Irish experience; Intersecting histories of Oppression; Marginalised history

Emma Dabiri FRSL (born 25 March) is an Irish writer and broadcaster. Her debut book, Don't Touch My Hair, was published in 2019. Her 2021 book, What White People Can Do Next: From Allyship to Coalition, became an international bestseller. She was elected a Fellow of the Royal Society of Literature in 2023.

== Biography ==
Dabiri was born in Dublin, Ireland, to an Irish mother and a Nigerian Yoruba father. After spending her early years in Atlanta, Georgia, in the United States, her family returned to Dublin when Dabiri was five years old. She says that her experience of growing up isolated and as the target of frequent racism informed her perspective. After leaving school, she moved to London to study African Studies at the School of Oriental and African Studies (SOAS), her academic career leading to broadcast work, including co-presenting BBC Four's Britain's Lost Masterpieces (aka The Art Detectives), Channel 4 documentaries such as Is Love Racist?, and a radio show about Afrofuturism, among others.

Dabiri is a frequent contributor to print and online media, including The Guardian, Irish Times, Dublin Inquirer, Vice, and others. She has also published in academic journals. Dabiri's outspokenness on issues of race and racism has caused her to have to deal with extreme trolling and racist abuse online. She says of this that "it's just words" and the racism she grew up with fortified her to deal with it. She is the author of three books: Don't Touch My Hair (2019), What White People Can Do Next: From Allyship to Coalition (2021), and Disobedient Bodies: Reclaim Your Unruly Beauty (2023).

Dabiri holds a Western Marxist's critique of capitalism, and in What White People Can Do Next, she dedicates a chapter to "Interrogate Capitalism", building upon the ideas of Herbert Marcuse, Angela Davis, and Frantz Fanon. Western Marxism places greater emphasis on the study of the cultural trends of capitalist society. Dabiri summarizes: "In fact, in many ways race and capitalism are siblings", and while "capitalism exists, racism will continue".

Dabiri lives in London, where she is completing her PhD in visual sociology at Goldsmiths, University of London, while also teaching at SOAS and continuing her broadcast work. She is married and has two children.

Dabiri has appeared on the television programmes Have I Got News For You, Portrait Artist of the Year. and Question Time.

== Don't Touch My Hair (2019) ==
Dabiri's 2019 book Don't Touch My Hair is a memoir featuring social commentary and philosophy. It explores African hair as a complex visual language from pre-colonial Africa up to modern-day Western society.

Dabiri explores the erasure, stigmatisation and appropriation of Black hair. The book covers the global history of racism towards Black hair, as well as Dabiri's self-acceptance. It explores the criminalisation of dreadlocks and the natural hair movement.

A review by Charlie Brinkhurst-Cuff in The Guardian described Don't Touch My Hair as "The first title of its kind, with fresh ideas and a vivid sense of purpose, Dabiri's book is groundbreaking."

The book was released in the US in 2020 under the title Twisted: The Tangled History of Black Hair Culture.

== What White People Can Do Next: From Allyship to Coalition (2021) ==
TIME magazine described Dabiri's 2021 book What White People Can Do Next: From Allyship to Coalition as

"Dabiri's manifesto for radical change in a world impacted by the pandemic and the surge of attention on the Black Lives Matter movement. With essays titled 'Stop the Denial,' 'Interrogate Capitalism,' and 'Denounce the White Saviour,' Dabiri marries historical context with contemporary commentary and analysis in a direct, accessible style, referencing thinkers including Fred Moten, Angela Davis, Audre Lorde and bell hooks."

== Disobedient Bodies: Reclaim Your Unruly Beauty (2023) ==
In Disobedient Bodies, Dabiri explores the world of modern beauty and how it has been used as a tool of oppression by patriarchy. Drawing on philosophies like the Cartesian idea of the separation of mind and body, attributing mind to male and body to female characteristics, she argues that the current political and social system is designed to keep people feeling insecure at all times. She suggests ways to embrace the unruliness and disobedience of the body, and says that beauty exists not as a superficial feature, but rather as a physical and spiritual harmony.

In a review of Disobedient Bodies, The Irish Times author Anna Carey writes: "This call to joyful disobedience is further proof that Dabiri is one of our most important and exciting thinkers and writers."

Dabiri released the book as an accompaniment to an exhibition, The Cult of Beauty, at the Wellcome Collection in autumn 2023.

== Bibliography ==
- Don't Touch My Hair, London: Allen Lane (an imprint of Penguin), 2019. Hardback ISBN 9780241308349, Kindle edition: ISBN 9780141986296.
- Twisted: The Tangled History of Black Hair Culture, Harper Perennial, 2020, ISBN 9780062966728.
- What White People Can Do Next: From Allyship to Coalition, Penguin, 2021. ISBN 9780141996738.
- Disobedient Bodies: Reclaim Your Unruly Beauty, Wellcome Collection, 2023. ISBN 9781800817920.
