= Anne Wignall =

English socialite and author (1912-1982)

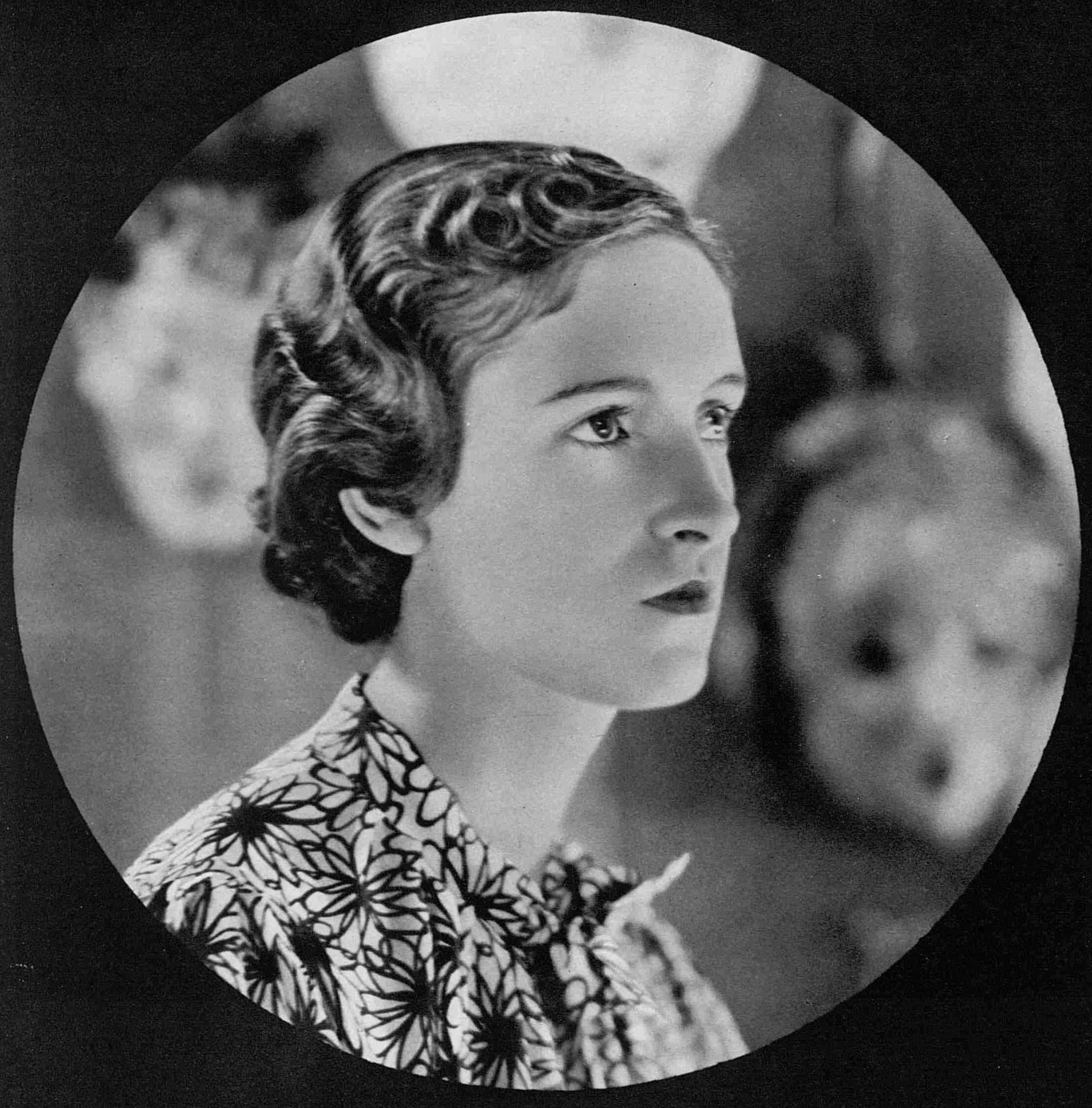
- Born: Anne Acland-Troyte; 12 June 1912; Kensington, London, England
- Died: 23 June 1982 (aged 70); Tiverton, Devon, England
- Resting place: All Saints Church, Huntsham
- Occupations: Novelist, Biographer
- Spouses: Robert Egerton Grosvenor, 5th Baron Ebury (m. 1933; div. 1941) Henry Peregrine Rennie Hoare (m. 1941; div. 1947) Lt.-Col. Frederick Edwin Barton Wignall (m. 1947; died 1956) Anthony Freire Marreco (m. 1961)
- Children: 3 including 8th Earl of Wilton
- Relatives: Sir Gilbert Acland-Troyte (uncle), Charles Pym (grandfather), Sir Thomas Acland, 10th Baronet (great great grandfather)
- Writing career
- Pen name: Alice Acland, Anne Marreco

Anne Wignall, known as Baroness Ebury and Lady Ebury (née Acland-Troyte; 12 June 1912 – 23 June 1982), was an English socialite and author known as Alice Acland and Anne Marreco.

== Family life ==
Anne Wignall was born Anne Acland-Troyte in the London Borough of Kensington, the daughter of Herbert Walter Acland-Troyte and Marjorie Florence Pym. She had one younger brother, John Acland-Troyte.

She married:

- On 1 July 1933, the 5th Baron Ebury (1914-1957). They had two sons, Francis Egerton Grosvenor, 8th Earl of Wilton (1934−2026) and the Hon. Robert Victor Grosvenor (1936–1993). They were divorced in 1941. During their marriage they lived at Redheath (now York House School), Croxley Green, Watford, Kingston Bagpuize House, North Berkshire (now in Oxfordshire) and Day's House (now Philberd's Manor), East Hanney, Berkshire.
- On 23 December 1941, Henry Peregrine Rennie Hoare (1901–1981). They were divorced in 1947.
- On 13 November 1947, Lt.-Col. Frederick Wignall (1906–1956). They had one daughter, Caroline Louisa Wignall (born 1948). She was widowed in 1956.
- On 25 September 1961, Anthony Marreco (1915–2006), a junior counsel at the Nuremberg Trials, and later a founding director of Amnesty International.

She changed her name back to Wignall by deed poll in 1969 and died in 1982 in Tiverton, Devon. She is buried in the churchyard at All Saints Church, Huntsham close to her father's ancestral seat, Huntsham Court.

== Bibliography ==
Anne Wignall wrote 11 books under two different names:

As Alice Acland

- Caroline Norton (Constable, 1948) ASIN B0007G4CKG, a biography of the English social reformer and author
- Templeford Park (Constable, 1954) ASIN B000SEMHL8, a tale of country life in contemporary 1950s Britain
- A Stormy Spring (Constable, 1955) ASIN B002EO5JTW, a novel set in Sussex, Bruges and Paris, about the life of a fictional young lady, Emily Satersham
- A Second Choice (Constable, 1956) ASIN B0016RQZJQ, a novel about a young girl in love with a philandering middle-aged married man
- A Person of Discretion (Collins, 1958) ASIN B002JV9856, story of three sisters from Brussels becoming entangled in the black market and the resistance during the closing stages of the Second World War
- The Corsican Ladies (Peter Davies Ltd, 1974) ISBN 9780432004104, historical novel based on the extensive autobiographical writings of Laure Junot
- The Secret Wife (Peter Davies Ltd, 1975) ISBN 9780432004111, a historical novel based on the life of Françoise d'Aubigné
- The Ruling Passion (Peter Davies Ltd, 1976) ISBN 9780432004128, historical novel based on the life of Diane de Poitiers, a mistress of Henry IV of France

As Anne Marreco

- The Charmer and the Charmed (Weidenfeld & Nicolson, 1963) ASIN B001N8MF2E, a comedy of manners, in which the wife of a publisher falls in love with one of her husband's authors
- The Boat Boy (Weidenfeld & Nicolson, 1964) ASIN B0000CMAPN, a novel in which the anti-hero brings chaos to rural Ireland
- The Rebel Countess – The Life and Times of Constance Markievicz (Weidenfeld & Nicolson, 1967) ASIN B0006D8I46, a biography of the Irish revolutionary and politician
