= Pollok House =

Category A listed building in Glasgow, Scotland

Coordinates: 55°49′40.54″N 4°19′5.60″W

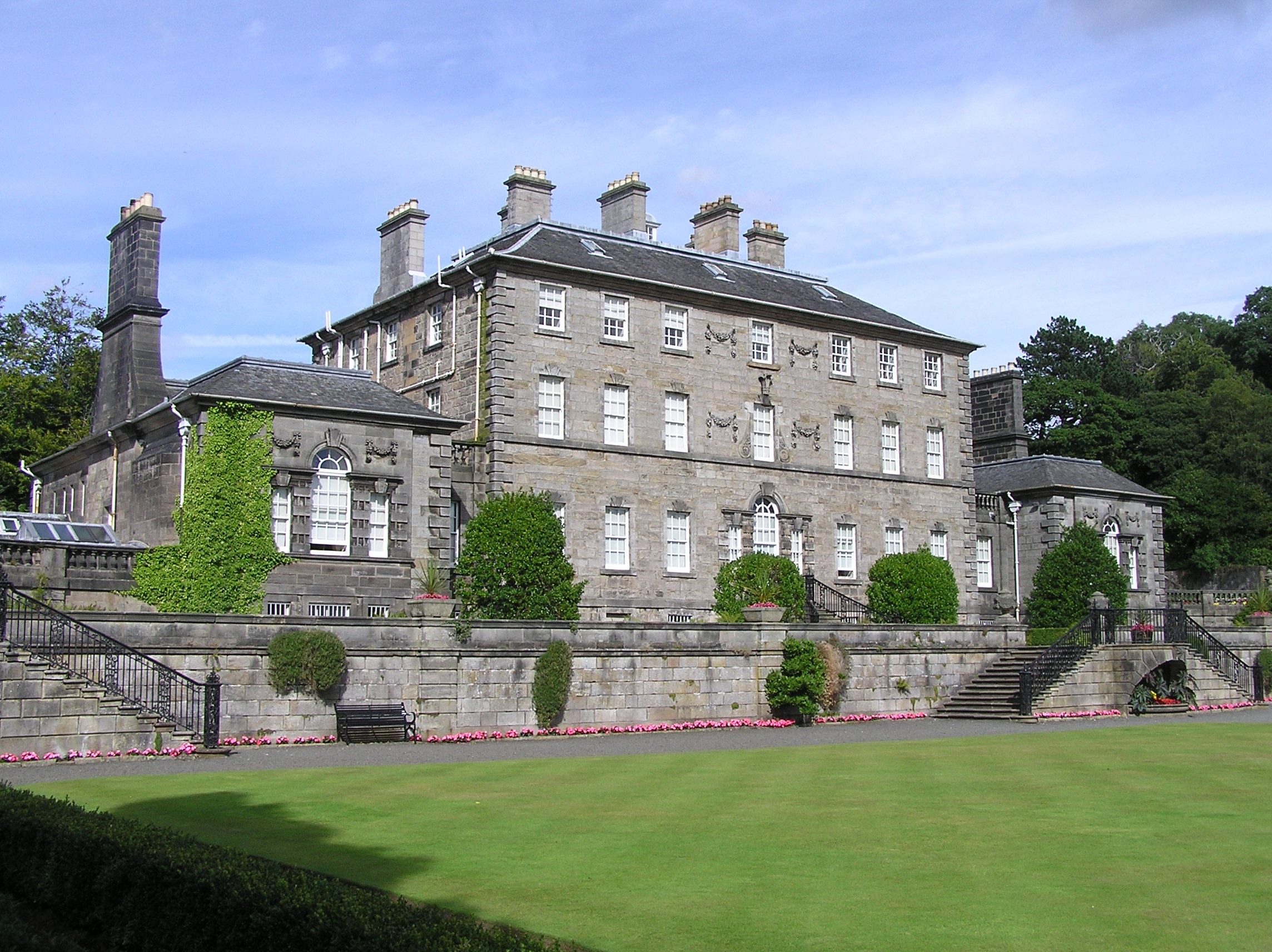
Pollok House

Pollok House, formerly the family seat of the Stirling-Maxwell family, is located at Pollok Country Park in Glasgow, Scotland (which also houses the Burrell Collection).

== Overview ==
The house, built in 1752 and originally thought to be designed by William Adam (but who may only have been consulted on the design), was subsequently extended by Rowand Anderson in the early 20th century. It was given to the City of Glasgow in 1966 by Dame Anne Maxwell Macdonald, whose family had owned the estate for almost 700 years. Pollok House was once managed by the National Trust for Scotland, on behalf of Glasgow City Council (GCC), but is now managed by GCC itself. It is currently closed to the public. The house was modernised internally in 1899 by Alexander Hunter Crawford.

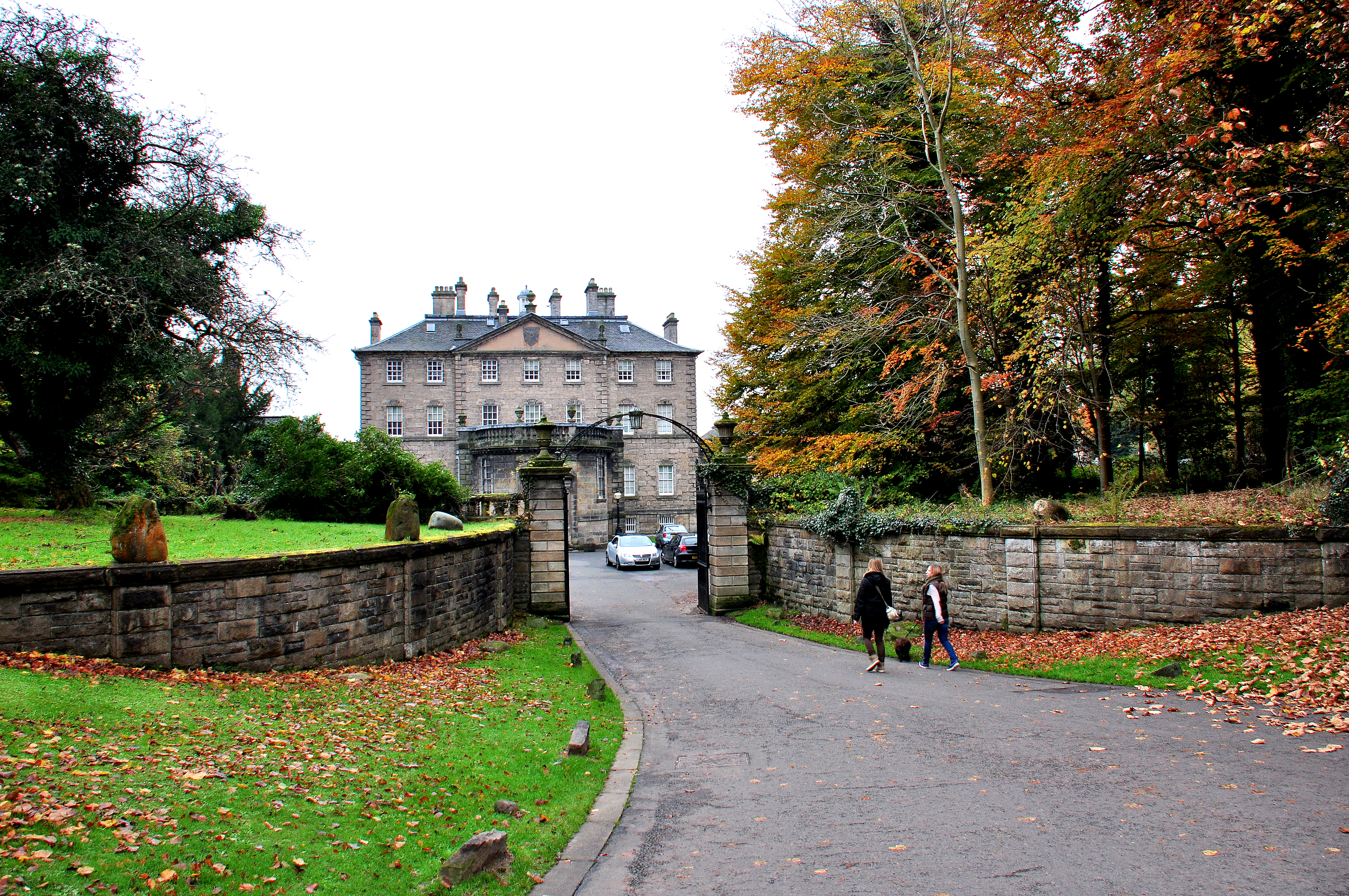
The approach to Pollok House

Displayed within Pollok House is a large, private collection of Spanish paintings, including works by El Greco, Francisco Goya, Alonso Sánchez Coello and Bartolomé Esteban Murillo. There are also paintings by Rubens and William Blake, as well as glass, silverware, porcelain and antique furniture. The house features servants' quarters downstairs (accessible free of charge), which include two shops and a restaurant.

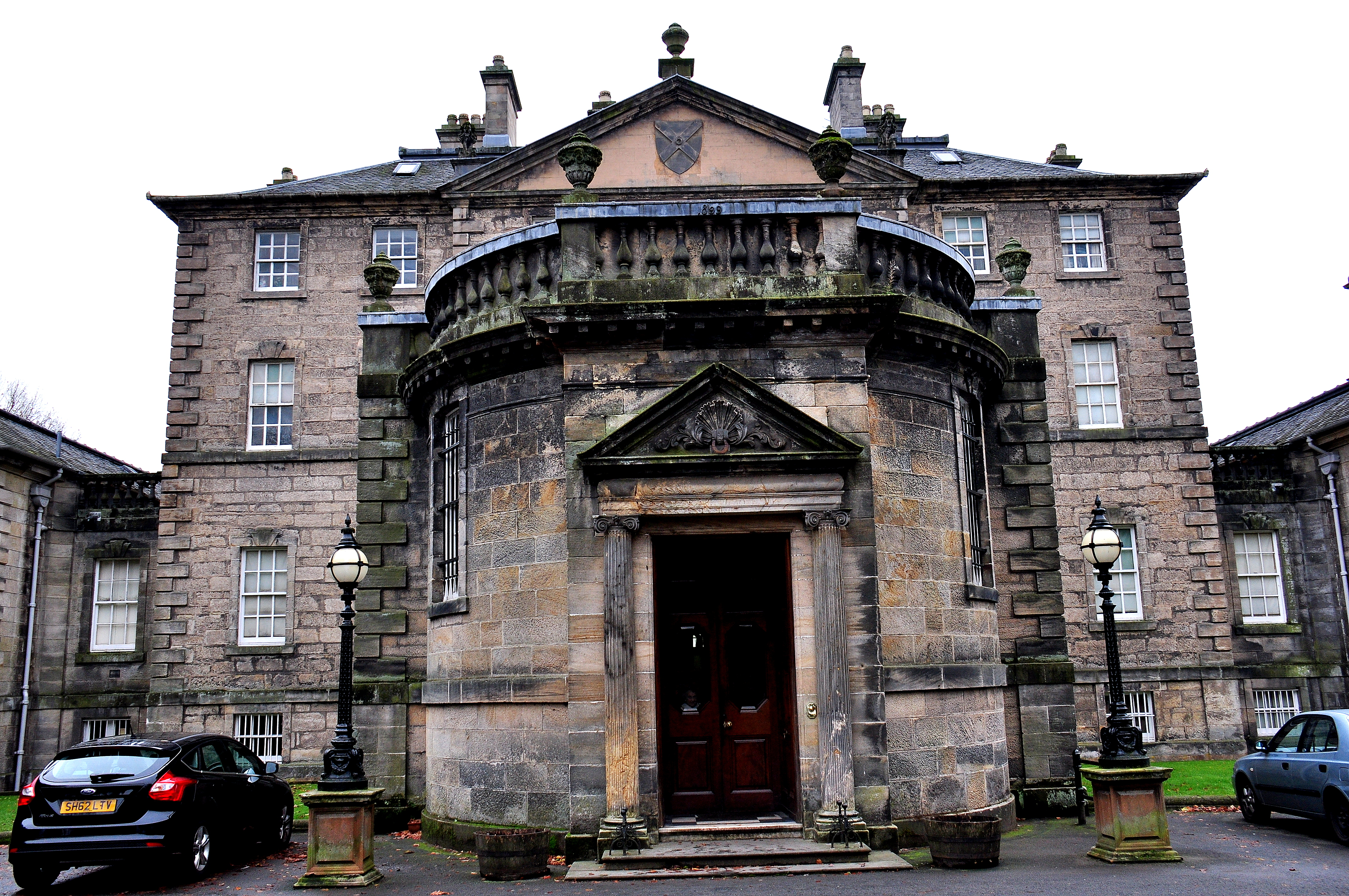
Front facade of Pollok House

The house has an extensive garden, boasting a collection of over 1,000 species of rhododendrons. The gardens behind the main house contain the Pollok Park Beech (Fagus sylvatica), which is thought to be 250 years old. This tree has an unusual form, with a swollen trunk (7 metres (23 ft) girth at grade and 10 metres (33 ft) girth at 10 metres (33 ft) height) and a gnarled mass of branches.

There is also a complex of offices, stables and a sawmill, part of which dates from the 18th century. The stone arch bridge leading to the house over the White Cart Water was constructed in 1757. The heraldic lions on the gate piers were carved by John Marshall to a design by Huw Lorimer in 1950.

In September 2023, the NTS announced that the house would close from the following November for approximately two years to allow for the second phase of a £4 million renovation project.

== The Pollok Witches ==
In 1677, a group of five women and one man were accused of attempting to murder Sir George Maxwell of Pollok, using witchcraft, causing an illness by roasting a wax image of him. The accused were Janet Mathie, Annabell Stewart, John Stewart, Bessie Weir, Marjorie Craige and Margaret Jackson. They were all "apprehendit and imprisoned as suspect guiltie of witchcraft by entering unto paction with the devill; renouncing their baptisme and committing severall malefices."

== Art collection ==
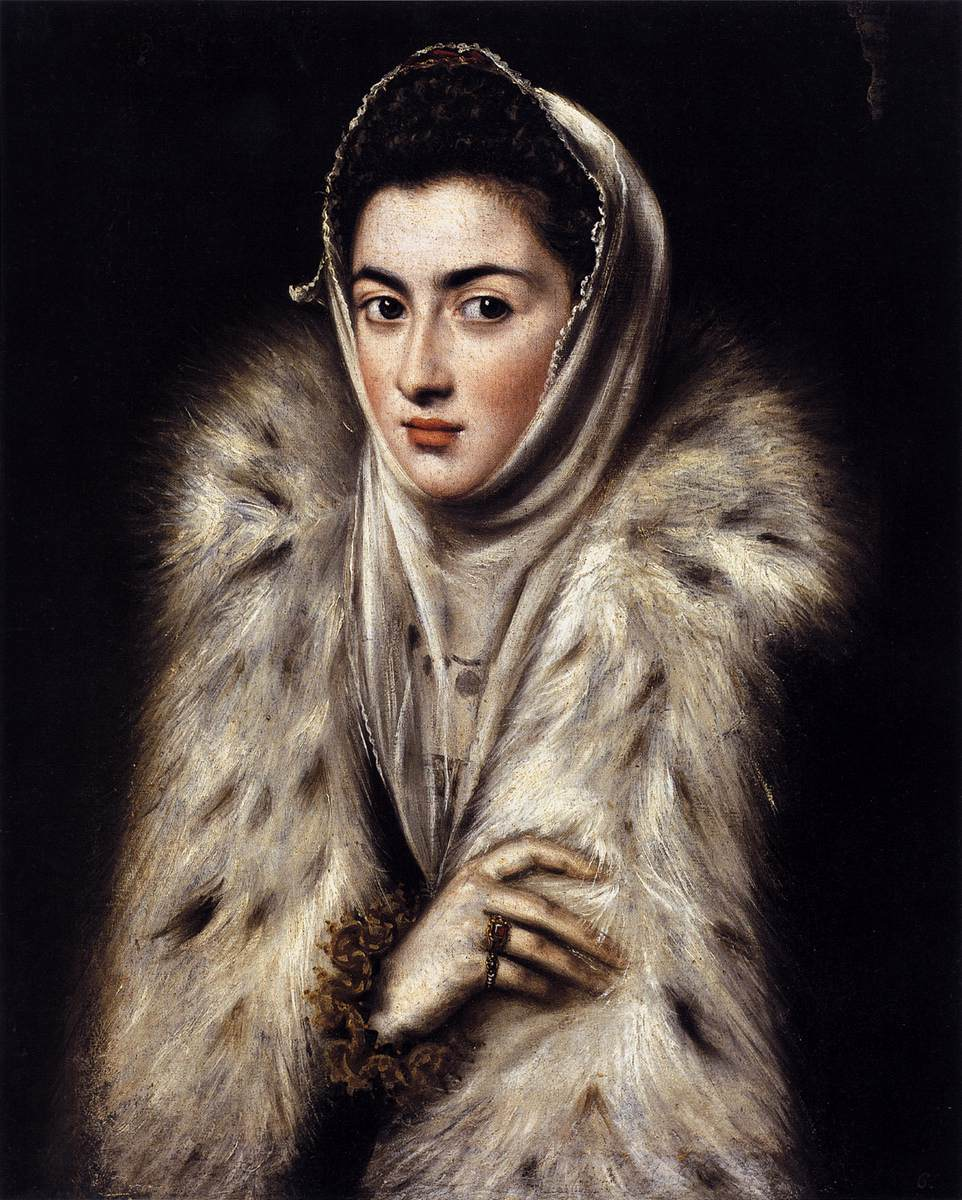
A lady in a fur wrap (Alonso Sánchez Coello)

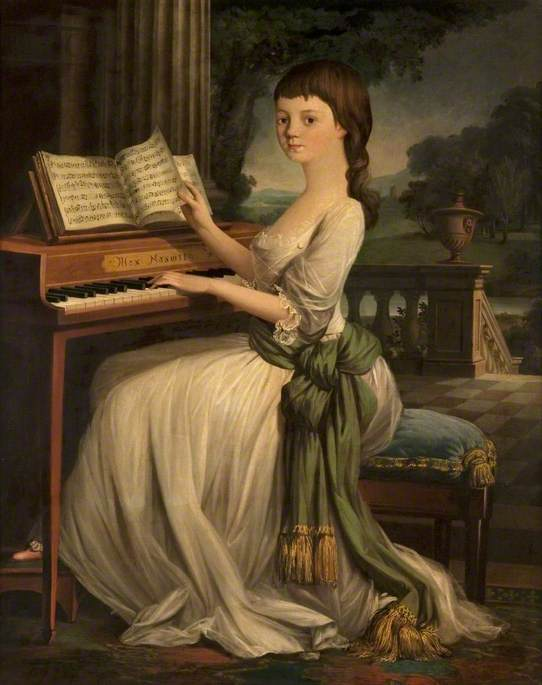
A girl at a harpsichord (Mather Brown)

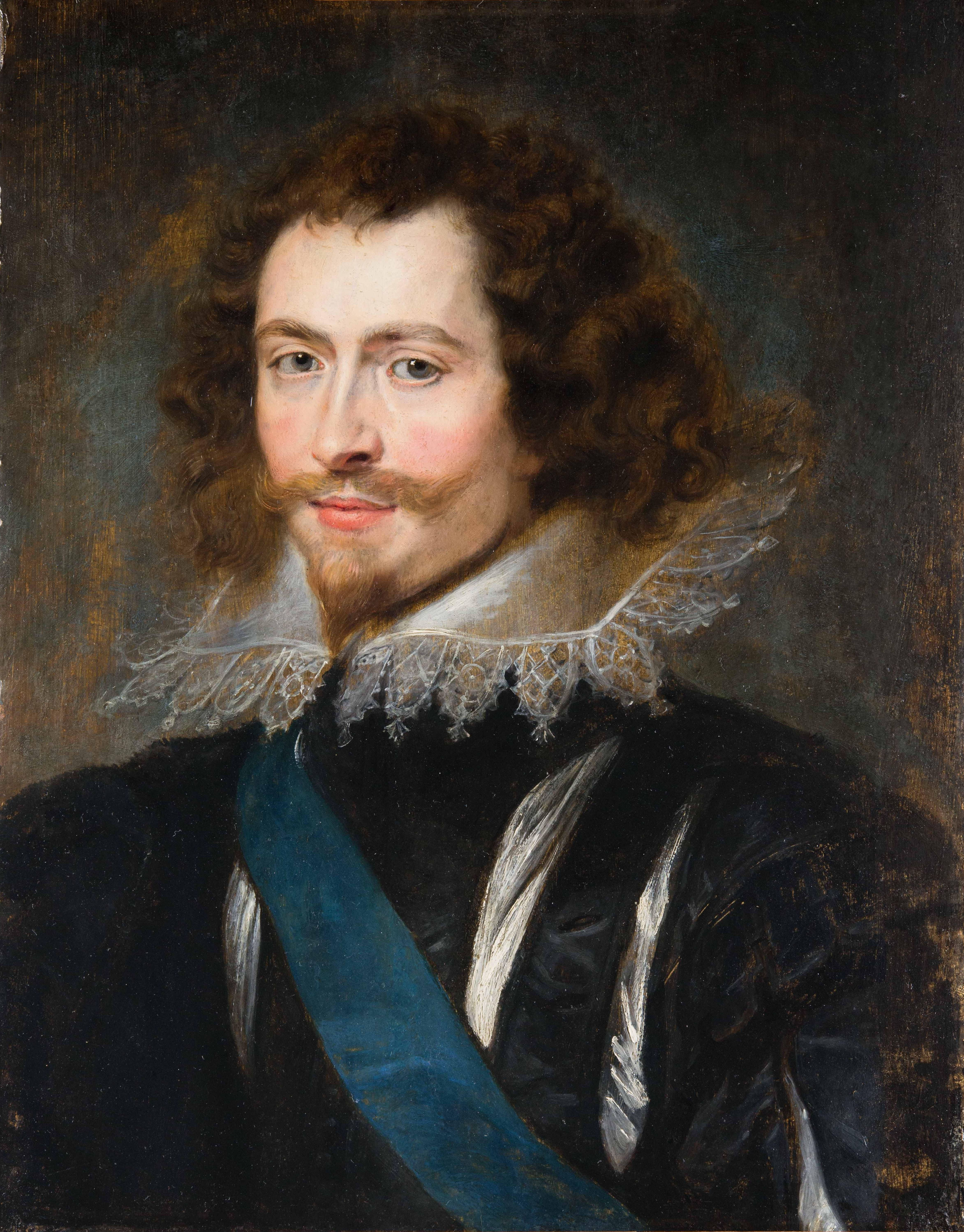
Portrait of George Villiers, 1st Duke of Buckingham (Peter Paul Rubens)

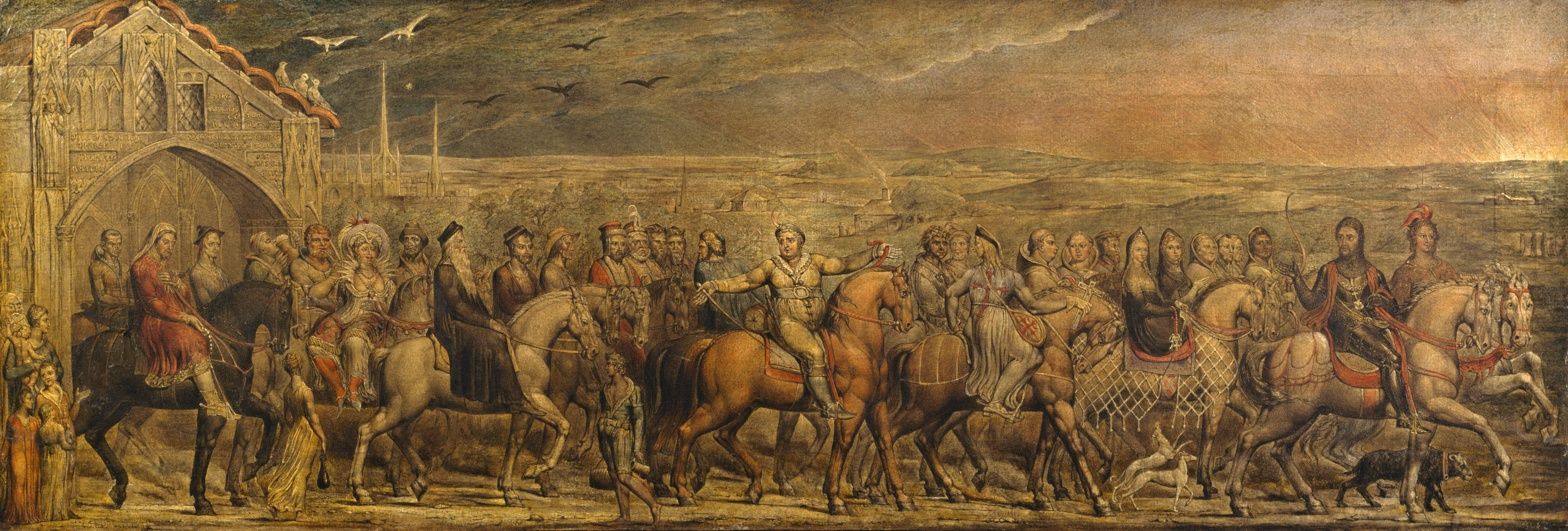
Canterbury Pilgrims (William Blake)
