= John Shackleton =

British painter (died 1767)

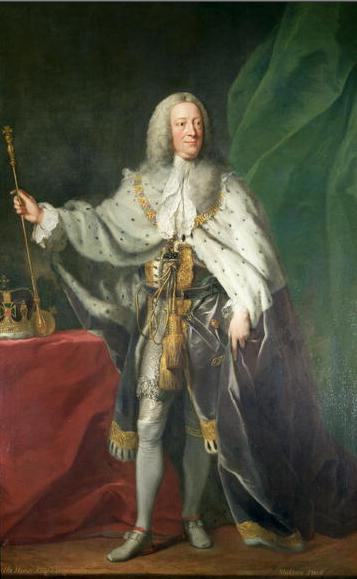
George II by John Shackleton, 1758 (Foundling Hospital) – this image was given by the artist in May 1758, in return for which he was elected a governor and guardian of the hospital

John Shackleton (died 16 March 1767) was a British painter and draughtsman who produced history paintings and portraits. His parents and origins are unknown.

== Output ==
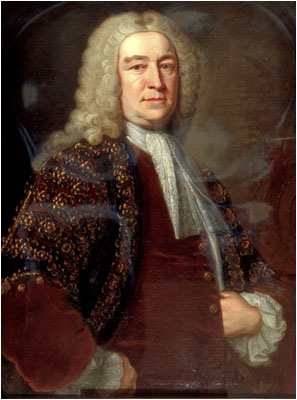
Henry Pelham, by Shackleton

Shackleton painted several surviving portraits, for example of Henry Pelham (National Portrait Gallery), William Windham (1717–1761; now at Felbrigg Hall, Norfolk), and of John Bristowe, steward to the first duke of Newcastle (now in the Reitlinger Museum of Fine Art, Maidenhead).

From 1749 he was Principal Painter in Ordinary to George II and George III. He continued to be paid for portraits of the king and queen up even during 1765–6, when their official portraits were being done by Allan Ramsay. Several examples of his and his studio's output of royal portraits survive – one of George II dated 1755 is in the Scottish National Portrait Gallery, Edinburgh; another of George II in Room 2 of the British Museum, London (commissioned by the museum in 1759 – the Museum also holds engravings after his paintings), along with two more of George II in the Royal Collection and others in Fishmongers' Hall, London, and Maidenhead Museum.

== Life ==
He was a member of the 1755 committee that drew up the first proposal for siting a royal academy in London. On 8 March 1758 he was elected to be a member of the Society for the Encouragement of Arts, Manufactures, and Commerce, then in its infancy. He exhibited at the Free Society of Artists from 1763 to 1766.

Among the legatees of his will, dated 8 March 1767, were his ‘dear friend Mrs Sarah Rice’, ‘two marble heads said to be done by Bernini to my intimate friend Mr Robt [D?]ossie of Wardour Street, Soho’, and ‘a half-length picture of a Lady by Vandyke and a small landscape by Gaspar Poussin to John Bristow Esqr Keeper of His Majesties Lions in the Tower’.

== Marriage and issue ==
On 25 October 1742 (as a parishioner of St George's, Hanover Square, London) he married Mary Ann Regnier.

== Sources ==
- J. R. Fawcett-Thompson, ‘The elusive Mr. Shackleton: light on the principal painter in ordinary to King George II and George III’, The Connoisseur, 165 (1967), 232–9
- B. Stewart and M. Cutten, The dictionary of portrait painters in Britain up to 1920 (1997), 417 · Waterhouse, 18c painters, 341
- J. Kerslake, National Portrait Gallery: early Georgian portraits, 1 (1977), 91, 93, 101, 204, 208–9
- O. Millar, The Tudor, Stuart and early Georgian pictures in the collection of her majesty the queen, 2 vols. (1963), vol. 1, 26, 150; vol. 2, nos. 567–8
- O. Millar, The later Georgian pictures in the collection of her majesty the queen, 1 (1969), xiii n.15, xli
- Horace Walpole, Anecdotes of painting in England: with some account of the principal artists, ed. James Dallaway, [rev. and enl. edn], 2 (1826), 711
- Samuel Redgrave, Artists
- John Chaloner Smith, British Mezzotinto Portraits, 1 (1878), 317; 2 (1879), 677–8
- Engraved Brit. ports., 1.245; 2.298, 456; 3.437
- B. Nicholson, The treasures of the Foundling Hospital, with a catalogue raisonné based on a draft catalogue by John Kerslake (1972), 32, 34, 50, 78, no. 74
- will, PRO, PROB 11/928, fols. 48r–49r

Court offices
Preceded by William Kent	Principal Painter in Ordinary to the King; 7 March 1749–1767	Succeeded by Allan Ramsay
