= Lost portrait of Charles Edward Stuart =

Painting by Allan Ramsay

The Lost Portrait of Charles Edward Stuart
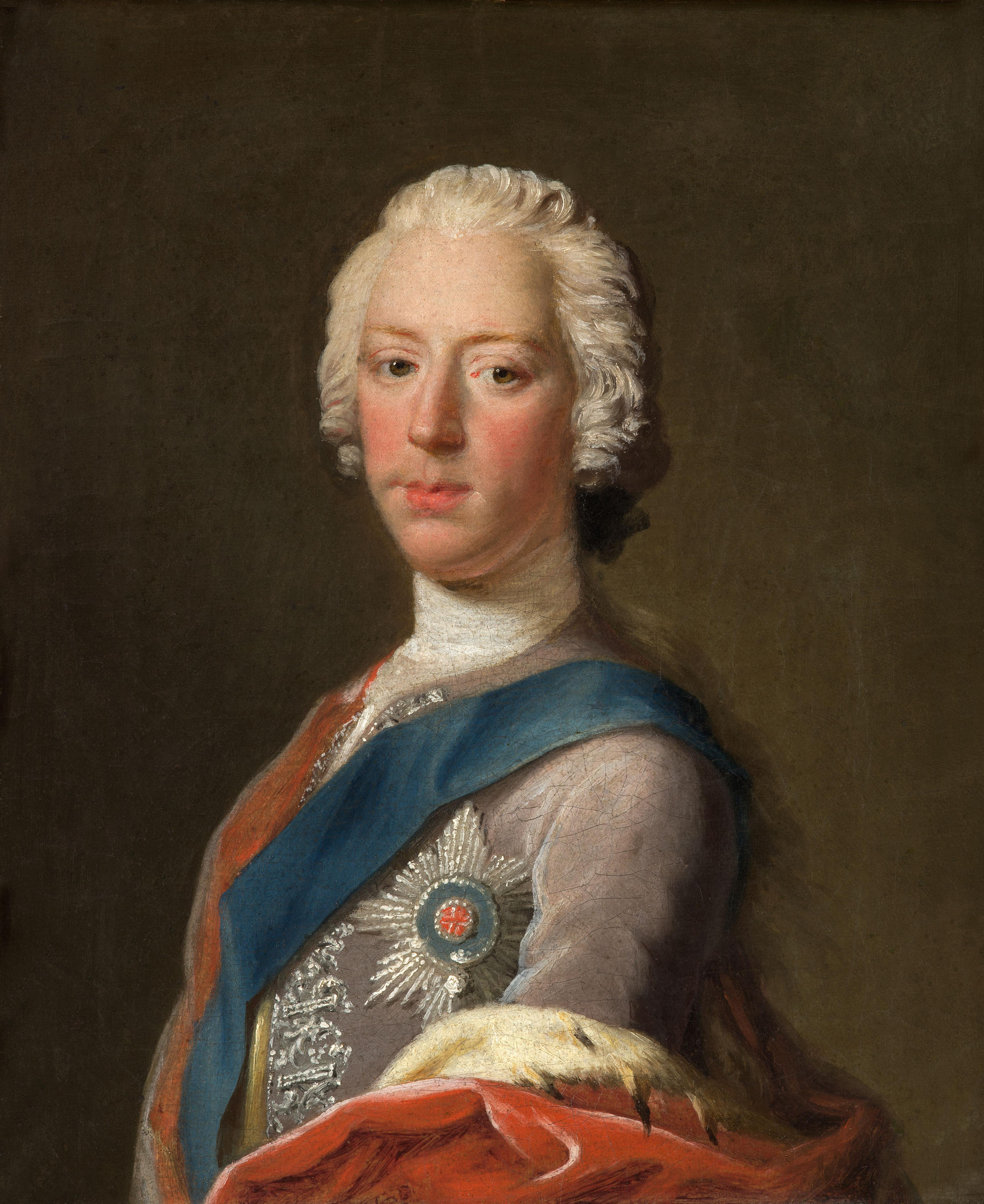
- Artist: Allan Ramsay
- Year: 1745
- Medium: Oil on canvas
- Dimensions: 30 cm × 25 cm (12 in × 10 in)
- Location: Scottish National Portrait Gallery, Edinburgh

The "lost portrait" of Charles Edward Stuart is a portrait painted in late autumn 1745 by Scottish artist Allan Ramsay, of Charles Edward Stuart, also known as the Young Pretender or Bonnie Prince Charlie.

The painting was discovered by art dealer and art historian Bendor Grosvenor at Gosford House, the home of the Earl of Wemyss near Edinburgh, and was authenticated by the Ramsay authority Duncan Thomson, former director of the Scottish National Portrait Gallery, where the painting is now held.

== Background ==
In 2009, Grosvenor revealed that the subject of the best-known portrait of Charles Edward Stuart, the 5-foot (1.5-metre) pastel by the French artist Maurice Quentin de La Tour that had been hanging in the Scottish National Portrait Gallery since 1994, was of Charles's younger brother Henry Benedict Stuart. This portrait had until then been widely reproduced and was "immortalised on countless tins of shortbread", as well as appearing in the entry for Charles in the Dictionary of National Biography and numerous book covers, postcards and souvenirs. Grosvenor said: "Bonnie Prince Charlie is one of my heroes, and I always felt bad about debunking what used to be his most famous portrait. So I'm delighted to have found the best possible replacement – a portrait painted from life on the eve of his invasion of England." Whilst attempting to find this replacement – an authentic painting of Charles from the period of the Jacobite rising of 1745 – Grosvenor discovered a letter in the Royal Archives from John Stuart, the valet to Charles, that instructed Ramsay to go to Holyrood Palace in Edinburgh to paint Charles's portrait:

Sir, you are desired to come to the Palace of Holyroodhouse as soon as possible in order to take his Royal Highness' picture. So I expect you'll wait no further call. I am, your most humble servant, John Stuart, Holyrood House 26th of October 1745.

He also found a black and white photograph of the Ramsay portrait in the records of the National Portrait Gallery in London, although the artist was not given as Ramsay. This painting was at Gosford House, the home of the Earl of Wemyss, where it had hung in increasing obscurity for 250 years in a gloomy corridor on the ground floor. The painting was known to be of Charles but it was not known that Ramsay was the artist. Ramsay authority Duncan Thomson, former director of the Scottish National Portrait Gallery, authenticated it as a work by Ramsay and said: "This portrait brings the prince back to life in a way I'd never thought imaginable. It's hard to overstate the importance of finding a portrait of the prince painted in Scotland, by a Scottish artist."

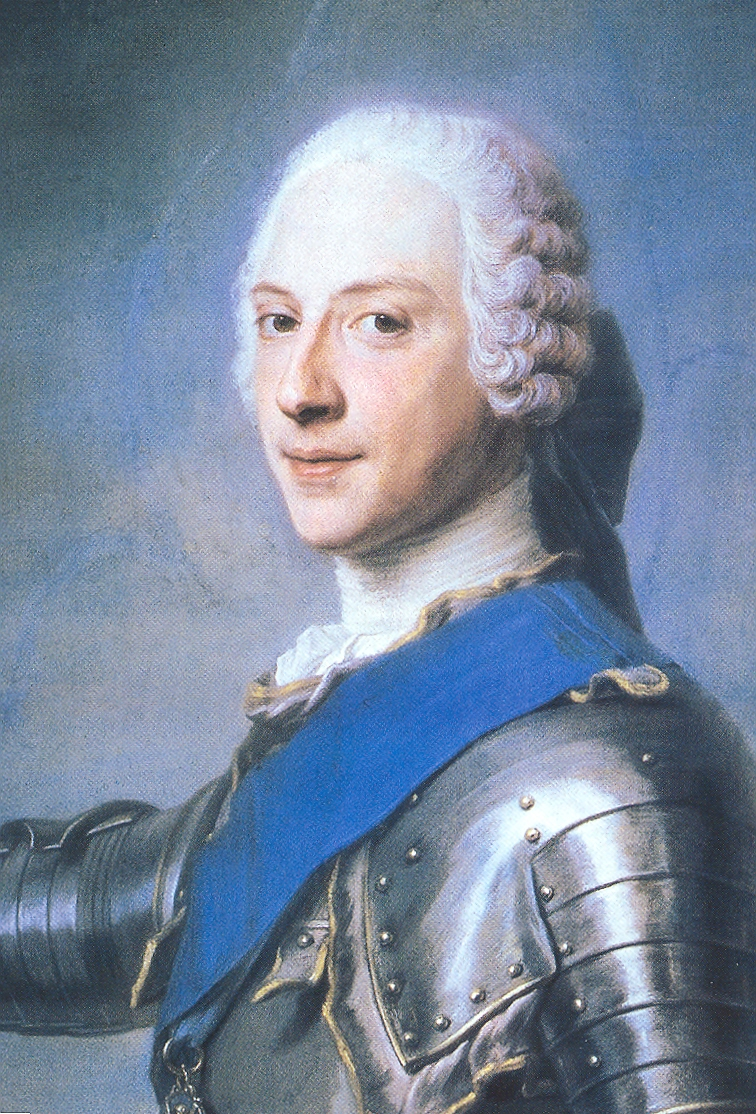
Henry Benedict Stuart, by de La Tour. This painting was thought to be of Charles Edward Stuart, until Bendor Grosvenor showed in 2009 that it was of his younger brother.

On 30 March 2016, the Scottish National Portrait Gallery announced that the painting had been acquired for the nation through the acceptance in lieu scheme, with the painting being valued at greater than £1.1 million. It was placed on display at the Scottish National Portrait Gallery just before the 270th anniversary of the Battle of Culloden.

== Painting ==
The small painting, 12 by 10 inches (30 by 25 centimetres), is the only one of Charles known to have been painted in Britain. The painting was intended to be taken to England and be both reproduced in engravings and used as the "basis for an official royal portrait" if the Jacobites succeeded in restoring the Stuarts to the throne. Christopher Baker, the director of the Scottish National Portrait Gallery, said on the painting's acquisition:

It is a little gem of a picture, almost on a miniature scale, which was likely produced on that scale because it was planned from the outset that it would be replicated as prints. It becomes the key source for an awful lot of propaganda to support the Jacobite cause, which were widely distributed, not just in Scotland, but right across Britain and Europe.

== BBC programme ==
The story of Grosvenor's research into and discovery of the painting was the subject of a BBC documentary titled The Lost Portrait of Bonnie Prince Charlie, which was broadcast on BBC Two on 22 February 2014.
