= Michael Foye =

Irish sculptor

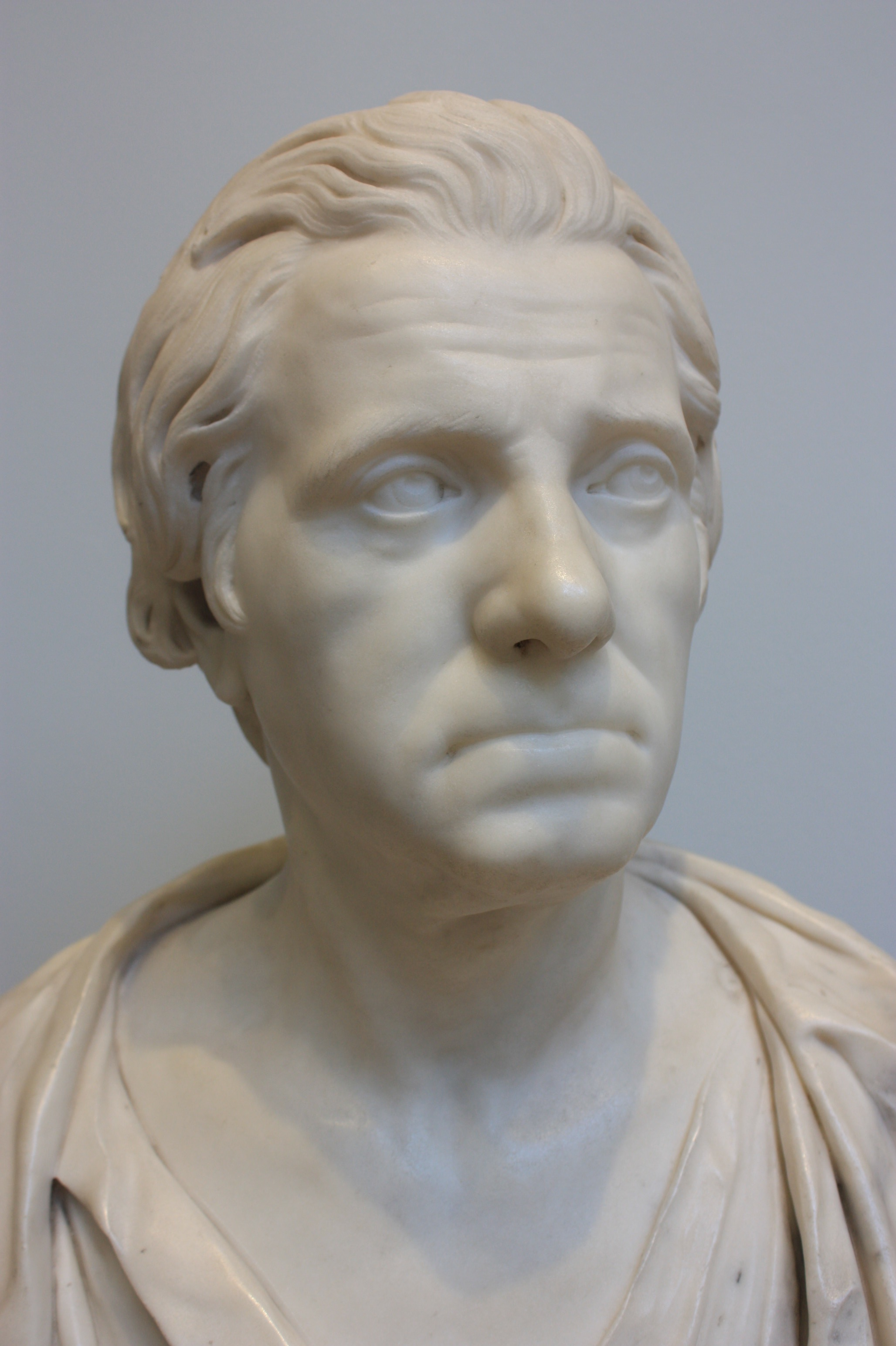
Allan Ramsay in old age by Michael Foye, 1776

Michael Foye (also spelled as Michael Foy) was an eighteenth-century Irish sculptor. He is believed to have died in Rome around 1777.

== Early career ==
His name first appeared in Dublin in the year 1765 when he exhibited two works at the Dublin Society of Artists on William Street: "Venus and Cupid" in marble and "Group of Boys" in plaster. In 1768, he presented "Mercury instructing Cupid" and in 1770 "Hercules Resting from his Labours". By 1769, he was working in the studio of John Nost III (nephew of the Dutch sculptor John Nost), who had come to Dublin in 1750.

== Grand tour ==
In 1772, Foye undertook his grand tour and travelled to Italy, arriving in Florence in April. In early 1773, he moved to Rome (living first in Strada dei Greci and then in Via Babuino). In 1773, he was mentioned by the English sculptor Thomas Banks, during Banks' own grand tour, as working on a sculpture of "Apollo del Belvedere" in marble. In November 1776, the Welsh painter, Thomas Jones, mentioned a joint meeting in the Cafe degli Inglesi between himself, Foye, Thomas Banks, Christopher Hewetson and Nathaniel Marchant.

== Busts ==
In 1777, Foye sent "Bust of an Artist" to the Society of Artists in London, which is generally thought to be the bust of Allan Ramsay, now held in the Scottish National Portrait Gallery. A second bust, originally believed to be of Sir William Hamilton (largely remembered now as the husband of Emma, Lady Hamilton), was later identified as Captain Sir John Lindsay. Lindsay was Ramsay's brother-in-law.

His only other known work is a carved relief of the artist James Durno which appeared in the sale of Thomas Banks' possessions in 1805.
