= Portrait of David Hume =

Painting by Allan Ramsay

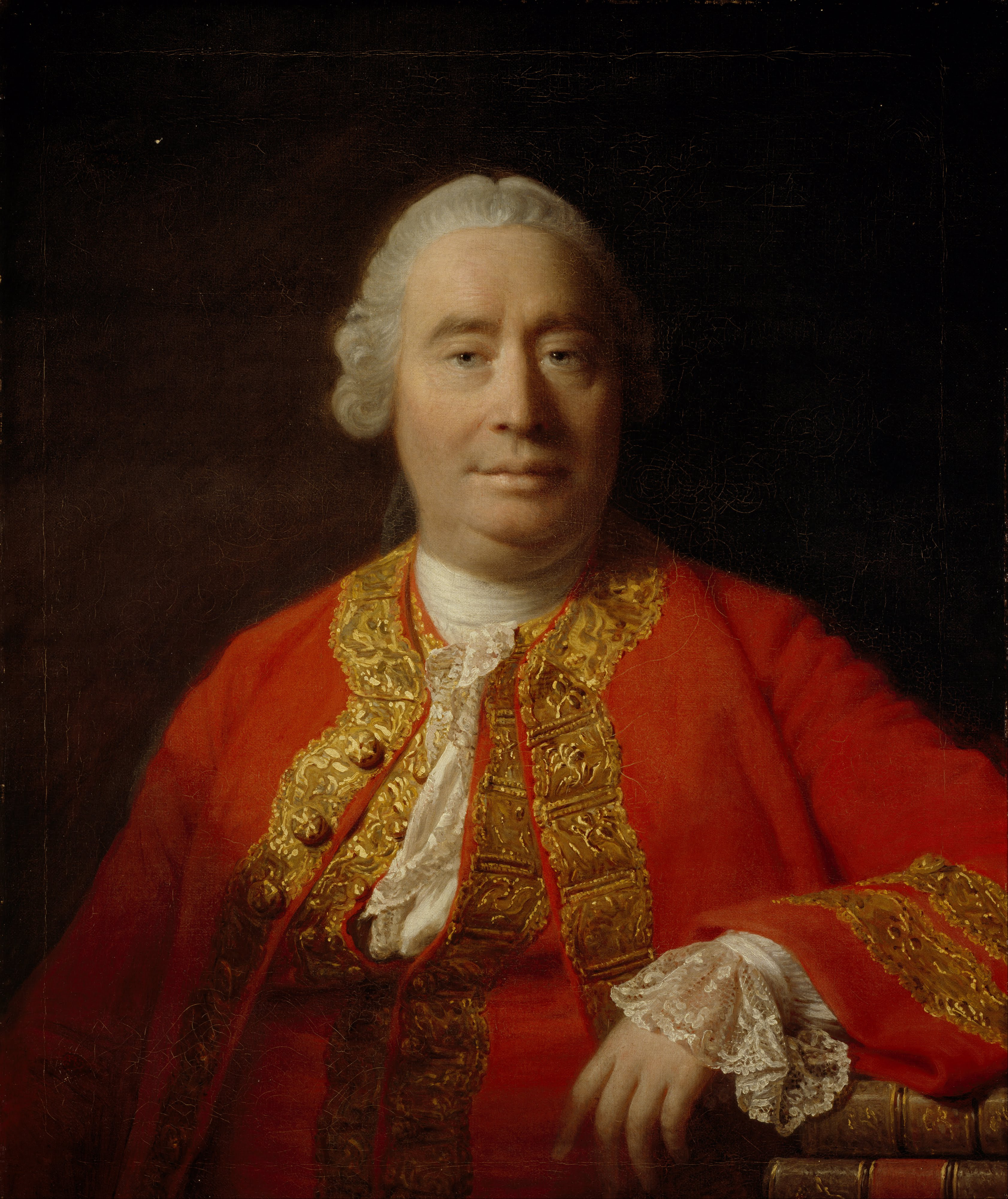
- Artist: Allan Ramsay
- Year: 1766
- Type: Oil on canvas, portrait painting
- Dimensions: 76.2 cm × 63.5 cm (30.0 in × 25.0 in)
- Location: Scottish National Portrait Gallery; Edinburgh

Portrait of David Hume is a 1766 portrait painting by the British artist Allan Ramsay. It depicts the historian and philosopher David Hume, a key figure in the Scottish Enlightenment. The two men had a long connection as founders of The Select Society and Hume had consulted Ramsay on the first volume of his The History of England. The Scottish-born Ramsay was a leading portraitist of the Georgian era. He enjoyed notable patronage from George III and painted a number of portraits of the Royal Family, and had previously painted Hume in 1754.

In 1765 Hume had been serving as the chargé d'affaires at the British Embassy in Paris. He returned to London the following year where he was accompanied by Jean-Jacques Rousseau. They both sat to Ramsay for portraits intended as a companion pieces. A mezzotint based on the picture of Hume, produced by Ramsay's former pupil David Martin, was displayed at the Exhibition of 1767 held by the Society of Artists in London. Today the painting is in the collection of the Scottish National Portrait Gallery in Edinburgh.

== Bibliography ==
- O'Donnell, C. Oliver. Portraits of Empiricism: Art Histories from an Intellectual Tradition. Penn State University Press, 2006.
- Smart, Alastair. Allan Ramsay, 1713-1784. Scottish National Portrait Gallery, 1992.
