= Principal Painter in Ordinary =

First Court painter in Great Britain

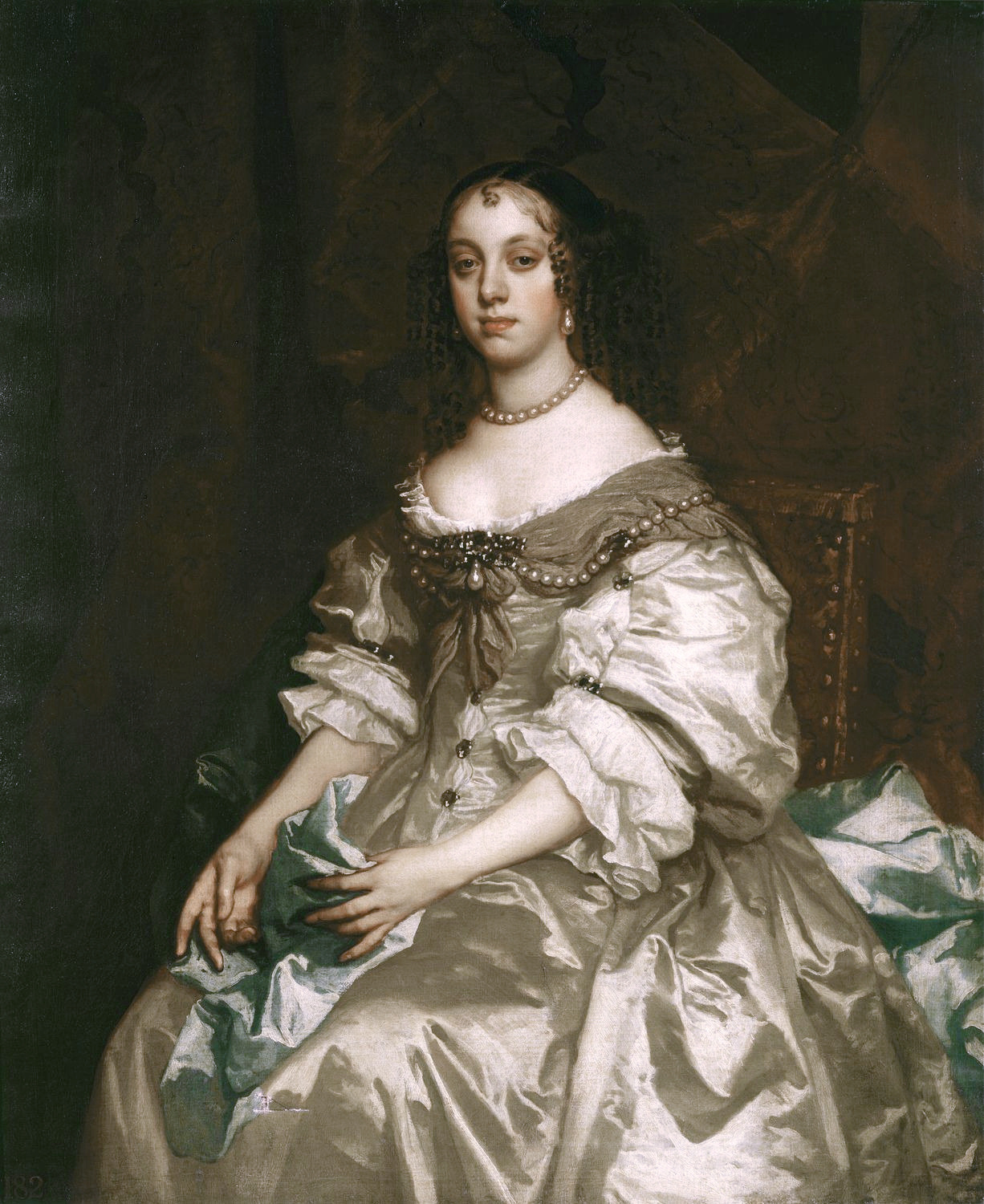
Catherine of Braganza, Charles II's queen, by Sir Peter Lely, 1663-65. Portraits were the main output of the Principal Painters.

The title of Principal Painter in Ordinary to the King or Queen of England or, later, Great Britain, was awarded to a number of artists, nearly all mainly portraitists. It was different from the role of Serjeant Painter, and similar to the earlier role of "King's Painter". Other painters, for example Nicholas Hilliard had similar roles with different titles. "Principal Painter in Ordinary", first used for Sir Anthony van Dyck, became settled as the usual title with John Riley in 1689.

The title reflected those used in other courts, especially the French Premier peintre du Roi, which dated to 1603. After the death of Queen Victoria in 1901, the appointment of the last and not very distinguished holder, James Sant, who was in his eighties, was not renewed for the new reign.

The following is a partial list of painters (in chronological order) who held the appointment of Principal Painter in Ordinary to the King, or Queen:

== Born 16th or 17th century ==
- Sir Anthony van Dyck (Flemish, 1599–1641), Principalle Paynter in Ordinary to King Charles I and his Queen (1632, at a £200 per annum retainer, plus payment for pictures made)
- Sir Peter Lely (Dutch, 1618–1680), Limner and Picture Drawer to King Charles II (1661, also £200 per annum)
- John Riley (1646–1691), Painter and Picture Drawer, 1681–1689, then Principal Painter in Ordinary, 1689–1691, jointly with Kneller
- Antonio Verrio (Italian, 1636–1707), Chief First Painter, 1684–1688
- Sir Godfrey Kneller (German, 1646–1723), Principal Painter in Ordinary to the King, 1689–1723 (1689–1691 jointly with Riley)
- Charles Jervas (1675–1739), Principal Painter in Ordinary to the King, 1723–1739
- William Kent (1685–1748), Principal Painter in Ordinary to the King, 1740–1748, mainly a designer of interior decorations

== Born 18th century ==
- John Shackleton (1714–1767), Principal Painter in Ordinary to King George II and then King George III, 1749–1767
- Allan Ramsay (1713–1784), Principal Painter in Ordinary to the King, 1767–1784
- Sir Joshua Reynolds (1723–1792), Principal Painter in Ordinary to the King, 1784–1792
- Sir Thomas Lawrence (1760–1830), Principal Painter in Ordinary to the King, 1792–1830
- Sir David Wilkie (1785–1841), Principal Painter in Ordinary to King William IV and then Queen Victoria, 1830–1841
- Sir George Hayter (1792–1871), Principal Painter in Ordinary to Queen Victoria, 1841–1871

== Born 19th century ==
- James Sant (1820–1916), Principal Painter in Ordinary to Queen Victoria, 1871–1901

== Similar titles ==
Van Dyck's appointment, like that of Kneller, was specifically to both the king and queen, but later ones normally only mentioned the monarch. Queen consorts sometimes made their own appointments. In 1796, when Lawrence was Principal Painter in Ordinary to the King, William Beechey was "Portraitist" to Queen Charlotte, and also John Hoppner was "Portrait Painter to the Prince of Wales", having succeeded Sir Joshua Reynolds. Other occasional positions created included the "Flower Painter in Ordinary" (during the reigns of Queen Adelaide and Queen Victoria), "Miniature Painter in Ordinary", and "Marine Painter in Ordinary" (Queen Victoria). Sir Francis Bourgeois was appointed as royal landscape painter by George III in 1791. His Majesty's Painter and Limner is part of the Royal Household in Scotland.

== Self-portrait gallery ==
=== See also: Self-portraiture ===
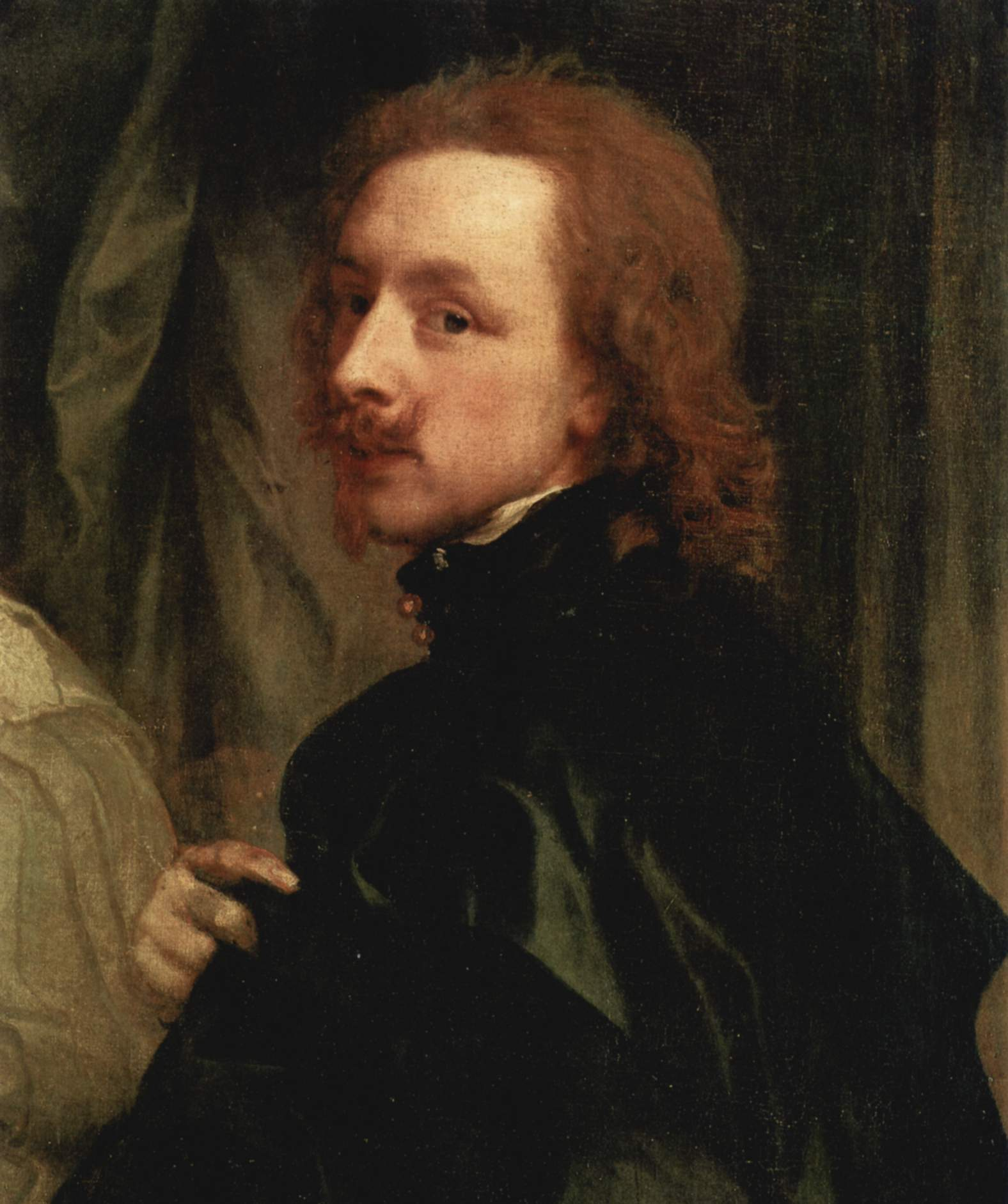
Self portrait of Sir Anthony van Dyck (1623)

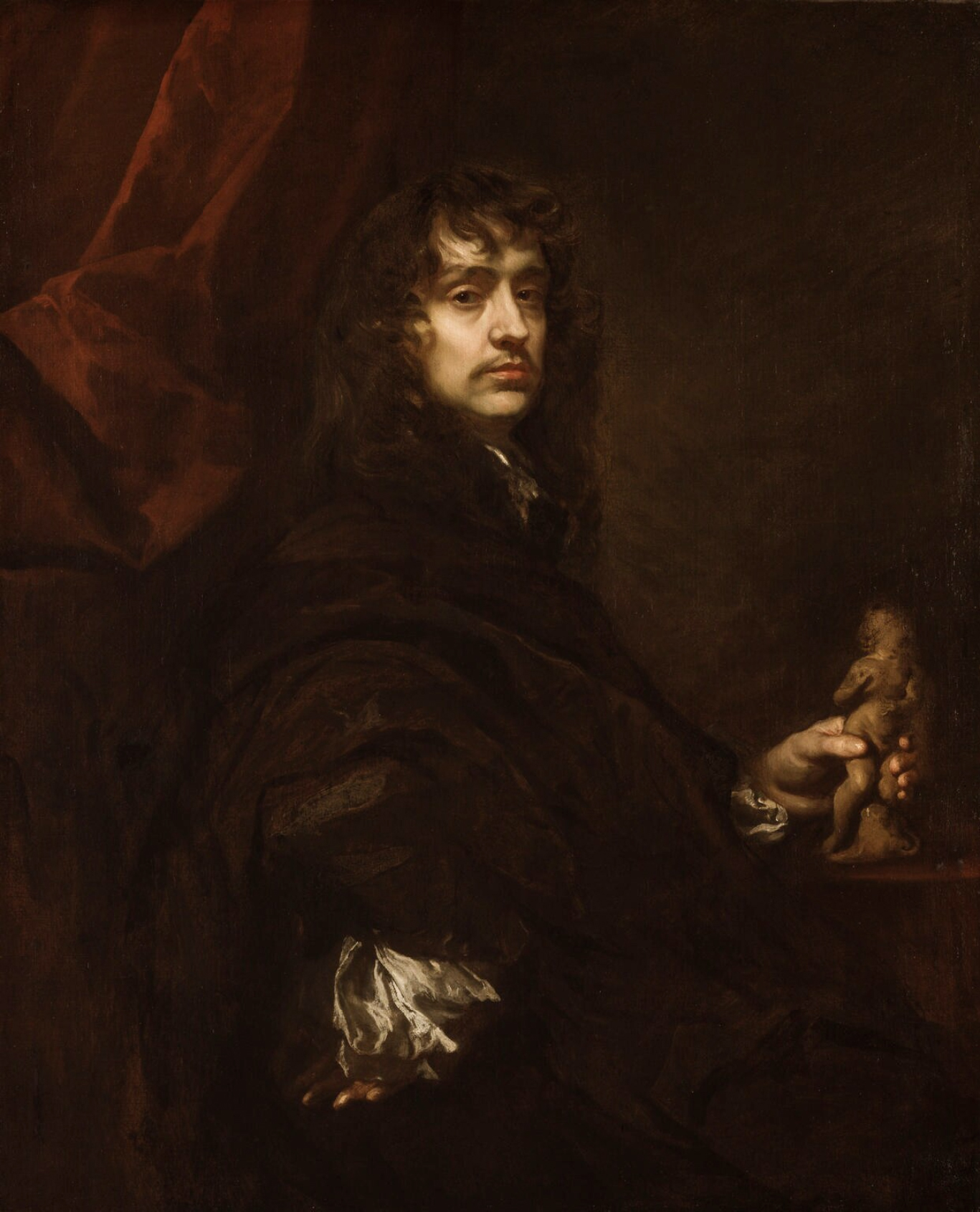
Sir Peter Lely self-portrait (1660)

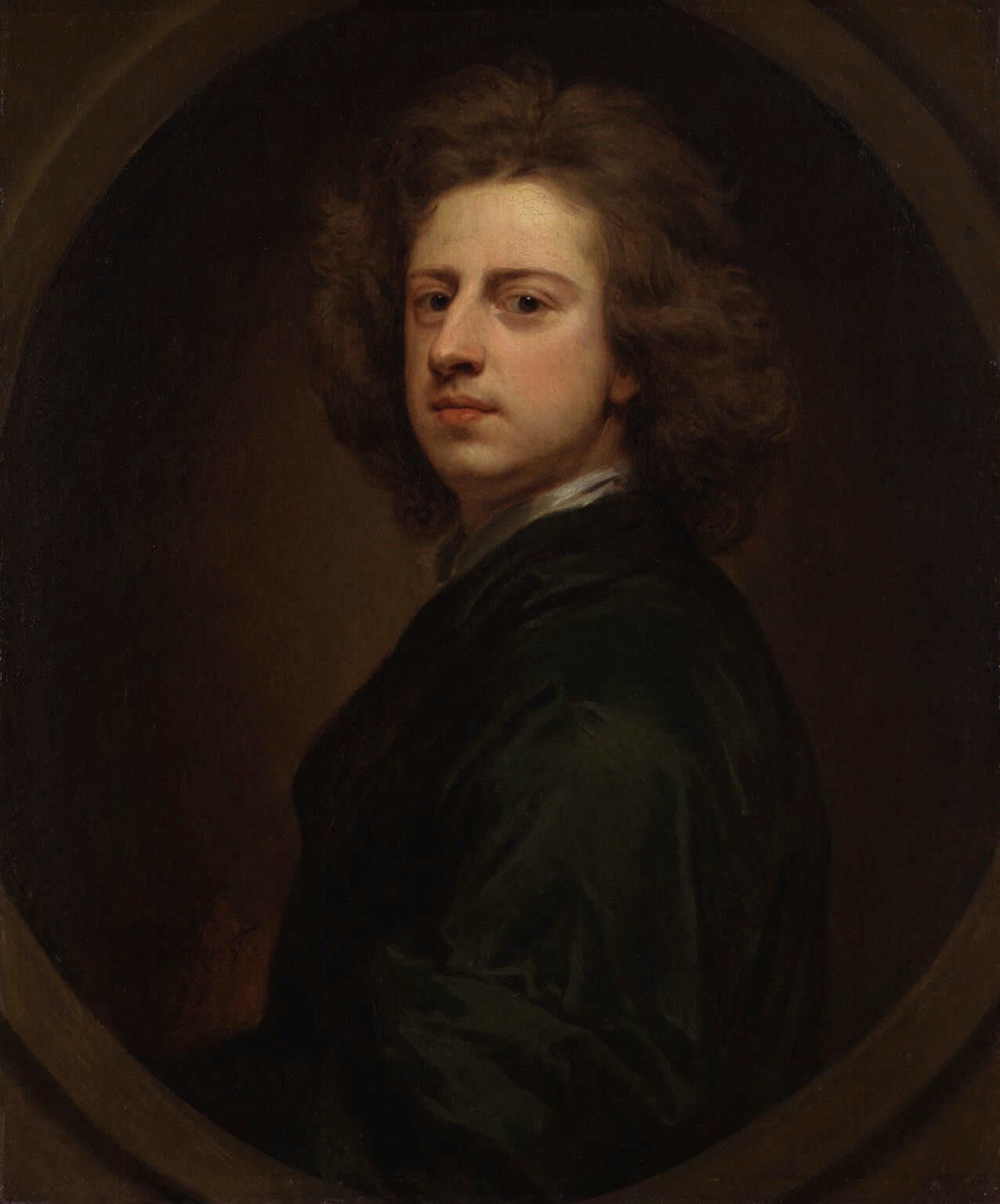
Self Portrait of Sir Godfrey Kneller (1685)

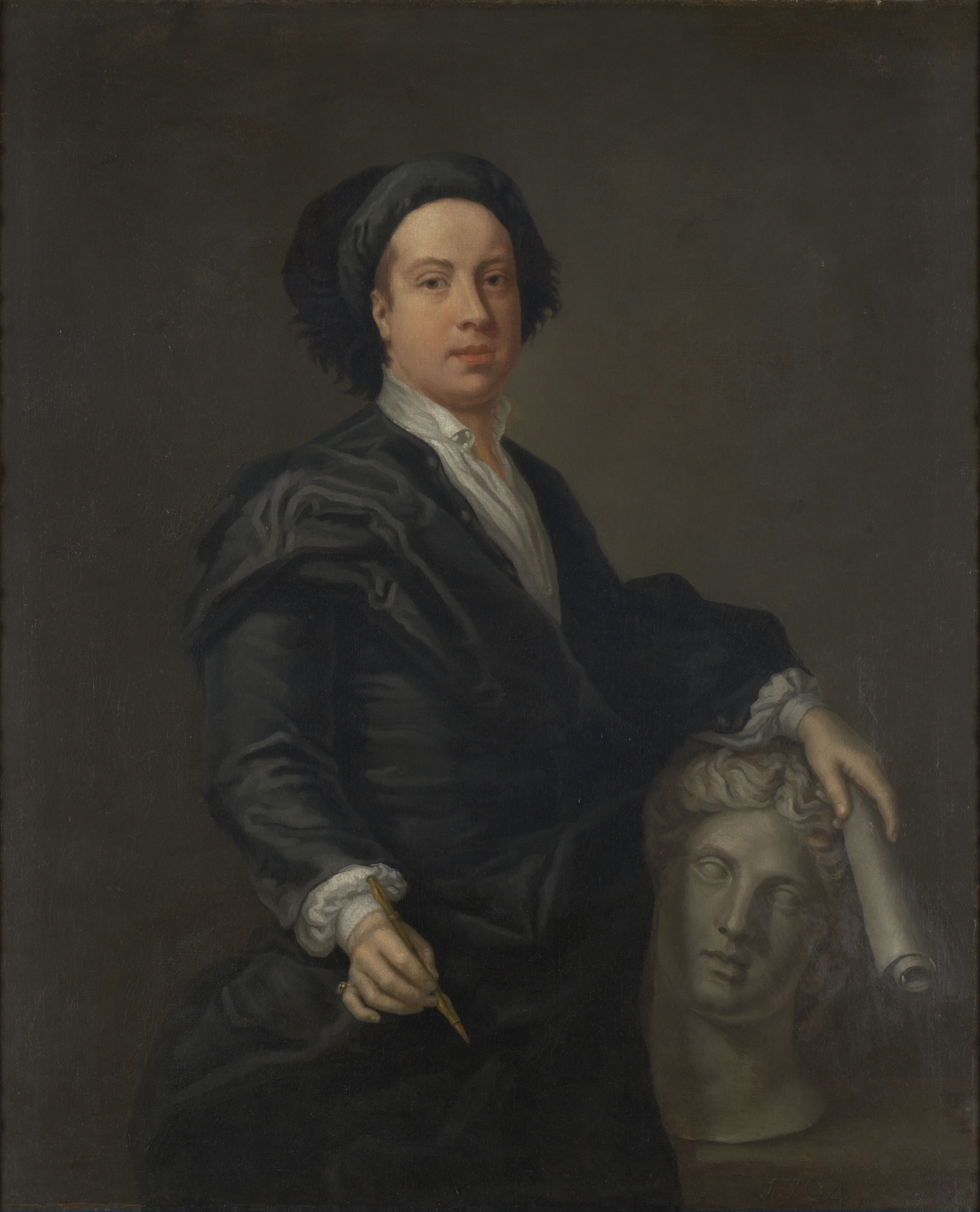
Self portrait of William Kent

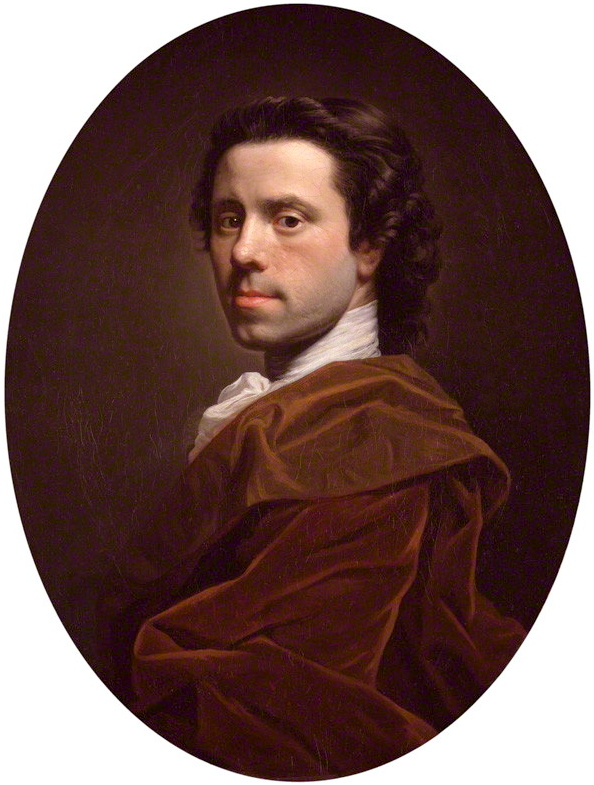
Self portrait of Allan Ramsay (1737)

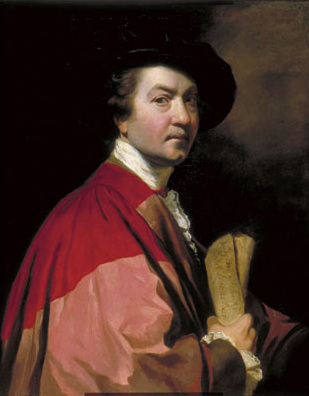
Self portrait of Sir Joshua Reynolds (1776)

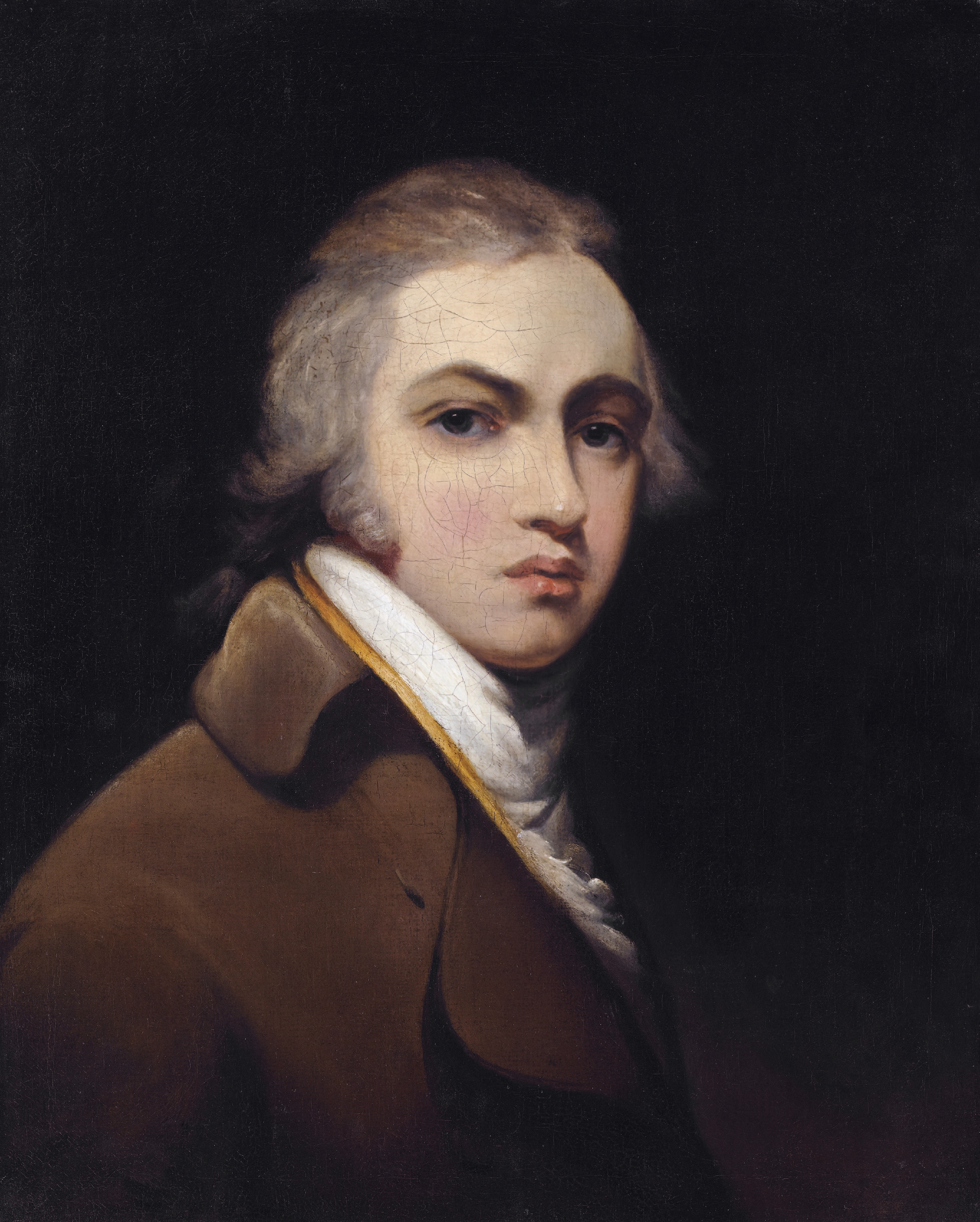
Self portrait of Sir Thomas Lawrence

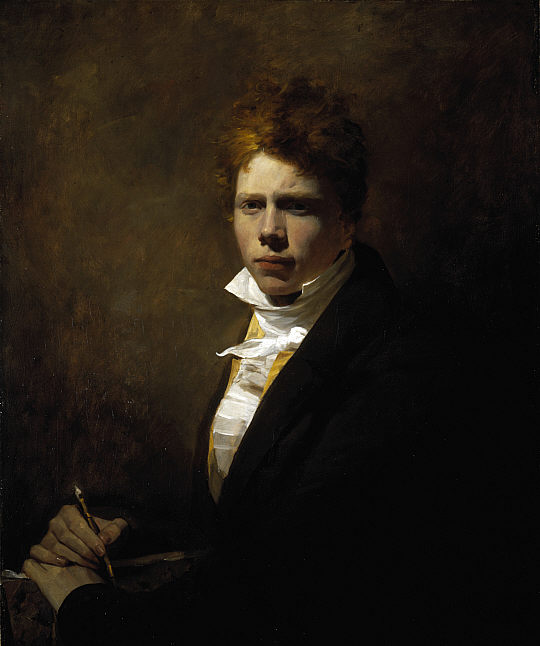
Self portrait of Sir David Wilkie

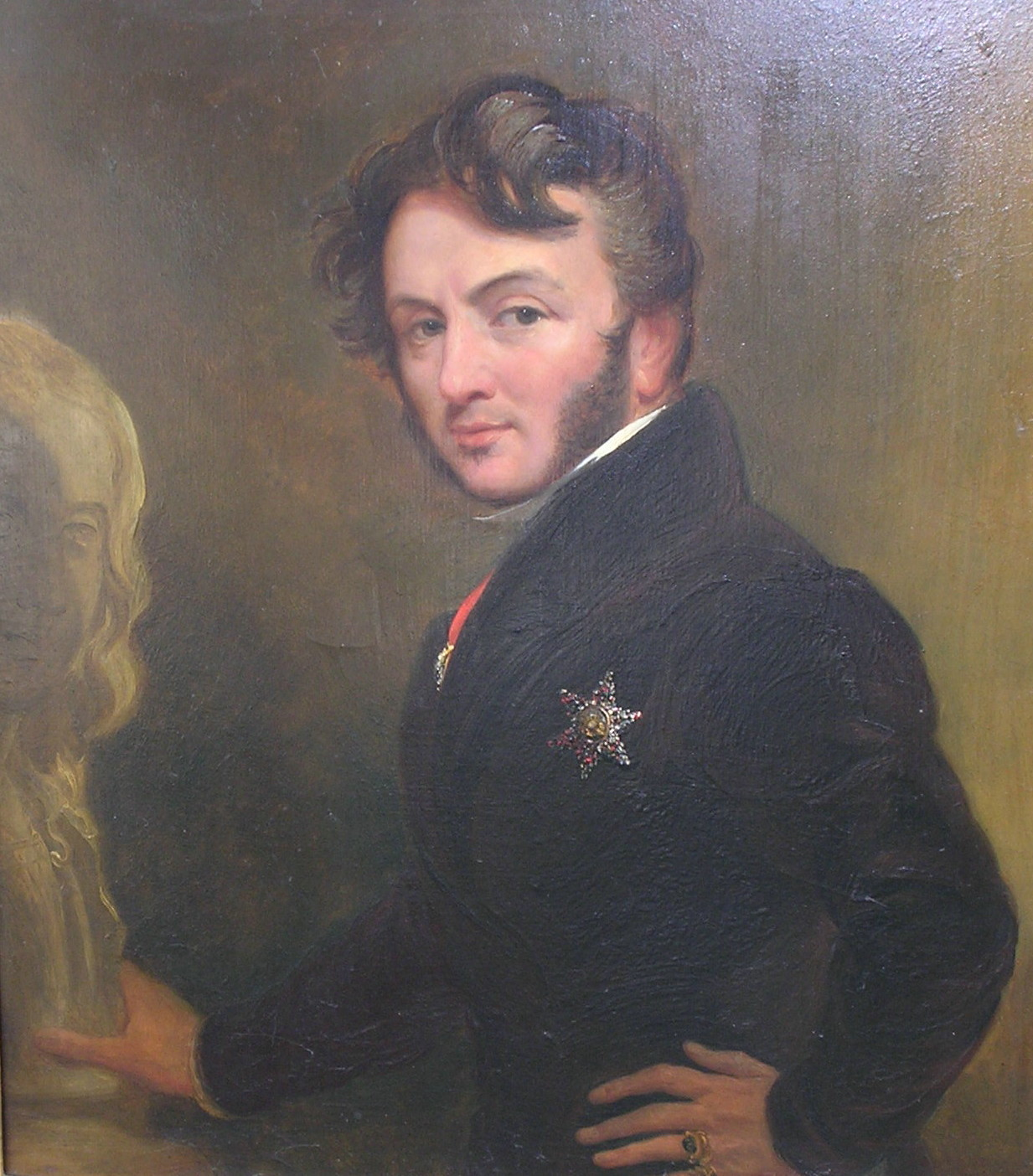
Self Portrait of Sir George Hayter (1843)

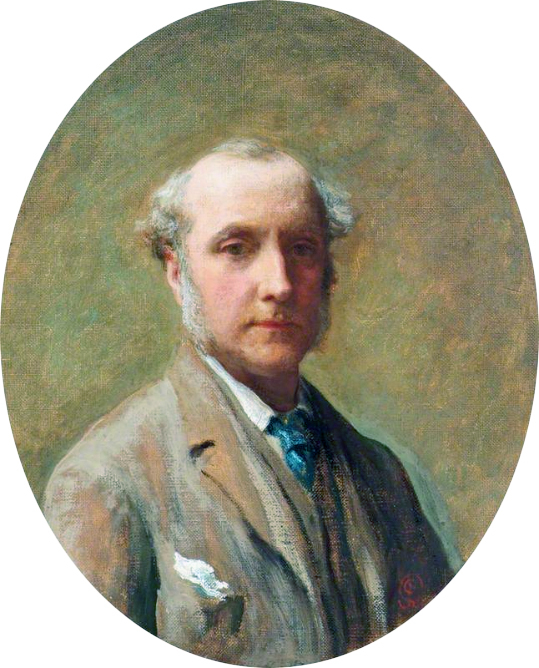
Self Portrait of James Sant (1884)
