= Allan Ramsay (artist) =

Scottish painter (1713–1784)

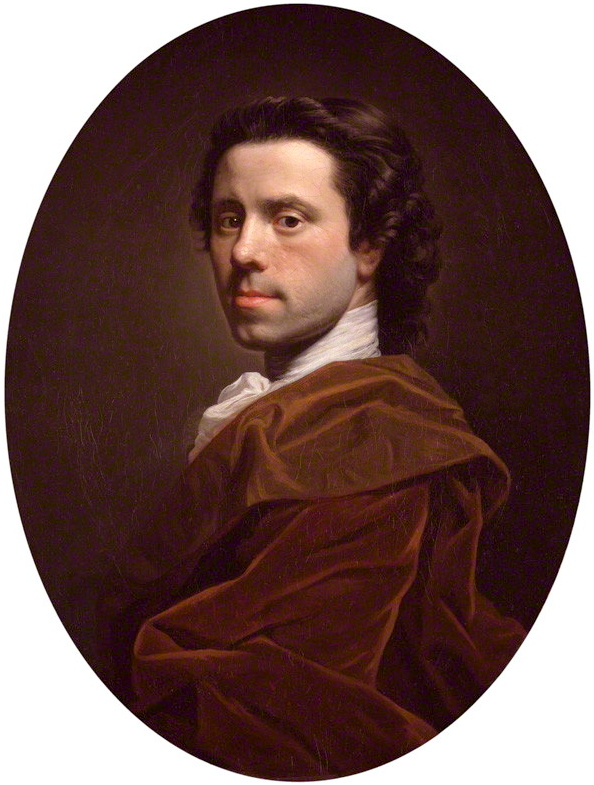
- Self-portrait, c. 1737
- Born: 13 October 1713; Edinburgh, Scotland
- Died: 10 August 1784 (aged 70); Dover, Kent
- Education: London (1733–36, under Hans Huyssing, and at the St. Martin's Lane Academy); Rome (1736–9, under Francesco Solimena and Francesco Fernandi)
- Known for: Portraiture
- Movement: Classicism
- Patrons: Duncan Forbes, Francis Egerton, 3rd Duke of Bridgewater, George III

Allan Ramsay (13 October 1713 – 10 August 1784) was a Scottish painter who specialised in portrait painting.

== Life and career ==
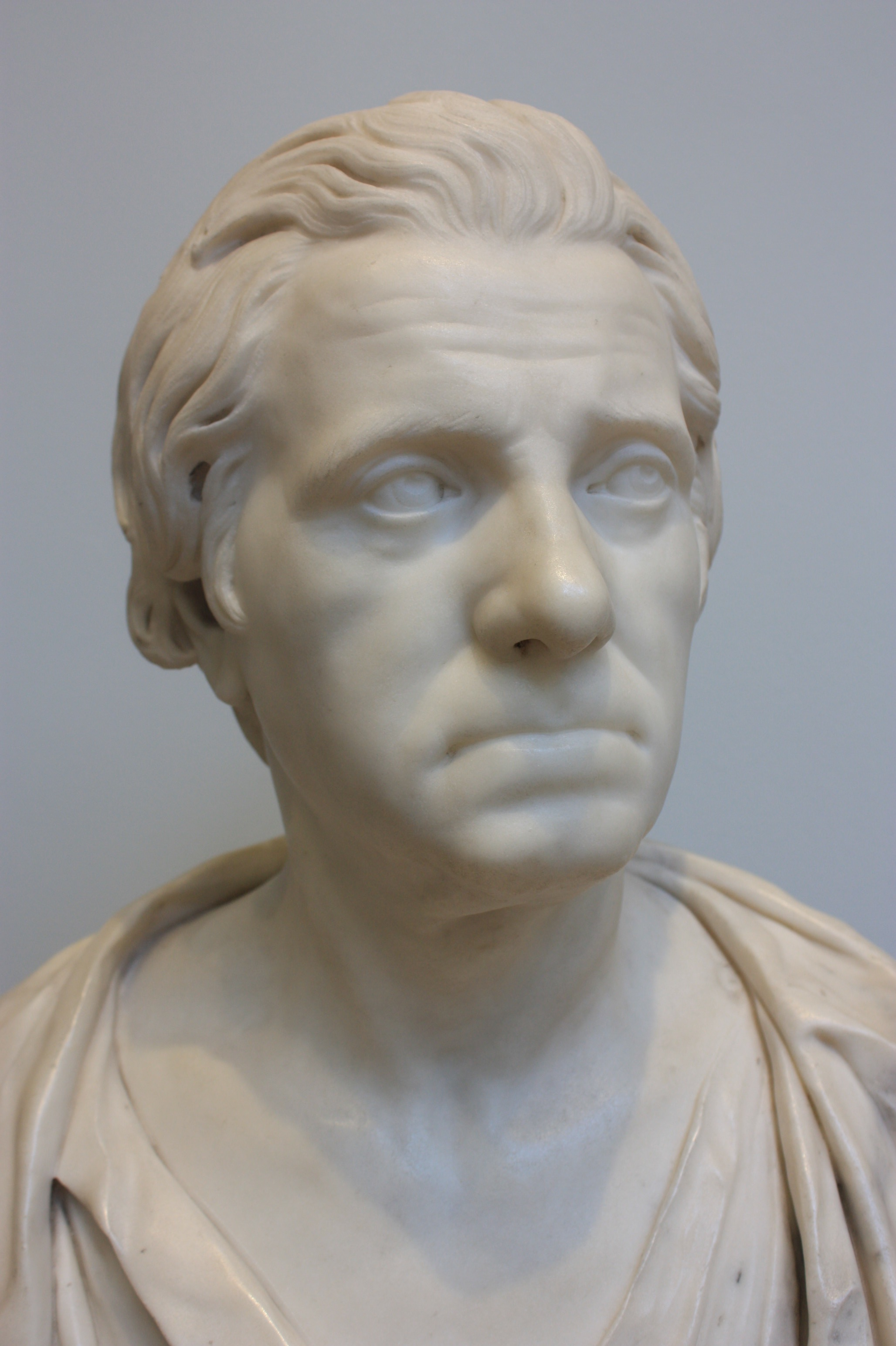
Allan Ramsay in old age by Michael Foye 1776

Ramsay was born on 13 October 1712, in Edinburgh, Scotland, the eldest son of Allan Ramsay, poet and author of The Gentle Shepherd. From the age of 20, he studied in London under the Swedish painter Hans Hysing, and at the St. Martin's Lane Academy; leaving in 1736 for Rome and Naples. In Rome, he enrolled as a day student at the French Academy and worked for three years under Francesco Solimena and Imperiali (Francesco Fernandi).

On his return in 1738 to the British Isles, he first settled in Edinburgh, attracting attention by his head of Duncan Forbes of Culloden and his full-length portrait of Archibald Campbell, 3rd Duke of Argyll, later used on Royal Bank of Scotland banknotes. He later moved to London, where he was employed by Francis Egerton, 3rd Duke of Bridgewater.

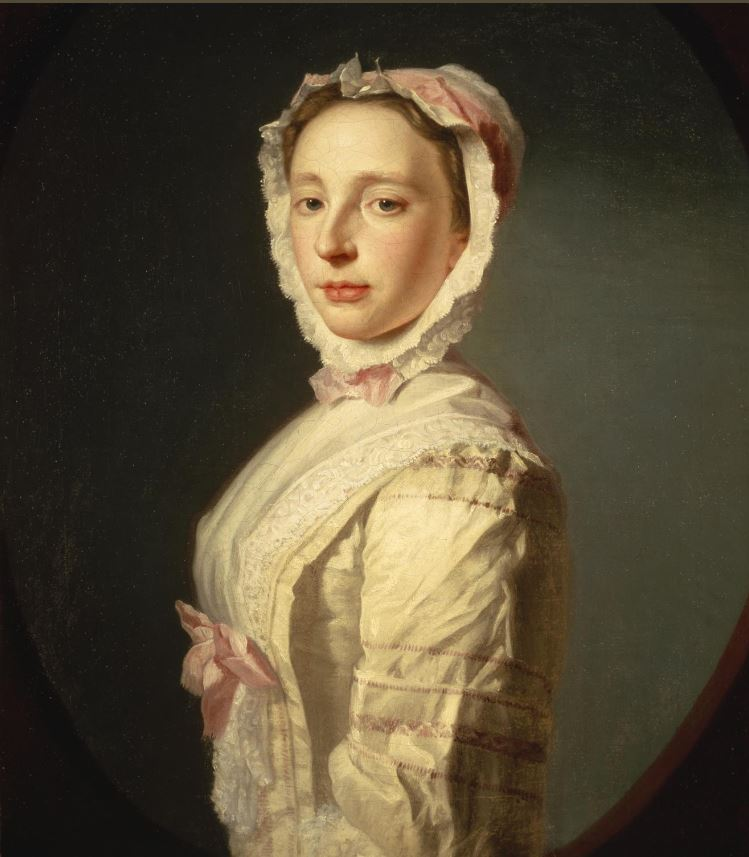
First wife Anne Bayne, painted by Ramsay

He gained recognition in London for both his artistic work and his social connections. Another prominent portrait painter of the period was Thomas Hudson, with whom Ramsay shared a drapery painter, Joseph Van Aken.

In 1739, he married his first wife, Anne Bayne, the daughter of Alexander Bayne of Rires (c. 1684–1737), and Mary Carstairs (1695?–1759). Anne died on 4 February 1743, giving birth to their third child; none of their children reached adulthood.

One of his drawing pupils was Margaret Lindsay, eldest daughter of Sir Alexander Lindsay of Evelick and Amelia Murray (granddaughter of David Murray, 5th Viscount of Stormont and sister to the naval officer John Lindsay). He later eloped with her and on 1 March 1752 they married in the Canongate Kirk, Edinburgh; her father disapproved of the marriage with an artist. Ramsay already had to maintain a daughter from his previous marriage and his two surviving sisters, but told Sir Alexander that he could provide Margaret with an annual income of £100. He said it would increase "as my affairs increase, and I thank God, they are in a way of increasing" and that his only motive for the marriage was "my love for your Daughter, who, I am sensible, is entitled to much more than ever I shall have to bestow upon her". Three children survived from their long marriage, Amelia (1755–1813), Charlotte (1758–1818?), and John (1768–1845).

Ramsay and his new wife spent 1754 to 1757 together in Italy, going to Rome, Florence, Naples and Tivoli, researching, painting and drawing old masters, antiquities and archaeological sites. He used the material of blue paper as a support. He earned income painting Grand Tourists' portraits. During these trips to Italy, Ramsay also pursued literary and antiquarian research in addition to his artistic work. After their return, Ramsay in 1761 was appointed to succeed John Shackleton as Principal Painter in Ordinary to George III, beating Hudson to the post. The King commissioned so many royal portraits to be given to ambassadors and colonial governors, that Ramsay used the services of numerous assistants—of whom David Martin and Philip Reinagle are the best known.

He gave up painting in about 1770 to concentrate on literary pursuits. His health was shattered by an accidental dislocation of the right arm and his second wife's death in 1782. Despite ill health, he continued working until he had completed a portrait of the King upon which he was engaged at the time, and then started for Italy. He left a series of 50 royal portraits to be completed by his assistant Reinagle. For several years he lingered in the south and died at Dover on 10 August 1784, aged 70.

Ramsay was a friend of Samuel Johnson's, who said of him: "I love Ramsay. You will not find a man in whose conversation there is more instruction, more information, and more elegance, than in Ramsay's."

== Art ==
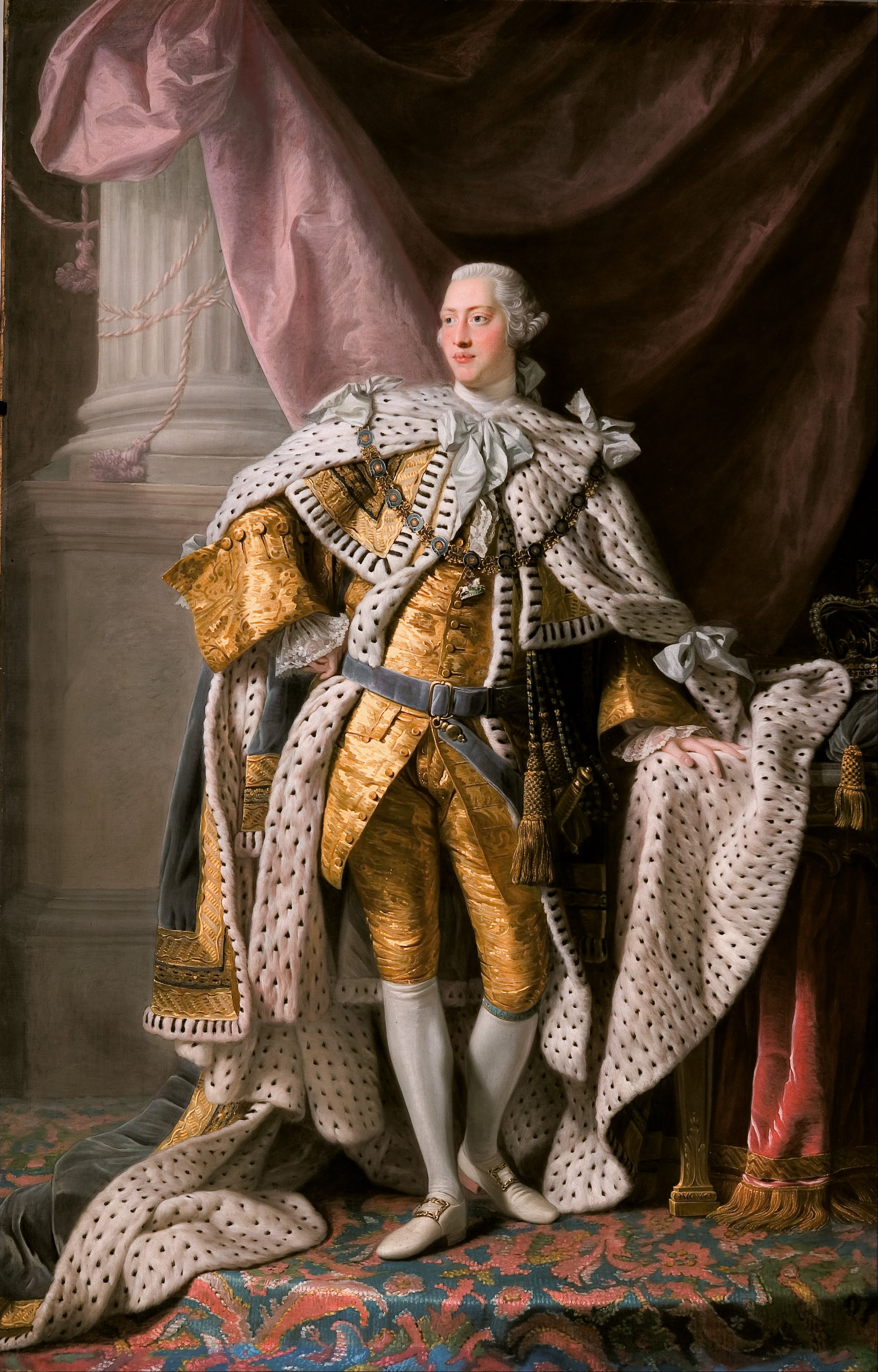
Coronation Portrait of George III, c. 1762

Among his most satisfactory productions are some of his earlier ones, such as the full-length of the Duke of Argyll, and the numerous bust-portraits of Scottish gentlemen and their ladies which he executed before settling in London. They are full of both grace and individuality. Art historians have noted the precise draughtsmanship and the technical qualities of his flesh-painting. His full-length of Lady Mary Coke has been noted for the treatment of its white satin drapery; while the portrait of his brown-eyed second wife Margaret, in the National Gallery of Scotland, is described as having a sweetness and tenderness. The portrait of his wife also shows the influence of French art, which Ramsay incorporated into his work. The large collection of his sketches in the possession of the Royal Scottish Academy and the Board of Trustees, Edinburgh also reflect stylistic influences associated with French art of the period.

A 2014 BBC documentary proposed that Ramsay was the artist who painted the lost portrait of Charles Edward Stuart.

== Paintings ==
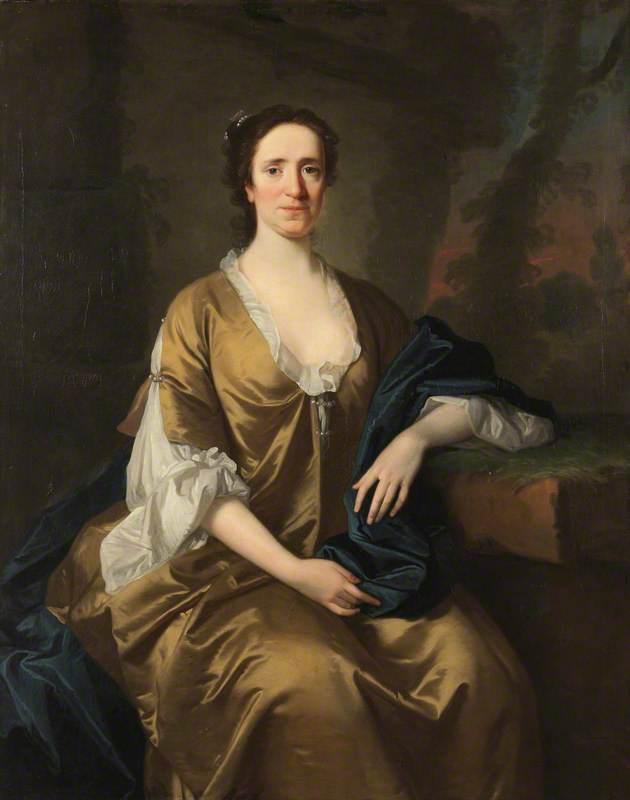
Portrait of Lady Anne Rushout by Ramsay.

Ramsay has paintings in the collection of a few British institutions including the National Gallery in London, Sheffield, Derby Museum and Art Gallery (attributed), Glasgow Museum and Newstead Abbey.

In 2016, a portrait of Richard Mead (King George II's physician) by Ramsay was discovered by Bendor Grosvenor (using the Art UK website) as part of the British BBC Four television programme Britain's Lost Masterpieces; conservation treatment was carried out by Simon Rollo Gillespie to repair the torn canvas and remove layers of discoloured varnishes.

One of the most famous paintings attributed to Ramsay was titled Portrait of an African and has attracted extensive attention across recent decades, both as a representation of a Black man in 18th century Britain, but also for the difficulty of identifying the sitter. A documentary that features this painting, exploring the many meanings of its enigmatic image, has been produced by Royal Albert Memorial Museum & Art Gallery in Exeter. The portrait was renamed Portrait of a Man in a Red Suit in 2023, and it has been noted that the painting's true artist is unknown.

== Theory ==
In 1755, Ramsay made a considerable contribution to the Greco-Roman controversy, which was mainly discussed in Paris and Rome, when he anonymously published his Dialogue on Taste, in which he named Greece as the superior source of artistic excellence.

== Abolitionism and paintings of Queen Charlotte ==
According to Mario de Valdes y Cocom in 2009, on an edition of PBS Frontline, in several paintings of Queen Charlotte, Ramsay deliberately emphasised "mulatto features" which the Queen supposedly inherited via descent from a 13th-century Moorish ancestor. Valdes suggests that copies of these paintings were sent to the colonies to be used by abolitionists as a de facto support for their cause.

Other historians question whether the 13th-century ancestor, referred to in various places as a "Moor" and Berber, was black African. In any event, they contend that the connection, nine and 15 generations removed, was too distant to consider Charlotte "black" in any way, as her other ancestors were all European.

== Gallery ==
Allan Ramsay's works

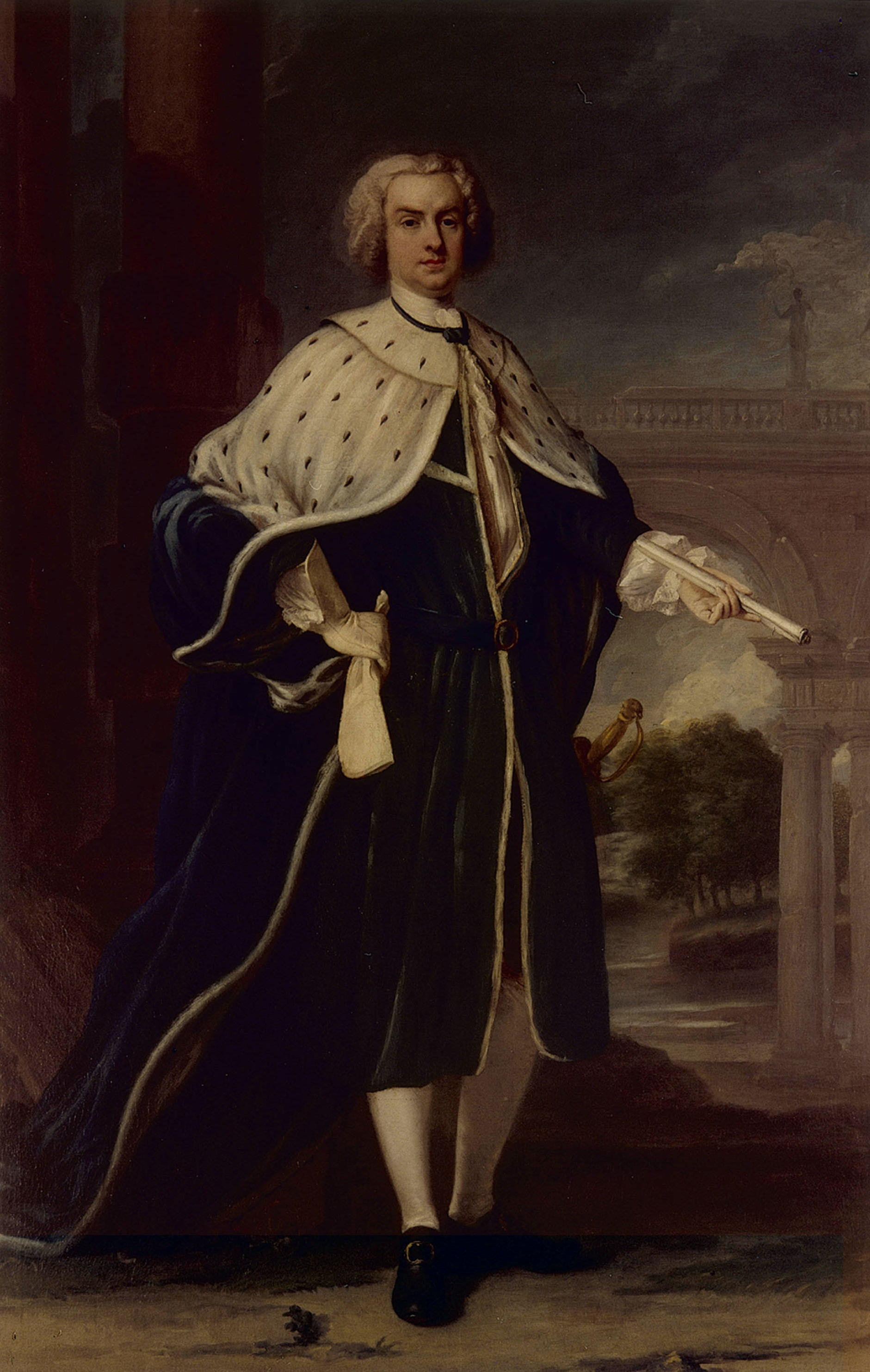
Charles Calvert, 5th Baron Baltimore (c. 1740)

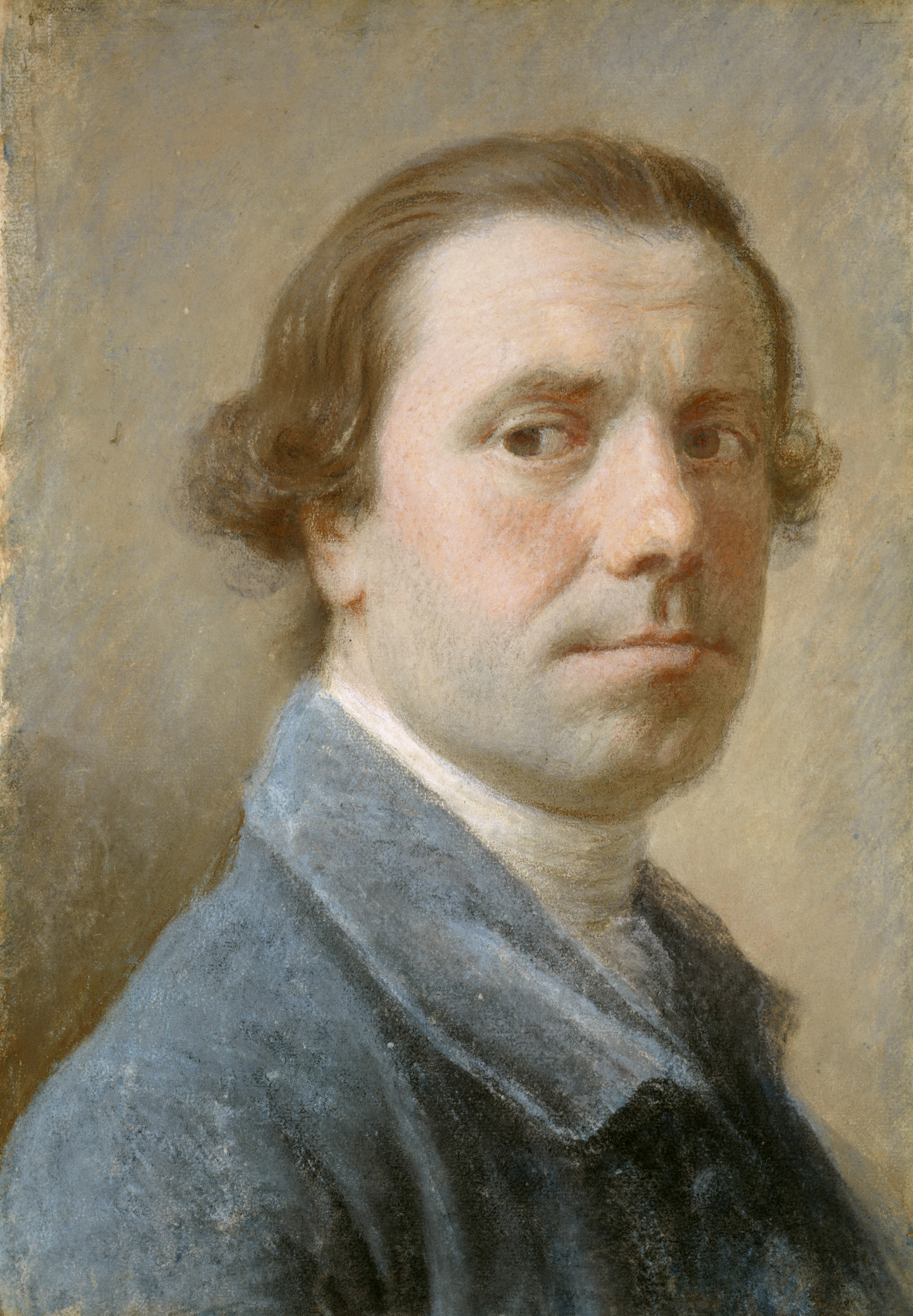
Self-portrait, 1756

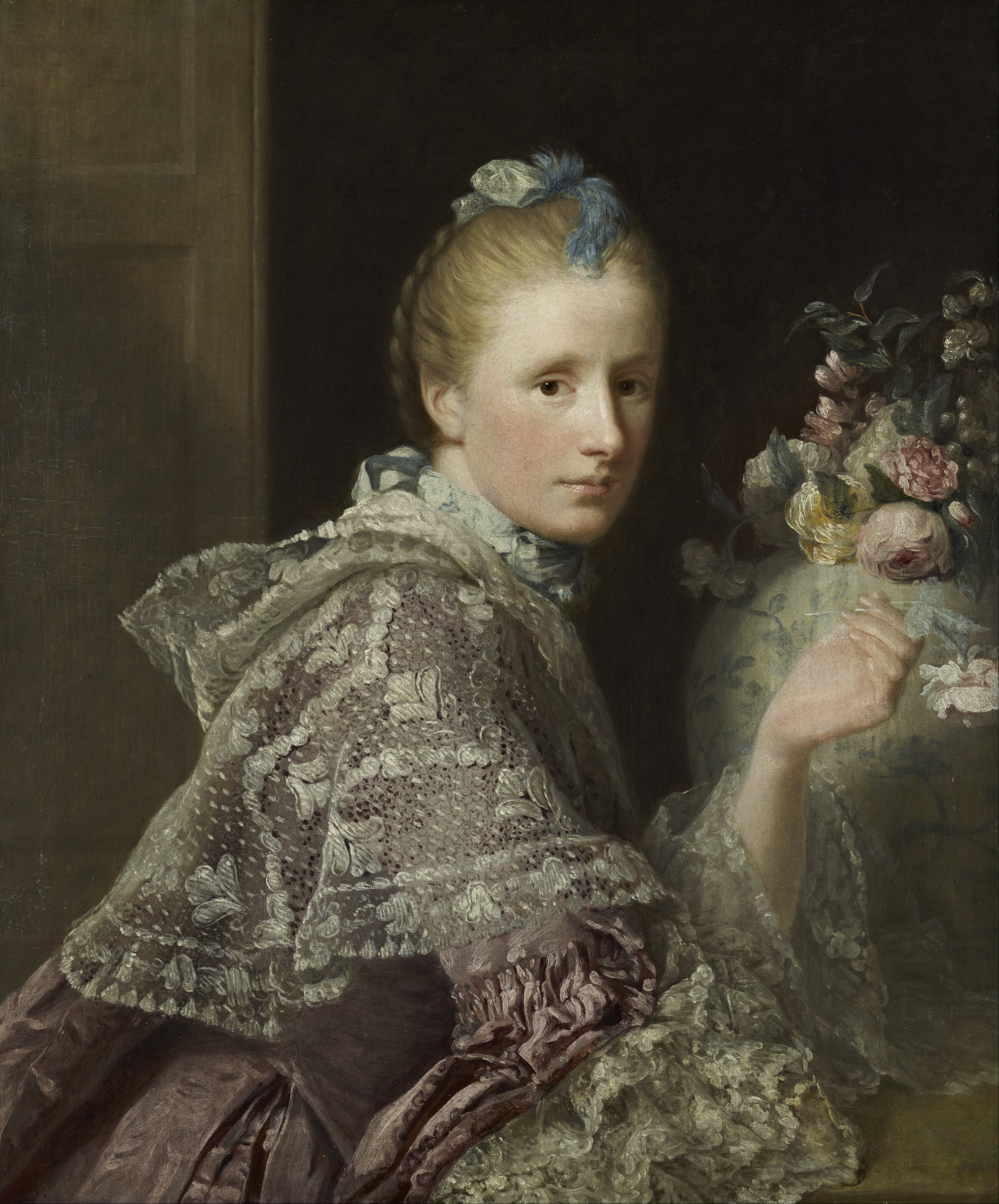
Portrait of his second wife, Margaret Lindsay

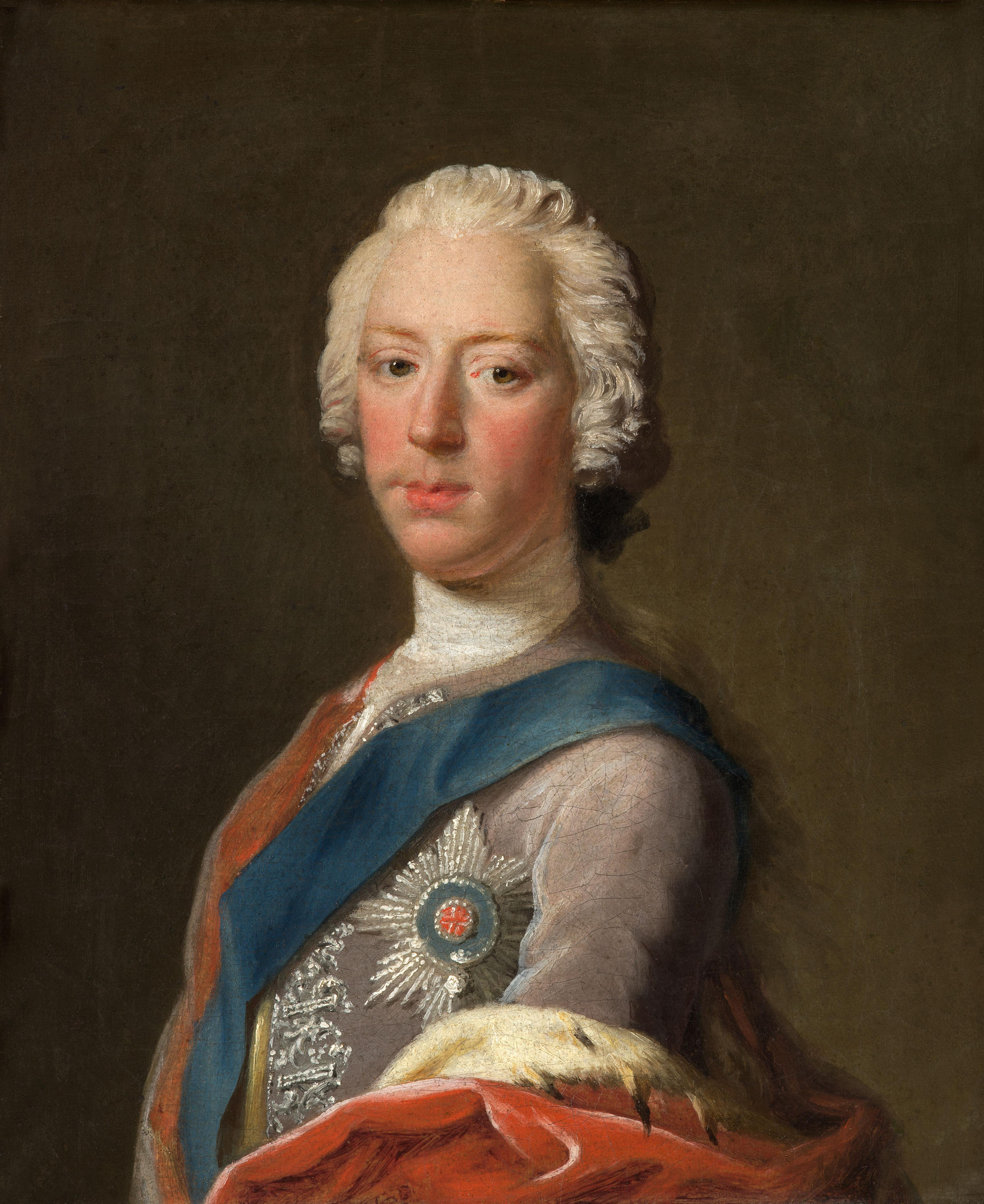
The lost portrait of Charles Edward Stuart, painted in Edinburgh in 1745

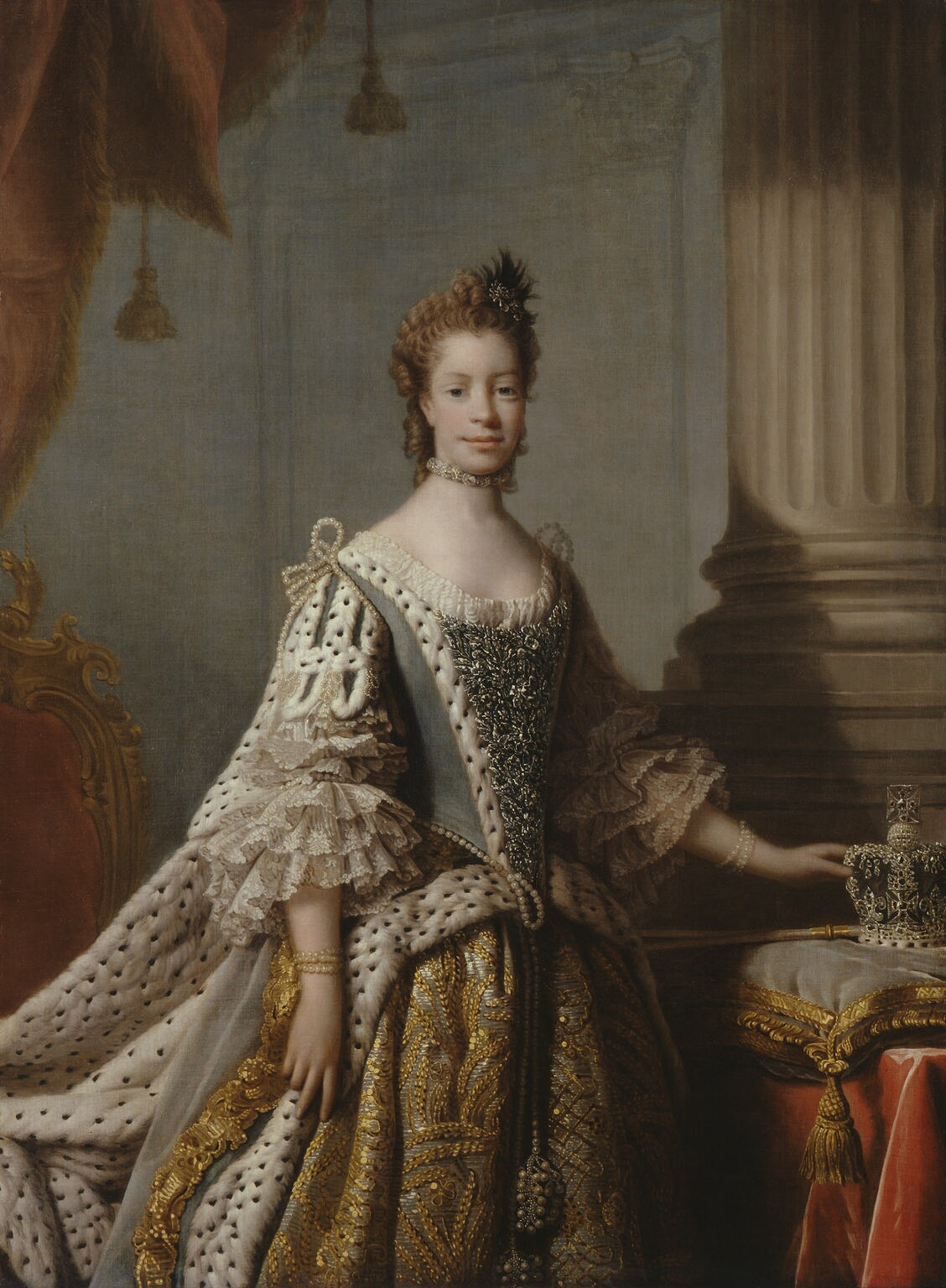
Queen Charlotte as painted by Allan Ramsay in 1762

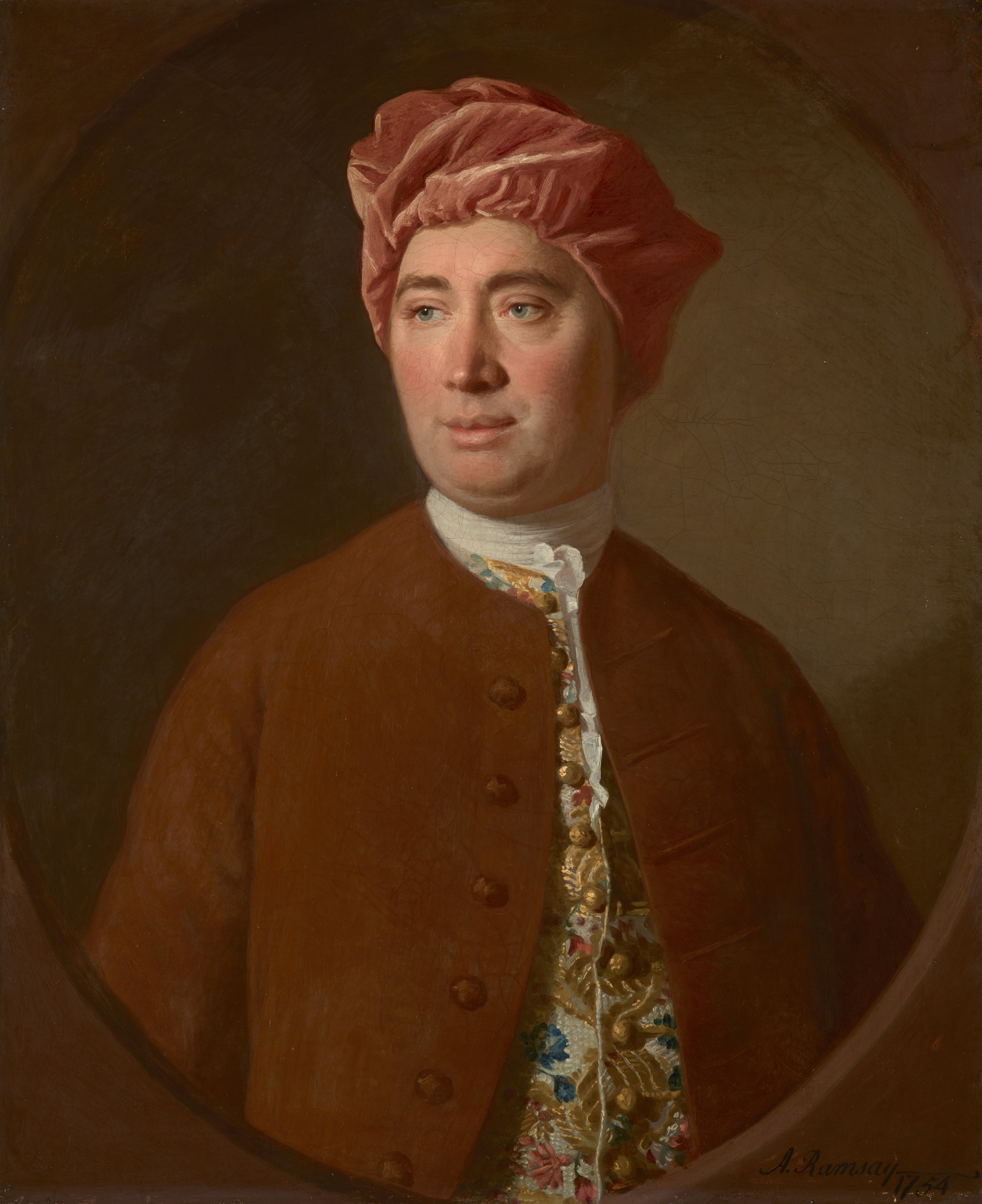
Portrait of David Hume, 1754

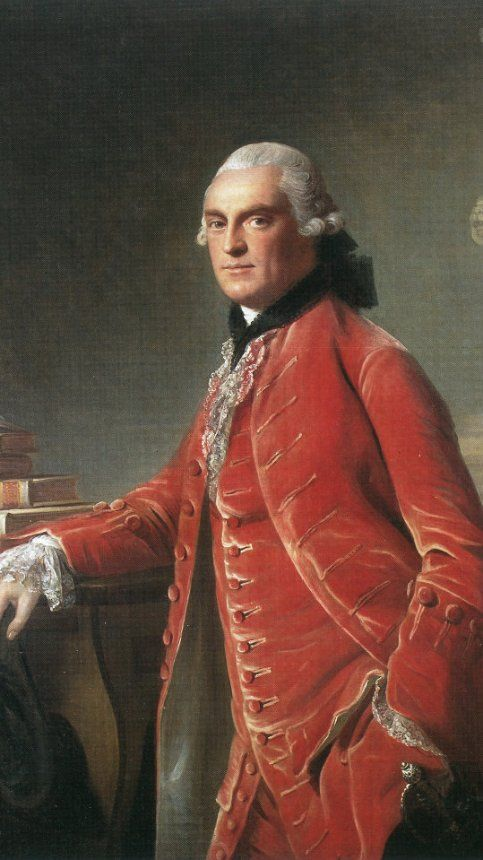
George Coventry, 6th Earl of Coventry

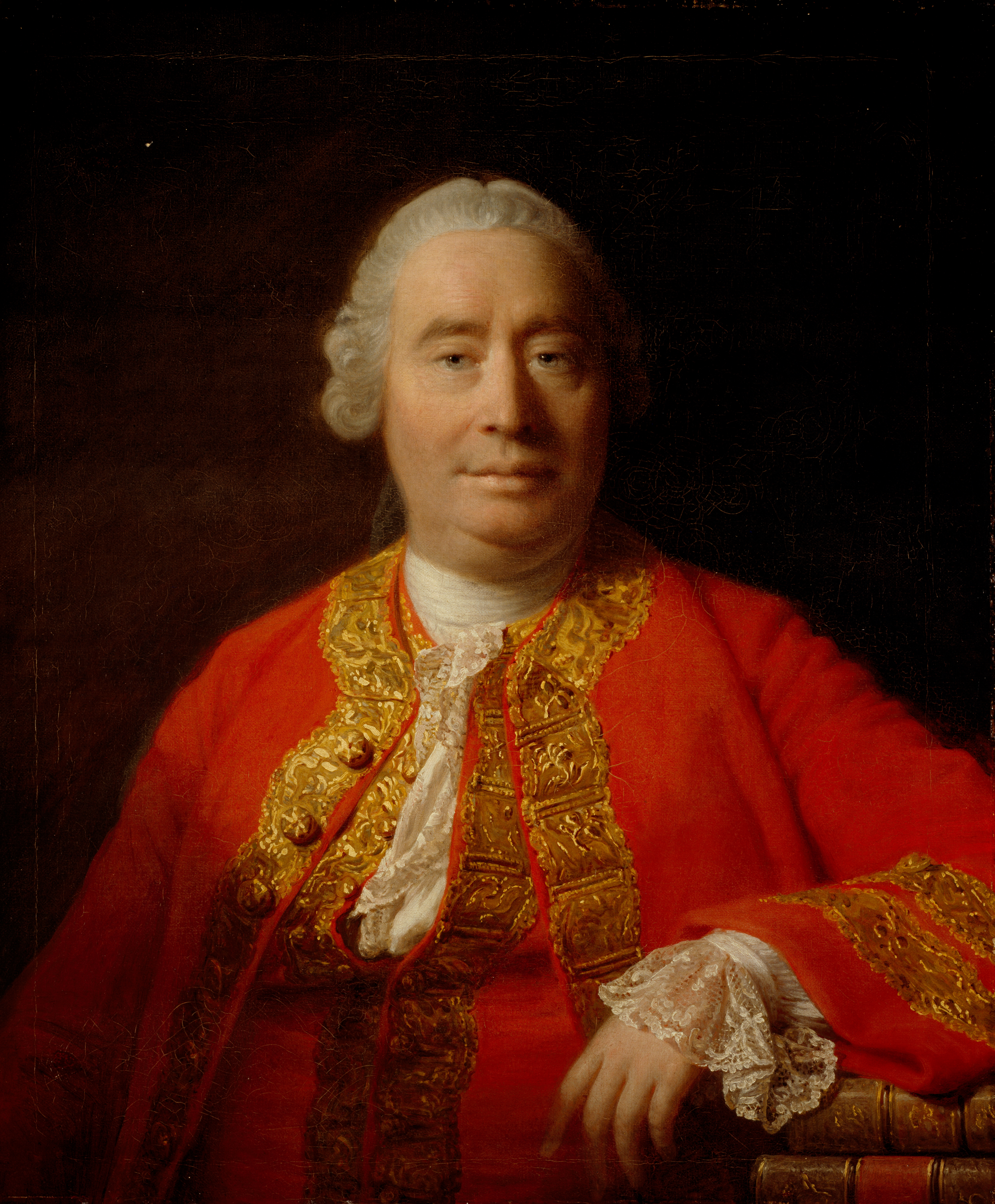
Portrait of David Hume, 1766

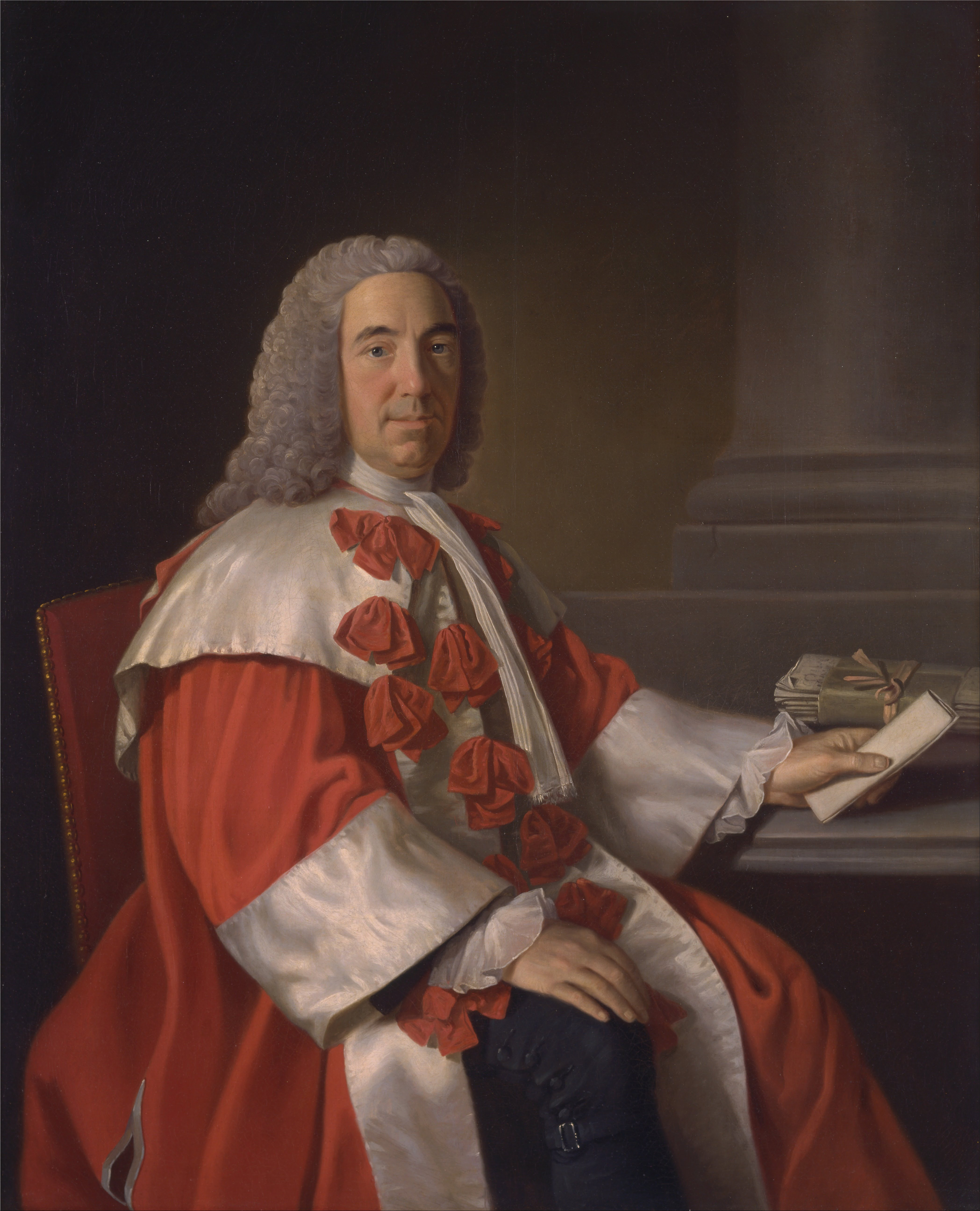
Alexander Boswell, Lord Auchinleck

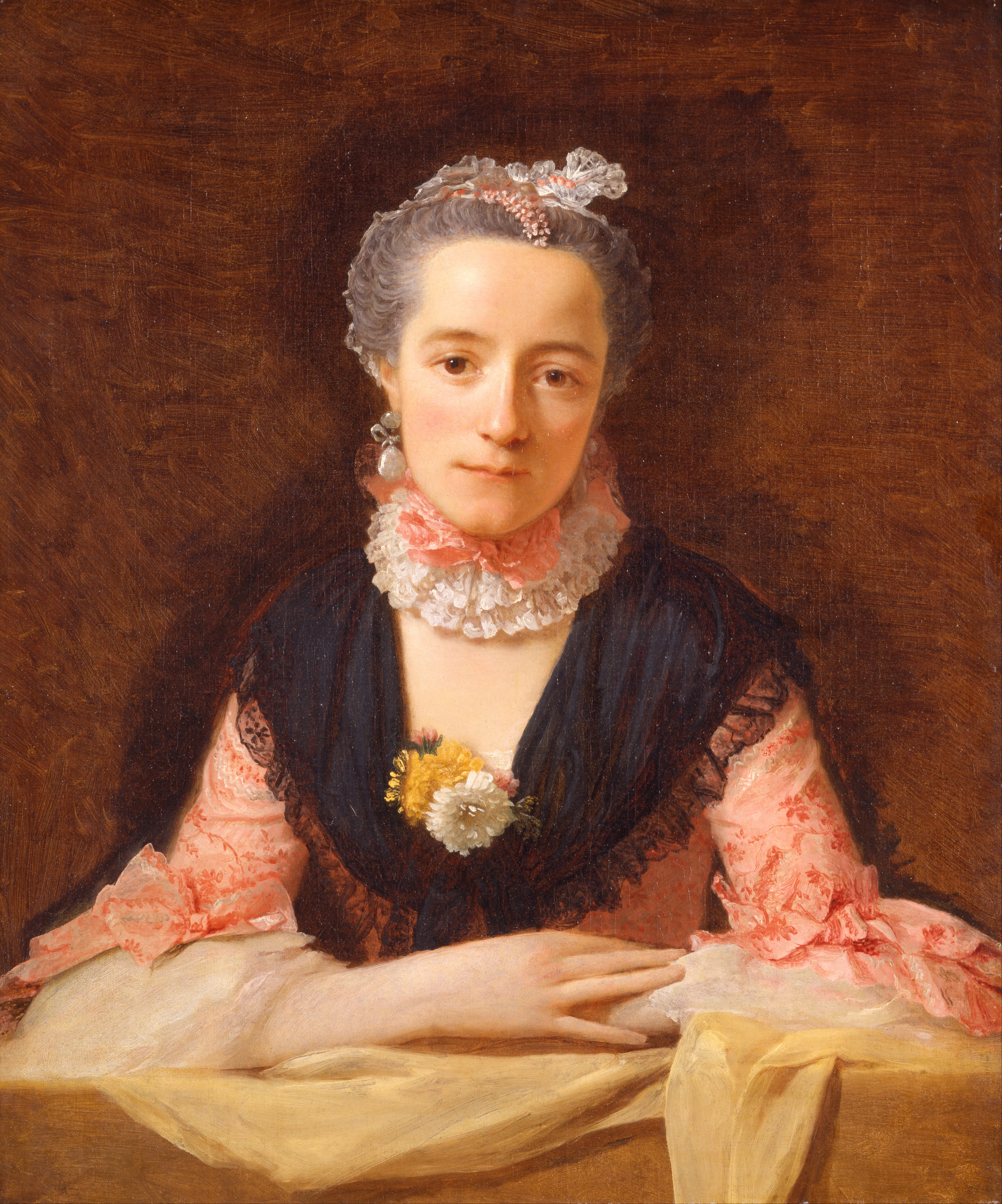
Lady in a Pink Silk Dress

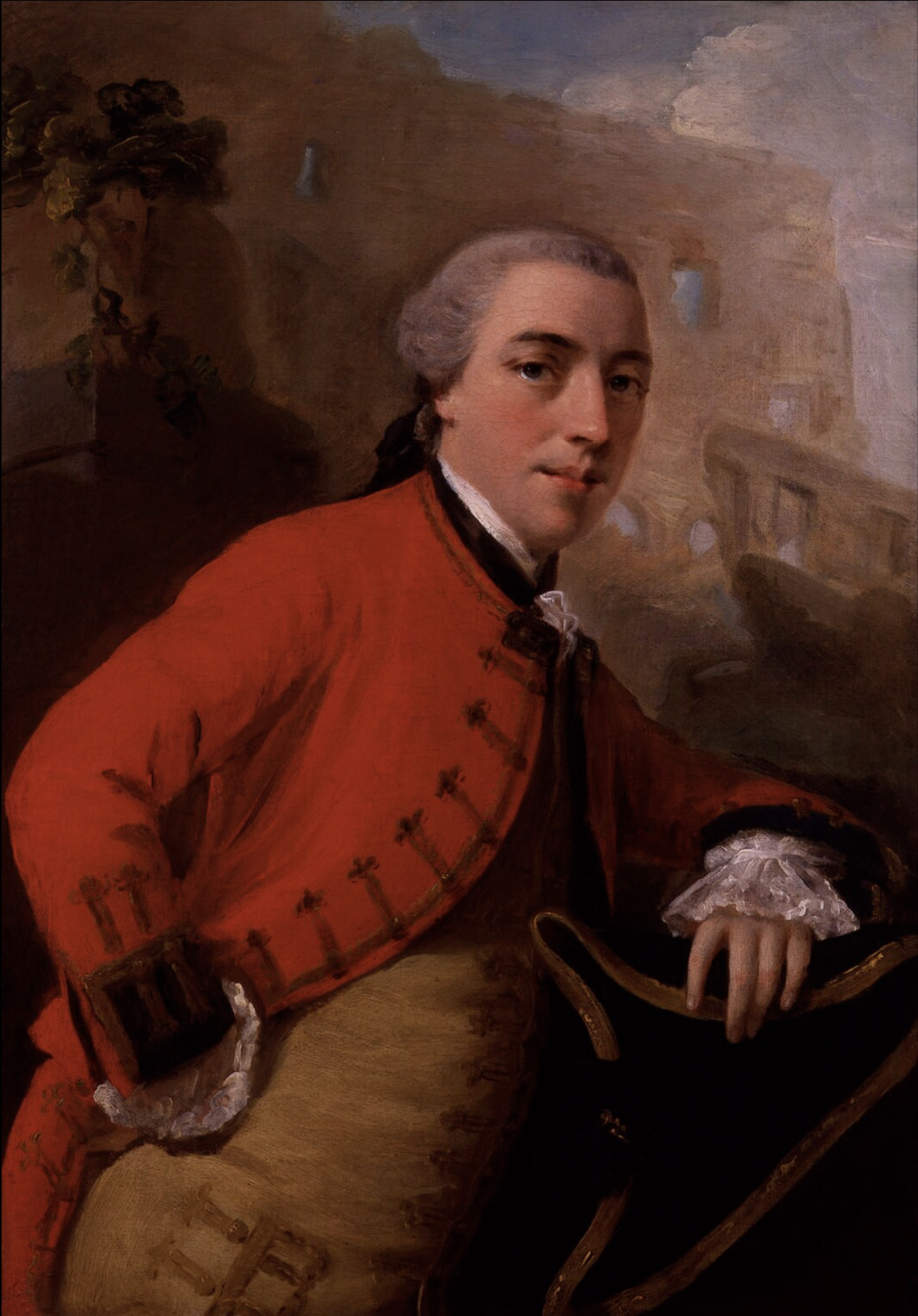
John Burgoyne, painted in Rome in 1758

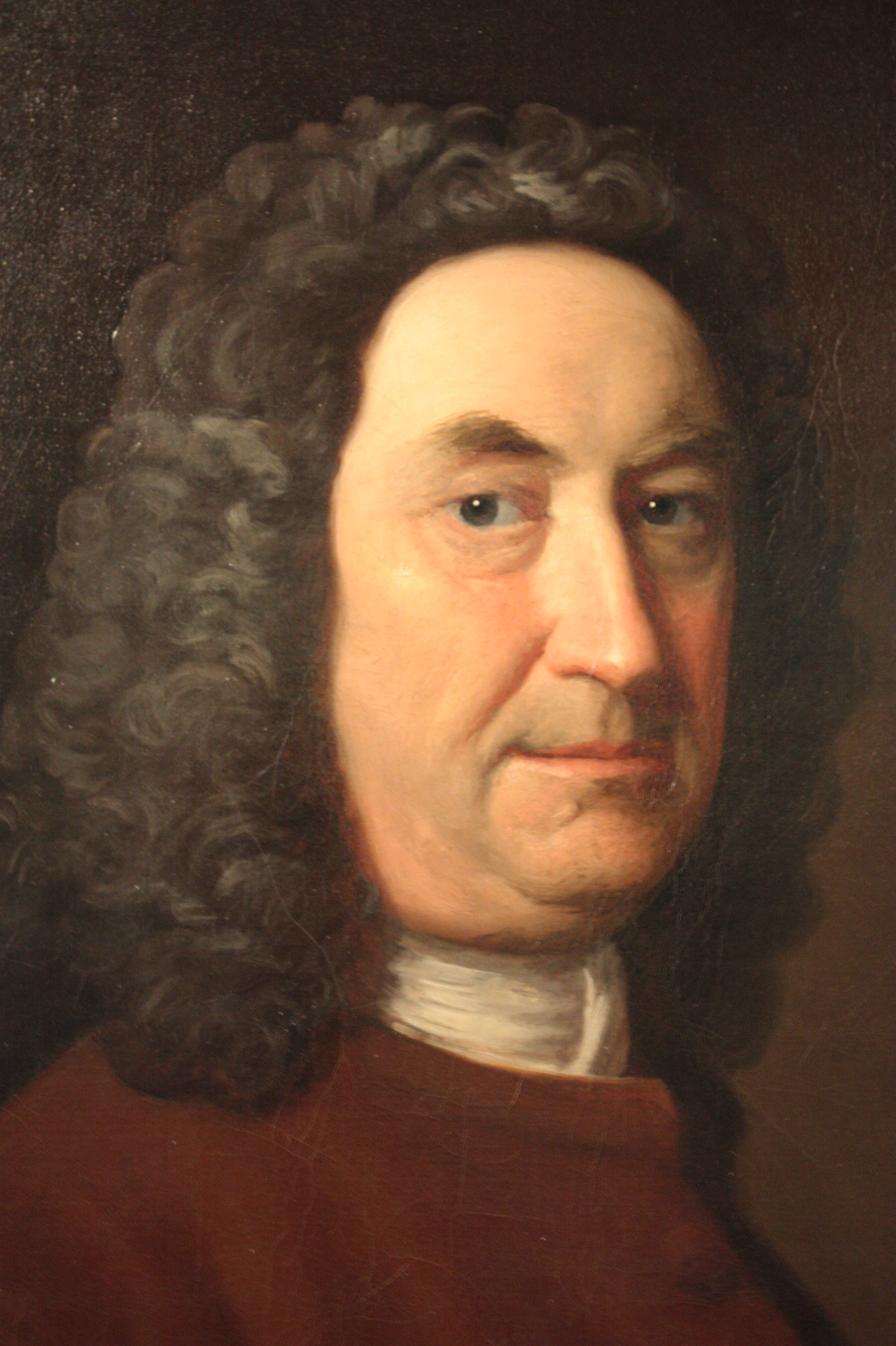
Sir John Inglis, 2nd Baronet

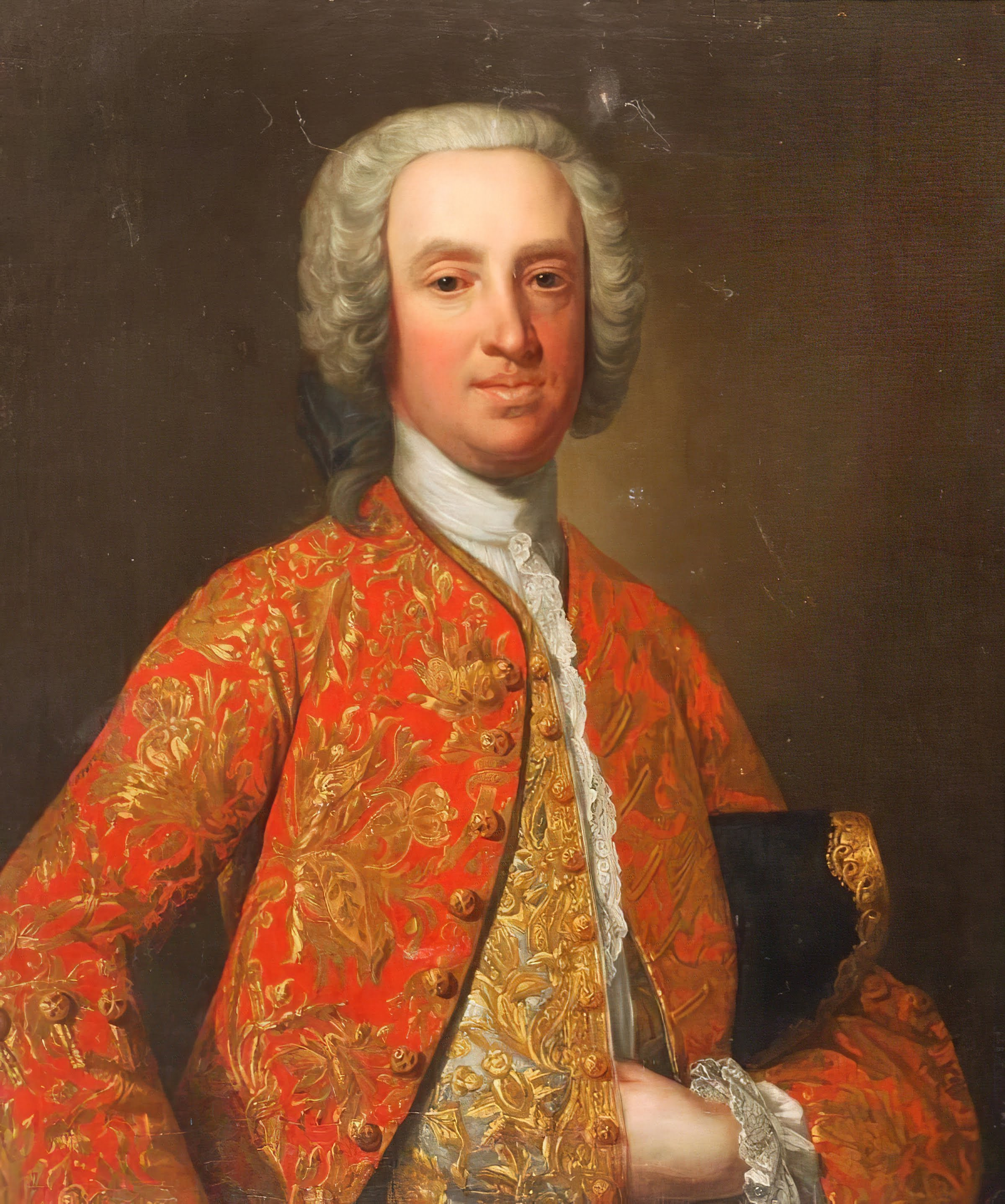
Sir William Douglas, 4th Baronet of Kelhead

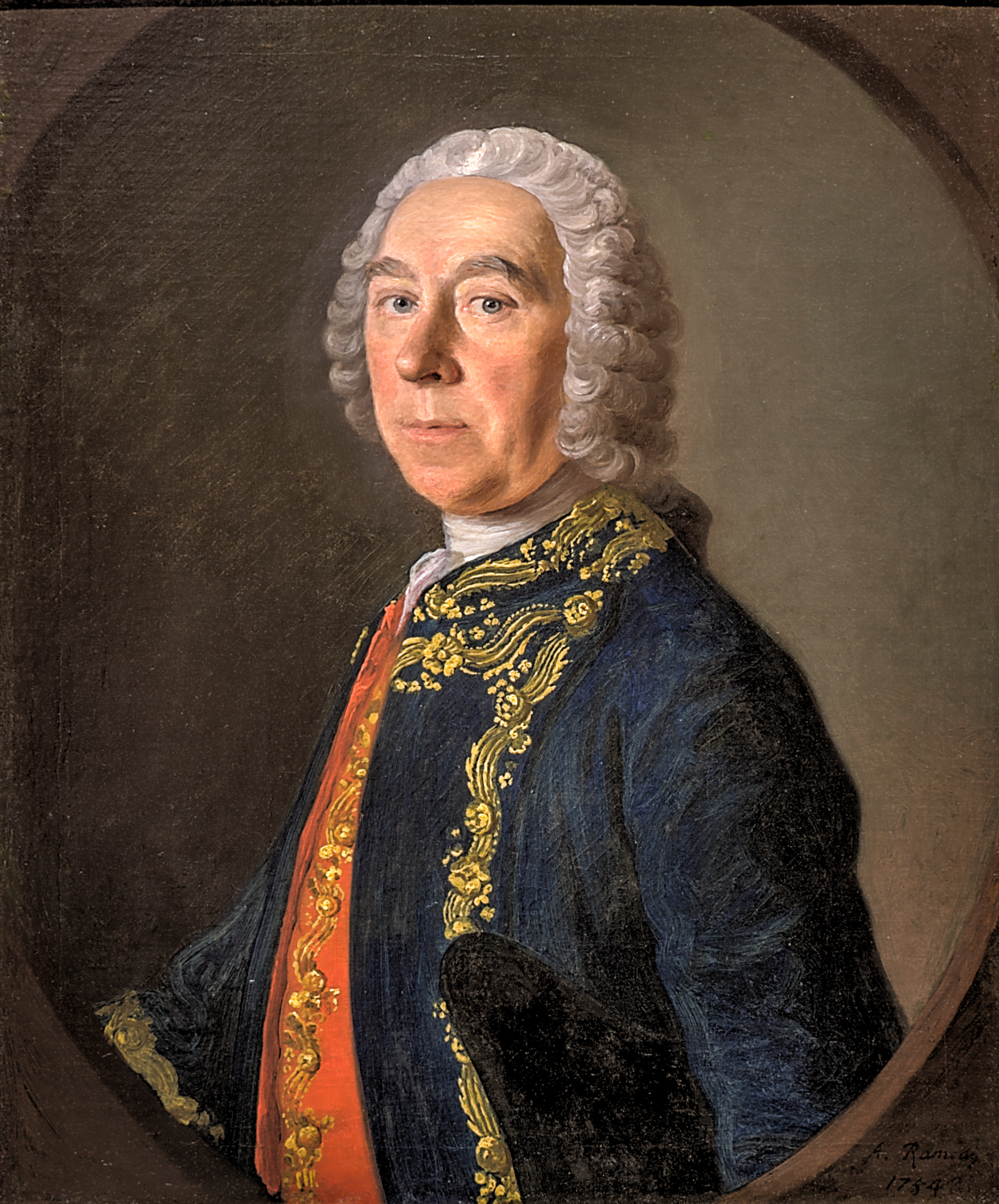
Sir John St. Clair, 1754

== Writings ==
- A Dialogue on Taste, 1762 (Kessinger Publishing, 2009) ISBN 978-1-104-59212-7
- Letters on the Present Disturbances in Great Britain and her American Provinces 1777 (Gale ECCO, 2010) ISBN 978-1170488447
- Observations on the Riot Act, 1781 (Gale ECCO, 2010) ISBN 978-1170486757

Court offices
Preceded by John Shackelton	Principal Painter in Ordinary to the King; 1761–1784	Succeeded by Sir Joshua Reynolds
