= Charles Innes-Ker, 11th Duke of Roxburghe =

British peer (born 1981)

Captain His Grace The Duke of Roxburghe Bt
- Born: Charles Robert George Innes-Ker, Marquess of Bowmont and Cessford; 18 February 1981 (age 45); Leith, Scotland
- Education: Eton College; Newcastle University; Royal Military Academy Sandhurst
- Spouses: The Hon. Charlotte Aitken (m. 2011; div. 2012) Annabel Green (m. 2021)
- Children: Eugenie Innes-Ker; Frederick Innes-Ker, Marquess of Bowmont and Cessford, Robert James Valentine Innes- Ker
- Parent(s): Guy Innes-Ker, 10th Duke of Roxburghe; Lady Jane Grosvenor
- Military career
- Allegiance: United Kingdom
- Branch: British Army
- Rank: Captain
- Unit: Blues and Royals

Charles Robert George Innes-Ker, 11th Duke of Roxburghe (born 18 February 1981), also known as Charles Innes or Charlie Roxburghe and styled as Marquess of Bowmont and Cessford until 2019, is a British aristocrat and military officer.

== Life and career ==
Roxburghe was born in 1981 at Eastern General Hospital in Leith, Edinburgh, the eldest son of the 10th Duke of Roxburghe and his first wife, the former Lady Jane Meriel Grosvenor, daughter of the 5th Duke of Westminster. He was christened at St Andrew's Church, Kelso. His godparents included Sir William van Straubenzee, his great-uncle Lord Robert Innes-Kerr, Annabel, Viscountess Astor and Lady Iona Grimston. His uncle was Gerald Grosvenor, 6th Duke of Westminster. His maternal first cousins are Hugh Grosvenor, 7th Duke of Westminster, and Thomas Anson, 6th Earl of Lichfield.

He was educated at Eton College and the University of Newcastle upon Tyne. In February 2003, while still a student, he was caught travelling on the Tyne and Wear Metro without paying the £1 fare. He chose to pay a £10 fine rather than take the case to court and risk appearing on "losers' posters" displayed around the city, naming people who had been caught travelling without tickets.

He attended the Royal Military Academy Sandhurst, passing out in December 2004, and served with the Blues and Royals in Windsor and Iraq.

Prior to succeeding to the dukedom on his father's death in August 2019, he was styled Marquess of Bowmont and Cessford. As Lord Bowmont and with his fellow officer Rob Bassett-Cross he set up a company called Capstar, which owned a fleet of black Jaguar XJs and provided chauffeur services, employing mostly ex-servicemen and women.

Upon his accession to the dukedom in 2019, he inherited Floors Castle and 60,000 acres around the Cheviot Hills and the River Tweed as well as hotels in the area, with an estimated wealth of up to £100 million.

== Marriages and children ==
On 22 July 2011, he married The Honourable Charlotte Susanna Aitken (b. 15 February 1982), elder daughter of Maxwell Aitken, 3rd Baron Beaverbrook. The couple separated and sued for divorce in June 2012, less than a year after the wedding.

In 2016, he had a daughter Eugénie with a previous partner. On 30 January 2021 his engagement to Annabel Green was announced; they married in September 2021 at Floors Castle. Annabel became upon marriage the Duchess of Roxburghe.

On 28 February 2024, the Duchess gave birth to a son and heir, Frederick Charles Ian Innes-Ker, Marquess of Bowmont and Cessford. Annabel and Charles had their second son Lord Robert James Valentine in 10 October 2025.

== Chiefship of Clan Innes ==
The previous Duke of Roxburghe was heir to the chiefship of Clan Innes (Clann Innis, not Mac Aonghuis or Clan MacInnes); however, since he bears the surname Innes-Ker, the Lord Lyon King of Arms will not recognise the present duke as chief of the name Innes.

Ker and Innes-Ker family tree: Earls of Roxburghe and Dukes of Roxburghe family tree

Lord Roxburghe, 1600; Earl of Roxburghe and Lord Ker of Cessford and Cavertoun, 1616
Robert Ker; 1570–1650; 1st Earl of Roxburghe, etc.	Margaret Ker
Lord Bellenden, of Broughton, 1661
William Ker d. 1643 styled Lord Ker	Lady Jean Ker	Henry Ker d. 1643 styled Lord Ker	William Bellenden d. 1671; 1st Lord Bellenden
William Drummond (Ker); 1622–1675; 2nd Earl of Roxburghe, etc.	Jean Ker	Margaret Ker d. 1681	James Innes; 3rd Innes Baronet
Robert Ker; 1658–1682; 3rd Earl of Roxburghe, etc.	John Ker (Bellenden) d. 1707; 2nd Lord Bellenden	Henry Innes d. 1721; 4th Innes Baronet
Duke of Roxburghe, Marquess of Bowmont and Cessford, Earl of Kelso, Viscount Broxmouth, 1707
Robert Ker c. 1677–1696; 4th Earl of Roxburghe, etc.	John Ker; 1680–1741; 1st Duke of Roxburghe, etc., 5th Earl of Roxburghe, etc.	John Bellenden; 1685–1741; 3rd Lord Bellenden	William Bellenden; 1702–1758	Henry Innes d. 1762; 5th Innes Baronet
Earl Ker, of Wakefield in the County of York, and Baron Ker, of Wakefield in the County of York, 1722	Duke of Roxburghe, 1707 (succession decided, 1812)
Robert Ker c. 1709–1755; 2nd Duke of Roxburghe, etc., 6th Earl of Roxburghe, etc., 1st Earl Ker, etc.	Ker Bellenden; 1725–1753; 4th Lord Bellenden	Robert Bellenden; 1734–1797; 6th Lord Bellenden	William Bellenden-Ker; 1728–1805; 4th Duke of Roxburghe, etc., 8th Earl of Roxburghe, etc. 7th Lord Bellenden	James Innes-Ker; 1736–1823; 5th Duke of Roxburghe, etc., 9th Earl of Roxburghe, etc. 6th Innes-Ker Baronet
Lordship Bellenden extinct, 1805
Earl Innes, 1837
John Ker; 1740–1804; 3rd Duke of Roxburghe, etc., 7th Earl of Roxburghe, etc., 2nd Earl Ker, etc.	John Ker Bellenden; 1751–1796; 5th Lord Bellenden	James Henry Robert Innes-Ker; 1816–1879; 6th Duke of Roxburghe, etc., 10th Earl of Roxburghe, etc., 1st Earl Innes; 7th Innes-Ker Baronet
Dukedom dormant, Earldom Ker and Barony Ker extinct, 1804
James Henry Robert Innes-Ker; 1839–1892; 7th Duke of Roxburghe, etc., 11th Earl of Roxburghe, etc., 2nd Earl Innes; 8th Innes-Ker Baronet
Henry John Innes-Ker; 1876–1932; 8th Duke of Roxburghe, etc., 12th Earl of Roxburghe, etc., 3rd Earl Innes; 9th Innes-Ker Baronet
George Victor Robert John Innes-Ker; 1913–1974; 9th Duke of Roxburghe, etc., 13th Earl of Roxburghe, etc., 4th Earl Innes; 10th Innes-Ker Baronet
Guy David Innes-Ker; 1954–2019; 10th Duke of Roxburghe, etc., 14th Earl of Roxburghe, etc., 5th Earl Innes; 11th Innes-Ker Baronet
Charles Robert George Innes-Ker b. 1981; 11th Duke of Roxburghe, etc., 15th Earl of Roxburghe, etc., 6th Earl Innes; 12th Innes-Ker Baronet
Frederick Charles Ian Innes-Ker b. 2024 styled Marquess of Bowmont and Cessford
Heir apparent to the Dukedom of Roxburghe, etc.

== Notes ==
Peerage of Scotland
Preceded by Guy Innes-Ker	Duke of Roxburghe; 2019–present	Incumbent
Orders of precedence in the United Kingdom
Preceded by The Duke of Montrose	Gentlemen; The Duke of Roxburghe	Succeeded by The Duke of Manchester
