= John Bellenden, 2nd Lord Bellenden =

Scottish nobleman (??–1707)

John Bellenden, 2nd Lord Bellenden (died March 1707) was a Scottish nobleman.

== Early life ==
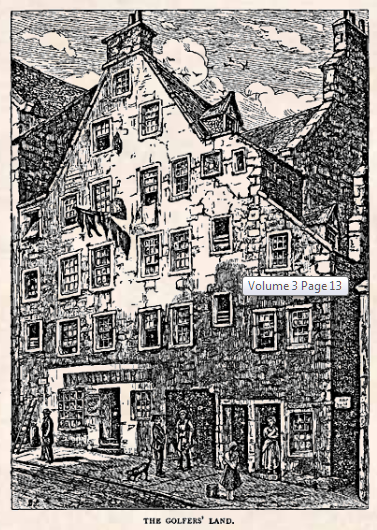
Golfers Land, Canongate, Edinburgh

Born John Ker, he was the fourth son of William Ker, 2nd Earl of Roxburghe (born William Drummond) and the Hon. Jane Ker. Among his elder brothers was Robert Ker, 3rd Earl of Roxburghe (who married Lady Margaret Hay, eldest daughter of John Hay, 1st Marquess of Tweeddale) and William Ker, who served as Sheriff of Tweeddale. His younger sister, Lady Jean Ker, was married to Colin Lindsay, 3rd Earl of Balcarres, a prominent supporter of James II of England.

His parents were first cousins as his mother was the eldest daughter, and heir of line, of the Hon. Harry Ker (from his great-grandfather's second marriage to Jean Drummond, who was also his paternal grandfather's younger sister). His maternal grandmother was Lady Margaret Hay, the only daughter of William Hay, 10th Earl of Erroll and Lady Anne Lyon (daughter of Patrick Lyon, 1st Earl of Kinghorne). After his grandfather died, Lady Margaret remarried to John Kennedy, 6th Earl of Cassilis.

He lived in Golfer's Land on the Canongate (around 500m from the Law Courts in Edinburgh), as immediate successor to its builder, John Paterson. He died in this house and was buried to the east in Holyrood Abbey. After the Union of 1707 Golfers Land became the abode of lower classes and fell into disrepair.

== Titles ==
After his first cousin twice removed, William Bellenden, 1st Lord Bellenden, the son of Sir James Bellenden of Broughton, and Margaret Ker (daughter of Henry Ker, Lord Ker and granddaughter of Robert Ker, 1st Earl of Roxburghe), died without male issue in 1671, Ker took the surname Bellenden and became 2nd Lord Bellenden of Broughton.

== Personal life ==
On 10 April 1683, he married the widow Lady Mary Ramsay, Countess Dowager of Dalhousie (d. 1725/6), the second daughter of Henry Moore, 1st Earl of Drogheda and the former Alice Spencer (fifth daughter of William Spencer, 2nd Baron Spencer and sister of Henry Spencer, 1st Earl of Sunderland). Lady Mary, an aunt of Henry Moore, 4th Earl of Drogheda, had previously been married to William Ramsay, 3rd Earl of Dalhousie. (Note: From Lady Mary's first marriage, she was the mother of George Ramsay, 4th Earl of Dalhousie, William Ramsay, 5th Earl of Dalhousie, Col. Hon. James Ramsay, and Lady Elizabeth Ramsay (first wife of Francis Hawley, 2nd Baron Hawley).) Together, they were the parents of seven children, including:

- John Bellenden, 3rd Lord Bellenden (1685–1740), who married Mary Parnell (1702–1792), daughter of John Parnell of Baldock.
- Hon. Mary Drummond Bellenden (1685–1736), a maid-of-honour to Caroline, Princess of Wales in 1715 and keeper of the Somerset House who married John Campbell, 4th Duke of Argyll in 1720.
- Hon Robert Bellenden (b. 1689), who died unmarried.
- Lt. Col. William Bellenden (c. 1702–1759), who married Jacomina Farmer of Normington, Lincolnshire.
- Hon. James Bellenden.
- Hon. Sir Henry Bellenden (d. 1761), a governor of Hurst Castle in 1745 and Gentleman Usher of the Black Rod in 1747 who was knighted 1749.
- Hon. Margaret Bellenden, who died unmarried.

Bellenden died in March 1707 and was succeeded by his eldest son, John as the 3rd Lord Bellenden. After his death, his widow married for the third time to Dr. Samuel Collins.

=== Descendants ===
Through his eldest son John, he was a grandfather of Ker Bellenden, 4th Lord Bellenden (father of John Bellenden, 5th Lord Bellenden) and Robert Bellenden, 6th Lord Bellenden. As the 5th Lord Bellenden died insolvent in 1796, the office of the usher of the Exchequer, which had been hereditary in the family, was sequestered and sold by his creditors.

Through his son William he was a grandfather to William Bellenden (1728–1805), who later became 7th Lord Bellenden in 1797 and the 4th Duke of Roxburghe in 1804. Upon Williams death in 1805, the Lordship of Bellenden of Broughton became extinct.

Through his son James, he was a grandfather of Mary Bellenden, who married Sir Richard Murray, 6th Baronet.

Through his daughter Mary, he was a grandfather of Lady Caroline Campbell (1721–1803), Field Marshal John Campbell, 5th Duke of Argyll (1723–1806), Lord Frederick Campbell (1729–1816), and Lord William Campbell (1731–1778).

== Family Tree ==
Ker and Innes-Ker family tree: Earls of Roxburghe and Dukes of Roxburghe family tree

Lord Roxburghe, 1600; Earl of Roxburghe and Lord Ker of Cessford and Cavertoun, 1616
Robert Ker; 1570–1650; 1st Earl of Roxburghe, etc.	Margaret Ker
Lord Bellenden, of Broughton, 1661
William Ker d. 1643 styled Lord Ker	Lady Jean Ker	Henry Ker d. 1643 styled Lord Ker	William Bellenden d. 1671; 1st Lord Bellenden
William Drummond (Ker); 1622–1675; 2nd Earl of Roxburghe, etc.	Jean Ker	Margaret Ker d. 1681	James Innes; 3rd Innes Baronet
Robert Ker; 1658–1682; 3rd Earl of Roxburghe, etc.	John Ker (Bellenden) d. 1707; 2nd Lord Bellenden	Henry Innes d. 1721; 4th Innes Baronet
Duke of Roxburghe, Marquess of Bowmont and Cessford, Earl of Kelso, Viscount Broxmouth, 1707
Robert Ker c. 1677–1696; 4th Earl of Roxburghe, etc.	John Ker; 1680–1741; 1st Duke of Roxburghe, etc., 5th Earl of Roxburghe, etc.	John Bellenden; 1685–1741; 3rd Lord Bellenden	William Bellenden; 1702–1758	Henry Innes d. 1762; 5th Innes Baronet
Earl Ker, of Wakefield in the County of York, and Baron Ker, of Wakefield in the County of York, 1722	Duke of Roxburghe, 1707 (succession decided, 1812)
Robert Ker c. 1709–1755; 2nd Duke of Roxburghe, etc., 6th Earl of Roxburghe, etc., 1st Earl Ker, etc.	Ker Bellenden; 1725–1753; 4th Lord Bellenden	Robert Bellenden; 1734–1797; 6th Lord Bellenden	William Bellenden-Ker; 1728–1805; 4th Duke of Roxburghe, etc., 8th Earl of Roxburghe, etc. 7th Lord Bellenden	James Innes-Ker; 1736–1823; 5th Duke of Roxburghe, etc., 9th Earl of Roxburghe, etc. 6th Innes-Ker Baronet
Lordship Bellenden extinct, 1805
Earl Innes, 1837
John Ker; 1740–1804; 3rd Duke of Roxburghe, etc., 7th Earl of Roxburghe, etc., 2nd Earl Ker, etc.	John Ker Bellenden; 1751–1796; 5th Lord Bellenden	James Henry Robert Innes-Ker; 1816–1879; 6th Duke of Roxburghe, etc., 10th Earl of Roxburghe, etc., 1st Earl Innes; 7th Innes-Ker Baronet
Dukedom dormant, Earldom Ker and Barony Ker extinct, 1804
James Henry Robert Innes-Ker; 1839–1892; 7th Duke of Roxburghe, etc., 11th Earl of Roxburghe, etc., 2nd Earl Innes; 8th Innes-Ker Baronet
Henry John Innes-Ker; 1876–1932; 8th Duke of Roxburghe, etc., 12th Earl of Roxburghe, etc., 3rd Earl Innes; 9th Innes-Ker Baronet
George Victor Robert John Innes-Ker; 1913–1974; 9th Duke of Roxburghe, etc., 13th Earl of Roxburghe, etc., 4th Earl Innes; 10th Innes-Ker Baronet
Guy David Innes-Ker; 1954–2019; 10th Duke of Roxburghe, etc., 14th Earl of Roxburghe, etc., 5th Earl Innes; 11th Innes-Ker Baronet
Charles Robert George Innes-Ker b. 1981; 11th Duke of Roxburghe, etc., 15th Earl of Roxburghe, etc., 6th Earl Innes; 12th Innes-Ker Baronet
Frederick Charles Ian Innes-Ker b. 2024 styled Marquess of Bowmont and Cessford
Heir apparent to the Dukedom of Roxburghe, etc.

Peerage of Scotland
Preceded by William Bellenden	Lord Bellenden; 1671–1707	Succeeded by John Bellenden
