= Lord Bellenden =

The title Lord Bellenden, of Broughton, was a lordship of Parliament created in the Peerage of Scotland on 10 June 1661 for William Bellenden, who was Treasurer-depute of Scotland. Shortly before his death, he resigned his peerage in favour of his first cousin twice removed, John Ker (later Bellenden). In 1804, the seventh lord inherited the dukedom of Roxburghe from his cousin. On his death in 1805, the dukedom later passed to another cousin and the lordship of Parliament became extinct.

== Lords Bellenden (1661–1805) ==
- William Bellenden, 1st Lord Bellenden (c.1604–1671)
- John Bellenden, 2nd Lord Bellenden (died 1707). Youngest son of William Ker, 2nd Earl of Roxburghe.
- John Bellenden, 3rd Lord Bellenden (1685–1741). Son of the 2nd Lord.
- Ker Bellenden, 4th Lord Bellenden (1725–1753). Son of the 3rd Lord.
- John Ker Bellenden, 5th Lord Bellenden (1751–1796). Son of the 4th Lord.
- Robert Bellenden, 6th Lord Bellenden (1734–1797). Son of the 3rd Lord, and younger brother of the 4th Lord.
- William Bellenden-Ker, 4th Duke of Roxburghe, 7th Lord Bellenden (1728–1805). Son of William Bellenden, and grandson of the 2nd Lord Bellenden. As the great-grandson of the 2nd Earl of Roxburghe, he became the Duke of Roxburghe upon the death of his cousin, John Ker, 3rd Duke of Roxburghe.

== Family tree ==
Ker and Innes-Ker family tree: Earls of Roxburghe and Dukes of Roxburghe family tree

Lord Roxburghe, 1600; Earl of Roxburghe and Lord Ker of Cessford and Cavertoun, 1616
Robert Ker (1570–1650); 1st Earl of Roxburghe, Lord Roxburghe, and Lord Ker of Cessford and Cavertoun	Margaret Ker
Lord Bellenden, of Broughton, 1661
William Ker (d. 1643) styled Lord Ker	Lady Jean Ker	Henry Ker (d. 1643) styled Lord Ker	William Bellenden (d. 1671); 1st Lord Bellenden
William Drummond (Ker) (1622–1675); 2nd Earl of Roxburghe, Lord Roxburghe, and Lord Ker of Cessford and Cavertoun	Jean Ker	Margaret Ker (d. 1681)	James Innes; 3rd Innes Baronet
Robert Ker (1658–1682); 3rd Earl of Roxburghe, Lord Roxburghe, and Lord Ker of Cessford and Cavertoun	John Ker (Bellenden) (d. 1707); 2nd Lord Bellenden	Henry Innes (d. 1721); 4th Innes Baronet
Duke of Roxburghe, Marquess of Bowmont and Cessford, Earl of Kelso, Viscount Broxmouth, 1707
Robert Ker (c. 1677–1696); 4th Earl of Roxburghe, Lord Roxburghe, and Lord Ker of Cessford and Cavertoun	John Ker (1680–1741); 1st Duke of Roxburghe, Marquess of Bowmont and Cessford, Earl of Kelso, and Viscount Broxmouth, 5th Earl of Roxburghe, Lord Roxburghe, and Lord Ker of Cessford and Cavertoun	John Bellenden (1685–1741); 3rd Lord Bellenden	William Bellenden (1702–1758)	Henry Innes (d. 1762); 5th Innes Baronet
Earl Ker, of Wakefield in the County of York, and Baron Ker, of Wakefield in the County of York, 1722	Duke of Roxburghe, 1707 (succession decided, 1812)
Robert Ker (c. 1709–1755); 2nd Duke of Roxburghe, Marquess of Bowmont and Cessford, Earl of Kelso, and Viscount Broxmouth, 6th Earl of Roxburghe, Lord Roxburghe, and Lord Ker of Cessford and Cavertoun, 1st Earl Ker and Baron Ker	Ker Bellenden (1725–1753); 4th Lord Bellenden	Robert Bellenden (1734–1797); 6th Lord Bellenden	William Bellenden-Ker (1728–1805); 4th Duke of Roxburghe, Marquess of Bowmont and Cessford, Earl of Kelso, and Viscount Broxmouth, 8th Earl of Roxburghe, Lord Roxburghe, and Lord Ker of Cessford and Cavertoun; 7th Lord Bellenden	James Innes-Ker (1736–1823); 5th Duke of Roxburghe, Marquess of Bowmont and Cessford, Earl of Kelso, and Viscount Broxmouth, 9th Earl of Roxburghe, Lord Roxburghe, and Lord Ker of Cessford and Cavertoun; 6th Innes-Ker Baronet
Lordship Bellenden extinct, 1805
Earl Innes, 1837
John Ker (1740–1804); 3rd Duke of Roxburghe, Marquess of Bowmont and Cessford, Earl of Kelso, and Viscount Broxmouth, 7th Earl of Roxburghe, Lord Roxburghe, and Lord Ker of Cessford and Cavertoun, 2nd Earl Ker and Baron Ker	John Ker Bellenden (1751–1796); 5th Lord Bellenden	James Henry Robert Innes-Ker (1816–1879); 6th Duke of Roxburghe, Marquess of Bowmont and Cessford, Earl of Kelso, and Viscount Broxmouth, 10th Earl of Roxburghe, Lord Roxburghe, and Lord Ker of Cessford and Cavertoun, 1st Earl Innes; 7th Innes-Ker Baronet
Dukedom dormant, Earldom Ker and Barony Ker extinct, 1804
James Henry Robert Innes-Ker (1839–1892); 7th Duke of Roxburghe, Marquess of Bowmont and Cessford, Earl of Kelso, and Viscount Broxmouth, 11th Earl of Roxburghe, Lord Roxburghe, and Lord Ker of Cessford and Cavertoun, 2nd Earl Innes; 8th Innes-Ker Baronet
Henry John Innes-Ker (1876–1932); 8th Duke of Roxburghe, Marquess of Bowmont and Cessford, Earl of Kelso, and Viscount Broxmouth, 12th Earl of Roxburghe, Lord Roxburghe, and Lord Ker of Cessford and Cavertoun, 3rd Earl Innes; 9th Innes-Ker Baronet
George Victor Robert John Innes-Ker (1913–1974); 9th Duke of Roxburghe, Marquess of Bowmont and Cessford, Earl of Kelso, and Viscount Broxmouth, 13th Earl of Roxburghe, Lord Roxburghe, and Lord Ker of Cessford and Cavertoun, 4th Earl Innes; 10th Innes-Ker Baronet
Guy David Innes-Ker (1954–2019); 10th Duke of Roxburghe, Marquess of Bowmont and Cessford, Earl of Kelso, Viscount Broxmouth, 14th Earl of Roxburghe, Lord Roxburghe, and Lord Ker of Cessford and Cavertoun, 5th Earl Innes; 11th Innes-Ker Baronet
Charles Robert George Innes-Ker (b. 1981); 11th Duke of Roxburghe, Marquess of Bowmont and Cessford, Earl of Kelso, Viscount Broxmouth, 15th Earl of Roxburghe, Lord Roxburghe, and Lord Ker of Cessford and Cavertoun, 6th Earl Innes; 12th Innes-Ker Baronet
Frederick Charles Ian Innes-Ker b. 2024 styled Marquess of Bowmont and Cessford
Heir apparent to the Dukedom of Roxburghe
