= William Bellenden-Ker, 4th Duke of Roxburghe =

Scottish nobleman (1728–1805)

His Grace The Duke of Roxburghe
- Preceded by: John Ker, 3rd Duke of Roxburghe
- Succeeded by: James Innes-Ker, 5th Duke of Roxburghe

Personal details
- Born: William Bellenden; 20 October 1728
- Died: 23 October 1805 (aged 77)
- Spouses: Margaret Burroughs (m. 1750, died) Mary Bechinne (m. 1789)
- Relations: John Bellenden, 2nd Lord Bellenden (grandfather)
- Parent(s): William Bellenden; Jacomina Farmer Bellenden

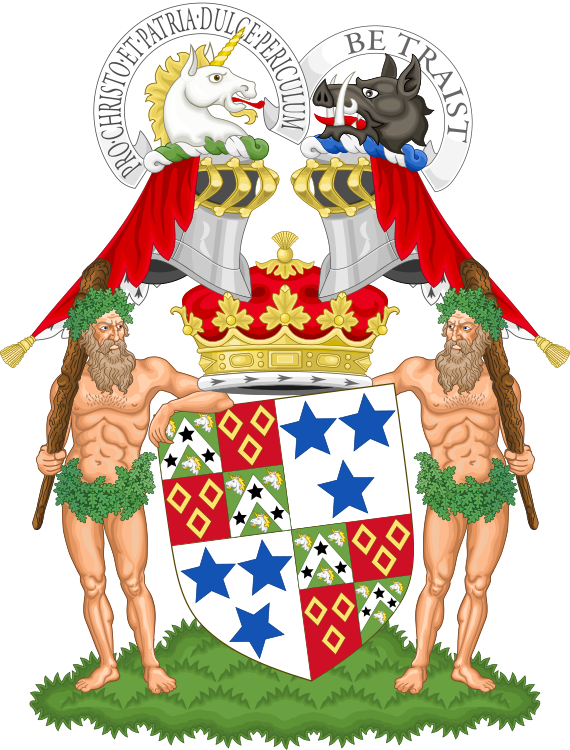
Coat of arms of the Duke of Roxburghe

William Bellenden-Ker, 7th Lord Bellenden, 4th Duke of Roxburghe (20 October 1728 – 23 October 1805) was a Scottish nobleman.

== Early life ==
William was born in 1728 and was baptised on 20 October 1728 at Ashton under Hill, Gloucestershire, England. He was the eldest son and heir of Lt. Col. Hon. William Bellenden (1702–1758) and Jacomina (née Farmer) Bellenden, of Normington in Lincolnshire, who married in 1726. His younger sister was Jacomina Bellenden, the wife of Thomas Orby Hunter, MP for Winchelsea, of Waverley Abbey in Surrey, in 1749.

His father was the third son of John Ker (the third surviving son of William Ker, 2nd Earl of Roxburghe) and Lady Mary Moore (the second daughter of Henry Moore, 1st Earl of Drogheda). His grandfather took the surname Bellenden and became 2nd Lord Bellenden of Broughton (after inheriting from his first cousin twice removed, William Bellenden, 1st Lord Bellenden, the son of Sir James Bellenden of Broughton, and Margaret Ker).

== Career and peerage ==
In 1757, he gained the rank of captain in the 25th Regiment of Foot.

In 1797, upon the death of his unmarried and childless cousin, Robert Bellenden, 6th Lord Bellenden, who was a Capt. of the 11th Regiment of Foot in 1761 and 68th Regiment of Foot in 1767, he succeeded to the titles as the 7th Lord Bellenden of Broughton. On 2 April 1798, he had a grant of £250 a year, as his predecessors.

In 1804, upon the death of another unmarried and childless cousin John Ker, 3rd Duke of Roxburghe, the titles Earl Ker and Baron Ker, which had been created for his uncle in 1722 in the Peerage of Great Britain, became extinct and seventy-five-year old William succeeded to the dukedom, all of its other subsidiary titles, and the family seat, Floors Castle in Roxburghshire on the banks of the River Tweed in south-east Scotland.

== Personal life ==
William was twice married. His marriage took place on 7 December 1750 to Margaret Burroughs, daughter of Reverend Dr. Burroughs D.D., Chaplain at Hampton Court. After her death, he married Mary Bechinne (d. 1838) on 29 June 1789. Mary was the daughter of Captain Benjamin Bechinne RN and Susanna (née Smith) Bechinne (sister of Sir John Smith, 1st Baronet).

Roxburghe died on 23 October 1805 without surviving issue. Less than a year after his death, his widow married Hon. John Manners Tollemache, MP for Ilchester, on 19 August 1806. Tollemache was the second son of Louisa Tollemache, 7th Countess of Dysart.

=== Titles ===
Upon his death, the Lordship of Bellenden of Broughton became extinct, and the succession to the Dukedom of Roxburghe was contested (the Roxburghe cause) until a decision by the House of Lords in 1812 when the Roxburghe and subsidiary titles passed to a distant cousin, James Innes-Ker, who became the 5th Duke of Roxburghe.

== Family Tree ==
Ker and Innes-Ker Family Tree: Earls and Dukes of Roxburghe

EARL OF ROXBURGHE, 1616
Robert Ker, 1st Earl of Roxburghe (1570–1650)
William Ker, Lord Ker (d. 1618)	Lady Jean Ker m. John Drummond, 2nd Earl of Perth	Henry Ker, Lord Ker (d. 1643)
William Drummond (Ker), 2nd Earl of Roxburghe (1622–1675)	Jean Ker	Margaret Ker (d. 1681) m. Sir James Innes, 3rd Bt.
Robert Ker, 3rd Earl of Roxburghe (1658–1682)	John Ker (Bellenden), 2nd Lord Bellenden (d. 1707)	Sir Henry Innes, 4th Bt. (d. 1721)
DUKE OF ROXBURGHE, 1707
Robert Ker, 4th Earl of Roxburghe (c. 1677–1696)	John Ker, 5th Earl of Roxburghe, 1st Duke of Roxburghe (c. 1680–1741)	William Bellenden (1702–1758)	Sir Henry Innes, 5th Bt. (d. 1762)
DUKE OF ROXBURGHE, 1707 (SUCCESSION DECIDED 1812)
Robert Ker; 2nd Duke of Roxburghe (c. 1709–1755)	William Bellenden-Ker; 7th Lord Bellenden, 4th Duke of Roxburghe (1728–1805)	Sir James Innes-Ker, 6th Bt., 5th Duke of Roxburghe (1736–1823)
John Ker, 3rd Duke of Roxburghe (1740–1804)	James Henry Robert Innes-Ker, 6th Duke of Roxburghe (1816–1879)
James Henry Robert Innes-Ker, 7th Duke of Roxburghe (1839–1892)
Henry John Innes-Ker, 8th Duke of Roxburghe (1876–1932)
George Victor Robert John Innes-Ker, 9th Duke of Roxburghe (1913–1974)
Guy David Innes-Ker, 10th Duke of Roxburghe (1954-2019)
Charles Robert George Innes-Ker, 11th Duke of Roxburghe (b. 1981)

Peerage of Scotland
Preceded by John Ker	Duke of Roxburghe; 1804–1805	Succeeded by James Innes-Ker
Preceded by Robert Bellenden	Lord Bellenden; 1797–1805	Extinct
