= Robert Ker, 3rd Earl of Roxburghe =

Scottish nobleman (c.1658–1682)

The Right Honourable The Earl of Roxburghe PC

Personal details
- Born: c. 1658
- Died: 6 May 1682 (aged 23–24)
- Spouse: Lady Margaret Hay (m. 1675)
- Children: Robert Ker, 4th Earl of Roxburghe; John Ker, 1st Duke of Roxburghe; William Ker
- Parent(s): William Ker, 2nd Earl of Roxburghe; Hon. Jane Ker
- Relatives: John Drummond, 2nd Earl of Perth (grandfather)

Robert Ker, 3rd Earl of Roxburghe PC (c. 1658 – 6 May 1682) was a Scottish nobleman.

== Early life ==
Ker was the eldest son of four sons born to William Ker, 2nd Earl of Roxburghe and the Honourable Jane Ker, who were first cousins. Among his younger brothers were William Ker, who served as Sheriff of Tweeddale, and John Ker, who later took the surname Bellenden and became 2nd Lord Bellenden of Broughton (after inheriting from their first cousin twice removed, William Bellenden, 1st Lord Bellenden, the son of Sir James Bellenden of Broughton, and Margaret Ker). His only sister, Lady Jean Ker, was married to Colin Lindsay, 3rd Earl of Balcarres, a prominent supporter of James II of England.

Ker's paternal grandparents were John Drummond, 2nd Earl of Perth, and Lady Jean Ker (the eldest daughter of Robert Ker, 1st Earl of Roxburghe). His father's eldest brother was James Drummond, 3rd Earl of Perth. His cousin, James Drummond, 4th Earl of Perth, was created the Duke of Perth in the Jacobite Peerage in 1701. His maternal grandparents were Hon. Harry Ker and Lady Margaret Hay (the only daughter of William Hay, 10th Earl of Erroll and Lady Anne Lyon, daughter of Patrick Lyon, 1st Earl of Kinghorne). After his grandfather died, his grandmother remarried to John Kennedy, 6th Earl of Cassilis.

== Peerage and career ==
Upon his father's death in 1675, the 17-year-old Ker inherited the titles and estates as the 3rd Earl of Roxburghe. In 1680, Ker served as Privy Councillor. In 1681, he served as Sheriff Principal of Selkirk, also serving as Sheriff of Roxburgheshire and Baillie of the Regality of Melrose.

== Personal life ==
On 10 October 1675, Roxburghe was married to Lady Margaret Hay, eldest daughter of John Hay, 1st Marquess of Tweeddale and Lady Jean Scott, the second daughter of Walter Scott, 1st Earl of Buccleuch. Together, they were the parents of:

- Robert Ker, 4th Earl of Roxburghe (c. 1677–1696), who died unmarried.
- John Ker, 5th Earl of Roxburghe (c. 1680–1741), who married Lady Mary Savile, widow of William Savile, 2nd Marquess of Halifax and only child of Daniel Finch, 7th Earl of Winchilsea. (Note: From Lady Mary's first marriage to William Savile, 2nd Marquess of Halifax, she was the mother of Lady Mary Savile, who married Sackville Tufton, 7th Earl of Thanet in 1722, and Lady Dorothy Savile (1699–1758), who married Richard Boyle, 3rd Earl of Burlington.)
- The Hon. William Ker (d. 1741), who fought on the Continent under the Duke of Marlborough and was present at the Battle of Sheriffmuir. He served as Groom of the Bedchamber to the Prince of Wales in 1714 and was a Member of Parliament for Berwick and Dysart Burghs.

Roxburghe died on 6 May 1682 when HMS Gloucester ran aground on a sandbank off the Norfolk coast. He was succeeded in his titles by his eldest son, Robert. When Robert died unmarried 14 years later, the title passed to his second son, John, who was created Lord Ker of Cessford and Cavertoun, Viscount of Broxmouth, Earl of Kelso, Marquess of Bowmont and Cessford, and the 1st Duke of Roxburghe on 25 April 1707.

== Family tree ==
Ker and Innes-Ker Family Tree: Earls and Dukes of Roxburghe

EARL OF ROXBURGHE, 1616
Robert Ker, 1st Earl of Roxburghe (1570–1650)
William Ker, Lord Ker (d. 1618)	Lady Jean Ker m. John Drummond, 2nd Earl of Perth	Henry Ker, Lord Ker (d. 1643)
William Drummond (Ker), 2nd Earl of Roxburghe (1622–1675)	Jean Ker	Margaret Ker (d. 1681) m. Sir James Innes, 3rd Bt.
Robert Ker, 3rd Earl of Roxburghe (1658–1682)	John Ker (Bellenden), 2nd Lord Bellenden (d. 1707)	Sir Henry Innes, 4th Bt. (d. 1721)
DUKE OF ROXBURGHE, 1707
Robert Ker, 4th Earl of Roxburghe (c. 1677–1696)	John Ker, 5th Earl of Roxburghe, 1st Duke of Roxburghe (c. 1680–1741)	William Bellenden (1702–1758)	Sir Henry Innes, 5th Bt. (d. 1762)
DUKE OF ROXBURGHE, 1707 (SUCCESSION DECIDED 1812)
Robert Ker; 2nd Duke of Roxburghe (c. 1709–1755)	William Bellenden-Ker; 7th Lord Bellenden, 4th Duke of Roxburghe (1728–1805)	Sir James Innes-Ker, 6th Bt., 5th Duke of Roxburghe (1736–1823)
John Ker, 3rd Duke of Roxburghe (1740–1804)	James Henry Robert Innes-Ker, 6th Duke of Roxburghe (1816–1879)
James Henry Robert Innes-Ker, 7th Duke of Roxburghe (1839–1892)
Henry John Innes-Ker, 8th Duke of Roxburghe (1876–1932)
George Victor Robert John Innes-Ker, 9th Duke of Roxburghe (1913–1974)
Guy David Innes-Ker, 10th Duke of Roxburghe (b. 1954)
Charles Robert George Innes-Ker, Marquess of Bowmont and Cessford (b. 1981); Heir Apparent

== Notes ==
Peerage of Scotland
Preceded by William Ker	Earl of Roxburghe; 1675–1682	Succeeded by Robert Ker
