= Innes baronets of Innes (1625) =

Arms of Innes

The Innes, later Innes-Ker Baronetcy, of Innes in the County of Elgin, was created in the Baronetage of Nova Scotia on 28 May 1625 for Robert Innes of Urquhart in County Elgin. It is of 2026 the Premier Baronetcy of that Baronetage. The 6th Baronet succeeded as Duke of Roxburgh in 1812. For further history of the baronetcy, see that title.

== Innes, later Innes-Ker baronets, of Innes (1625) ==
- Sir Robert Innes, 1st Baronet (died c. 1655)
- Sir Robert Innes, 2nd Baronet (c.1690)
- Sir James Innes, 3rd Baronet (c.1700)
- Sir Harry Innes, 4th Baronet (c.1670–1721)
- Sir Harry Innes, 5th Baronet (died 1762)
- Sir James Innes-Ker, 6th Baronet (1736–1823) (succeeded as 5th Duke of Roxburghe in 1812)

See Duke of Roxburghe for further succession.
