= Duke of Roxburghe =

Title in the peerage of Scotland

Dukedom of Roxburghe
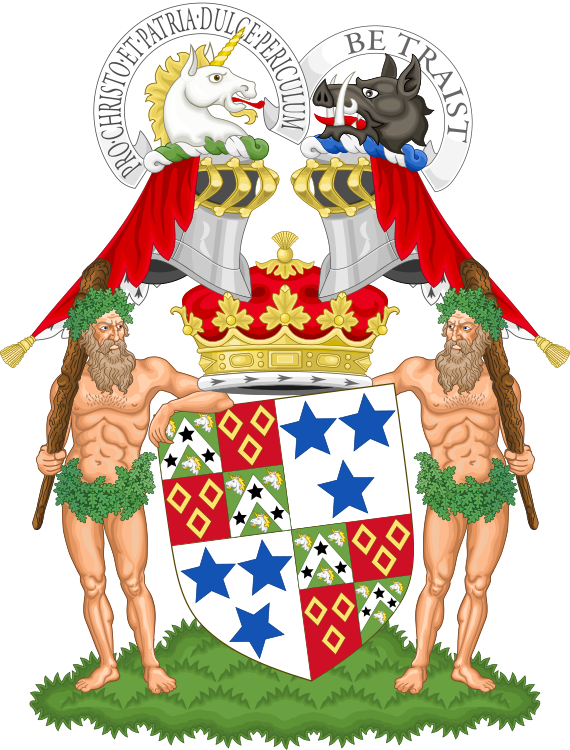
- Quarterly, 1st and 4th grandquarters: quarterly, 1st and 4th, Vert on a Chevron between three Unicorns' Heads erased Argent armed and maned Or as many Mullets Sable (Ker); 2nd and 3rd, Gules three Mascles Or (Weepont); 2nd and 3rd grandquarters: Argent three Stars of five points Azure (Innes).
- Creation date: 1707
- Created by: Anne
- Peerage: Peerage of Scotland
- First holder: John Ker, 5th Earl of Roxburghe
- Present holder: Charles Innes-Ker, 11th Duke
- Heir apparent: Frederick Innes-Ker, Marquess of Bowmont and Cessford
- Remainder to: the heirs inheriting the Earldom of Roxburghe (see that section for details)
- Subsidiary titles: Marquess of Bowmont and Cessford; Earl of Roxburghe; Earl of Kelso; Earl Innes; Viscount Broxmouth; Lord Roxburghe; Lord Ker of Cessford and Cavertoun
- Seat: Floors Castle

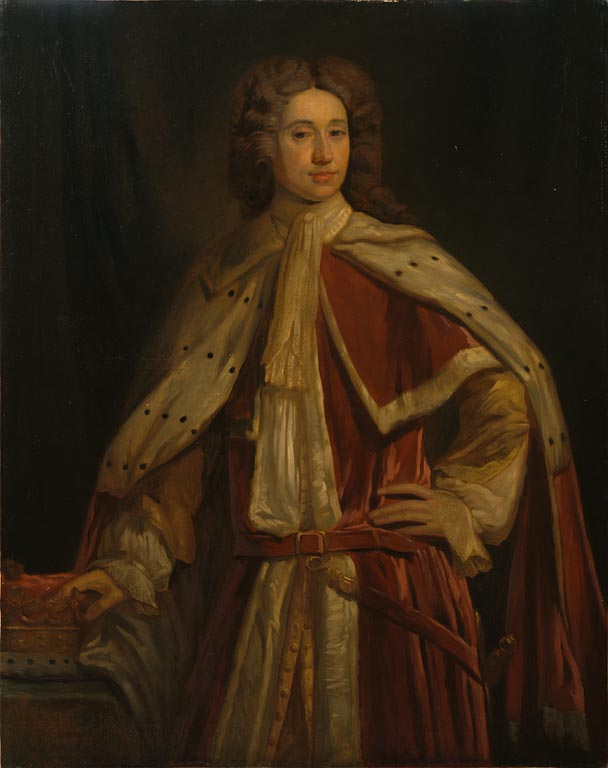
John Ker, 1st Duke of Roxburghe

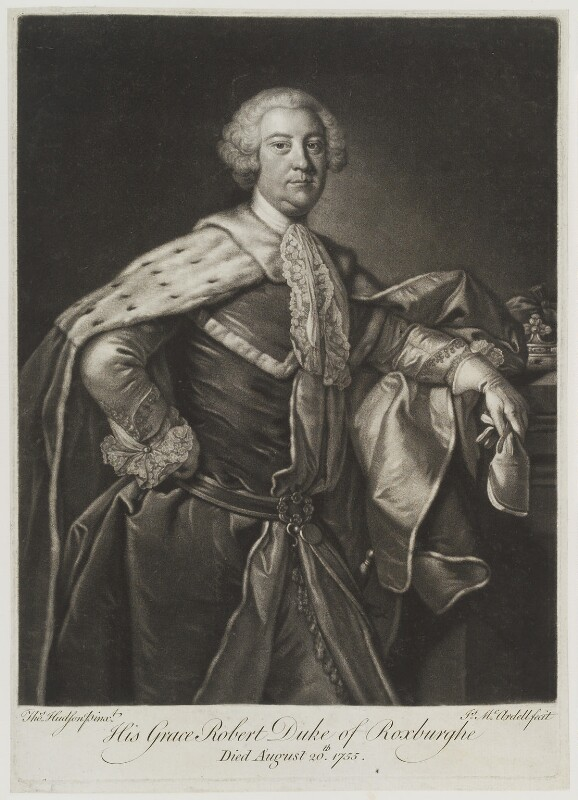
Robert Ker, 2nd Duke of Roxburghe

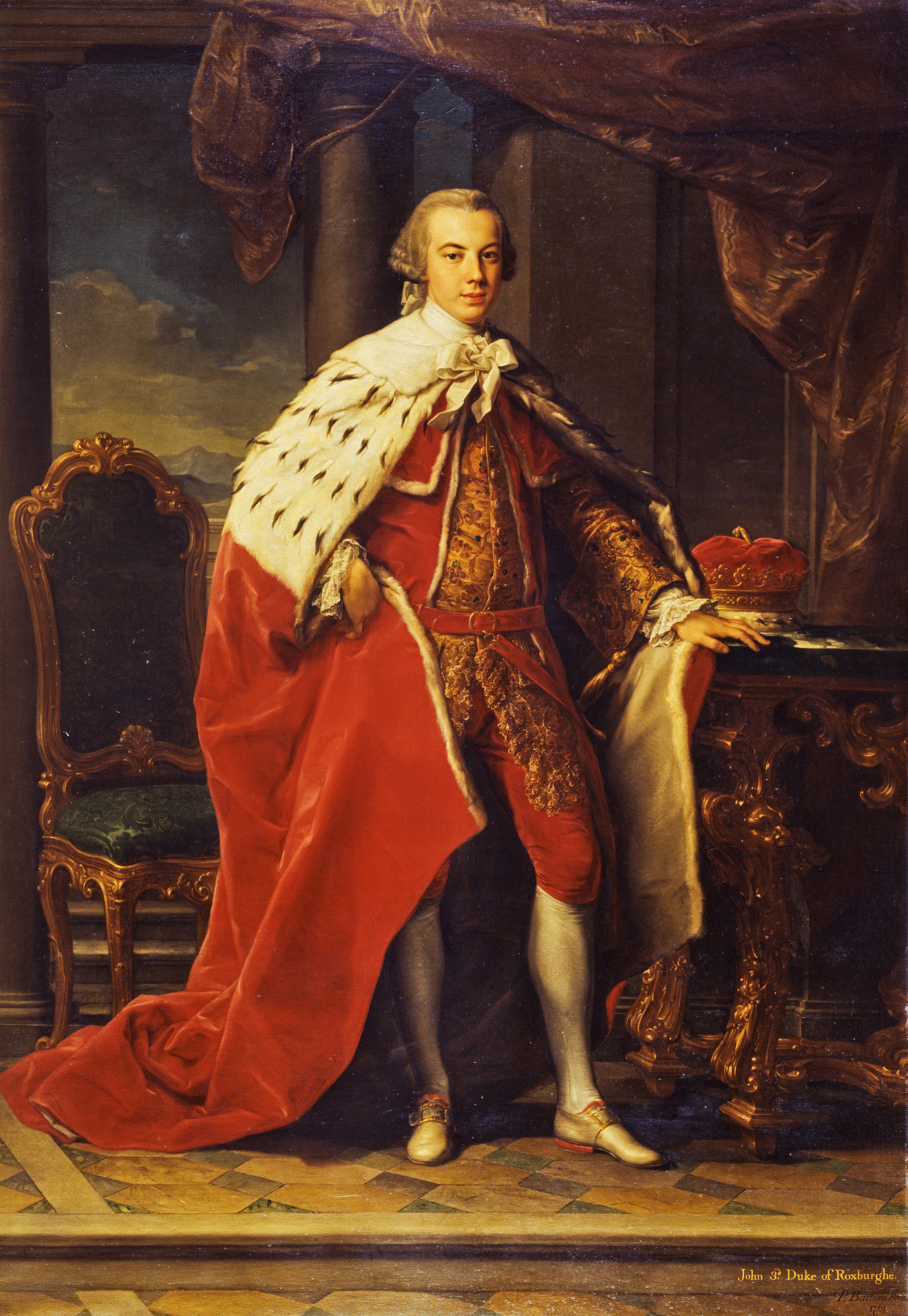
John Ker, 3rd Duke of Roxburghe

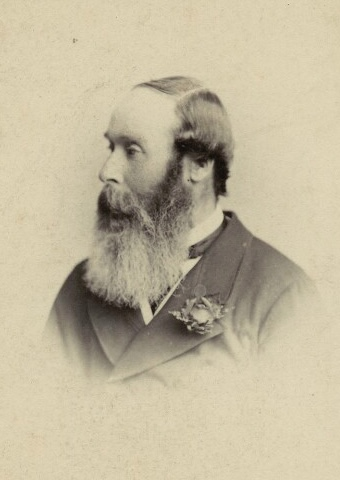
James Henry Robert Innes-Ker, 6th Duke of Roxburghe.

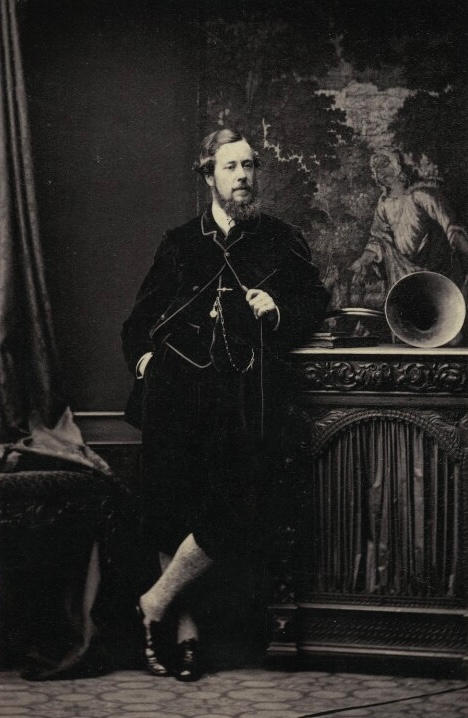
James Henry Robert Innes-Ker, 7th Duke of Roxburghe

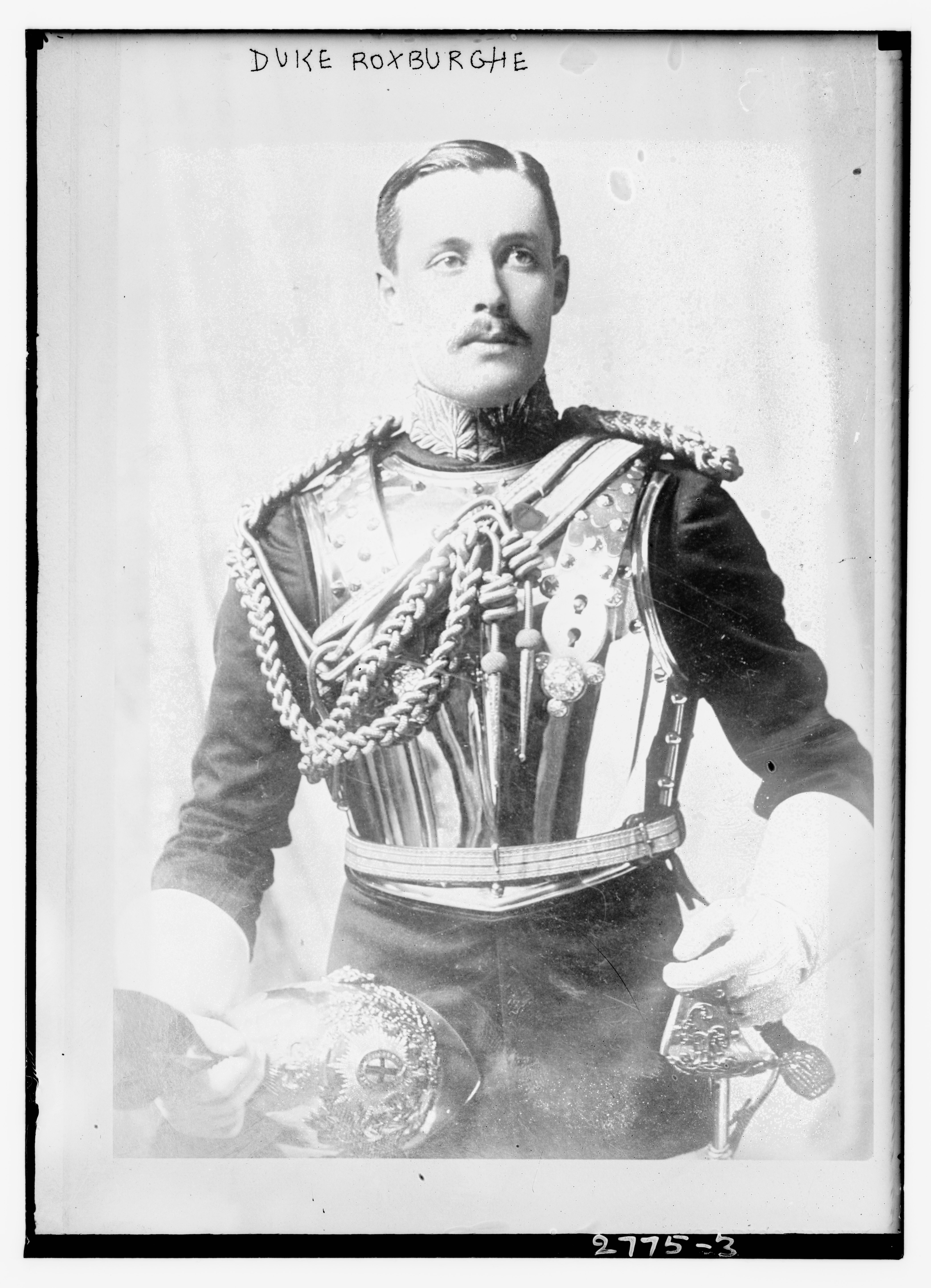
Henry John Innes-Ker, 8th Duke of Roxburghe

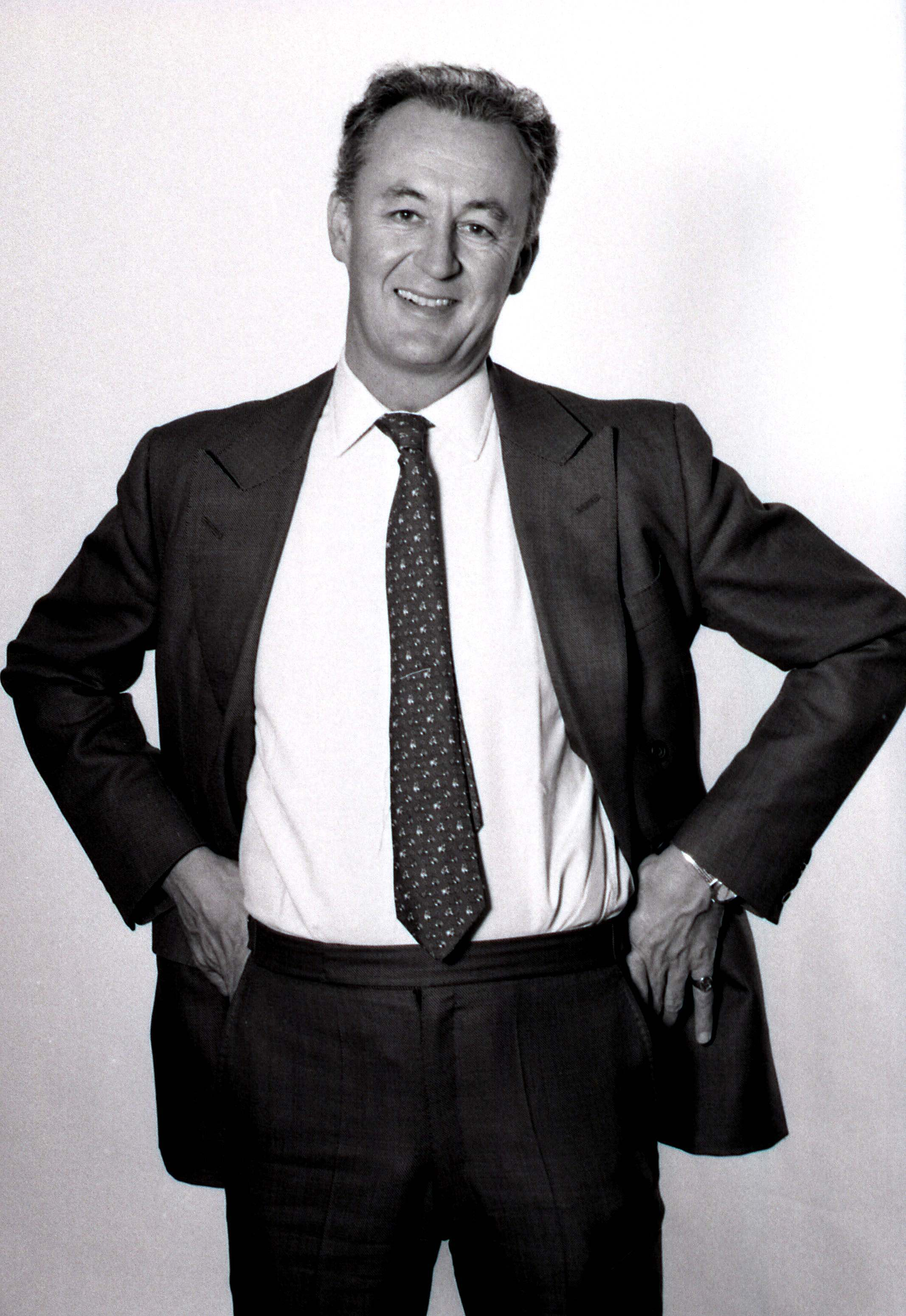
Guy David Innes-Ker, 10th Duke of Roxburghe

The Duke of Roxburghe (/ˈrɒksbərə/) is a title in the peerage of Scotland created in 1707 along with the titles Marquess of Bowmont and Cessford, Earl of Kelso and Viscount Broxmouth. John Ker, 5th Earl of Roxburghe became the first holder of these titles. The title is derived from the royal burgh of Roxburgh in the Scottish Borders that in 1460 the Scots captured and destroyed.

Originally created Earl of Roxburghe in 1616, before the elevation to duke, a number of other subsidiary titles are held: Marquess of Bowmont and Cessford (created 1707), Earl of Kelso (1707), Earl Innes (1837), Viscount Broxmouth (1707), Lord Roxburghe (1600), and Lord Ker of Cessford and Cavertoun (1616). All of the titles form part of the peerage of Scotland, with the exception the Earldom of Innes, which belongs to the peerage of the United Kingdom. The Duke's eldest son bears the courtesy title of Marquess of Bowmont and Cessford.

The dukedom and its associated titles descend to heirs who shall inherit the earldom which in turn had a very specific line of descent. On the death of the 4th duke the titles became dormant as no one could prove their claim. In 1812 the House of Lords ruled in favour of Sir James Innes-Ker, 6th Baronet, of Innes (see Innes baronets), rejecting claims by the heir female of the second earl and heir male whatsoever of the first earl.

The Duke of Roxburghe would be the Chief of Clan Innes, but cannot be so recognised as he retains the name Innes-Ker.

== Estates and residences ==
=== Family seat ===
The family has its seat at Floors Castle near Kelso, Scotland. The grounds contain the ruins of Roxburgh Castle on a promontory between the rivers Tweed and Teviot. The traditional burial place of the Dukes of Roxburghe is the Roxburghe Memorial Cloister (also known as "Roxburghe Aisle"), a 20th-century addition to the ruins of Kelso Abbey.

=== Landholdings and wealth ===
In the 1883 edition of John Bateman's The Great Landowners of Great Britain and Ireland, James Innes-Ker, 7th Duke of Roxburghe's estates were recorded as spanning 60,418 acres across Scotland, including 50,459 acres in Roxburghshire, 6,096 acres in Berwickshire, and 3,863 acres in Haddingtonshire, which produced a combined annual income of £50,917.

The family's wealth was considerably increased in 1903 when Henry Innes-Ker, 8th Duke of Roxburghe married the wealthy New York heiress Mary Goelet, who was the daughter of real-estate millionaire Ogden Goelet. When Odgen Goelet died in 1897, his daughter had inherited $500,000 outright and the income from a $10,000,000 Trust fund, as well as a reversionary interest in half of his $30,000,000 residuary estate, which Mary would receive upon the death of her mother Mary Wilson Goelet.

When their grandson, Guy Innes-Ker, 10th Duke of Roxburghe, died in 2019 The Times estimated his wealth at £132,000,000.

=== London residences ===
John Ker, 1st Duke of Roxburghe maintained Roxburghe House at No. 13 Hanover Square, Mayfair as his London residence. The house underwent extensive remodeling at the behest of his grandson John Ker, 3rd Duke of Roxburghe, who later sold Roxburghe House to Henry Lascelles, 2nd Earl of Harewood in 1795.

By the late nineteenth century the Dukes of Roxburghe did not maintain a permanent residence in London, instead taking short leases of various houses in Mayfair for the London Social season each year. James Innes-Ker, 7th Duke of Roxburghe leased Archibald Kennedy, 3rd Marquess of Ailsa's house in Charles Street for two months during the London season in 1885, and in 1887 the Roxburghe's took a short lease of Thomas Taylour, 3rd Marquess of Headfort's house in Belgrave Square.

During the 1889 season the Duke and Duchess of Roxburghe stayed with the Duchess' mother Frances, Dowager Duchess of Marlborough at her house at No. 50 Grosvenor Square for the season, and later leased No. 43 Cadogan Square in 1890.

Following the death of the 7th Duke in 1892, his widow Anne, Duchess of Roxburghe continued to lease a series of London townhouses for each season, including No. 27 Portman Square in 1893, No. 58 Grosvenor Street in 1894, No. 1 Chesterfield Gardens in 1895, No. 11 Hereford Gardens in 1897, and No. 9 Portman Square in 1898.

In February 1899 Anne, Duchess of Roxburghe leased No. 45 Portman Square for the London season from Consuelo Montagu, Duchess of Manchester, where her mother Frances, Dowager Duchess of Marlborough died in April.

In April 1900 the Duchess of Roxburghe reportedly purchased No. 32 Grosvenor Square, which continued to be the family's London home in 1901. The Duchess later leased No. 38 Grosvenor Street in 1903, which she continued to occupy until 1908.

Anne became formally known as the Dowager Duchess of Roxburghe following the marriage of her son Henry John Innes-Ker, 8th Duke of Roxburghe to the American heiress Mary Goelet in November 1903. In 1907 the 8th Duke and Duchess leased a large London mansion, Stratford House at No. 11 Stratford Place from Edward Colebrooke, 1st Baron Colebrooke, and later leased Chesterfield House, Mayfair as their London residence from The Dowager Lady Burton (whose husband Michael Bass, 1st Baron Burton had bequeathed her a life interest in the freehold of the property) in 1909. The Duke and Duchess of Roxburghe continued to lease Chesterfield House until 1919, although the building was loaned to the British Government during the First World War, and later to the Head of the American Special Mission to the United Kingdom, Colonel House from November 1917 until 1919.

In August 1921 the 8th Duke and Duchess acquired a new London home at No. 2 Carlton House Terrace from the executors of Sir James Horlick, 1st Baronet. which became their London residence throughout the 1920s and early 1930s. Following the death of the Duke in 1932, his widow Mary, Dowager Duchess of Roxburghe continued to occupy the house until her own death in 1937.

Her son George Innes-Ker, 9th Duke of Roxburghe married Lady Mary Crewe-Milnes in October 1935, and the couple initially maintained their London residence at No. 55 Great Cumberland Place, until he inherited the lease of No. 2 Carlton House Terrace from his mother's estate; this remainded as the Roxburghe's London home until 1939.

== Earls of Roxburghe (1616) ==
In 1600, Robert Ker was created Lord Roxburghe, in 1616 he was additionally created Earl of Roxburghe, and Lord Ker of Cessford and Cavertoun. The succession was originally to heirs male of the 1st Earl, but after his sons predeceased him, the title was recreated in 1646 with additional remainder in favour of "(i) his grandson by his eldest daughter, Sir William Drummond, and his issue in tail male, (ii) of his great-grandsons in like manner, i.e. the second and other younger sons of Jane Drummond, the sister of Sir William Drummond, by her husband John [Fleming], 3rd Earl of Wigtown [...] which failing (iii) of the eldest daughter of Hon Harry Ker, styled Lord Ker, without division and to her heirs male, which failing (iv) to his own heirs male whomsoever".

- Robert Ker, 1st Earl of Roxburghe (1570–1650) had been Lord Roxburghe since 1600, died without male issue
  - William Ker, Lord Ker (died 1618), elder son of the 1st Earl, predeceased his father without issue
  - Henry Ker, Lord Ker (died 1643), younger son of the 1st Earl, predeceased his father without male issue
- William Ker, 2nd Earl of Roxburghe (1622–1675), a female-line grandson of the 1st Earl, succeeded him by the above special arrangement
- Robert Ker, 3rd Earl of Roxburghe (c. 1658–1682), eldest son of the 2nd Earl
- Robert Ker, 4th Earl of Roxburghe (c. 1677–1696), eldest son of the 3rd Earl
- John Ker, 5th Earl of Roxburghe (c. 1680–1741), second son of the 3rd Earl, became Duke of Roxburghe in 1707

== Dukes of Roxburghe (1707) ==
- John Ker, 1st Duke of Roxburghe (c. 1680–1741), second son of the 3rd Earl, he was additionally invested as Marquess of Bowmont and Cessford as well as Earl of Kelso and Viscount Broxmouth in 1707; the earlier titles held as Earl were also retained
- Robert Ker, 2nd Duke of Roxburghe (c. 1709–1755), only son of the 1st Duke, in 1722 he was created both Earl Ker and Baron Ker of Wakefield in the County of York
- John Ker, 3rd Duke of Roxburghe (1740–1804), elder son of the 2nd Duke inheriting the 1722 titles, died without issue
- William Bellenden-Ker, 4th Duke of Roxburghe (1728–1805), grandson of Lord Bellenden of Broughton (created 1661) who was the fourth and youngest son of the 2nd Earl, died without issue and the Roxburghe titles went dormant until 1812
- James Innes-Ker, 5th Duke of Roxburghe (1736–1823), great-grandson of Hon. Margaret Ker (died 1681), daughter of Hon. Henry Ker, Lord Ker (died 1642/3), the younger son of the 1st Earl
- James Innes-Ker, 6th Duke of Roxburghe (1816–1879), only son of the 5th Duke, he was created Earl Innes in the peerage of the United Kingdom in 1837
- James Henry Robert Innes-Ker, 7th Duke of Roxburghe (1839–1892), elder son of the 6th Duke
- Henry John Innes-Ker, 8th Duke of Roxburghe (1876–1932), eldest son of the 7th Duke
- George Victor Robert John Innes-Ker, 9th Duke of Roxburghe (1913–1974), only son of the 8th Duke
- Guy David Innes-Ker, 10th Duke of Roxburghe (1954–2019), elder son of the 9th Duke
- Charles Robert George Innes-Ker, 11th Duke of Roxburghe (born 1981), eldest son of the 10th Duke

The current holder's son, Frederick Innes-Ker, Marquess of Bowmont and Cessford (born 2024) is heir apparent to his father's titles.

== Line of succession ==
- George Innes-Ker, 9th Duke of Roxburghe (1913-1974)
  - Guy Innes-Ker, 10th Duke of Roxburghe (1954-2019)
    - Charles Innes-Ker, 11th Duke of Roxburghe (born 1981)
      - (1) Frederick Charles Ian Innes-Ker, Marquess of Bowmont and Cessford (born 2024)
    - (2) Lord Edward Innes-Ker (born 1984)
      - (3) Arthur Henry Innes-Ker (born 2019)
    - (4) Lord George Innes-Ker (born 1996)
  - (5) Lord Robin Innes-Ker (born 1959)
    - (6) James Innes-Ker (born 1999)

== Family tree ==
Ker and Innes-Ker family tree: Earls of Roxburghe and Dukes of Roxburghe family tree

Lord Roxburghe, 1600; Earl of Roxburghe and Lord Ker of Cessford and Cavertoun, 1616
Robert Ker; 1570–1650; 1st Earl of Roxburghe, etc.	Margaret Ker
Lord Bellenden, of Broughton, 1661
William Ker d. 1643 styled Lord Ker	Lady Jean Ker	Henry Ker d. 1643 styled Lord Ker	William Bellenden d. 1671; 1st Lord Bellenden
William Drummond (Ker); 1622–1675; 2nd Earl of Roxburghe, etc.	Jean Ker	Margaret Ker d. 1681	James Innes; 3rd Innes Baronet
Robert Ker; 1658–1682; 3rd Earl of Roxburghe, etc.	John Ker (Bellenden) d. 1707; 2nd Lord Bellenden	Henry Innes d. 1721; 4th Innes Baronet
Duke of Roxburghe, Marquess of Bowmont and Cessford, Earl of Kelso, Viscount Broxmouth, 1707
Robert Ker c. 1677–1696; 4th Earl of Roxburghe, etc.	John Ker; 1680–1741; 1st Duke of Roxburghe, etc., 5th Earl of Roxburghe, etc.	John Bellenden; 1685–1741; 3rd Lord Bellenden	William Bellenden; 1702–1758	Henry Innes d. 1762; 5th Innes Baronet
Earl Ker, of Wakefield in the County of York, and Baron Ker, of Wakefield in the County of York, 1722	Duke of Roxburghe, 1707 (succession decided, 1812)
Robert Ker c. 1709–1755; 2nd Duke of Roxburghe, etc., 6th Earl of Roxburghe, etc., 1st Earl Ker, etc.	Ker Bellenden; 1725–1753; 4th Lord Bellenden	Robert Bellenden; 1734–1797; 6th Lord Bellenden	William Bellenden-Ker; 1728–1805; 4th Duke of Roxburghe, etc., 8th Earl of Roxburghe, etc. 7th Lord Bellenden	James Innes-Ker; 1736–1823; 5th Duke of Roxburghe, etc., 9th Earl of Roxburghe, etc. 6th Innes-Ker Baronet
Lordship Bellenden extinct, 1805
Earl Innes, 1837
John Ker; 1740–1804; 3rd Duke of Roxburghe, etc., 7th Earl of Roxburghe, etc., 2nd Earl Ker, etc.	John Ker Bellenden; 1751–1796; 5th Lord Bellenden	James Henry Robert Innes-Ker; 1816–1879; 6th Duke of Roxburghe, etc., 10th Earl of Roxburghe, etc., 1st Earl Innes; 7th Innes-Ker Baronet
Dukedom dormant, Earldom Ker and Barony Ker extinct, 1804
James Henry Robert Innes-Ker; 1839–1892; 7th Duke of Roxburghe, etc., 11th Earl of Roxburghe, etc., 2nd Earl Innes; 8th Innes-Ker Baronet
Henry John Innes-Ker; 1876–1932; 8th Duke of Roxburghe, etc., 12th Earl of Roxburghe, etc., 3rd Earl Innes; 9th Innes-Ker Baronet
George Victor Robert John Innes-Ker; 1913–1974; 9th Duke of Roxburghe, etc., 13th Earl of Roxburghe, etc., 4th Earl Innes; 10th Innes-Ker Baronet
Guy David Innes-Ker; 1954–2019; 10th Duke of Roxburghe, etc., 14th Earl of Roxburghe, etc., 5th Earl Innes; 11th Innes-Ker Baronet
Charles Robert George Innes-Ker b. 1981; 11th Duke of Roxburghe, etc., 15th Earl of Roxburghe, etc., 6th Earl Innes; 12th Innes-Ker Baronet
Frederick Charles Ian Innes-Ker b. 2024 styled Marquess of Bowmont and Cessford
Heir apparent to the Dukedom of Roxburghe, etc.

== See also ==
- Clan Innes
- Roxburgh Castle
- Castle Holydean
- Earl of Perth
- Earl of Melfort
- An 1810 auction of the Duke's library is featured in Susanna Clarke's novel Jonathan Strange & Mr. Norrell
