= Treasurer of Scotland =

Historical government position in Scotland

The Treasurer was a senior post in the pre-Union government of Scotland, the Privy Council of Scotland.

== Lord Treasurer ==
The full title of the post was Lord High Treasurer, Comptroller, Collector-General and Treasurer of the New Augmentation, formed as it was from the amalgamation of four earlier offices. Of these, the Treasurer and Comptroller had originated in 1425 when the Chamberlain's financial functions were transferred to them. From 1466 the Comptroller had sole responsibility for financing the royal household to which certain revenues (the property) were appropriated, with the Treasurer being responsible for the remaining revenue (the casualty) and other expenditure. The Collector-General, created in 1562, handled the Crown's revenue from the thirds of benefices, and the Treasurer of the New Augmentation was responsible for the former church lands annexed to the Crown in 1587.

From 1581 Elizabeth I sent James VI an annual sum of money. In February 1599 the Privy Council declared that the Treasurer would administer this English subsidy, spending it on clothes for the royal family and the household of Prince Henry. In previous years the goldsmith Thomas Foulis and cloth merchant Robert Jousie accounted this money.

All four offices were held by the same person from 1610 onwards, but their separate titles survived the effective merging of their functions in 1635. From 1667 to 1682 the Treasury was in commission, and again from 1686 to 1708, when the separate Scottish Treasury was abolished. From 1690 the Crown nominated one person to sit in Parliament as Treasurer.

The Treasurer-depute was also a senior post in the pre-Union government of Scotland. It was the equivalent of the English post of Chancellor of the Exchequer.

Originally a deputy to the Treasurer, the Treasurer-depute emerged as a separate Crown appointment by 1614. Its holder attended the Privy Council in the absence of the Treasurer, but gained independent membership of the Council in 1587 and sat in the Parliament of Scotland as a Great Officer of State in 1593 and from 1617 onwards.

== List of treasurers ==
The following have been identified as treasurers of Scotland.

1420	Sir Walter Ogilvie of Lintrethan
	Thomas de Myrton, Dean of Glasgow Cathedral
1430	Patrick de Ogilvie
1433	Walter Stewart, Dean of Moray
1437	Sir Walter de Haliburton, Knt.
	Robert Livingston, son of Sir Alexander Livingston of Callendar, Governor of the Kingdom
1440	Walter de Haliburton, 1st Lord Haliburton of Dirleton
1449	Andrew Hunter, Abbot of Melrose
1455	James Stewart, Dean of Moray
1466	Sir William Knowlys, Preceptor of Torphichen Preceptory
1473	John Laing, parson of Kenland
1480	Archibald Crawford, Abbot of Holyrood
	Sir John Ramsay of Balmaine
1490	Henry Arnot, Abbot of Cambuskenneth
1499	Sir Robert Lundie of Balgony
1507	David Beaton of Creich
1509	George Hepburn, Abbot of Arbroath, later Bishop of the Isles
	Andrew Stewart, Bishop of Caithness
1512	Cuthbert Baillie, Commendator of Glenluce
1515	James Hepburn, Bishop of Moray
1516	Sir Walter Ogilvie of Strathearn.
1517	John Campbell of Lundy
1520	Archibald Douglas of Kilspindie
1526	William Cunningham, 4th Earl of Glencairn (26 June 1526 – 29 October 1526)
1528	Robert Cairncross, Abbot of Holyrood, later Bishop of Ross
1529	Sir Robert Barton of Over Barnton
1530	William Stewart, Bishop of Aberdeen
1537	Robert Cairncross, Abbot of Holyrood
1538	Sir James Kirkcaldy of Grange (Hallyards, Fife)
1546	John Hamilton, brother of Regent, Abbot of Paisley, later Bishop of St Andrews
1555	Gilbert Kennedy, 3rd Earl of Cassilis
1561	Robert Richardson, Commendator of St Mary Isle
1564	William Stewart, Provost of Lincluden
1571	William Ruthven, 1st Earl of Gowrie
1584	John Graham, 3rd Earl of Montrose
1585	Sir Thomas Lyon of Auldbar and Baldukie, Master of Glamis
1595	Walter Stewart, 1st Lord Blantyre
1599	Alexander Elphinstone, 4th Lord Elphinstone
1601	Sir George Hume, 1st Earl of Dunbar, first holder of the four combined treasury offices.
1611	Sir Robert Carr, Earl of Somerset
1616	John Erskine, 2nd Earl of Mar
3 April 1630	William Douglas, 7th Earl of Morton
21 May 1636	John Stewart, 1st Earl of Traquair
17 November 1641	in commission
	John Campbell, 1st Earl of Loudoun, Lord Chancellor
	Archibald Campbell, 1st Marquess of Argyll
	William Cunningham, 9th Earl of Glencairn
	John Lindsay, 1st Earl of Lindsay
	Sir James Carmichael
23 July 1644	John Lindsay, 1st Earl of Lindsay, Earl of Crawford from 1652, dismissed 13 February 1649
1660	in commission
	John Lindsay, Earl of Crawford and Lindsay
	John Leslie, 7th Earl of Rothes
19 January 1661	John Lindsay reappointed
4 June 1663	John Leslie, 7th Earl of Rothes - appointed Chancellor 16 April 1667
20 June 1667	in commission
	John Leslie, 7th Earl of Rothes, Lord Chancellor
	John Maitland, 2nd Earl of Lauderdale
	John Hay, 2nd Earl of Tweeddale
	Alexander Bruce, 2nd Earl of Kincardine
	John, Lord Cochrane (eldest son of Earl of Dundonald)
	Sir Robert Murray, Lord Justice Clerk
1674	in commission
	John Leslie, 7th Earl of Rothes, Lord Chancellor
	John Maitland, 2nd Earl of Lauderdale
	John Cochrane, 2nd Earl of Dundonald
	Colin Lindsay, 3rd Earl of Balcarres
	Charles Maitland, Deputy Treasurer and Master of the Mint
1 May 1682	William Douglas, 1st Marquess of Queensberry, later Duke of Queensberry
24 February 1686	in commission
	William Douglas, 1st Duke of Queensberry,
	James Drummond, 4th Earl of Perth, Lord Chancellor
	William Hamilton, Duke of Hamilton
	John Keith, 1st Earl of Kintore, Treasurer Depute
	George Mackenzie, Viscount Tarbat, Lord Clerk Register
	William Drummond, later Viscount Strathallan
1687	in commission
	James Drummond, 4th Earl of Perth, Lord Chancellor
	John Murray, 1st Marquess of Atholl, Lord Privy Seal
	William Hamilton, Duke of Hamilton
	George Gordon, 1st Duke of Gordon
	John Hay, 2nd Earl of Tweeddale
	Colin Lindsay, 3rd Earl of Balcarres
	George Mackenzie, Viscount Tarbat
	William Drummond
	Richard, Viscount Maitland, eldest son to the Earl of Lauderdale, Treasurer Depute.
1689	in commission
	William Lindsay, 18th Earl of Crawford
	John Kennedy, 7th Earl of Cassilis
	John Hay, 2nd Earl of Tweeddale
	David Ruthven, 2nd Lord Ruthven of Freeland
	Alexander Melville, (Note: Commissioner nominated to sit as Treasurer in Parliament.) eldest son to the Earl of Melville
1692	in commission
	John Hay, 2nd Earl of Tweeddale, Chancellor
	James Douglas, Earl of Drumlanrig, eldest son to the Duke of Queensberry
	John Kennedy, 7th Earl of Cassilis
	George Livingston, 4th Earl of Linlithgow
	John Campbell, 1st Earl of Breadalbane and Holland
	Alexander, Lord Raith, treasurer-depute
1695	in commission
	John Hay, 1st Marquess of Tweeddale, Chancellor
	James Douglas, Earl of Drumlanrig
	John Kennedy, 7th Earl of Cassilis
	George Livingston, 4th Earl of Linlithgow
	John Campbell, 1st Earl of Breadalbane and Holland
	John, Lord Yester, eldest son of the Marquess of Tweeddale
30 January 1696	in commission
	John Hay, 1st Marquess of Tweeddale, Chancellor
	James Douglas, 2nd Duke of Queensberry
	Archibald Campbell, 10th Earl of Argyll
	William Johnstone, 2nd Earl of Annandale and Hartfell
	Alexander, Lord Raith, treasurer-depute
	Sir John Maxwell, 1st Baronet
24 May 1696	in commission
	Patrick, Lord Polwarth, Lord Chancellor; James Douglas, 2nd Duke of Queensberry; Archibald Campbell, 10th Earl of Argyll; William Johnstone, 2nd Earl of Annandale and Hartfell; Alexander Hume, treasurer-depute Sir John Maxwell, 1st Baronet
1698	in commission
	Patrick Hume, 1st Earl of Marchmont, Lord Chancellor; James Douglas, 2nd Duke of Queensberry; Archibald Campbell, 10th Earl of Argyll; William Johnstone, 2nd Earl of Annandale and Hartfell; Adam Cockburn of Ormiston, treasurer-depute Sir John Maxwell, 1st Baronet
1702	in commission
	James Ogilvy, 1st Earl of Seafield, Lord Chancellor; James Douglas, 2nd Duke of Queensberry; Archibald Campbell, 10th Earl of Argyll; William Johnstone, 2nd Earl of Annandale and Hartfell; Alexander Montgomerie, 9th Earl of Eglinton; Hugh Campbell, 3rd Earl of Loudoun; David Boyle, Lord Boyle, treasurer-depute David Wemyss, Lord Elcho
1703	in commission
	James Ogilvy, Earl of Seafield, Lord Chancellor; James Douglas, 2nd Duke of Queensberry; Archibald, Duke of Argyll; William Johnstone, 1st Marquess of Annandale; Alexander Montgomerie, 9th Earl of Eglinton; Hugh Campbell, 3rd Earl of Loudoun; David Boyle, Lord Boyle; Francis Montgomerie
1704	in commission
	John Hay, 1st Marquess of Tweeddale, Lord Chancellor; William Johnstone, 1st Marquess of Annandale; Hugh Campbell, 3rd Earl of Loudoun; Charles Douglas, 2nd Earl of Selkirk; John Hamilton, 2nd Lord Belhaven and Stenton; George Baillie, treasurer-depute Francis Montgomerie; Sir John Hume, baronet
1705	in commission
	James Ogilvy, 1st Earl of Seafield, Lord Chancellor; James Douglas, 2nd Duke of Queensberry; James Graham, 1st Duke of Montrose; James Stewart, 5th Earl of Galloway; David Carnegie, 4th Earl of Northesk; Archibald Douglas, 1st Earl of Forfar; David Boyle, 1st Earl of Glasgow, treasurer-depute Lord Archibald Campbell; William Ross, 12th Lord Ross; Francis Montgomerie
1706	in commission
	James Ogilvy, 1st Earl of Seafield, Lord Chancellor; James Graham, 1st Duke of Montrose; James Douglas, 2nd Duke of Queensberry; David Carnegie, 4th Earl of Northesk; Archibald Douglas, 1st Earl of Forfar; David Boyle, 1st Earl of Glasgow, treasurer-depute William Ross, 12th Lord Ross; Francis Montgomerie
1707	in commission
	James Ogilvy, 1st Earl of Seafield, Lord Chancellor; James Graham, 1st Duke of Montrose, president of the privy council James Douglas, 2nd Duke of Queensberry, keeper of the privy seal David Boyle, 1st Earl of Glasgow, treasurer-depute William Ross, 12th Lord Ross; Francis Montgomerie

== Accounts of the Lord High Treasurer ==
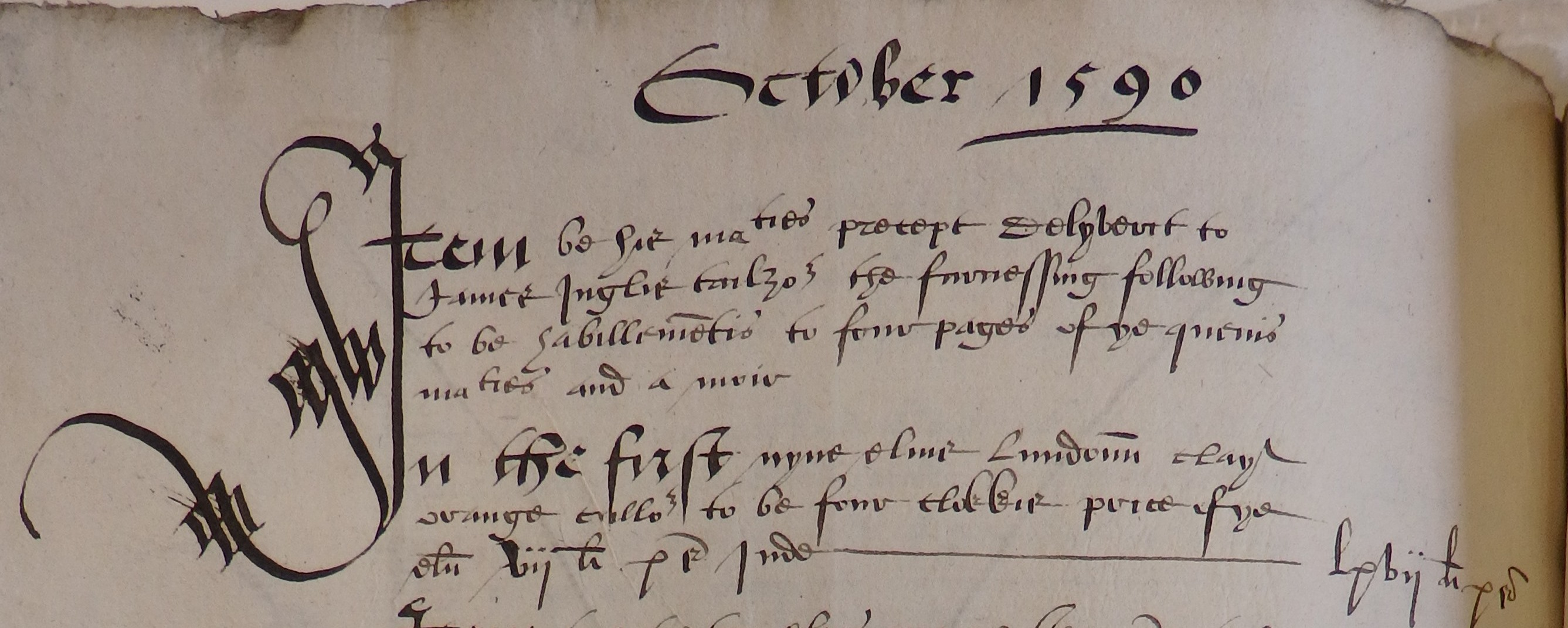
Entry in a duplicate treasurer's account for clothes made for four pages and an African servant of Anne of Denmark, known as the "Moir" in October 1590, National Records of Scotland.

The final audited accounts of the Lord High Treasurer were public records of Scotland. These survive as an almost complete record from 1473 to 1635 at the National Archives of Scotland in Edinburgh. Even the early accounts were written on paper rather than vellum. The Scots language was preferred over Latin for the expenditure or "discharge" side. The income, of rents and feudal duties, especially the fees on property transactions known as "compositions", was written in Latin. The record of expenses varies considerably over the reigns. For example, as Regent, Mary of Guise paid for her stable, costume, and wardrobe separately and these expenses do not occur in her treasurer's accounts.

There are also surviving duplicate volumes for the years 1574 to 1596. These volumes were kept for many years by the family of the Earl of Leven and Melville, and were deposited in the National Archives of Scotland in 1944. Their exact purpose in royal accounting remains unclear. The layout of these duplicate accounts and the wording of the entries is not an exact replica of the main series. Other surviving material includes a number of precepts and receipts for the accounts, known as "vouchers".

The manuscripts were published between 1877 and 1978 in thirteen volumes covering up to 1580. The editors silently abbreviated and omitted some material, especially details of making costume.

Historians often refer to the published volumes in references as TA:

- Accounts of the Lord High Treasurer of Scotland, 1473–1498, vol. 1, HM General Register House, (Edinburgh, 1877).
- Accounts of the Lord High Treasurer of Scotland, 1506-1507, HM Register House, vol. 3 (Edinburgh, 1901)..
- Accounts of the Lord High Treasurer of Scotland, 1507-1513, HM Register House, vol. 4 (Edinburgh, 1902).
- Accounts of the Lord High Treasurer of Scotland, 1515-1531, HM Register House, vol. 5 (Edinburgh, 1903).
- Accounts of the Lord High Treasurer of Scotland, 1531-1538, HM Register House, vol. 6 (Edinburgh, 1905).
- Accounts of the Lord High Treasurer of Scotland, 1538-1541, HM Register House, vol. 7 (Edinburgh, 1907).
- Accounts of the Lord High Treasurer of Scotland, 1541-1546, HM Register House, vol. 8, (Edinburgh, 1908)
- Accounts of the Treasurer of Scotland, 1566–1574, vol. 12, Scottish Record Office, (1970)
- Accounts of the Treasurer of Scotland, 1574–1580, vol. 13, Scottish Record Office, (1978)
