= Cuthbert Baillie =

Cuthbert Baillie (died in 1514), was the lord high treasurer of Scotland.

Baillie was, according to one authority, a natural son of Sir William Baillie of Lamington, one of the favourites of James III; and there are some other reasons for doubting the contradictory statement that he was a descendant of the house of Carphin. His first incumbency was that of Thankerton. In the charter granted him of the five merk lands of Lockhart Hill, Lanarkshire, his name occurs as Cuthbert Baillie, clericus. He became Commendator of Glenluce, but the hitherto current statement that he was rector of Cumnock is an error which seems to have arisen from confounding his name with Cuthbert of Dunbar, who received a grant of lands in Cumnock. In the 'Register of the Great Seal' Thomas Campbell is mentioned as rector of Cumnock in 1481, and in the 'Protocola Diœcesis Glasguensis' his name occurs as prebendary of Cumnock under date 11 June 1511. Cuthbert Baillie under the same date is mentioned as prebendary of Sanquhar, and the same title is given to him in 1508 and 1511 in the 'Register of the Great Seal.' He entered upon the duties of lord high treasurer on 29 October 1512, and died in 1514.
