= Henry Moore, 1st Earl of Drogheda =

Anglo-Irish peer, politician and soldier

Henry Moore, 1st Earl of Drogheda PC (I) (died 11 January 1676) was an Anglo-Irish peer, politician and soldier.

== Early life ==
Moore was the son of Charles Moore, 2nd Viscount Moore of Drogheda, by his wife Hon. Alice Loftus, the youngest daughter of Adam Loftus, 1st Viscount Loftus.

== Career ==
He served in the Irish House of Commons as the Member of Parliament for Ardee between 1639 and 1643, when he succeeded to his father's viscountcy. He became a Royalist Colonel of Horse and served as Governor of Meath and Louth in 1643. Moore served in the forces of Confederate Ireland and fought at the Battle of Dungan's Hill in August 1647. In 1653 he was forced to pay £6,953 to the Commonwealth government in order to retain his estates under the Act for the Settlement of Ireland 1652. Following the Restoration he was made Governor of Drogheda in 1660 and invested as a member of the Privy Council of Ireland. On 14 June 1661, he was created Earl of Drogheda in the Peerage of Ireland.

== Personal life ==
He married Hon. Alice Spencer, sister of Henry Spencer, 1st Earl of Sunderland and the fifth daughter of William Spencer, 2nd Baron Spencer and Lady Penelope Wriothesley. They had five children, including:

- Charles Moore, 2nd Earl of Drogheda (d. 1679) who married Lady Letitia Isabella Robartes, eldest daughter of the 1st Earl of Radnor.
- Henry Hamilton-Moore, 3rd Earl of Drogheda (d. 1714), who married Mary Cole, daughter of Sir John Cole, 1st Baronet and Elizabeth Chichester (a granddaughter of the 1st Viscount Chichester). Mary was a sister of the 1st Baron Ranelagh.
- Hon. William Moore, who married Elizabeth Lennard, daughter of Francis Lennard, 14th Lord Dacre and Elizabeth Bayning, suo jure Countess of Sheppey, in 1686.
- Lady Mary Moore (d. c. 1725), who married William Ramsay, 3rd Earl of Dalhousie, son of George Ramsay, 2nd Earl of Dalhousie. After his death, she married John Bellenden, 2nd Lord Bellenden, son of William Ker, 2nd Earl of Roxburghe, in 1683. After his death, she married Samuel Collins.
- Lady Alice Moore (d. 1677), who married Henry Hamilton, 2nd Earl of Clanbrassil, son of James Hamilton, 1st Earl of Clanbrassil, in 1667. After his death, she married John Hamilton, 2nd Lord Bargany, son of John Hamilton, 1st Lord Bargany, in 1677.
- Lady Penelope Moore, who married Randall Fleming, 16th Baron Slane.

He was succeeded in 1676 by his eldest son, Charles. His younger son Henry, who became the third Earl upon Charles's death in 1679—and assumed the name Henry Hamilton-Moore upon succeeding to the estates of his brother-in-law, Henry Hamilton, 2nd Earl of Clanbrassil—developed several streets in Dublin which still bear his name: Henry Street, Moore Street, North Earl Street, Of Lane (now "Off Lane"), (recorded as Henry Place on Ordnance Survey map of 2007 and on eircode.ie map of O'Connell Street 2024, C. T. McCready records it as Henry Place in Dublin Street Names, printed 1892) and Drogheda Street.

Alice outlived her husband by many years. She seems to have been a person of considerable strength of character. She was appointed guardian to her infant grandson Christopher Fleming, 17th Baron Slane (son of her daughter Penelope and the 16th Baron). She lobbied the Crown vigorously for restoration to her grandson of all lands forfeited by the Fleming family during the troubles of the 1640s and 1650s.

Peerage of Ireland
New creation	Earl of Drogheda; 1661–1676	Succeeded by Charles Moore
Preceded by Charles Moore	Viscount Moore; 1643–1676	Succeeded by Charles Moore
