= Robert Ker, 2nd Duke of Roxburghe =

Scottish peer

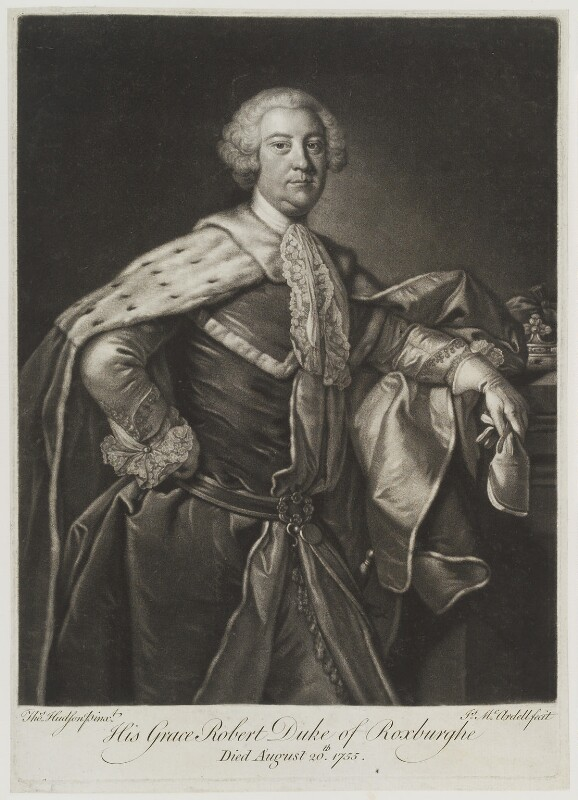
A portrait of Lord Roxburghe

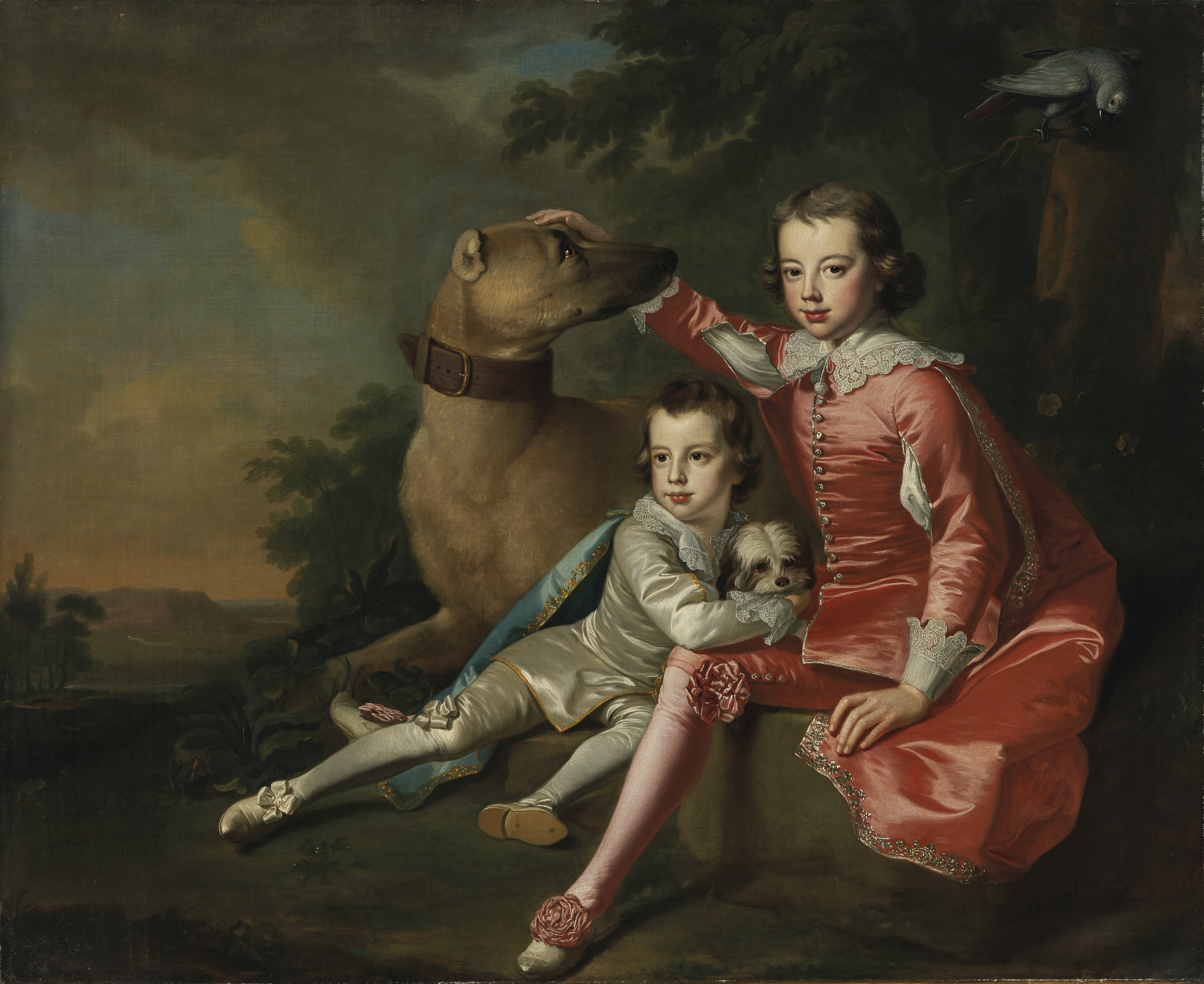
Ker's sons John and Robert

Robert Ker, 2nd Duke of Roxburghe (c. 1709 – 20 August 1755) was a Scottish peer.

Ker was the only son of the 1st Duke of Roxburghe and Lady Mary Finch, daughter of Daniel Finch, 2nd Earl of Nottingham, by his first wife Lady Essex Rich. On 24 May 1722 he was created Earl Ker, of Wakefield in the County of York, and Baron Ker, of Wakefield in the County of York (both in the Peerage of Great Britain). On 16 June 1739 he married his half-cousin Essex Mostyn, daughter of Sir Roger Mostyn, 3rd Baronet, and Essex Finch, daughter of above-mentioned Earl of Nottingham by his 2nd wife Hon. Anne Hatton. They had five children:

1. Lord John Ker, later 3rd Duke of Roxburghe
2. Lady Essex Ker (born 9 Mar 1742 – died an infant)
3. Lady Essex Ker (born 25 Mar 1744), a bridesmaid at Queen Charlotte's wedding 1761, died unmarried
4. Lady Mary Ker (born 17 Mar 1746), died unmarried
5. Lt. Col. Lord Robert Ker (27 Aug 1747 – 20 Mar 1781)

Robert Ker inherited his father's title in 1741 and died in 1755. He was succeeded by his eldest son John.

== Ancestry ==
Ancestors of Robert Ker, 2nd Duke of Roxburghe

16. John Drummond, 2nd Earl of Perth
8. William Ker, 2nd Earl of Roxburghe
17. Lady Jean Ker
4. Robert Ker, 3rd Earl of Roxburghe
18. Henry Ker, Lord Ker
9. Lady Jean Ker
19. Lady Margaret Hay
2. John Ker, 1st Duke of Roxburghe
20. John Hay, 1st Earl of Tweeddale
10. John Hay, 1st Marquess of Tweeddale
21. Lady Jean Seton
5. Lady Margaret Hay
22. Walter Scott, 1st Earl of Buccleuch
11. Lady Jean Scott
23. Lady Mary Hay
1. Robert Ker, 2nd Duke of Roxburghe
24. Sir Heneage Finch
12. Heneage Finch, 1st Earl of Nottingham
25. Frances Bell
6. Daniel Finch, 2nd Earl of Nottingham
26. Daniel or William; Harvey
13. Elizabeth Harvey
27. ?
3. Lady Mary Finch
28. Robert Rich, 2nd Earl of Warwick
14. Robert Rich, 3rd Earl of Warwick
29. Frances Hatton
7. Lady Essex Rich
30. Sir Thomas Cheeke
15. Anne Cheeke
31. Essex Rich

Peerage of Scotland
Preceded by John Ker	Duke of Roxburghe; 1741–1755	Succeeded by John Ker
Peerage of Great Britain
New creation	Earl Ker; 1722–1755	Succeeded by John Ker
