= James Innes-Ker, 5th Duke of Roxburghe =

Scottish nobleman (1736–1823)

His Grace The Duke of Roxburghe

Personal details
- Born: James Innes; 10 January 1736
- Died: 19 July 1823 (aged 87)
- Spouses: Mary Wray (m. 1769; died 1807) Harriet Charlewood (m. 1807)
- Relations: Sir Harry Innes, 4th Baronet (grandfather); Sir James Grant, 6th Baronet (grandfather); James Innes-Ker, 7th Duke of Roxburghe (grandson)
- Children: James Innes-Ker, 6th Duke of Roxburghe
- Parent(s): Sir Henry Innes, 5th Baronet; Anne Grant

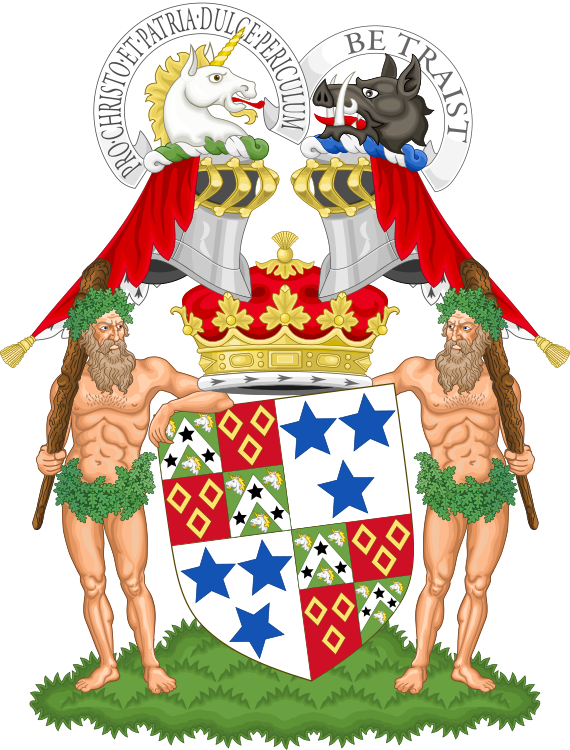
Coat of arms of the duke of Roxburghe

James Innes-Ker, 5th Duke of Roxburghe (born James Innes; 10 January 1736 – 19 July 1823) was a Scottish nobleman.

== Early life ==
He was the eldest surviving son of Sir Henry Innes, 5th Baronet (c. 1711–1762), and Anne Drummonda Grant (1711–1771). His grandfathers were Sir Harry Innes, 4th Baronet, who represented the Parliament of Scotland constituency of Elginshire from 1704 to 1707, and Sir James Grant, 6th Baronet, a Member of Parliament for Inverness-shire and Elgin Burghs.

Upon his father's death in 1762, he succeeded to the Innes baronetcy.

== Dukedom of Roxburghe ==
Through the Innes family, he was a descendant of Robert Ker, 1st Earl of Roxburghe, and in 1812 established his claim to the vacant Dukedom of Roxburghe. The fight for the succession of the title encompassed seven years of constant litigation; according to one biography, "seldom have the lawyers met with a richer harvest. The courts of Edinburgh and London have revelled in conflicting claims, and the House of Lords has been disturbed by never-ending appeals." On the demise of the 3rd Duke, who had never married, his principal titles, and large and productive estates, devolved on William Bellenden-Ker, 4th Duke of Roxburghe, who died shortly thereafter, without heirs. The succession was contested by Major-General Walter Ker and the Right Honorable William Drummond; and only at vast cost decided, on 11 May 1812, in favour of Sir James, as descended from Lady Innes, the third daughter of Hary, Lord Ker, son of the first Earl of Roxburghe.

Lord Bellenden was descended from the second earl; General Ker claimed to be heir male of the first, and Mr. Drummond heir male of the second Earl, so that the issue turned on the construction of an entail, which gave the right to the female line. Other claimants included John Bellenden Ker (c. 1765–1842), famous as a wit and botanist and the author of Archaeology of Popular Phrases and Nursery Rhymes (1837), whose son was the legal reformer Charles Henry Bellenden Ker (c. 1785–1871). It is notable that 25 years later, Walter Ker's daughter Essex Ker was involved in litigation against her father's lawyers in connection with bonds issued to cover the costs of the succession litigation.

== Personal life ==
James took the name Innes-Ker, and became the 5th Duke of Roxburghe. He married twice, first on 19 April 1769 to Mary Wray (1729/30–1807), the eldest daughter of Sir John Wray, 12th Baronet and sister of Sir Cecil Wray, 13th Baronet. His wife died in 1807 and he remarried to Harriet Charlewood on 28 July 1807. Harriet was a daughter of Benjamin Charlewood, of Windlesham, Surrey. Together, they were the parents of:

- James Henry Robert Innes-Ker (1816–1879), who married Susanna Stephania Dalbiac, the only child of Sir Charles Dalbiac.

Innes-Ker died on 19 July 1823, and was succeeded in the Dukedom by his only son from his second marriage. Four years after his death, his widow remarried to Lt Col Walter Frederick O'Reilly, CB of the Royal African Corps, on 14 November 1827.

=== Descendants and legacy ===
Through his son James, he was a grandfather of James Henry Robert Innes-Ker, 7th Duke of Roxburghe (1839–1892), who married Anne Emily Spencer-Churchill, daughter of the John Spencer-Churchill, 7th Duke of Marlborough.

Portraits of the Duke and his second Duchess were painted by Henry Raeburn, and hang in the entrance hall of the family seat of Floors Castle in the Scottish Borders.

Peerage of Scotland
Preceded by William Bellenden-Ker	Duke of Roxburghe; 1812–1823	Succeeded by James Innes-Ker
Baronetage of Nova Scotia
Preceded by Harry Innes	Baronet (of Innes); 1762–1823	Succeeded by James Innes-Ker
