= John Ker, 3rd Duke of Roxburghe =

Scottish courtier

His Grace The Duke of Roxburghe KG KT PC
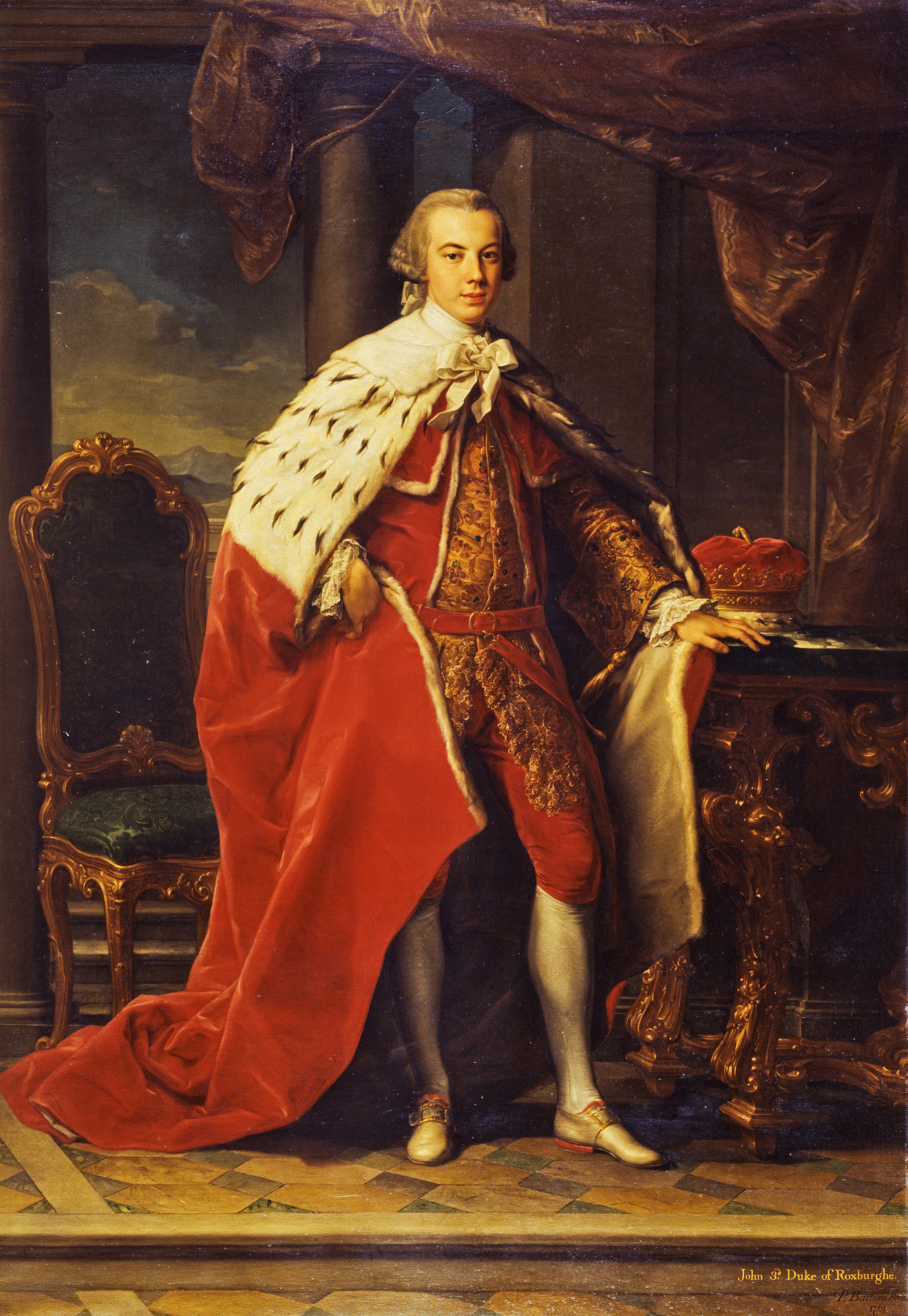
- Portrait by Pompeo Batoni, 1761
- Born: 23 April 1740
- Died: March 19, 1804 (aged 63); London, UK
- Parent(s): Robert Ker, 2nd Duke of Roxburghe; Essex Mostyn

Signature
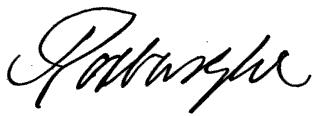

John Ker, 3rd Duke of Roxburghe, KG, KT, PC (23 April 1740 – 19 March 1804) was a Scottish courtier.

== Early life ==
Born in Hanover Square, London, on 23 April 1740, Ker succeeded his father to become the 3rd Duke of Roxburghe in 1755. During his Grand Tour in 1761 he fell in love with Duchess Christiane of Mecklenburg, eldest daughter of Duke Charles Louis Frederick of Mecklenburg. This would have been a perfect match of social equals. Shortly afterwards a younger sister, Charlotte of Mecklenburg-Strelitz, became engaged to King George III. It was considered bad etiquette for an older sister to marry someone of lower rank than a younger sister. For whatever reason, both John Ker and Christiane separated and remained single for the rest of their lives. If George III recognised the sacrifice that Ker had made, it was with the high positions the king rewarded Ker with at court. He was Lord of the Bedchamber from 1767, was appointed a Knight of the Thistle in 1768. In 1796 he was appointed Groom of the Stole and made a Privy Counsellor. He was appointed a Knight of the Garter in 1801.

== Bibliophile ==
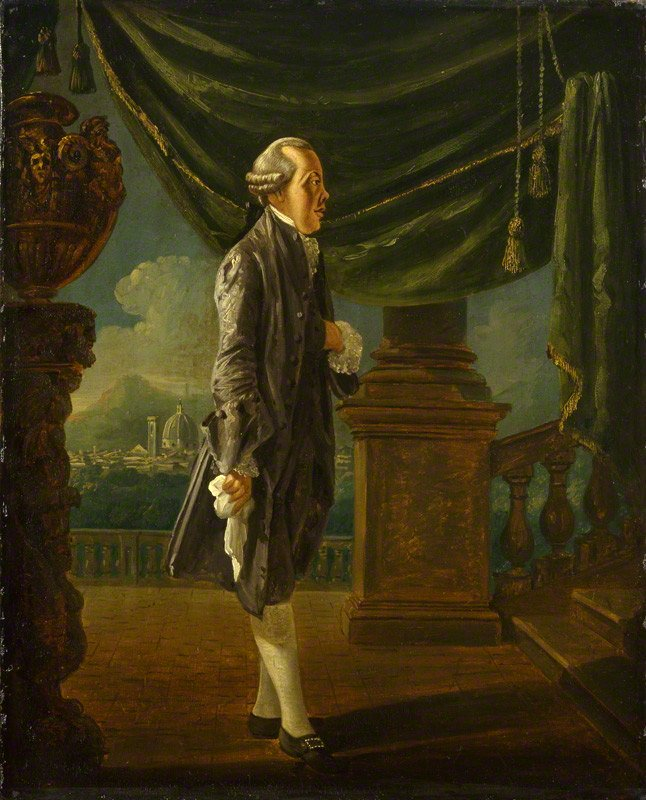
c. 1761 portrait of Roxburghe by Thomas Patch

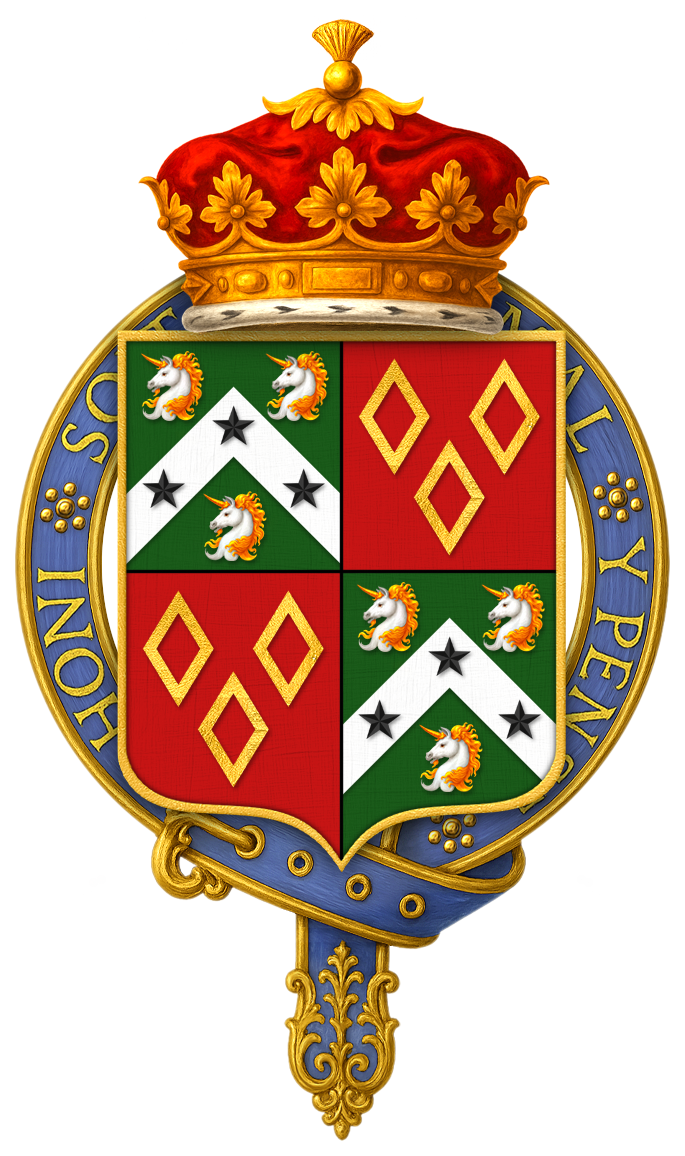
Shield of arms of John Ker, 3rd Duke of Roxburghe, KG, KT, PC

While in Italy, Ker saw a first edition of Boccaccio's Decameron, often called the Valdarfers edition. This was a fabled book, which many said did not exist. He paid 100 guineas for it and showed it to his friends in London to huge acclaim. For the next 40 years he collected ancient and curious books, particularly editions of Shakespeare's works and other works which merely mentioned Shakespeare. At his death in 1804 there were 10,000 items. Most were books, but there were also pamphlets and broadside ballad sheets. His library was auctioned in 1812, leading to the formation of the Roxburghe Club. His collection of ballads were later published as the Roxburghe Ballads.

He died unmarried and childless, and the titles Earl Ker and Baron Ker, which had been created for his father in 1722 in the Peerage of Great Britain, became extinct. His cousin William Bellenden, 7th Lord Bellenden succeeded to the dukedom and all of its other subsidiary titles.

== In popular culture ==
In Jonathan Strange and Mr. Norrell, a 2004 novel by British writer Susanna Clarke, the Duke's affection for the Queen's sister and their subsequent separation are mentioned, and made a premise for an important aspect of the story. One of the title characters, Gilbert Norrell, had a longstanding wish to examine the books of the Duke's library, believing there to be magical texts within. The Duke, being a bibliophile and rich, saw no reason to allow Mr. Norrell the opportunity, and so upon the Duke's death, the new Duke puts the library up for sale in order to pay off court debts. The Duke's library contained several extremely rare and valuable tomes, which Mr. Norrell purchases at auction, causing an increase in friction between himself and Jonathan Strange.

== Ancestry ==
Ancestors of John Ker, 3rd Duke of Roxburghe

16. William Ker, 2nd Earl of Roxburghe
8. Robert Ker, 3rd Earl of Roxburghe
17. Lady Jean Ker
4. John Ker, 1st Duke of Roxburghe
18. John Hay, 1st Marquess of Tweeddale
9. Lady Margaret Hay
19. Lady Jean Scott
2. Robert Ker, 2nd Duke of Roxburghe
20. Heneage Finch, 1st Earl of Nottingham
10. Daniel Finch, 2nd Earl of Nottingham
21. Elizabeth Harvey
5. Lady Mary Finch
22. Robert Rich, 3rd Earl of Warwick
11. Lady Essex Rich
23. Anne Cheeke
1. John Ker, 3rd Duke of Roxburghe
24. Sir Roger Mostyn, 1st Baronet, of Mostyn
12. Sir Thomas Mostyn, 2nd Baronet, of Mostyn
25. Hon. Mary Bulkeley
6. Sir Roger Mostyn, 3rd Baronet, of Mostyn
26. D'arcy Savage
13. Bridget Savage
3. Essex Mostyn
28. Heneage Finch, 1st Earl of Nottingham
14. Daniel Finch, 2nd Earl of Nottingham
29. Elizabeth Harvey
7. Lady Essex Finch
30. Christopher Hatton, 1st Viscount Hatton
15. Hon. Anne Hatton
31. Lady Cecily Tufton

== Bibliography ==
- Dibdin, Rev. Thomas Frognall. Reminiscences of a Literary Life. 2 vols. (Vol I, Vol II). London: John Major, 1836.

Court offices
Preceded by The Earl of Buckinghamshire	Lord of the Bedchamber; 1767–1796	Succeeded by The Earl of Macclesfield
Preceded by The Marquess of Bath	Groom of the Stole; 1796–1804	Succeeded by The Earl of Winchilsea and Nottingham
Honorary titles
New office	Lord Lieutenant of Roxburghshire; 1794–1804	Succeeded by The Duke of Buccleuch
Peerage of Scotland
Preceded by Robert Ker	Duke of Roxburghe; 1755–1804	Succeeded by William Bellenden
Peerage of Great Britain
Preceded by Robert Ker	Earl Ker; 1755–1804	Extinct
