= John Ker, 1st Duke of Roxburghe =

British politician (1680–1741)

His Grace The Duke of Roxburghe KG PC FRS
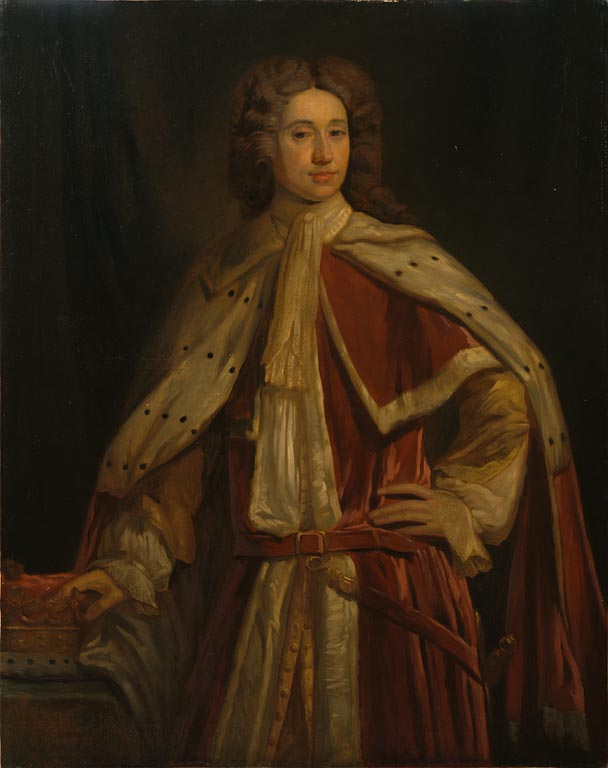

Secretary of State for Scotland
- In office 1716–1725
- Preceded by: The Duke of Montrose
- Succeeded by: Vacant

Keeper of the Privy Seal of Scotland
- In office 1707–1741
- Preceded by: The Duke of Atholl
- Succeeded by: The Marquess of Annandale

Personal details
- Born: 30 April 1680
- Died: 27 February 1741 (aged 60)
- Spouse: Lady Mary Finch (m. 1707; died 1718)
- Parent(s): Robert Ker, 3rd Earl of Roxburghe; Margaret Hay
- Relatives: Robert Ker, 4th Earl of Roxburghe (brother); John Hay, 1st Marquess of Tweeddale (grandfather)

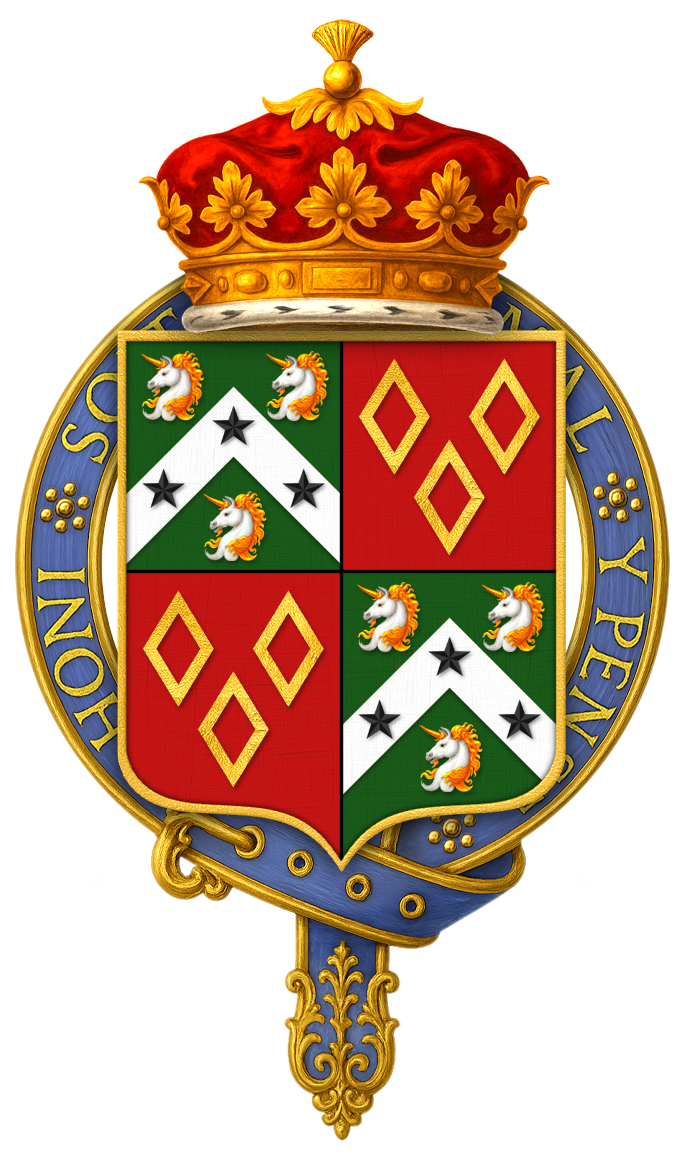
Coat of arms of John Ker, 1st Duke of Roxburghe, KG, PC, FRS

John Ker, 1st Duke of Roxburghe, KG, PC, FRS (30 April 1680 – 27 February 1741) was a British politician.

== Early life ==
Ker was born on 30 April 1680. He was the second son of Robert Ker, 3rd Earl of Roxburghe, and Margaret Hay, daughter of John Hay, 1st Marquess of Tweeddale. His older brother was Robert Ker, 4th Earl of Roxburghe, and his younger brother was The Hon. William Ker, who fought on the Continent under the Duke of Marlborough and was present at the Battle of Sheriffmuir. He served as Groom of the Bedchamber to the Prince of Wales in 1714, and was a Member of Parliament for Berwick and Dysart Burghs.

John became 5th Earl of Roxburghe on the death of his elder brother Robert in 1696.

== Career ==
In 1704, he was made a Secretary of State of Scotland, and he helped to bring about the union with England, being created Duke of Roxburghe in 1707 for his services in this connection. This was the last creation in the Scottish peerage. On 28 May 1707, he was admitted a FRS.

The duke was a Scottish representative peer in four parliaments. George I made him a privy councillor and Keeper of the Privy Seal of Scotland, and he was loyal to the king during the Jacobite rising in 1715. He served as Secretary of State for Scotland in the British Parliament from 1716 to 1725, but he opposed the malt tax, and in 1725 Sir Robert Walpole procured his dismissal from office.

In April 1727, he was one of the six pall-bearers of Sir Isaac Newton's coffin at Westminster Abbey. He was one of the original governors of the Foundling Hospital, a charity created by royal charter on 17 October 1739.

== Personal life ==
On 1 January 1707/8, Roxburghe was married to widow Lady Mary Savile (née Finch). Lady Mary was the only child of Daniel Finch, 7th Earl of Winchilsea by his first wife Lady Essex Rich. From her first marriage to William Savile, 2nd Marquess of Halifax, she was the mother of Lady Mary Savile (who married Sackville Tufton, 7th Earl of Thanet in 1722) and Lady Dorothy Savile (who married Richard Boyle, 3rd Earl of Burlington). Lady Mary enjoyed some influence. She was able to get her friend Mary Bellenden a position as a maid of honour to Caroline, princess of Wales in 1715.

Together, John and Mary were the parents of:

- Robert Ker (c. 1709–1755), who married his half-cousin Essex Mostyn, eldest daughter of Sir Roger Mostyn, 3rd Baronet and Lady Essex Finch (half sister of Lady Mary).

The Duchess of Roxburghe died on 19 September 1718 and the Duke died on 27 February 1741. He was buried first in his family vault beneath Bowden Kirk. Later his remains were relocated to the Roxburghe Aisle attached to Kelso Abbey. Upon his death, his only son, who had been created Earl Ker of Wakefield in 1722, became 2nd duke.

== Ancestry ==
Ancestors of John Ker, 1st Duke of Roxburghe

8. John Drummond, 2nd Earl of Perth
4. William Ker, 2nd Earl of Roxburghe
9. Lady Jean Ker
2. Robert Ker, 3rd Earl of Roxburghe
10. Henry Ker, Lord Ker
5. Lady Jean Ker
11. Lady Margaret Hay
1. John Ker, 1st Duke of Roxburghe
12. John Hay, 1st Earl of Tweeddale
6. John Hay, 1st Marquess of Tweeddale
13. Lady Jean Seton
3. Lady Margaret Hay
14. Walter Scott, 1st Earl of Buccleuch
7. Lady Jean Scott
15. Lady Mary Hay

Political offices
Preceded by The Duke of Montrose	Secretary of State for Scotland; 1716–1725	Unknown
Preceded by The Duke of Atholl	Keeper of the Privy Seal of Scotland; 1714–1715	Succeeded by The Marquess of Annandale
Peerage of Scotland
New creation	Duke of Roxburghe; 1707–1741	Succeeded by Robert Ker
Preceded by Robert Ker	Earl of Roxburghe; 1696–1741	Succeeded by Robert Ker
