= Treasurer-depute =

The Treasurer-depute was a senior post in the pre-Union government of Scotland. It was the equivalent of the English post of Chancellor of the Exchequer.

Originally a deputy to the Treasurer, the Treasurer-depute became a distinct Crown appointment in the early 17th century.. Although originally serving as a deputy to the Treasurer, the office-holder gained independent membership in the Privy Council in 1587, before the position became a distinct Crown appointment in the early 17th century. and sat in the Parliament of Scotland as a Great Officer of State in 1593 and from 1617 onwards.

== List of treasurers-depute ==
- 1547 James Forrester
- 1584: Sir Robert Melville
- 1604–1610: Sir John Arnot
- 1610–1621: Gideon Murray
- 1622–1631: Archibald Napier, 1st Lord Napier
- 1631–?: John Stewart, 1st Earl of Traquair
- 1636-1649: Sir James Carmichael
- 1661–1671: William Bellenden, 1st Lord Bellenden
- 1671–1682?: Charles Maitland, Lord Haltoun
- 1682–1684: John Drummond
- 1684–1686?: John Keith, 1st Earl of Kintore
- 1687–1689: Richard Maitland, Viscount Maitland
- 1690–1698: Alexander Melville, Lord Raith
- 1699–1703: Adam Cockburn of Ormiston, Lord Ormiston
- 1703: David Boyle, 1st Earl of Glasgow
