= William Ker, 2nd Earl of Roxburghe =

Scottish nobleman (1622–1675)

The Right Honourable The Earl of Roxburghe PC

Personal details
- Born: William Drummond; 1622
- Died: 2 July 1675 (aged 52–53)
- Spouse: Hon. Jane Ker (m. 1655)
- Children: 5
- Parent(s): John Drummond, 2nd Earl of Perth; Lady Jean Ker
- Relatives: Robert Ker, 1st Earl of Roxburghe (grandfather)

William Ker, 2nd Earl of Roxburghe PC (1622 – 2 July 1675) was a Scottish nobleman who inherited his title from his maternal grandfather, Robert Ker, 1st Earl of Roxburghe.

== Early life ==
He was born William Drummond in 1622. He was the fifth and youngest son born to John Drummond, 2nd Earl of Perth, and Lady Jean Ker. His eldest brother, James Drummond (1615–1675), inherited his father's titles and became the 3rd Earl of Perth.

His mother was the eldest daughter of Robert Ker, 1st Earl of Roxburghe and the former Margaret Maitland, the only daughter and eventual heiress of William Maitland of Lethington. His paternal grandparents were Patrick Drummond, 3rd Lord Drummond and Lady Elizabeth Lindsay (the daughter of David Lindsay, 9th Earl of Crawford). His brother's son, James Drummond, 4th Earl of Perth, was created the Duke of Perth in the Jacobite Peerage in 1701.

== Peerage and career ==
As both of his maternal uncles predeceased his grandfather, the 1st Earl of Roxburghe, without a male heir to inherit his titles and estates, nominated his grandson William for the honours in 1648. William changed his surname to Ker and, by special arrangement ratified by Parliament in 1661, inherited the titles and estates of his grandfather.

In 1660 and 1661, he served as Privy Councillor and in 1668, he served as Col. of Foot with the Roxburgh and Selkirk Militia.

== Personal life ==
On 17 May 1655, Roxburghe married his cousin, the Hon. Jane Ker, eldest daughter, and heir of line, of his late uncle, the Hon. Harry Ker (from his grandfather's second marriage to Jean Drummond, who was also his father's younger sister) and Lady Margaret Hay (the only daughter of William Hay, 10th Earl of Erroll and Lady Anne Lyon, daughter of Patrick Lyon, 1st Earl of Kinghorne). After his uncle died, Lady Margaret remarried to John Kennedy, 6th Earl of Cassilis. Together, they were the parents of:

- Hon. Robert Ker (c. 1658–1682), who married Lady Margaret Hay, eldest daughter of John Hay, 1st Marquess of Tweeddale.
- Hon. Harry Ker.
- Hon. William Ker, who served as Sheriff of Tweeddale.
- Hon. John Ker (d. 1707), who later took the surname Bellenden and became 2nd Lord Bellenden of Broughton (after inheriting from his first cousin twice removed, William Bellenden, 1st Lord Bellenden, the son of Sir James Bellenden of Broughton, and Margaret Ker).
- Lady Jean Ker, who married Colin Lindsay, 3rd Earl of Balcarres, a prominent supporter of James II of England.

Roxburghe died on 2 July 1675 and his titles were inherited by his eldest son, Robert.

=== Descendants ===
Through his son Robert, he was a grandfather of Robert Ker, 4th Earl of Roxburghe (c. 1677–1696), the eldest son of the 3rd Earl.

Through his youngest son John, who married Lady Mary Ramsay (widow of William Ramsay, 3rd Earl of Dalhousie) the second daughter of Henry Moore, 1st Earl of Drogheda, he was the grandfather of John Bellenden, 3rd Lord Bellenden and Lt. Col. William Bellenden (c. 1702–1759), himself the father of William Bellenden (1728–1805), later Bellenden-Ker, later 7th Lord Bellenden, later 4th Duke of Roxburghe.

Through his only daughter Lady Jean Ker, he was a grandfather of Colin Lindsay, Lord Cumberland, master of Balcarres, who died unmarried in 1708, and Margaret Lindsay, who married John Fleming, 6th Earl of Wigtown.

Peerage of Scotland
Preceded by Robert Ker	Earl of Roxburghe; 1650–1675	Succeeded by Robert Ker
