= Sheriff of Traquair =

Royal law enforcer in Traquair, Scotland

The Sheriff of Traquair was historically the royal official responsible for enforcing law and order in Traquair, Scotland. The office was merged in 1293 into the office of Sheriff of Peebles.

== Sheriffs of Traquair ==
- Gilbert Fraser (1241)
- Simon Fraser (1263–1265)
- William Perel (1288–1293)

In 1293 the sheriffdom was merged into the sheriffdom of Peebles.
