= William Bellenden, 1st Lord Bellenden =

The Right Honourable The Lord Bellenden PC

Treasurer-depute
- In office 1661–1671
- Succeeded by: The Earl of Lauderdale

Personal details
- Died: 1671
- Relations: Robert Ker, 1st Earl of Roxburghe (uncle)
- Parent(s): Sir James Bellenden; Margaret Ker

William Bellenden, Lord Bellenden PC (died 1671), was Treasurer-depute of Scotland.

== Early life ==
Bellenden was born before 1606. He was the only son and heir of Sir James Bellenden of Broughton, and Margaret Ker. His mother was the sister of Robert Ker, 1st Earl of Roxburghe, and the second daughter of Sir William Ker of Cessford.

== Career ==
A staunch adherent of the Royal Family during the Civil Wars, on 10 June 1661 he was created Lord Bellenden, was made Treasurer-depute, and was placed on the privy council of Scotland. He was made heretable Usher of the Exchequer on 13 December 1663 and one of the Treasury Commissioners of Scotland in 1668.

In 1662, John Maitland, 1st Duke of Lauderdale, on the advice of his brother, managed to secure Bellenden's interest in his struggle with John Middleton, 1st Earl of Middleton and faction over religious policy; and he is from that time one of his most frequent correspondents. He kept Lauderdale informed on the plans of James Sharp, to whom he was hostile.

When the treasurership was taken from John Leslie, 7th Earl of Rothes in 1668 and was put into commission, Bellenden was one of the commissioners. He was then in failing health, and was noted for his overbearing manners at the treasury board meetings, especially when, as was the case, his own accounts as treasurer-depute were called in question, or when any matter of precedence was in dispute.

== Personal life ==
As Bellenden was unmarried and childless, on 14 April 1671, he resigned his peerage in favour of his first cousin twice times removed, Hon. John Ker (later John Bellenden, 2nd Lord Bellenden), the youngest son of William Ker, 2nd Earl of Roxburghe, and his heirs of entail, which was confirmed by Royal charter on 12 December 1673. He was buried on 6 September 1671 at St Martin-in-the-Fields.

Peerage of Scotland
New creation	Lord Bellenden; 1661–1671	Succeeded by John Bellenden
