= John Drummond, 2nd Earl of Perth =

Scottish nobleman

John Drummond, 2nd Earl of Perth (1588–1662) was a Scottish nobleman.

== Career ==
Drummond was the son of Patrick Drummond, 3rd Lord Drummond and Lady Elizabeth Lindsay. He succeeded to his father's title of 4th Lord Drummond in 1602

Drummond wrote a memoir of his education, formative years, and marriages. He was educated in Dunblane, then schooled in Edinburgh according to the direction of his sister Lilias, Lady Fyvie until the Union of the Crowns in 1603. He was then sent to France and went to study with Robert Balfour, Principal of the College of Guienne, and a Catholic. Drummond next went to Toulouse and attended lectures in Law. After this he stayed in Paris for a while in 1610 and saw the coronation of Marie de' Medici as Regent on 13 May.

In August 1610 he went to London and visited his sister Jean Drummond who was an influential courtier serving Anne of Denmark. His brother James Drummond (1586–1611), who had been created Earl of Perth died of a "hectic sickness" at Seton Palace, and John Drummond was made (by special remainder) Earl of Perth on 8 December 1611.

He was involved in conflict with the Clan MacGregor at Duncrub in 1611. James VI and I was pleased with the outcome, and Drummond went to court again for several months, where (he says) his sister, now Lady Roxburghe was able to ensure that his living expenses were light.

Drummond also wrote a eulogy of Anna Gordon, the wife of his son James Drummond, later 3rd Earl of Perth, who died in January 1656 following the birth of a daughter and was buried at the family chapel of Innerpeffray.

He died on 11 June 1662.

== Marriage and children ==
He married Jean Ker (died 1622), daughter of Robert Ker, 1st Earl of Roxburghe and Mary Maitland, on 28 August 1613. Their children included:

- Henry Drummond, born 1 August 1614, died September 1622. Anne of Denmark chose his name, and the Countess of Montrose was her depute as godmother at the baptism at Dunblane.
- James Drummond, 3rd Earl of Perth, born 1615, died 2 June 1675. He married Anna Gordon (died 1656), daughter of George Gordon, 2nd Marquess of Huntly.
- Robert Drummond
- John Drummond of Logiealmond (1620–1678), who married Grissell Stewart, a daughter of Thomas Stewart of Grandtully
- Lady Lilias Drummond, born circa 1621, died before 12 January 1663/1664, who married James Murray, Earl of Tullibardine, son of Elizabeth Dent, Countess of Tullibardine in May 1643.
- Sir William Drummond, later Sir William Ker, 2nd Earl of Roxburghe, born 1623, died 2 July 1675
- Lady Jean Drummond, born 1623/24, died 12 January 1663

John Drummond mentions that his daughters were brought up in Scotland and at court with Jean Drummond, Lady Roxburghe.

Peerage of Scotland
Preceded by James Drummond	Earl of Perth; 1611–1662	Succeeded by James Drummond
