= John Hay, 1st Marquess of Tweeddale =

Scottish peer and politician (1625–1697)

The Most Honourable The Marquess of Tweeddale
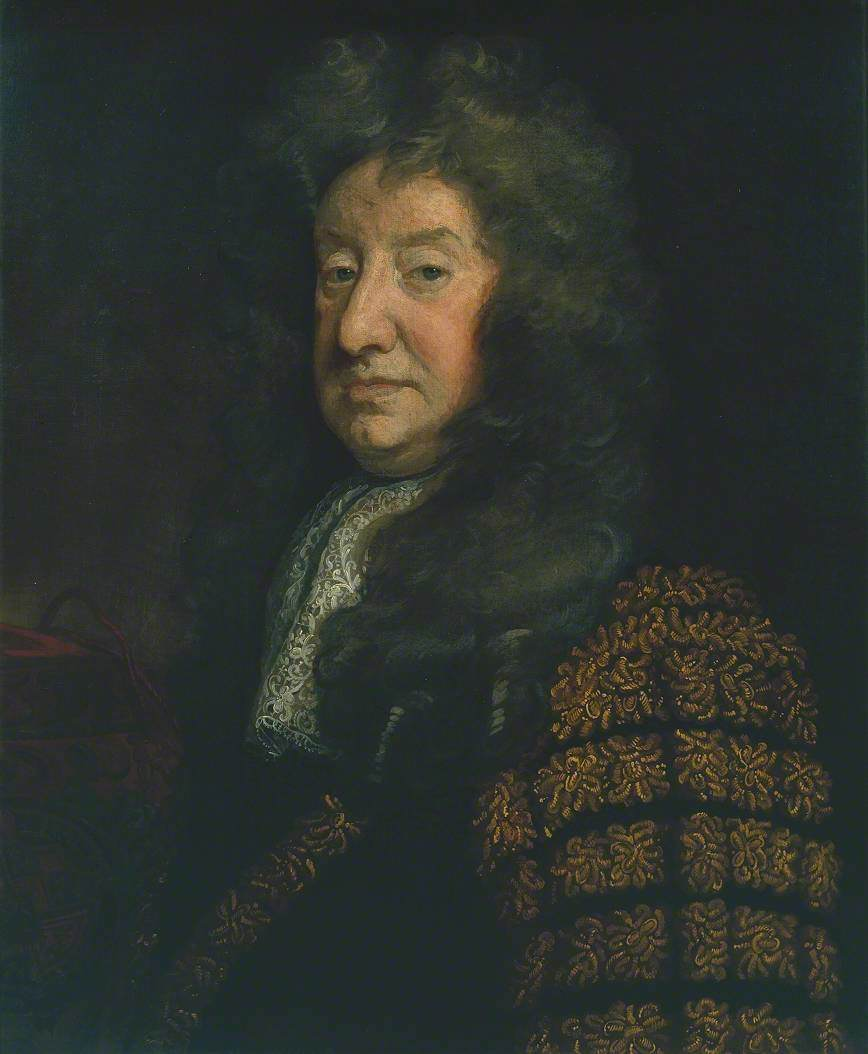
- Portrait by Godfrey Kneller.

Lord High Commissioner to the Parliament of Scotland
- In office 1694–1696
- Monarch: William II
- Preceded by: The Duke of Hamilton
- Succeeded by: The Earl of Tullibardine

Lord Chancellor of Scotland
- In office 1692–1696
- Monarch: William II
- Preceded by: The Earl of Perth
- Succeeded by: The Earl of Marchmont

Personal details
- Born: 13 August 1625 Yester, East Lothian, Scotland
- Died: 11 August 1697 (aged 71) Edinburgh, Scotland
- Spouse: Jean Scott (m. 1644)
- Children: 5, including John
- Parent(s): John Hay, 1st Earl of Tweeddale; Lady Jean Seton

Military service
- Battles/wars: English Civil War: Battle of Marston Moor; Battle of Preston

John Hay, 1st Marquess of Tweeddale (13 August 1625 – 11 August 1697) was a Scottish peer and politician who served as Lord Chancellor of Scotland.

== Early life ==
Hay was born in 1626. He was the eldest son of John Hay, 1st Earl of Tweeddale (created 1 December 1646) and Lady Jean Seton. After his mother's death a few days after his birth in 1625, his father remarried to Lady Margaret Montgomerie, the eldest daughter of Alexander Montgomerie, 6th Earl of Eglinton and Lady Anne Livingston (eldest daughter of Alexander Livingston, 1st Earl of Linlithgow). After his father's death in 1653, his stepmother remarried to William Cunningham, 9th Earl of Glencairn. From his father's second marriage, he had a younger half-brother, the Hon. William Hay of Drummelzier (1649–1726), who married the Hon. Elizabeth Seton, only surviving daughter of Alexander Seton, 1st Viscount of Kingston.

His father was the eldest son and heir of James Hay, 7th Lord Hay of Yester and Lady Margaret Kerr (third daughter of Mark Kerr, 1st Earl of Lothian). His mother was the only daughter of Alexander Seton, 1st Earl of Dunfermline by his second wife, Lady Grizel Leslie (the half-sister of John Leslie, 6th Earl of Rothes).

== Career ==
During the English Civil War he repeatedly switched allegiance between the Royalist cause and the Parliamentarians. He fought for Charles I and joined him at Nottingham in 1642, then for Parliament at the Battle of Marston Moor in 1644, on account of his attitude towards Covenanters, and four years later was again on the side of the Royalists at the Battle of Preston.

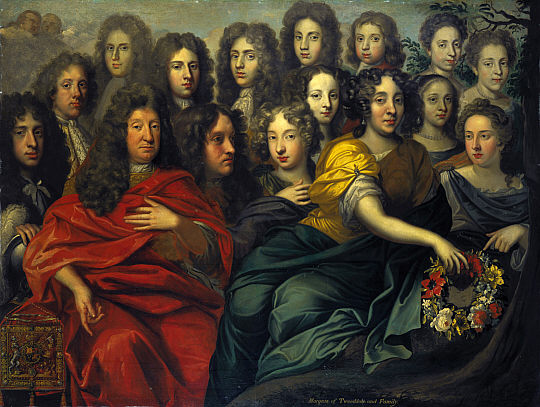
The 1st Marquess of Tweeddale, posing with his wife Jane, and their children and their children's spouses.

He succeeded as Earl of Tweeddale in 1654, and was imprisoned for support of James Guthrie in 1660. He was a member of the Commonwealth Parliaments of 1656 and 1659.

When Charles II was restored to the throne, he was appointed Lord President of the Scottish Council in 1663 and an Extraordinary Lord of Session in 1664. He was elected in the latter year a Fellow of the Royal Society.

He used his influence to moderate proceedings against the Covenanters, but with the hardening of the official attitude in 1674 he was dismissed from office and from the Privy Council on the advice of Lauderdale.

He returned to the Treasury in 1680. Tweeddale supported William III and became a privy councillor in 1689. He was Lord Chancellor of Scotland from 1692 to 1696.

He supported the Glorious Revolution in Scotland, and was created Marquess of Tweeddale in 1694. As Lord High Commissioner to the Parliament of Scotland from 1694 to 1696 he ordered the inquiry into the Glencoe massacre in 1695. He was dismissed from the Chancellorship in 1696 for supporting the Darien scheme.

== Personal life ==
On 4 September 1644, Tweeddale was married to Lady Jean Scott, the second daughter of Walter Scott, 1st Earl of Buccleuch and Lady Mary Hay, third daughter of Francis Hay, 9th Earl of Erroll). Together, they were the parents of:

- John Hay, 2nd Marquess of Tweeddale (1645–1713), who married Lady Mary Maitland, only daughter and heiress of John Maitland, 1st Duke of Lauderdale.
- David Hay (1656–1737), who married Rachel Hayes, daughter of Sir James Hayes, of Great Bedgbury.
- Alexander Hay (1663–1737), who married Catherine Charters, daughter of Laurence Charters.
- Margaret Hay (d. 1753), who married Robert Ker, 3rd Earl of Roxburghe.
- Jean Hay (d. 1729), who married William Douglas, 1st Earl of March.

Tweeddale died on 11 Aug 1697.

=== Legacy ===
His portrait by Sir Peter Lely is held by the Scottish National Portrait Gallery.

Political offices
Preceded by The Earl of Perth	Lord Chancellor of Scotland; 1692 – 1696	Succeeded by The Earl of Marchmont
Parliament of Scotland
Preceded by The Duke of Hamilton	Lord High Commissioner; 1694–1696	Succeeded by The Earl of Tullibardine
Peerage of Scotland
New creation	Marquess of Tweeddale; 1694–1697	Succeeded by John Hay
Preceded by John Hay	Earl of Tweeddale; 1653–1697	Succeeded by John Hay
