= Sir Harry Innes, 4th Baronet =

Scottish politician and baronet

Sir Harry Innes, 4th Baronet (c. 1670–1721) was a Scottish politician and baronet. Son of Sir James Innes, 3rd Baronet, and Margaret Ker, daughter of Henry Ker, Lord Ker, he represented the Parliament of Scotland constituency of Elginshire 1704–1707. He was a member of the Innes baronets.

Baronetage of Nova Scotia
Preceded by James Innes	Baronet (of Innes) c.1700–1721	Succeeded by Harry Innes
