= Robert Ker, 1st Earl of Roxburghe =

Scottish nobleman (c. 1570 – 1650)

The Right Honourable The Earl of Roxburghe

Keeper of the Privy Seal of Scotland
- In office 1641–1649
- Preceded by: Earl of Melrose
- Succeeded by: Earl of Sutherland

Personal details
- Born: c. 1570
- Died: 1650
- Spouses: Margaret Maitland (m. 1587; died 1613) Jean Drummond (m. 1613; died 1643) Lady Isobel Douglas (after 1643)
- Children: 5
- Relatives: Walter Ker of Cessford (grandfather); Sir James Douglas (grandfather); William Ker, 2nd Earl of Roxburghe (grandson)

Robert Ker, 1st Earl of Roxburghe (c. 1570 – 1650) was a Scottish nobleman.

== Early life ==
He was the eldest son of William Ker of Cessford (died 1605), and Janet Douglas. His mother was the widow of James Tweedie of Drumelzier, and the third daughter of Sir James Douglas of Drumlanrig.

His paternal grandfather was Sir Walter Ker of Cessford (died c. 1584), who fought against Mary, Queen of Scots, both at Carberry Hill and at Langside.

The family homes were Cessford Castle and Halliden in East Teviotdale.

== Career ==
He was knighted on 17 May 1590 at the coronation of Anne of Denmark. In December 1590 he was involved in the assassination of William Kerr of Ancram who was ambushed on the stairs at the entry to his lodging by two of Robert's followers who shot him with a pistol called a "dag".

Ker had married Margaret Maitland, a niece of the Chancellor, John Maitland of Thirlestane. In 1592 Ker was able to help Maitland into the favour of Anne of Denmark.

Ker was Deputy Keeper of Liddesdale and Warden of the Middle March in 1593. In August 1594 he performed in the tournament at the baptism of Prince Henry at Stirling Castle dressed as a Turkish knight.

He helped James VI against Bothwell. In 1598 he was sent to England and kept by Matthew Hutton, Archbishop of York, at Bishopsthorpe. Ker was returned to Berwick and sent his thanks to Archbishop Hutton from his house near Kelso, Friers, on 14 June 1598.

He was a member of the Privy Council of Scotland from 1599, and was created Lord Roxburghe in 1600. In April 1601 Roxburghe invited James VI and his consort Anne of Denmark to the celebration of the marriage of his sister Elizabeth to Sir John Bellenden of Broughton at Floors Castle, but the king refused, suspecting a plot involving the Master of Gray.

In September 1602, he visited Elizabeth I of England. Sir Robert Cecil wrote that he was "of as wise and gallant fashion as I have seen out of Scotland a great while." He accompanied King James to London in 1603. Ker succeeded to his father's estates in 1606 and in 1607, he was a Gentleman of the Bedchamber.

On 18 September 1616, he was created Lord Ker of Cessford and Caverton, and Earl of Roxburghe with remainder to his heirs male.

He offended decorum at court in April 1625, when the body of King James was brought from Theobalds it was noticed that the Earls of Morton and Roxburghe were not in attendance, but went to be "merry" at More Park with Lucy Russell, Countess of Bedford.

He was appointed Keeper of the Privy Seal of Scotland in 1637.

He subscribed to the King's Covenant at Holyrood in 1638, and joined the King's party in the civil war. When the King attempted to arrest five members of the House of Commons in 1642, Ker kept the door of the chamber open (see article on William Lenthall). He supported the "Engagement" for the King's rescue in 1648, and was consequently deprived of his office as Keeper of the Privy Seal in 1649.

== Personal life ==
The Earl of Roxburghe married three times. His first marriage was on 27 October 1587 to Margaret Maitland (died by 1613), the only daughter of William Maitland of Lethington and Mary Fleming (a granddaughter of King James IV ) who was one of the "Four Maries", the devoted companions of the Queen of the Scots. They were the parents of:

- William Ker, styled Lord Ker, Commendator of Kelso Abbey (d. 1643), who died before Lord Ker.
- Jean Ker (d. 1622), who married John Drummond, 2nd Earl of Perth.
- Isabel Ker, who married James Scrymgeour, 2nd Viscount of Dudhope.
- Mary Ker, who married Sir James Haliburton of Pitcur (son of Sir James Halyburton). After his death, she married James Carnegie, 2nd Earl of Southesk (parents of Robert Carnegie, 3rd Earl of Southesk).

On 3 February 1613/14, he married Jean or Jane Drummond (c. 1585–1643), the sister of his son-in-law and the third daughter of Patrick Drummond, 3rd Lord Drummond and Lady Elizabeth Lindsay (daughter of David Lindsay, 9th Earl of Crawford). They had one son:

- Henry Ker, styled Lord Ker (d. 1643), who married, in 1638, Lady Margaret Hay, daughter of William Hay, 10th Earl of Erroll. They had three daughters: Jean, Mary, and Margaret. After his death, his widow married John Kennedy, 6th Earl of Cassilis.

After his second wife's death in 1643, he married Lady Isobel Douglas, fifth daughter of William Douglas, 7th Earl of Morton, by his wife Lady Anne Keith (eldest daughter of George Keith, 5th Earl Marischal).

He died at Floors, his residence near Kelso, on 18 January 1650. After his death, his widow married James Graham, 2nd Marquess of Montrose and became the mother of James Graham, 3rd Marquess of Montrose.

His will mentions a chain of diamonds and rubies, with a "picture case" or locket containing the miniature portrait of Anne of Denmark, set with diamonds, the central larger stone was heart shaped. He owned a "valentine set with diamonds" with a crown and the picture of Charles I of England as Duke of York. These jewels had probably been gifts to his wife from the queen.

=== Title and estate ===
As both of his sons predeceased him without male issue of their own, his titles and estates passed by special arrangement to his grandson, William Drummond (1622–1675), the youngest son of his eldest daughter Jean and her husband John Drummond, 2nd Earl of Perth. William took the name of Ker, became 2nd Earl of Roxburghe, and married his cousin, Lord Ker's daughter Jean.

Political offices
Preceded by Thomas Hamilton	Keeper of the Privy Seal of Scotland; 1641–1649	Succeeded by John Gordon
Peerage of Scotland
New creation	Earl of Roxburghe; 1616–1650	Succeeded by William Drummond
New creation	Lord Roxburghe; 1600–1650	Succeeded by William Drummond
