= North Stainley Hall =

Building in North Stainley, North Yorkshire, England

Coordinates: 54°11′01″N 1°33′42″W

North Stainley Hall is a historic building in North Stainley, a village in North Yorkshire, in England.

The Staveley family were appointed as keepers of Ripon Park in 1516, and it appears that they built North Stainley Hall around this date, as a secondary house. The current country house was built in 1715 for Miles Staveley. It was extended in the 19th century. In 1985, it was restored by Robert Staveley, using funds from Lightwater Valley, the work including the reconstruction of the service wing and courtyard. The building has been grade II* listed since 1952.

The house is built of brick on a stone plinth, rendered at the rear, with stone dressings, quoins, an eaves cornice, and a hipped stone slate roof. It has three storeys and five bays. The central doorway has rusticated columns, and an initialled and dated pediment. The windows are sashes with eared architraves, those on the lower two floors also with keystones. At the rear is a re-set doorway with an alternate quoined surround and a five-part lintel, and a bay window to the right.

The former stables are built of cobble, with gritstone dressings, quoins, and a purple slate roof. There are two storeys and three bays, the middle bay projecting slightly under a gable. This contains a carriage arch with a quoined surround, above which is a sash window and three tiers of pigeon holes in a triangular pattern. The outer bays contain doorways and sash windows, in the left return is a circular window, and on the right return are external steps and a circular window above. They were built in the mid-18th century, and are grade II listed.

== See also ==
- Grade II* listed buildings in North Yorkshire (district)
- Listed buildings in North Stainley with Sleningford
