= Joshua Crompton =

British politician

Joshua Samuel Crompton (17 September 1799 – 17 June 1881) was a British politician.

Crompton studied at Jesus College, Cambridge. He then lived at Sion Hill in Yorkshire. At the 1832 UK general election, he stood in Ripon, winning the seat as a Whig. He stood down at the 1835 UK general election. He later served as a magistrate in both the North and West Riding of Yorkshire.

Parliament of the United Kingdom
Preceded by Louis Hayes Petit; George Spence	Member of Parliament for Ripon; 1832–1835; With: Thomas Staveley	Succeeded by James Charles Dalbiac; Thomas Pemberton Leigh
