= Lancelot Shadwell =

British lawyer and politician (1779–1850)

Sir Lancelot Shadwell (3 May 1779 – 10 August 1850) was a barrister at Lincoln's Inn and was Member of Parliament (MP) for Ripon from 1826 to 1827 before becoming Vice-Chancellor of England in 1827. He supported Jewish emancipation.

== Life ==
He was the eldest son of Lancelot Shadwell of Lincoln's Inn, barrister-at-law, an eminent conveyancer, by his wife Elizabeth, third daughter of Charles Whitmore of Southampton, and was born on 3 May 1779.

He was educated at Eton, and subsequently went to St. John's College, Cambridge, where, in 1800, he became seventh wrangler, obtained the second chancellor's medal, and graduated B.A. He was elected a fellow of his college on 23 March 1801, graduated M.A. in 1803, and received the honorary degree of LL.D. in 1842.

Shadwell was admitted a member of Lincoln's Inn on 30 June 1797, and was called to the bar on 10 February 1803. After practising eighteen years with much success as a junior in the court of chancery, he was appointed a king's counsel on 8 December 1821, and took his seat within the bar on the first day of Hilary term 1822. He did not follow the practice then prevalent of taking briefs in more than one equity court, and confined himself to practising before the lord chancellor.

At the general election in June 1826, Shadwell obtained a seat in the House of Commons for the borough of Ripon through the influence of Miss Elizabeth Sophia Lawrence, under whose will he subsequently received a bequest. On 14 February 1827, he introduced a bill for the limitation of a writ of right and for the amendment of the law of dower, but it did not get beyond the committee stage. His parliamentary career was short, for on 31 October 1827 he was appointed vice-chancellor of England in the place of Sir Anthony Hart. On 16 November 1827, he was sworn a member of the privy council and knighted.

Shadwell presided in the vice-chancellor's court for nearly twenty-three years. During this period he twice filled the office of a commissioner of the great seal: from 23 April 1835 to 16 January 1836 with Charles Pepys, 1st Earl of Cottenham, and Sir John Bosanquet, and again from 19 June to 15 July 1850, in conjunction with Henry Bickersteth, 1st Baron Langdale and Sir R. M. Rolfe.

On 24 June, Shadwell was seized with a sudden illness, which prevented him from sitting again during the continuance of the second commission. He died at his residence, Barn Elms, Surrey, on 10 August 1850, aged 71, and was buried in Barnes churchyard.

== Family ==
Shadwell married, first, on 8 January 1805, Harriet, daughter of Anthony Richardson of Powis Place, Great Ormond Street, a London merchant, and sister of Sir John Richardson, by whom he had Sir Charles Frederick Alexander Shadwell, and five other sons. His first wife died on 25 May 1814, and on 4 January 1816 he married, secondly, Frances, third and youngest daughter of Captain Locke, by whom he had six sons and five daughters. Shadwell's second wife died on 27 October 1854, aged 66.

== Legacy ==
A plaque is displayed outside the Baptist Church in Rushmere St. Andrew displaying a ruling he made regarding Rushmere Common.

His son, also called Lancelot Shadwell (1808–1861), translated part of the New Testament to include the name "Jehovah". In his The Gospels of Matthew, and of Mark, he included God's name 28 times. His work can be found in the Bodleian Libraries.

== Arms ==
Coat of arms of Lancelot Shadwell
Crest An escallop Or. Escutcheon Per pale Or and Azure on a chevron between three annulets four escallops all counterchanged. Motto Loyal Au Mort (Loyal Unto Death)

Parliament of the United Kingdom
Preceded by George Gipps; Frederick John Robinson	Member of Parliament for Ripon; 1826–1827; With: Frederick John Robinson to 1827; Louis Hayes Petit from 1827	Succeeded by Louis Hayes Petit; George Spence
