= Thomas Staveley (MP) =

Thomas Kitchenham Staveley (1790 – 20 February 1860) was a British politician.

Born Thomas Hutchinson, he served with the Royal Engineers from 1808 to 1815, rising to the rank of captain. In 1814, he inherited the property of General Miles Staveley, and later changed adopted Staveley as his own surname. He then lived at Old Sleningford Hall in Yorkshire.

Staveley stood for the Whigs in Ripon at the 1832 UK general election, winning the seat. In Parliament, he called for the immediate abolition of slavery. He stood down at the 1835 UK general election. He later served as a deputy lieutenant of the North Riding of Yorkshire, and as a magistrate in both the North Riding and the liberty of Ripon.

Parliament of the United Kingdom
Preceded by Louis Hayes Petit; George Spence	Member of Parliament for Ripon; 1832–1835; With: Joshua Crompton	Succeeded by James Charles Dalbiac; Thomas Pemberton Leigh
