= Middle Parks Farm =

Farmhouse in North Stainley with Sleningford, Harrogate, England

Coordinates: 54.1707°N 1.5390°W

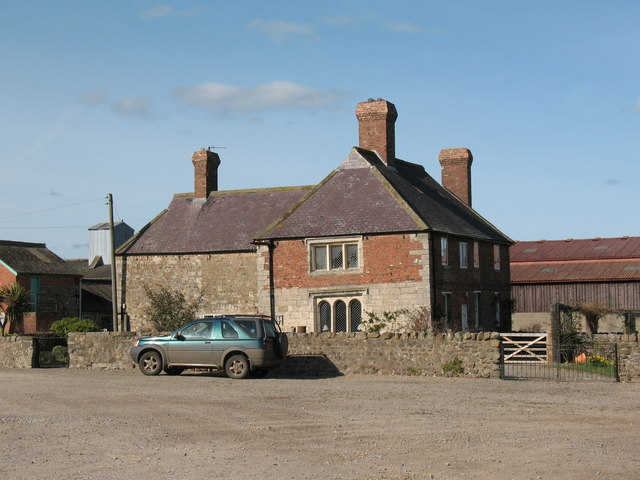
The farmhouse, in 2007

Middle Parks Farm is a farm near North Stainley, a village in North Yorkshire, in England.

The farm lies on land which formed part of Ripon Park. The deer park had three hunting lodges, with Horseman's Lodge being the most important. It was built in about 1400, and extended in the 16th century, but was in ruins by 1649. That year, the park was enclosed to produce three farms, and Horseman's Lodge was converted into Middle Parks Farmhouse. The building was encased in brick in two stages, in the early 18th century and mid 19th century, and it was extended and altered in the 20th century. The farmhouse was grade II* listed in 1982.

The farmhouse has a timber framed core, which has been encased in limestone and red brick, and has hipped Westmorland slate roofs. It has two storeys and an L-shaped plan, each range with three bays. The right end bay of the south front has quoins, the lower floor is in limestone and the upper floor in red brick. The lower floor contains a three-light mullioned window with round-headed lights, and on the upper floor is a three-light mullioned window, the lights with flat heads, and both with hood moulds. Elsewhere, the windows are sashes, and inside there is substantial remaining timber framing. One ground floor room has 17th-century plasterwork and a fireplace of similar date, and there is another 17th-century fireplace in the room above.

== See also ==
- Grade II* listed buildings in North Yorkshire (district)
- Listed buildings in North Stainley with Sleningford
