= Sutton Grange =

Sutton Grange may refer to:

- Sutton Grange, North Yorkshire, a small settlement in North Yorkshire, England
- Sutton Grange, Victoria, a small country town in Victoria, Australia
- Sutton Grange, a settlement in Ellington High and Low
