= Sleningford Watermill =

Mill in North Yorkshire, England

Coordinates: 54°12′00″N 1°34′18″W

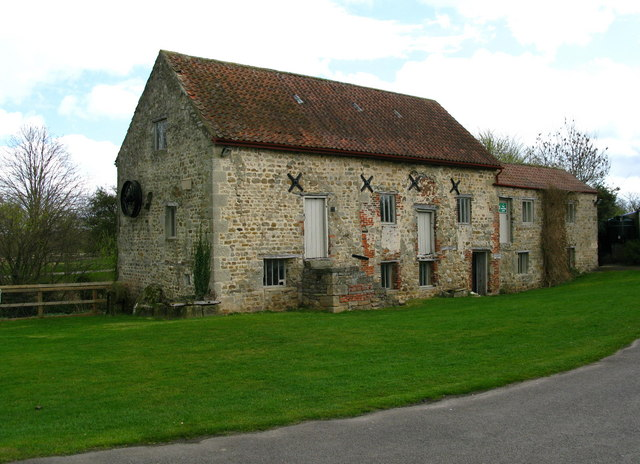
The mill, in 2009

Sleningford Watermill is a historic corn mill near North Stainley, a village in North Yorkshire in England.

A watermill at this site on the River Ure was first recorded in the 14th century. The current mill was probably built in 1773, when it was known as Walk Mill. The wooden waterwheel was replaced with an iron wheel in the early 19th century, while the roof was replaced in the 20th century. The mill ceased to operate in the 1950s, and in 1973 was restored to form the centre of a campsite, being extended by two bays to accommodate an information centre, shop and house. The building was grade II listed in 1986.

The mill is built of stone, cobbles and brick, with quoins and a pantile roof. There are two storeys and three bays, a two-storey two-bay addition to the right, and a single-story wheelhouse at the rear. On the front are two doorways, the left approached by steps, windows, and a loading door. The waterwheel survives, as does much of the machinery.

== See also ==
- Listed buildings in North Stainley with Sleningford
