= Old Sleningford Hall =

Building in North Yorkshire, England

Coordinates: 54.1861°N 1.5956°W

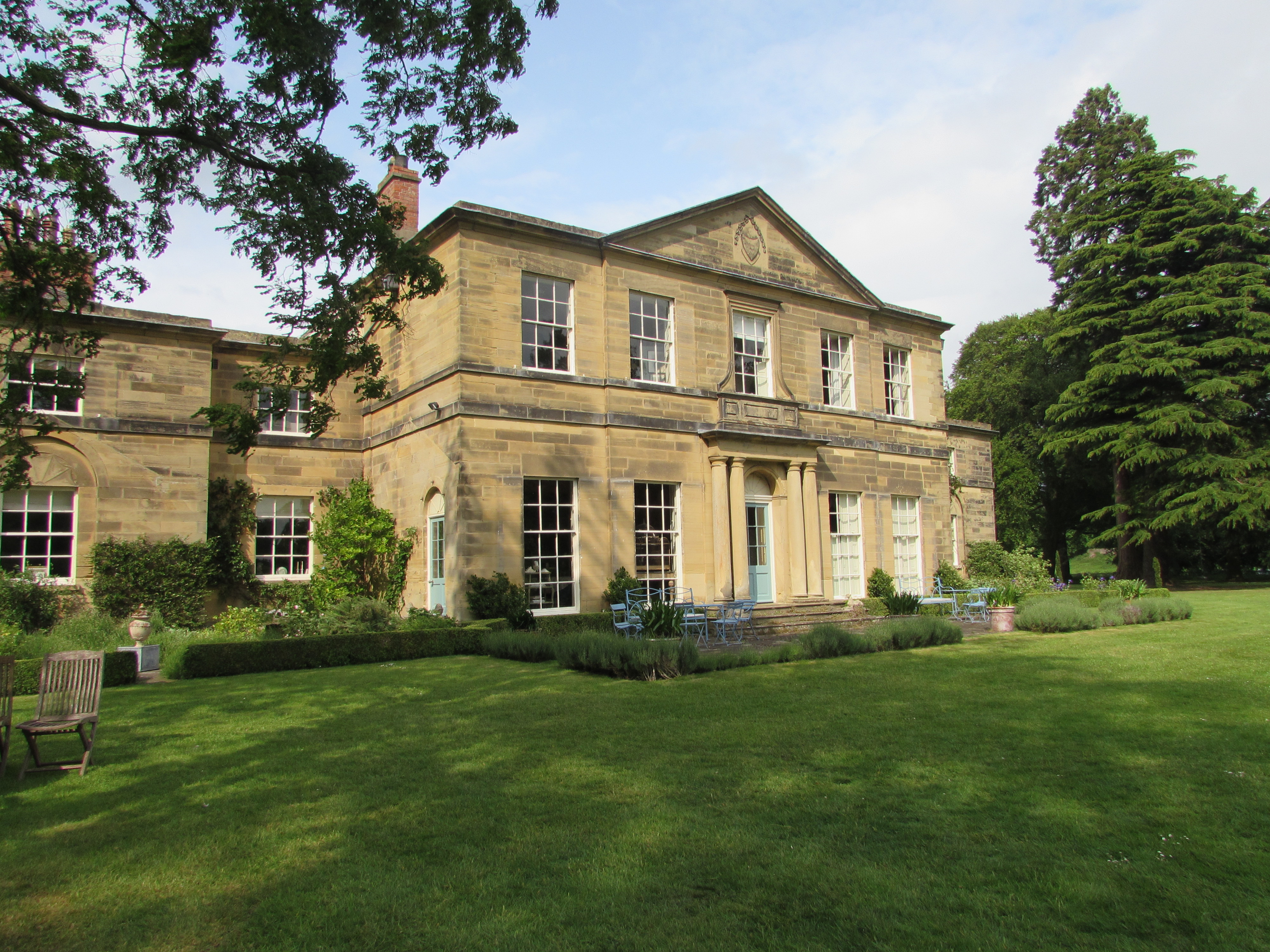
The building, in 2019

Old Sleningford Hall is a historic building near North Stainley, a village in North Yorkshire in England.

The country house was built in the early 19th century for Thomas Staveley, replacing an earlier building. The gardens were laid out at the same time, and altered in the late 20th century with guidance from Brenda Colvin. The main door of the house was replaced in the 20th century. It was grade II listed, along with the attached garden wall, in 1952. The stables have been converted into an art gallery and studio.

The house is built of stone, with a floor band, a sill band, and hipped Westmorland slate roofs. There are two storeys, a central block of five bays, the middle three bays projecting under a triangular pediment with decoration in the tympanum, and flanking lower two-bay wings, the outer bays projecting slightly. The central doorway is flanked by paired Tuscan columns with an entablature and a cornice, above which is a projecting tripartite panel. The windows are sashes, the window above the doorway with an eared architrave. To the left is a garden wall in red brick with stone coping and ball finials.

The former stables were also built in the early 19th century and are grade II listed. They are built of stone and brick with stone slate roofs. They consist of two parallel ranges on two sides of a courtyard, the east and west sides enclosed by walls. Each range has two storeys and a taller single-bay tower at the east end. The towers are square, with a circular window in each floor, floor bands, and a pyramidal roof with a lantern and weathervane. The left tower has a dated clock in a former pigeon loft. The west wall contains a doorway, and the east wall, forming the entrance, has a central gateway flanked by square piers with pyramidal caps. Inside the courtyard are stable doors, sash windows and carriage doors.

== See also ==
- Listed buildings in North Stainley with Sleningford
