= Ripon Parks =

Site of Special Scientific Interest in North Yorkshire, England

- Site of Special Scientific Interest
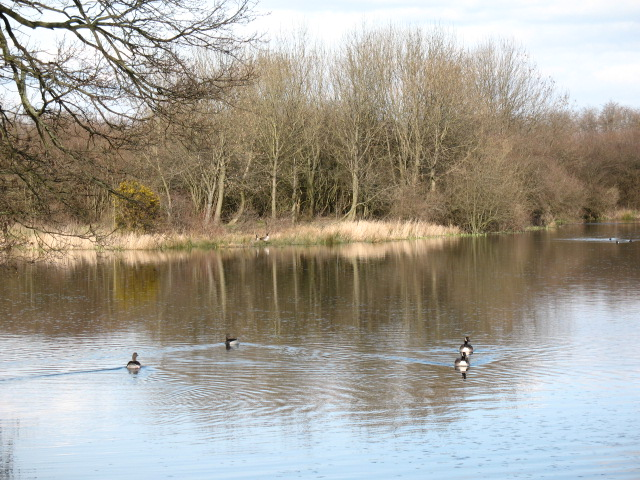
- Black Heath Pond, Ripon Parks

- Location within North Yorkshire
- Location of Ripon Parks.
- Area of search: North Yorkshire
- Grid reference: SE310747
- Coordinates: 54.1671°N 1.5266°W
- Interest: Biological
- Area: 137.0113 hectares (1.370 km^{2}; 0.5290 sq mi)
- Notification date: 1 February 1983
- Location map: Magic Map (Defra)

Ripon Parks is a Site of Special Scientific Interest, or SSSI, situated north of Ripon, to the west of the River Ure and to the east of the village of North Stainley, in North Yorkshire, England. It was once part of the land held since the Middle Ages as a deer park by the archbishops of York (including Cardinal Wolsey) and the canons of Ripon. The site was designated as an SSSI in 1983, because its varied habitats are valued for their breeding birds, amphibians and varied flora. The woods here are "of note" for the parasitic flowers of common toothwort and yellow star-of-Bethlehem. A small part of the site is accessible via public footpaths; there are no public facilities or dedicated car parks. The site incorporates the High Batts Nature Reserve, which is privately run for training, recording and educational purposes, and accessible to members only, except for its annual open day. Ripon Parks is now owned by the Ministry of Defence, and parts of the site are used as military training areas.

== Site history ==
Ripon Parks forms part of a tranche of land owned by the Church since the 7th century, when the King of Northumbria – possibly Aldfrith – gave it the Liberty of St Wilfred. Archbishop John Kemp of York claimed the fishing rights and the warren on this land in 1439; there had already been complaints of poaching there. From 1320 the park was managed by wakemen of Ripon. Mary, Queen of Scots travelled from Bolton Castle to Sheffield Castle via this park in 1569.

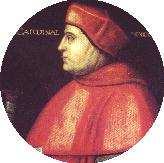
Cardinal Wolsey

From the Reformation, the Church maintained its hold on the land via the archbishop of York, and subsequently the canons of Ripon. In 1516 Miles Staveley and his son John became keepers of the park, which was at that time a "reserved hunting park" for Cardinal Wolsey, who had by then acquired the archbishopric of York, and the bishoprics of Winchester and Durham. When hunting, the archbishops originally used Horseman's Lodge, and later a summer palace, which still exists as a school at Ripon, in a deer park called New Park. The Staveley family remained keepers of the Park until 1647, when it was enclosed and had previously ceased to be a hunting park. Much of the land is still in the possession of the Church Commissioners, who inherited it from the Canons of Ripon.

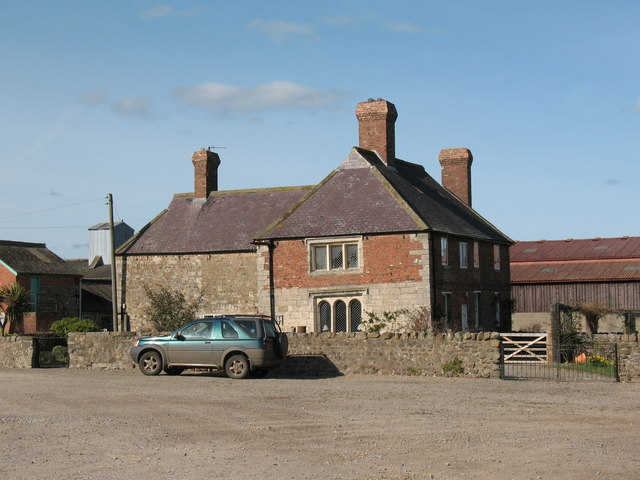
Middle Parks Farmhouse

Before enclosure, there were three hunting lodges: Chief Lodge in the south, Horseman's Lodge in the middle, and North Lodge. Enclosure divided the park into three farms, and the lodges became farmhouses. The Horseman's Lodge, next to the old fish ponds, (Note: The original bishop's fish ponds called The Dubbs are the Figure of Eight Pond, Black Heath Pond and Maple Pond. There is also a dried pond called The Dub, at the only public eastern entrance to the park. The Dubbs are still owned by the Church of England, and leased out for angling.) was renamed Middle Parks Farmhouse, and it retains a Tudor wing. North Parks farmhouse has been cement rendered, and South Parks Farmhouse was demolished in the 1970s. In 1647 a survey recorded nearly a thousand "decayed oak trees," plus maple, hazel, hawthorn and ash, although by then the deer were all gone. Ripon Park was possibly once fenced in with a palisade or perhaps a hedge on an earthen bank. The Lord Mayor of London owned Ripon Parks between 1649 and 1660, then it reverted to the Church, which retained it until 1926. The southern section of Ripon Parks passed through several ownerships, and part of South Parks still belongs to Ripon City Golf Club.

Along with Laver Banks and Ellington Banks, Ripon Parks is owned by the Ministry of Defence, and these sites are known as HG Ripon Training area, commanded from Deverell Barracks. It is used for "low level infantry dry training," plus training in use of earth-moving equipment and cross-country vehicles, and in building bridges. "The habitat in all DTE North (East) training areas is carefully managed with the best interests of the flora and fauna given full consideration."

== Site location and designation ==
Ripon Parks is a 137.0013 hectares (1.370 km^{2}; 0.5290 sq mi) biological Site of Special Scientific Interest (SSSI). It follows a line along the River Ure, from just north of Ripon, North Yorkshire, to a point just east of North Stainley. Its habitats are all river-related, and include calcareous grassland, pasture, ponds, marsh, scrub woodland, riverbanks and streams, besides the river itself.

The site was notified on 1 February 1983. All the habitats are noted for their varied flora, but all have their specialities. The "relatively undisturbed reach of river ... is important for breeding birds." The wetlands are "important for amphibians." This is a Magnesian Limestone area, with overlying calcareous grassland and its typical species. The woodlands are "of note" for toothwort and yellow star-of-Bethlehem. A small part of the site is accessible via public footpaths, but there are no public facilities.

=== High Batts Nature Reserve ===
High Batts Nature Reserve is a privately run study resource, and part of Ripon Parks SSSI. It is sited at the north end of Ripon Parks, between the River Ure on the east side, and Hanson's sand and gravel quarry on the west side. It has an annual Open Day, and is accessible to subscribing members, and to visitors by appointment. It includes various habitats, including meadow, coppice, bracken, clearings and an orchid area, plus a stream, pond and bird hides. Training of members in bird ringing, moth trapping and other wildlife recording is carried out.

Birds recorded at High Batts include: marsh tit, redpoll, siskin, great spotted woodpecker, redwing, goldcrest and kingfisher. Fungi include: birch polypore, candlesnuff, dead man's fingers, jelly ear and stump puffball. There are many bryophytes, including three which require a calcareous soil: Entodon concinnus, Thuidium assimile and Ditrichum gracile.

== Significant site content ==
Note: Unless otherwise stated, images of flora and fauna in this article are for identification only, and the photographs were not taken at this site.

=== Flora ===
In the wetlands are narrow buckler-fern, water violet, common skullcap and marsh cincquefoil. There is also bird's eye primrose, saw-wort, marsh valerian (Valeriana dioica), and butterwort growing around bog rush.

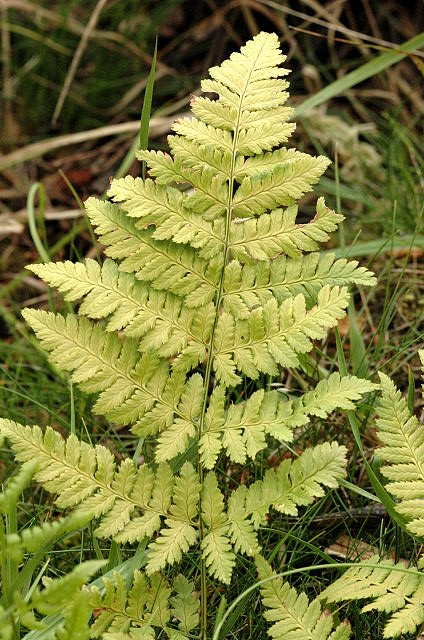
Narrow buckler-fern

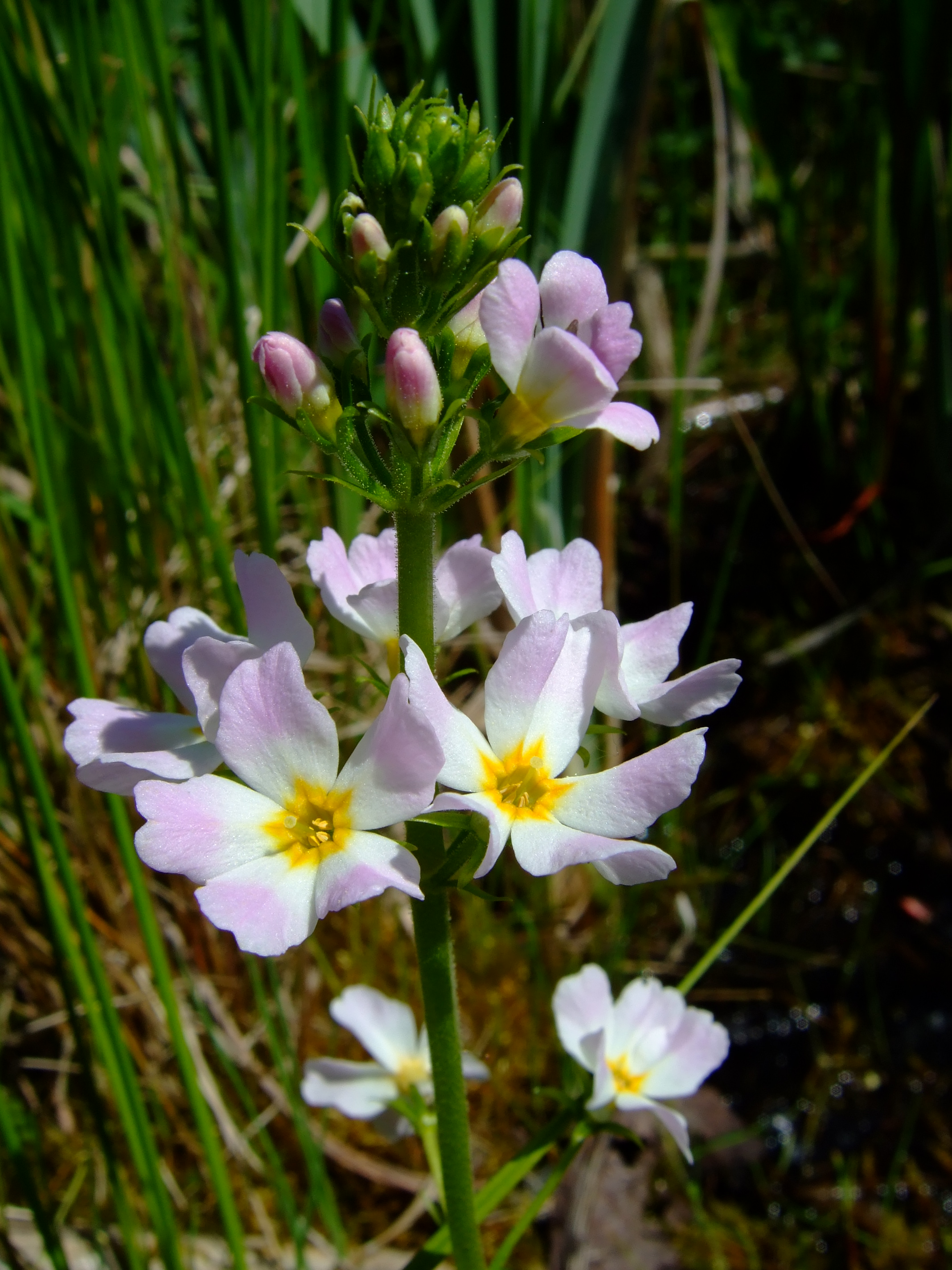
Water violet

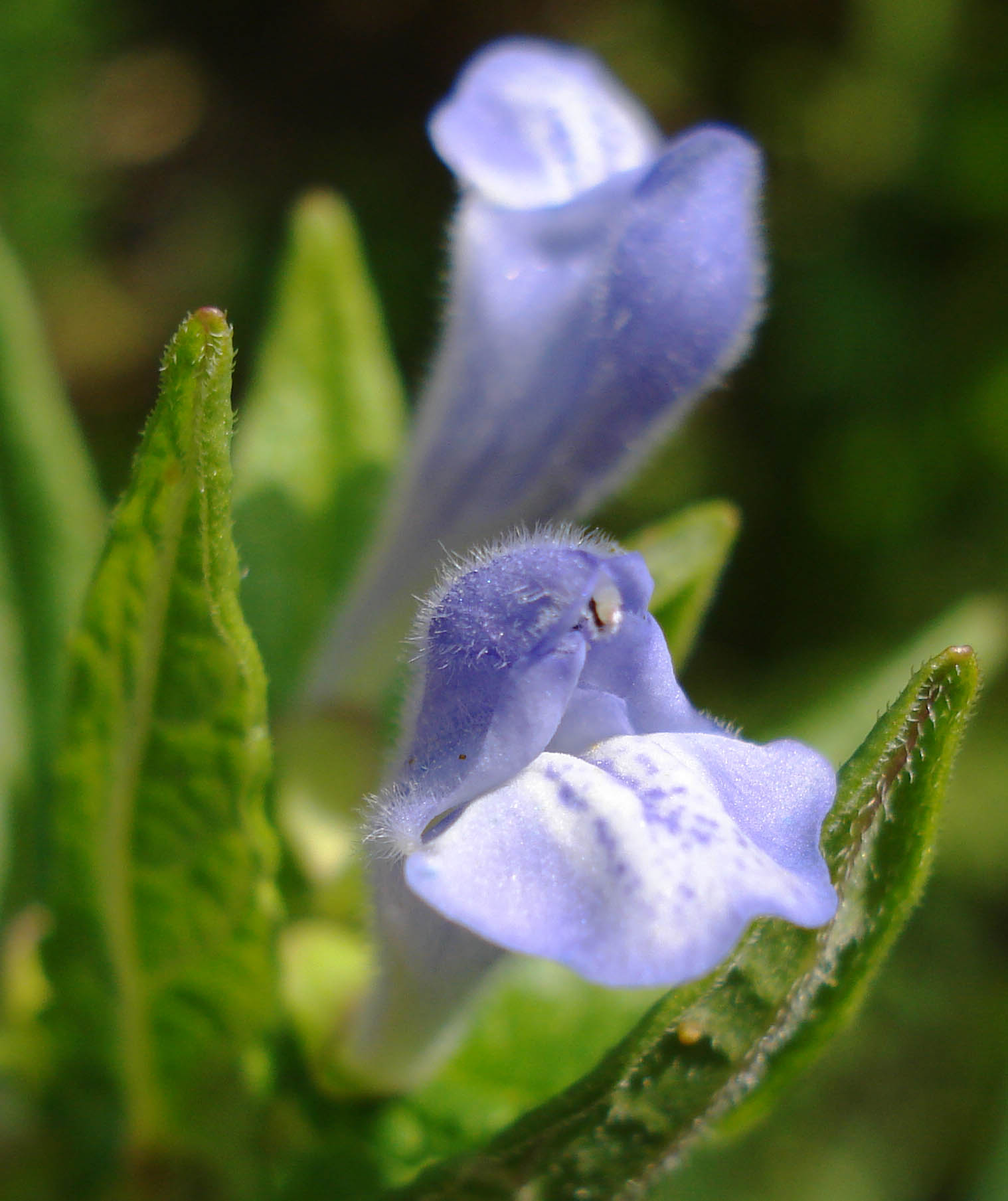
Common skullcap

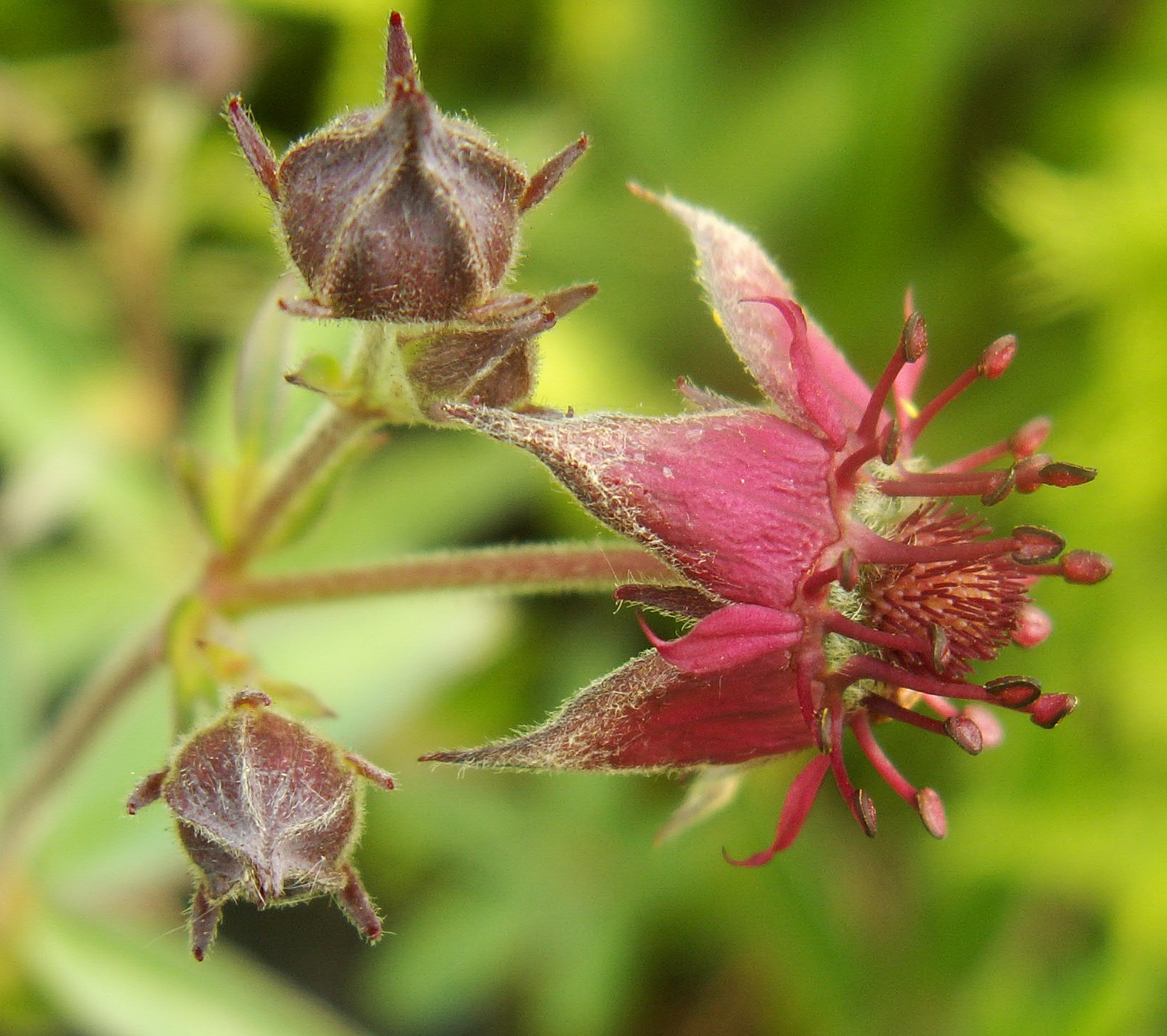
Marsh cincquefoil

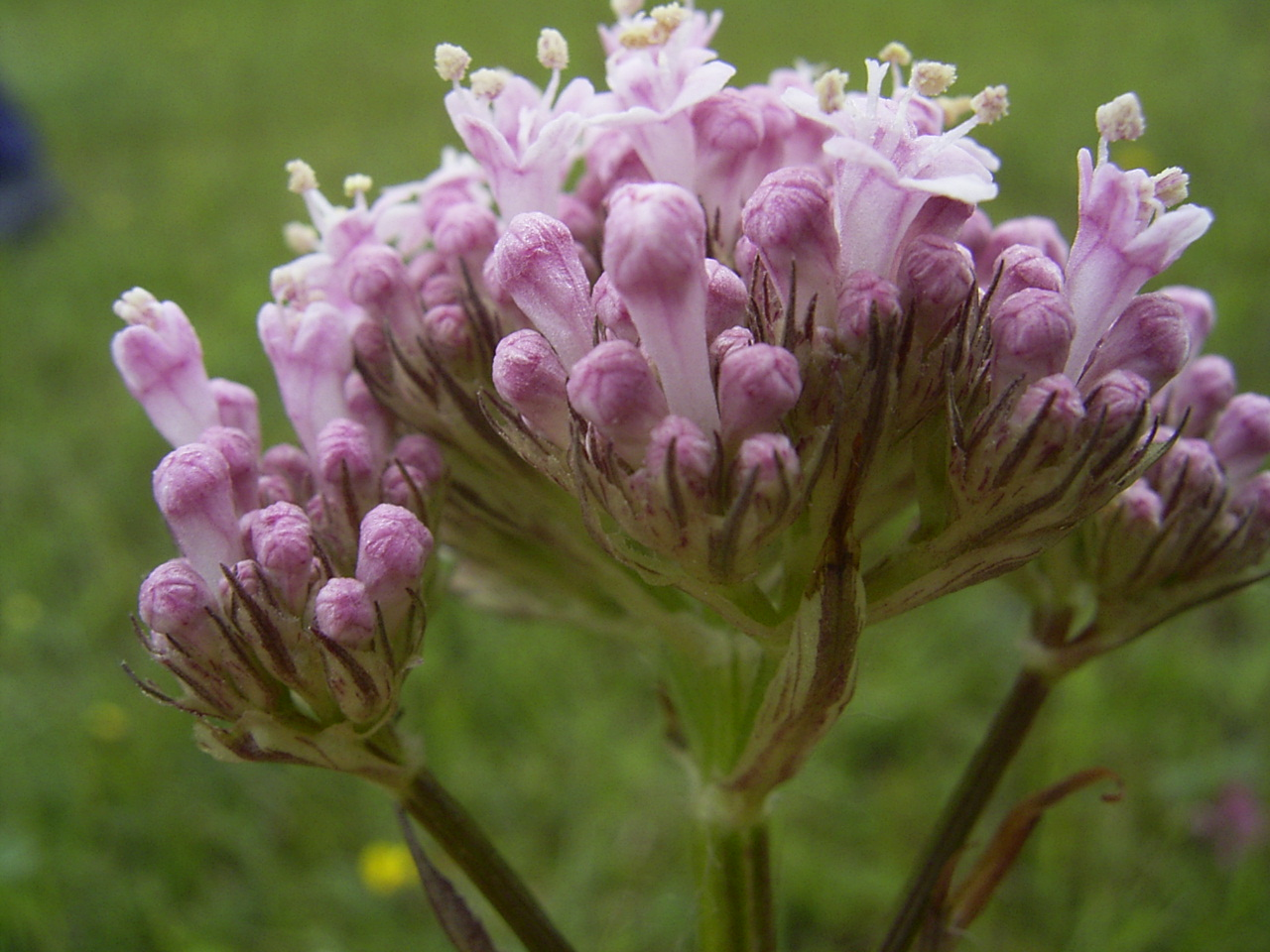
Marsh valerian (Valeriana dioica)

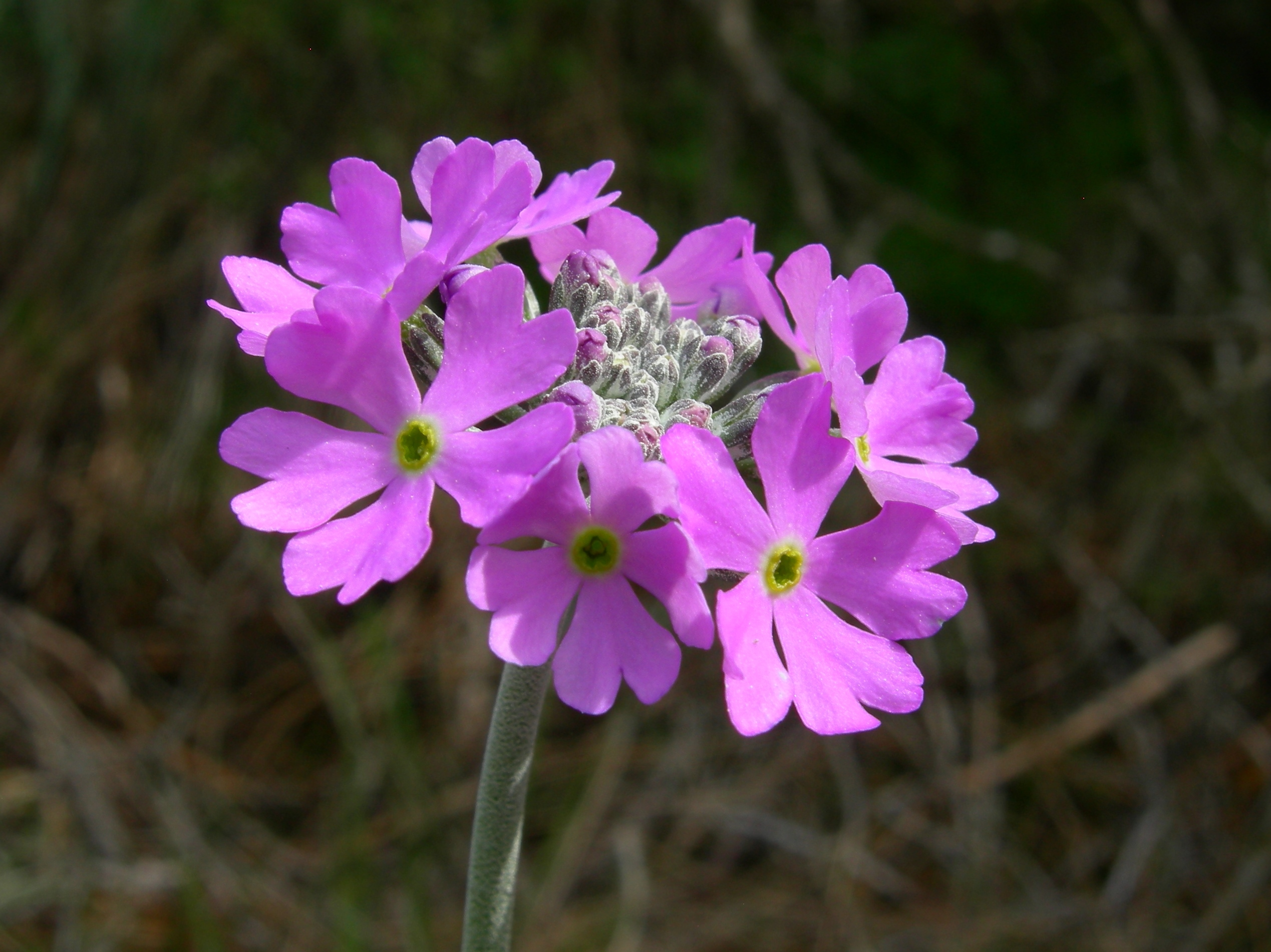
Bird's eye primrose

On calcareous grassland over Magnesian Limestone are felwort and yellow-wort, alongside the more common cowslip, wild thyme and salad burnet.

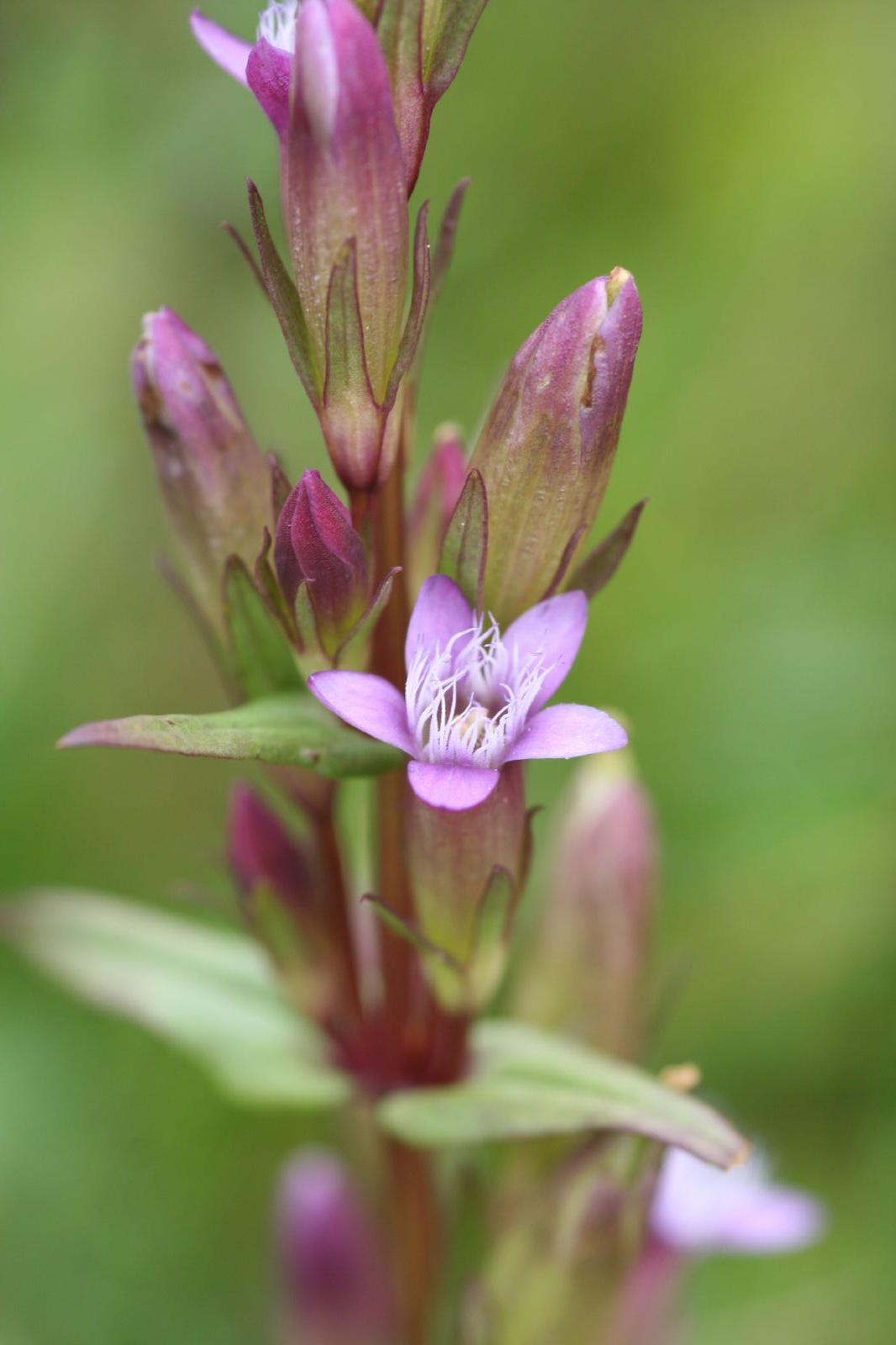
Felwort

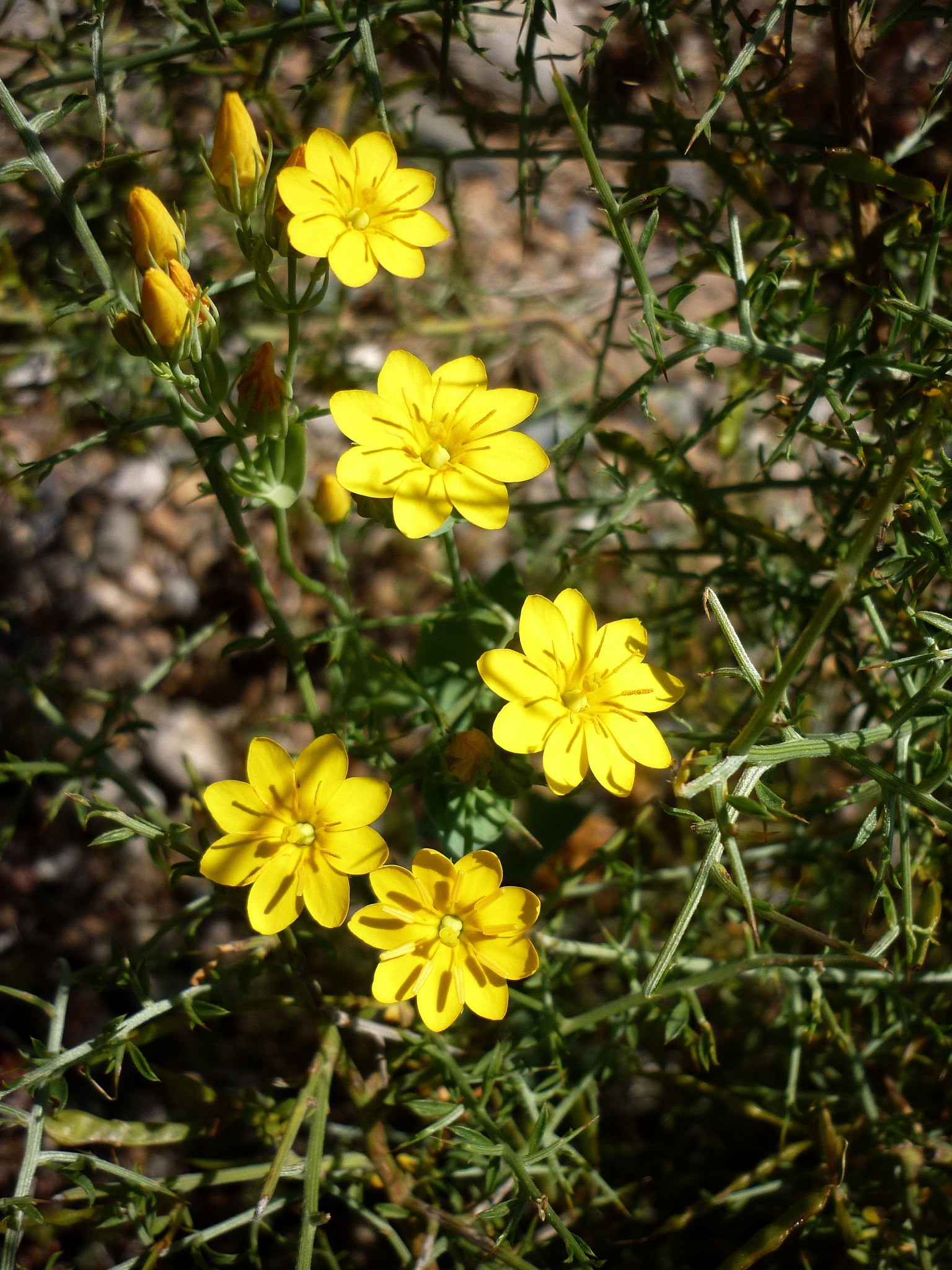
Yellow-wort

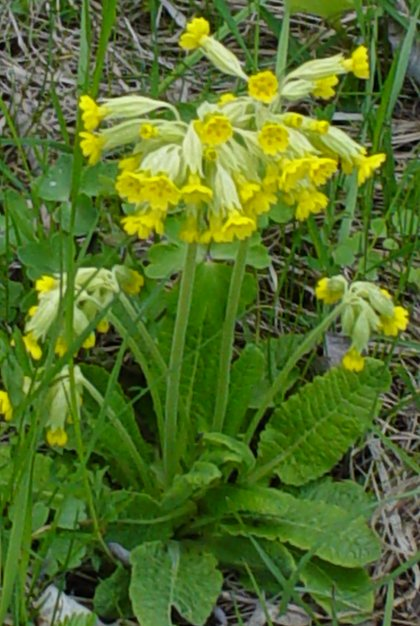
Cowslip

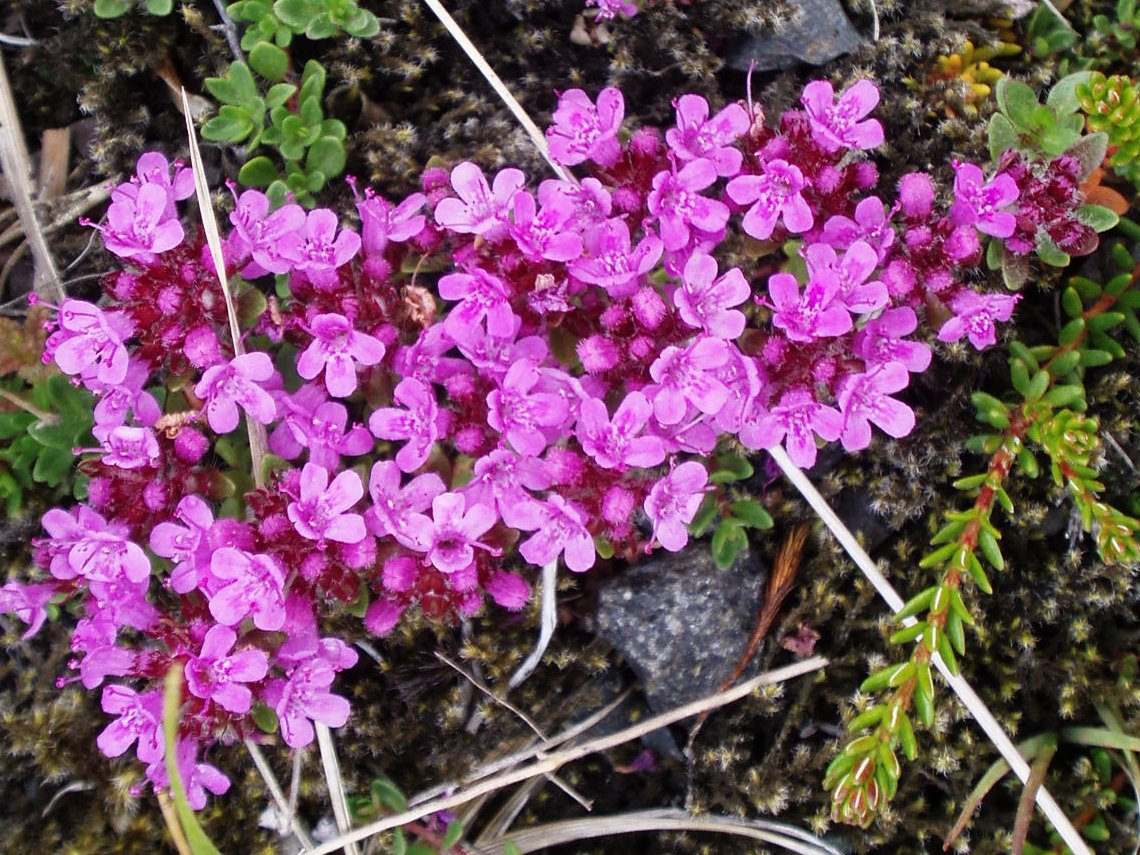
Wild thyme

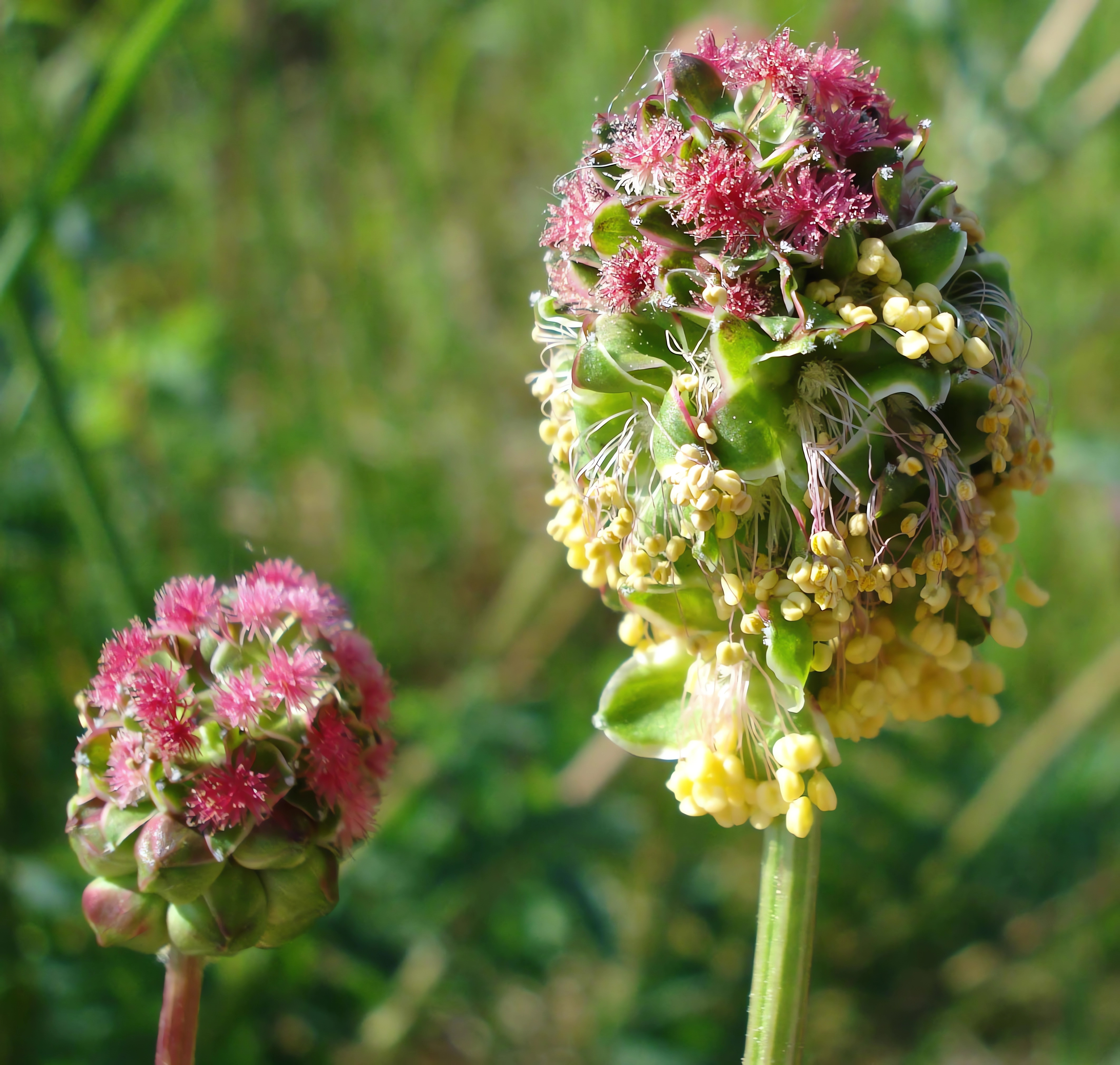
Salad burnet

The more unusual plants on the mixed woodland floor are yellow star-of-Bethlehem. and parasitic toothwort colonies. The more frequent herbaceous plants here are sanicle, bluebell and primrose. In the woodland understorey are spindle and hazel. The canopy is mostly made up of field maple, sycamore, elm and ash.

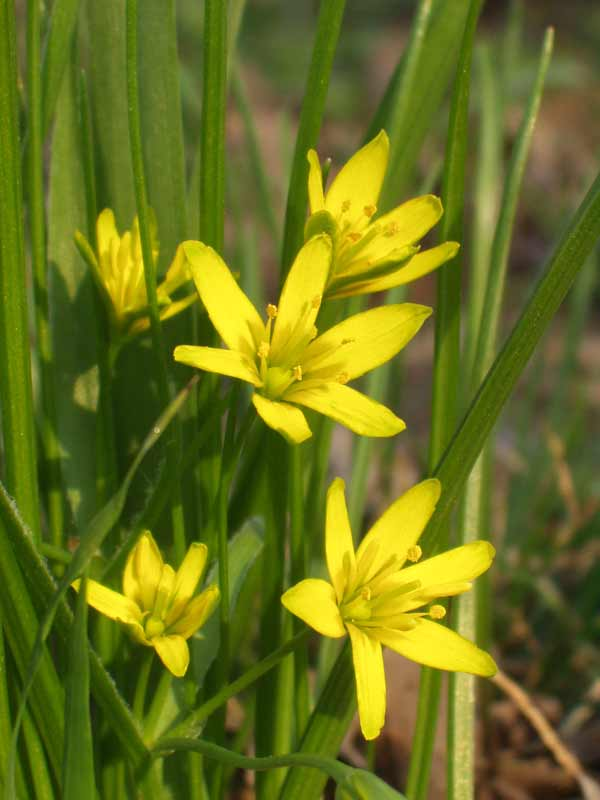
Yellow star-of-Bethlehem

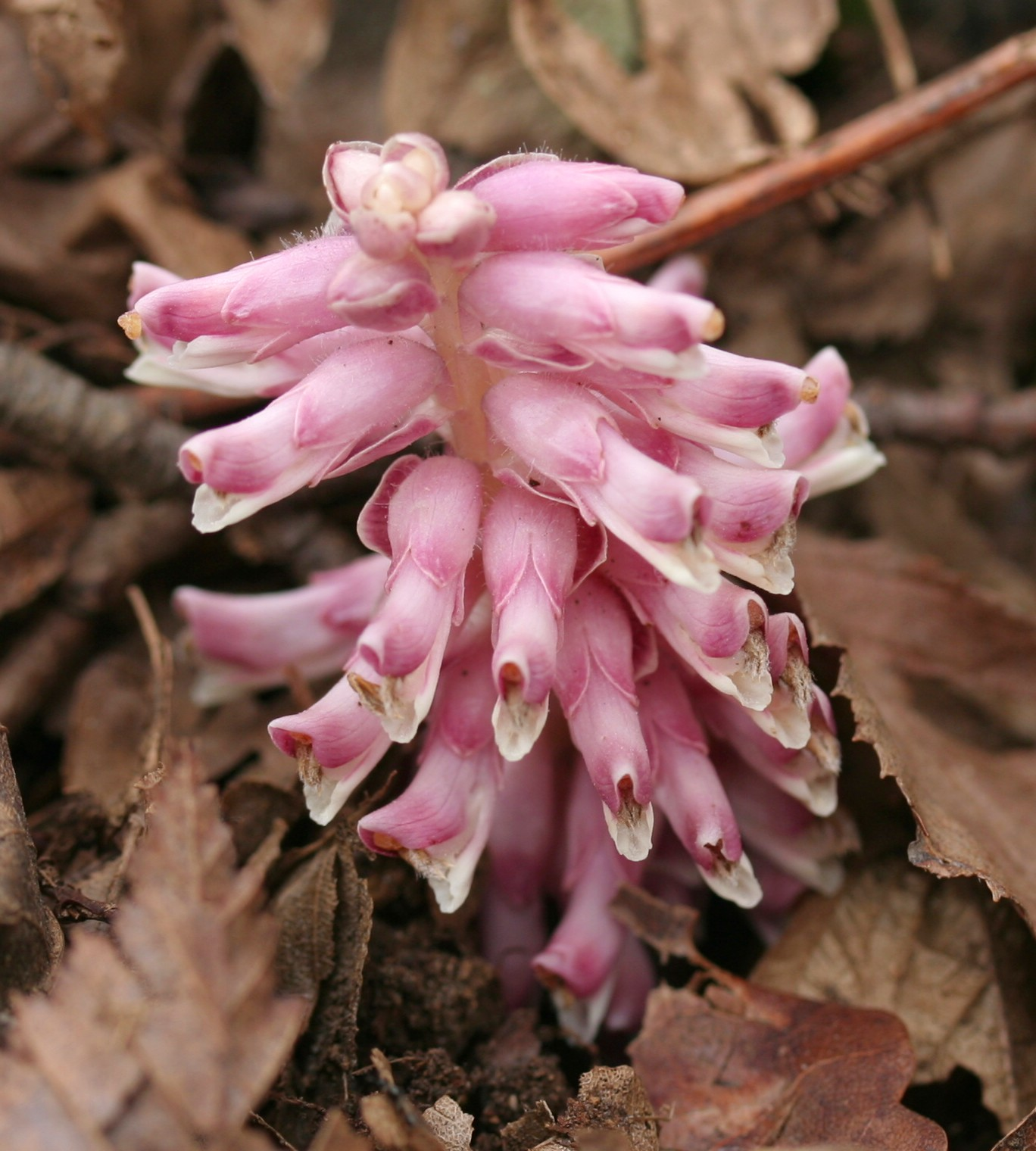
Toothwort

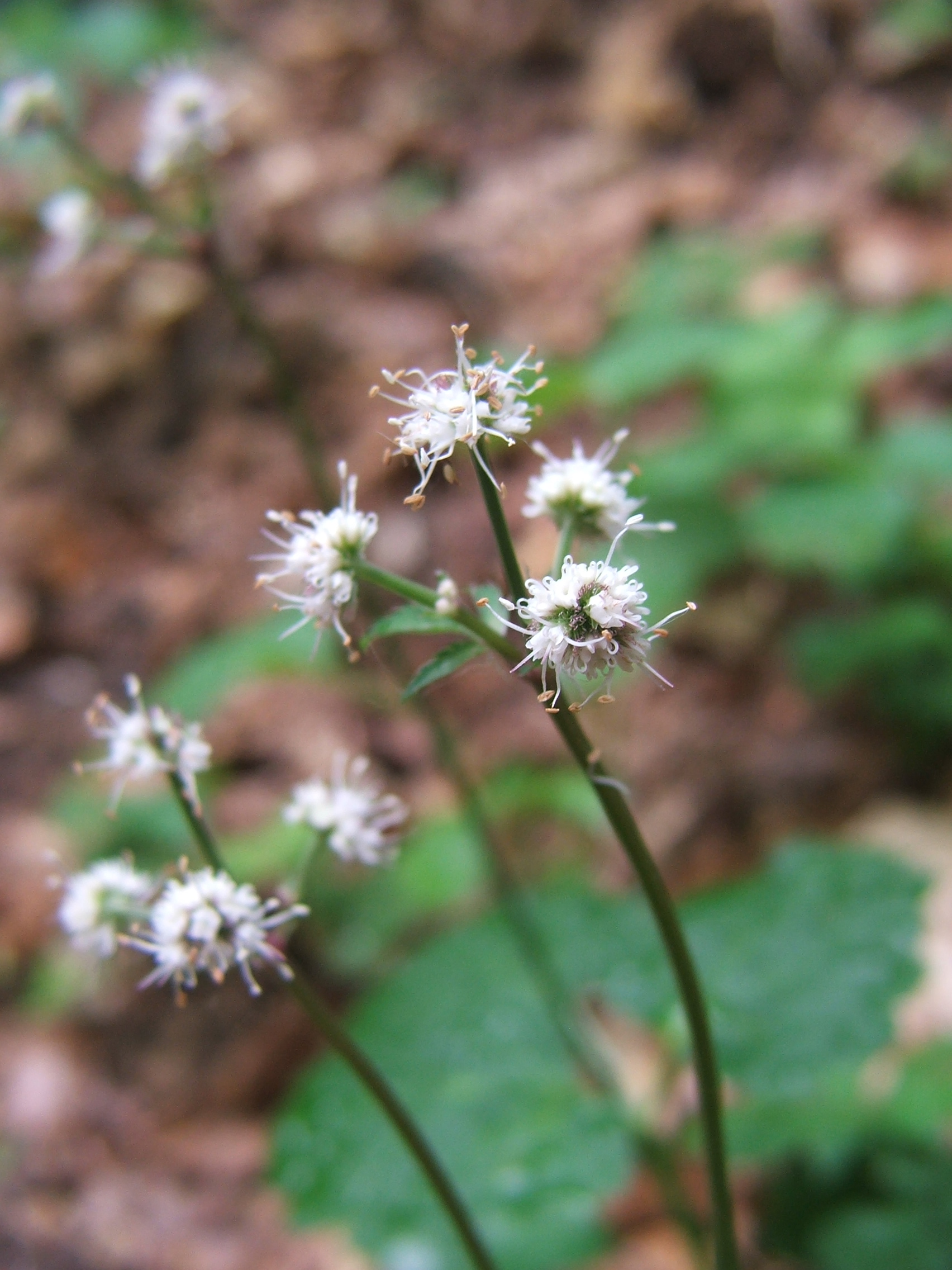
Sanicle

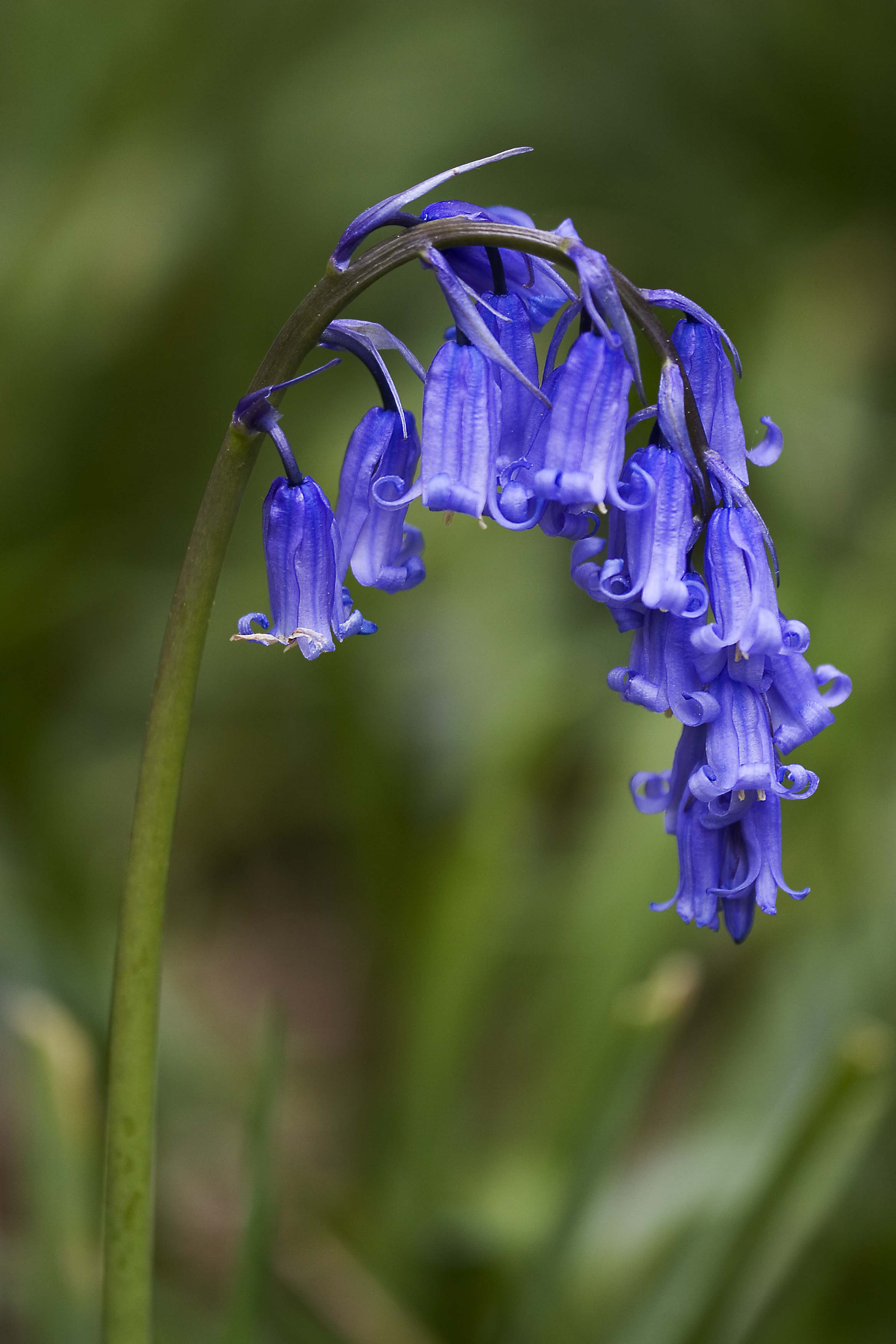
Bluebell

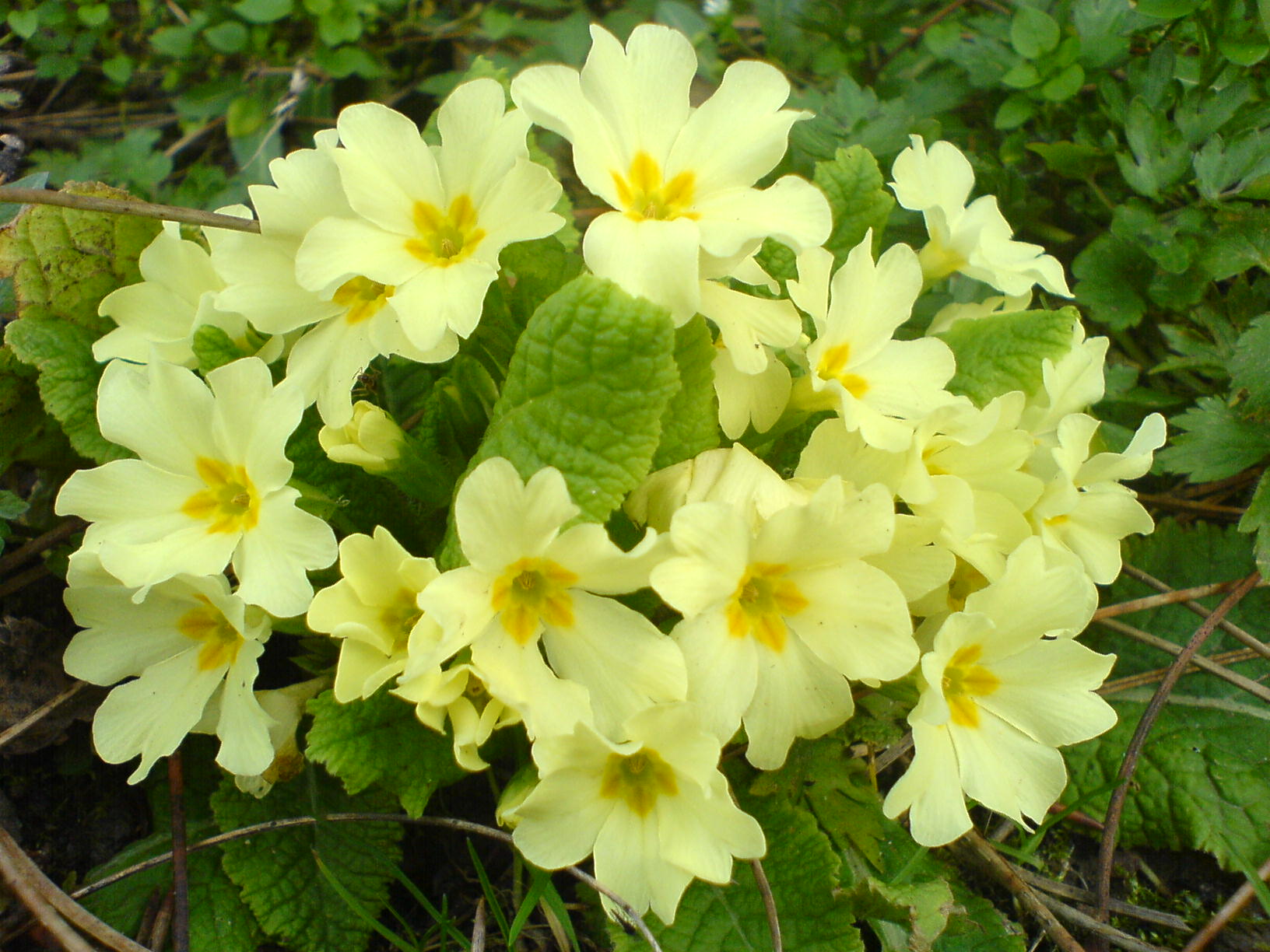
Primrose

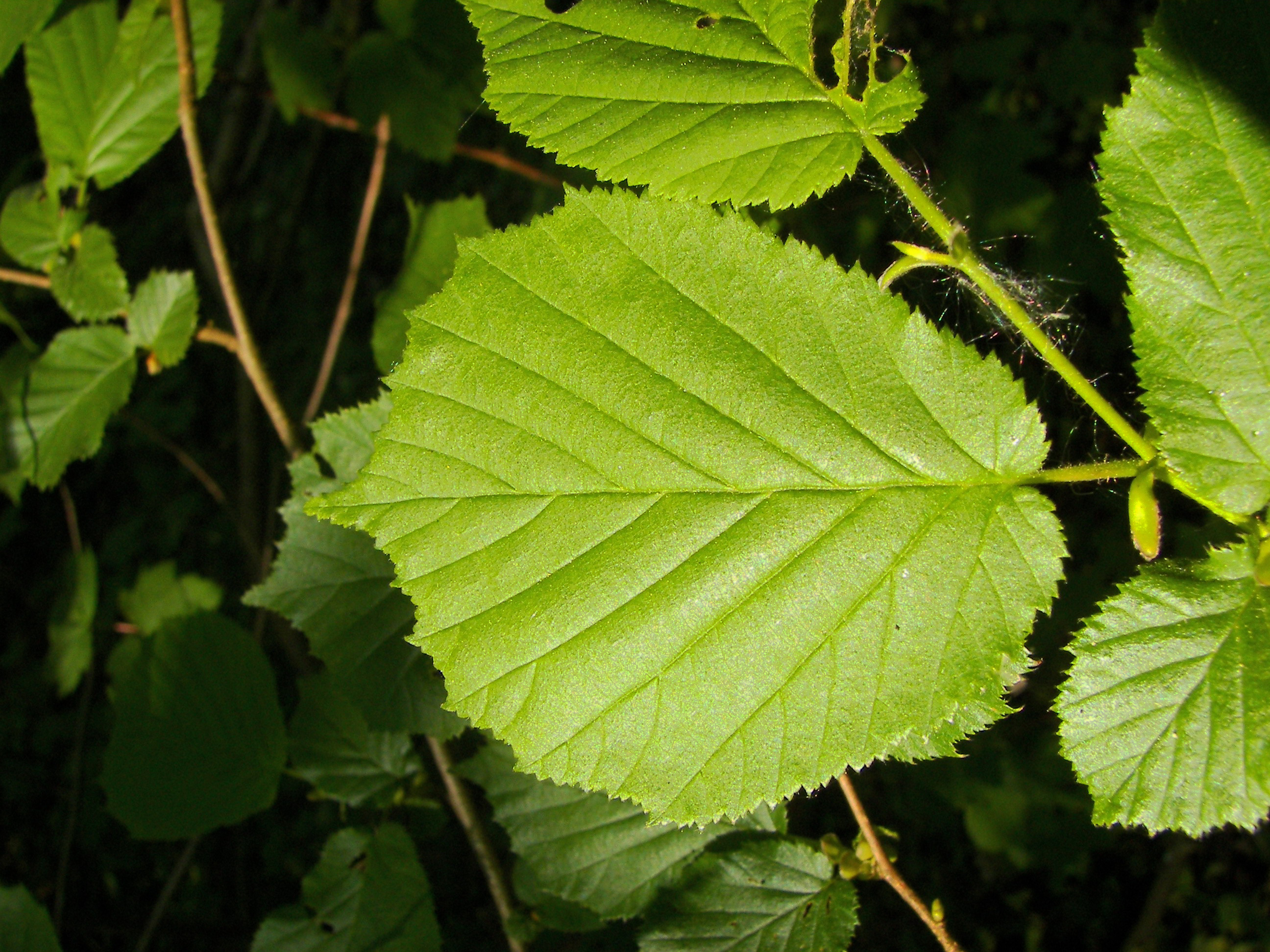
Hazel

=== Fauna ===
==== Birds ====
Along the riverside, birds found here include kingfisher, oystercatcher and waders. In December 2017, members of Harrogate and District Naturalists' Society (HDNS) recorded yellowhammer, bullfinch, tree sparrow, goldfinch, redpoll, siskin, curlew, buzzard, peregrine falcon, mallard, pintail, goldeneye, goosander, wigeon, teal, tufted duck and a large murmuration of starling. Over 10,000 redwing passed through the site in the days following 17 October 2016, and in October and November of that year 1,417 redwing were ringed there.

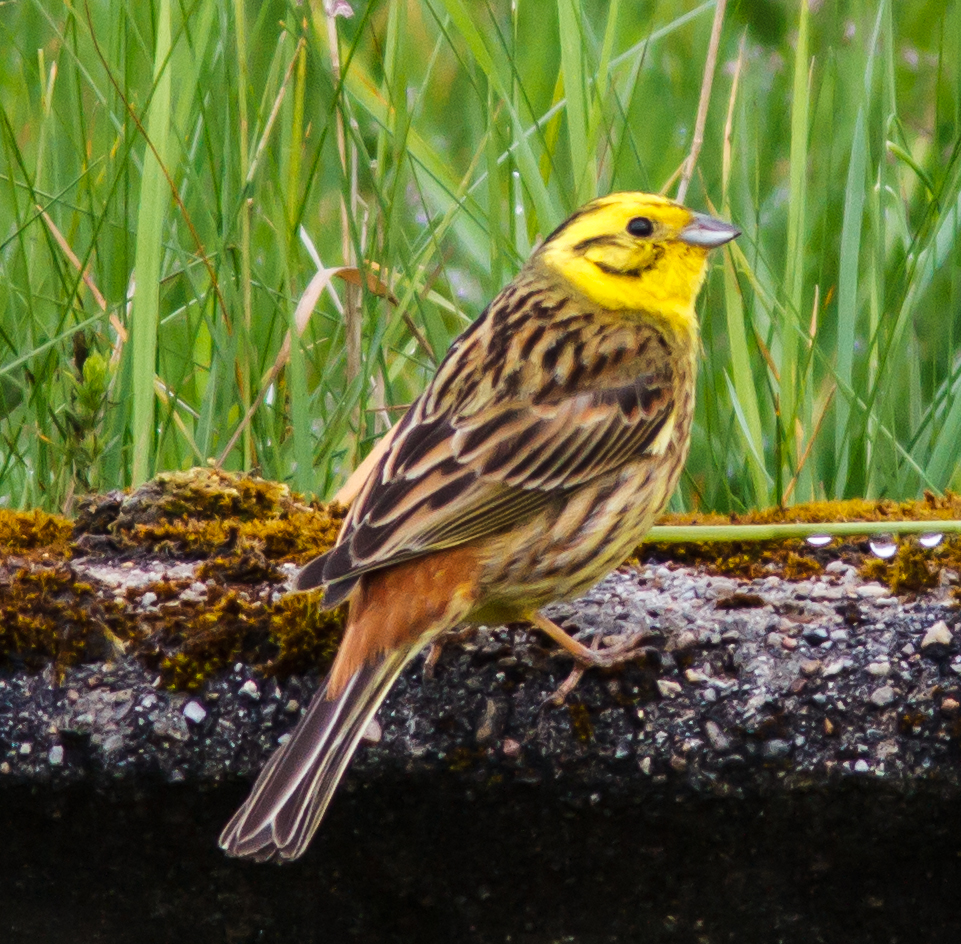
yellowhammer

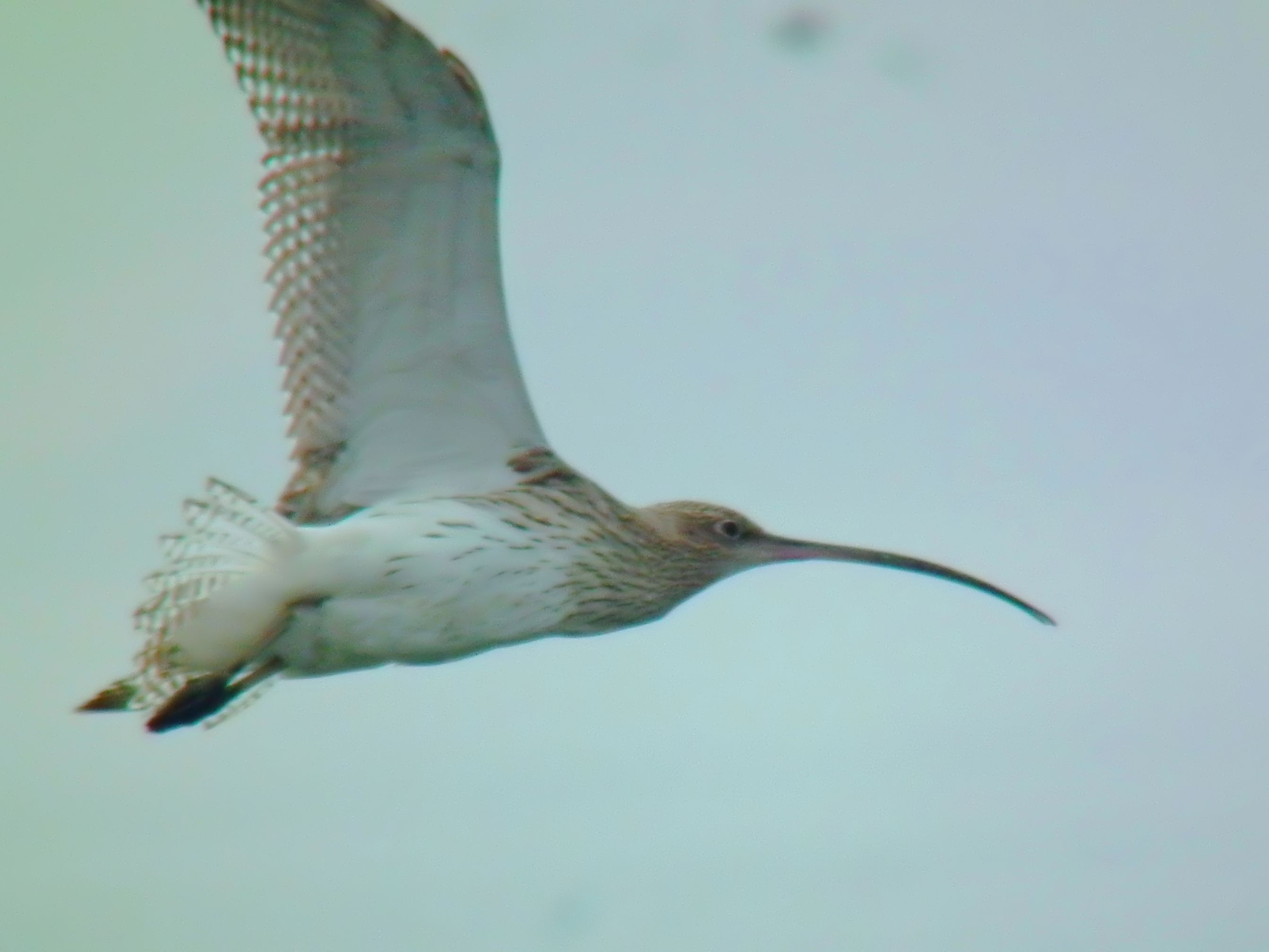
curlew

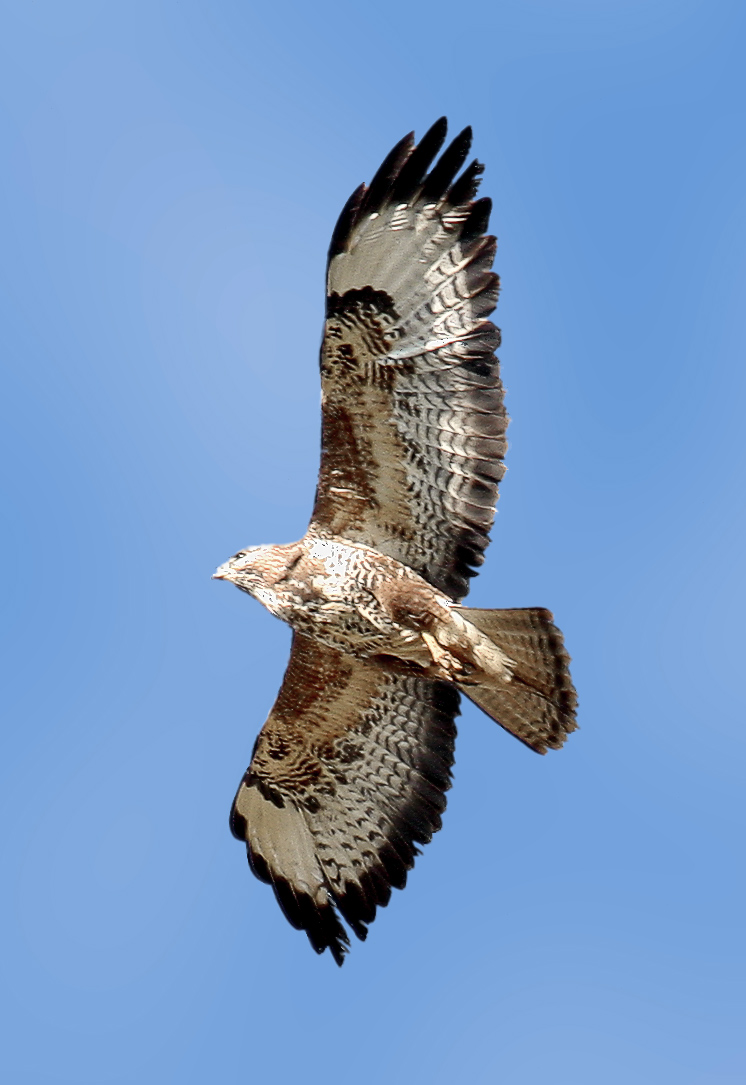
buzzard

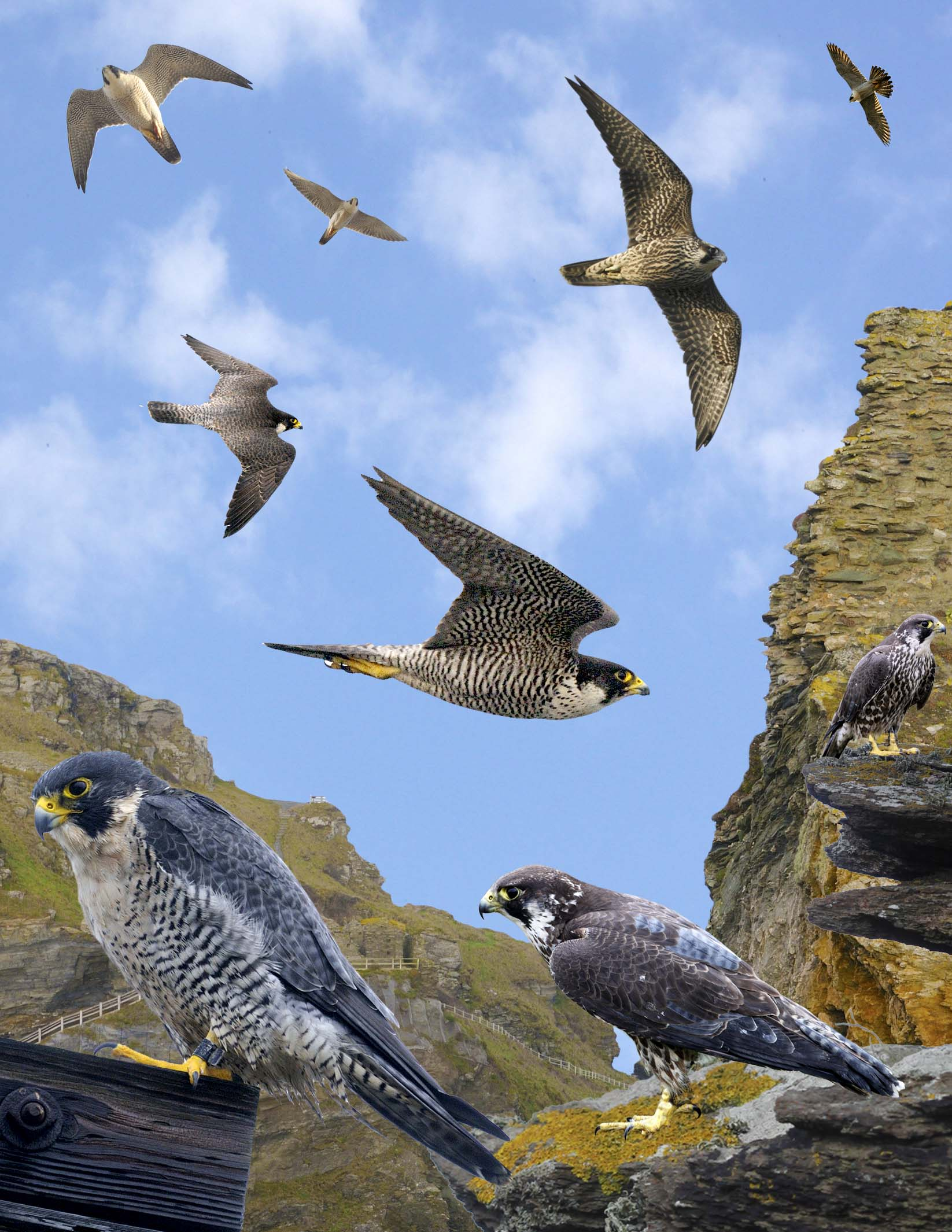
peregrine falcon

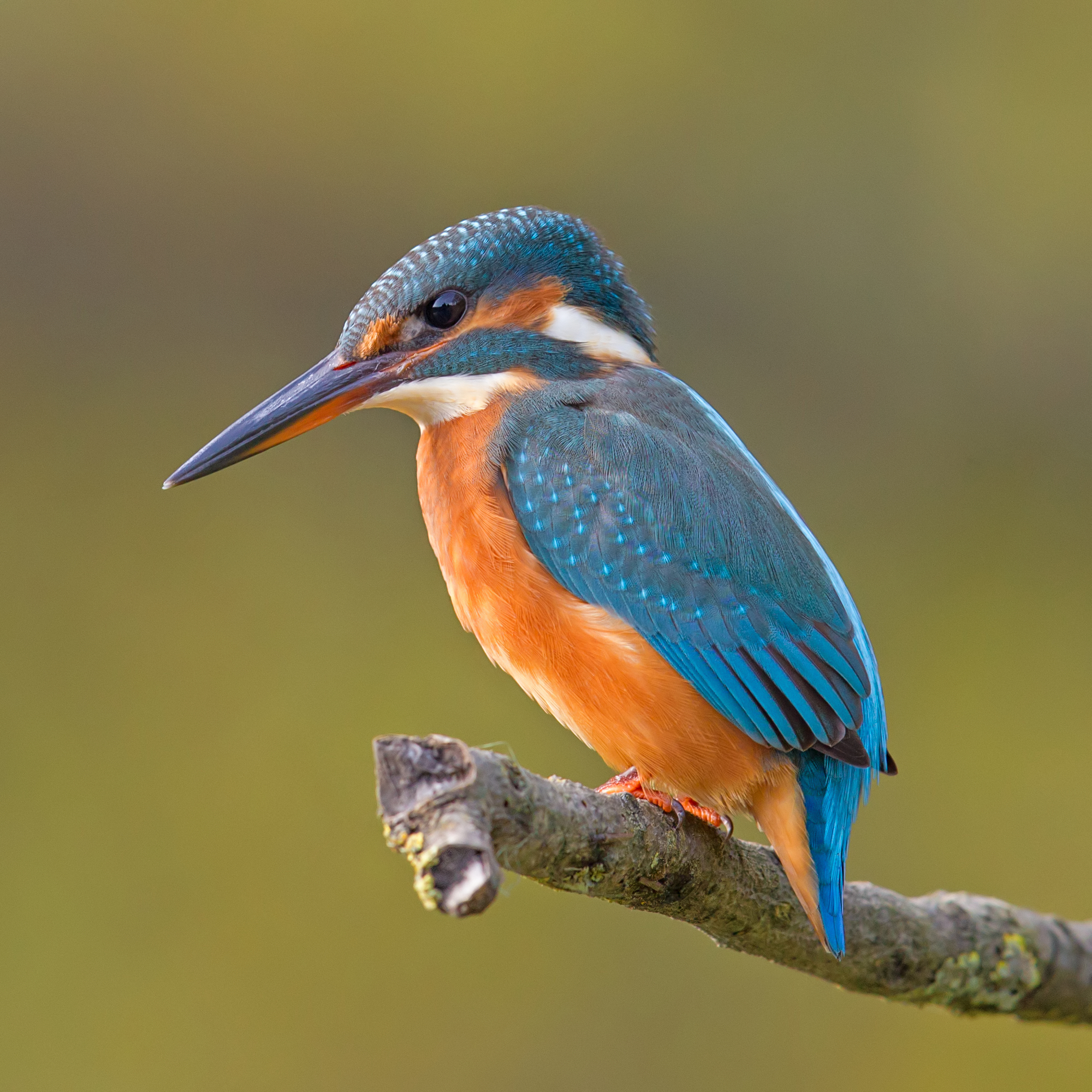
Kingfisher

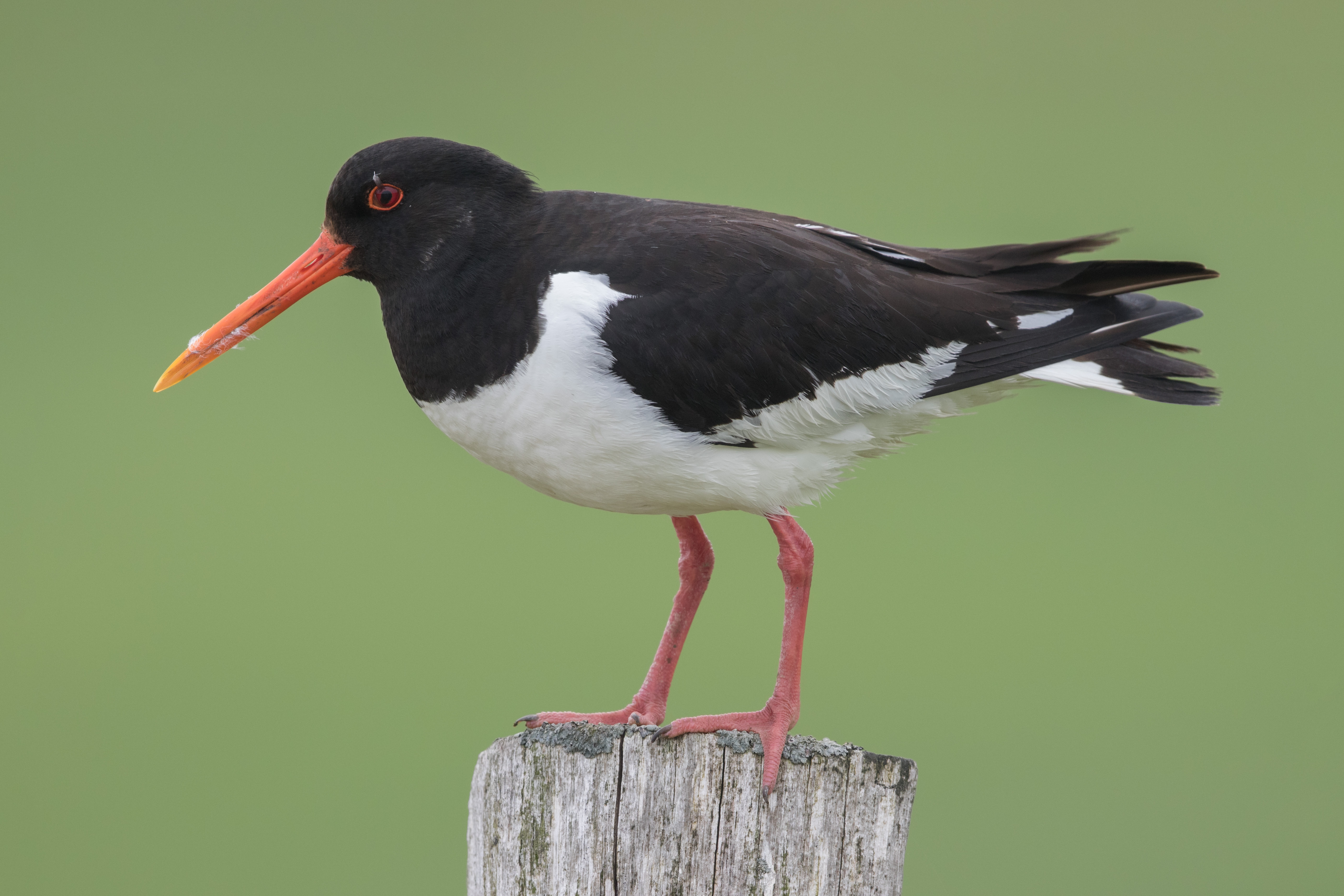
Oystercatcher

==== Amphibians and invertebrates ====
In the wetlands the great crested newt and smooth newt are present. Among the wetlands invertebrates are the bug (Acompus rufipes), the saw-fly (Rhadinocera micans) and the local weevil, (Limnobaris pilistriata).

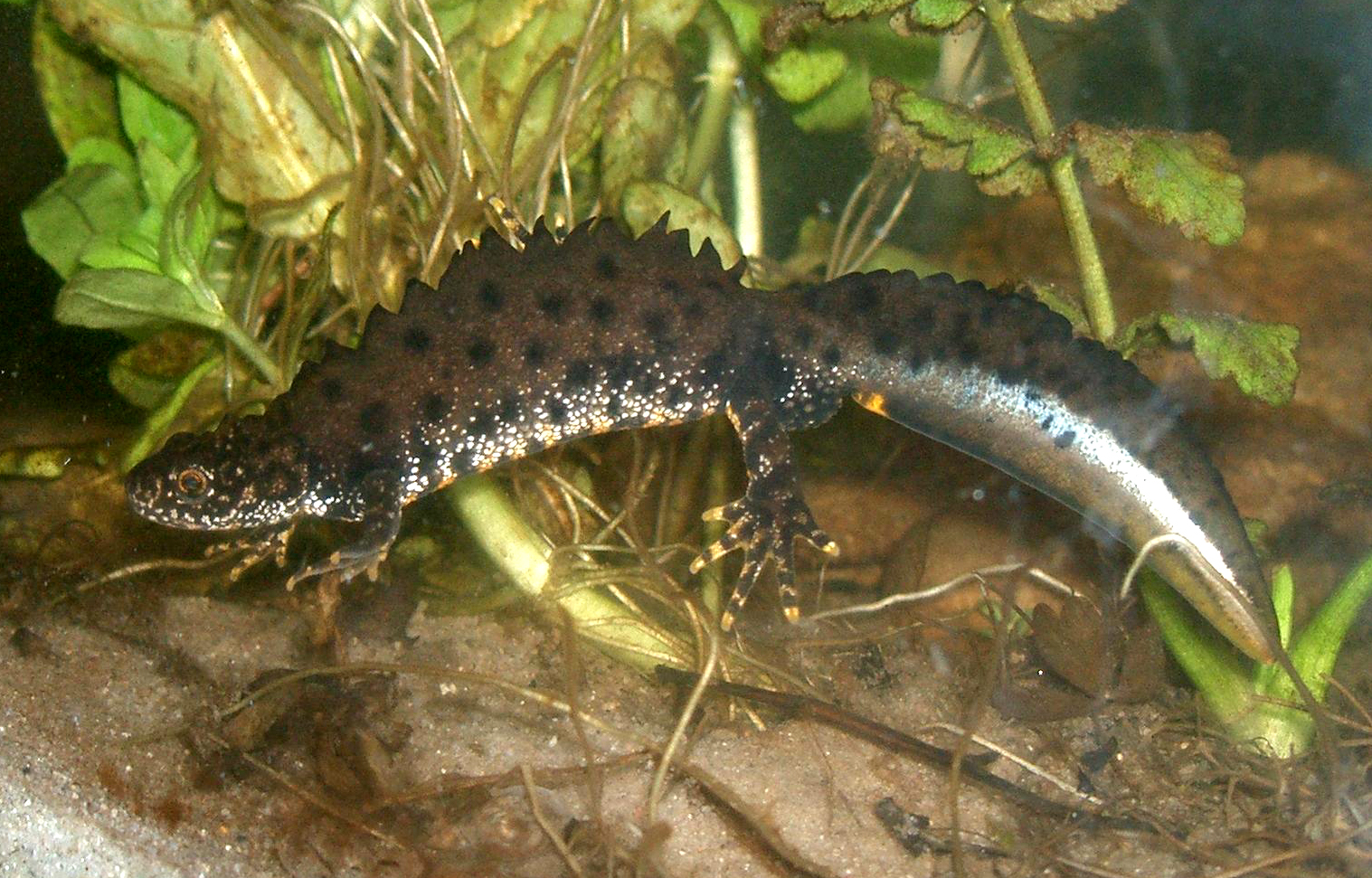
Great crested newt

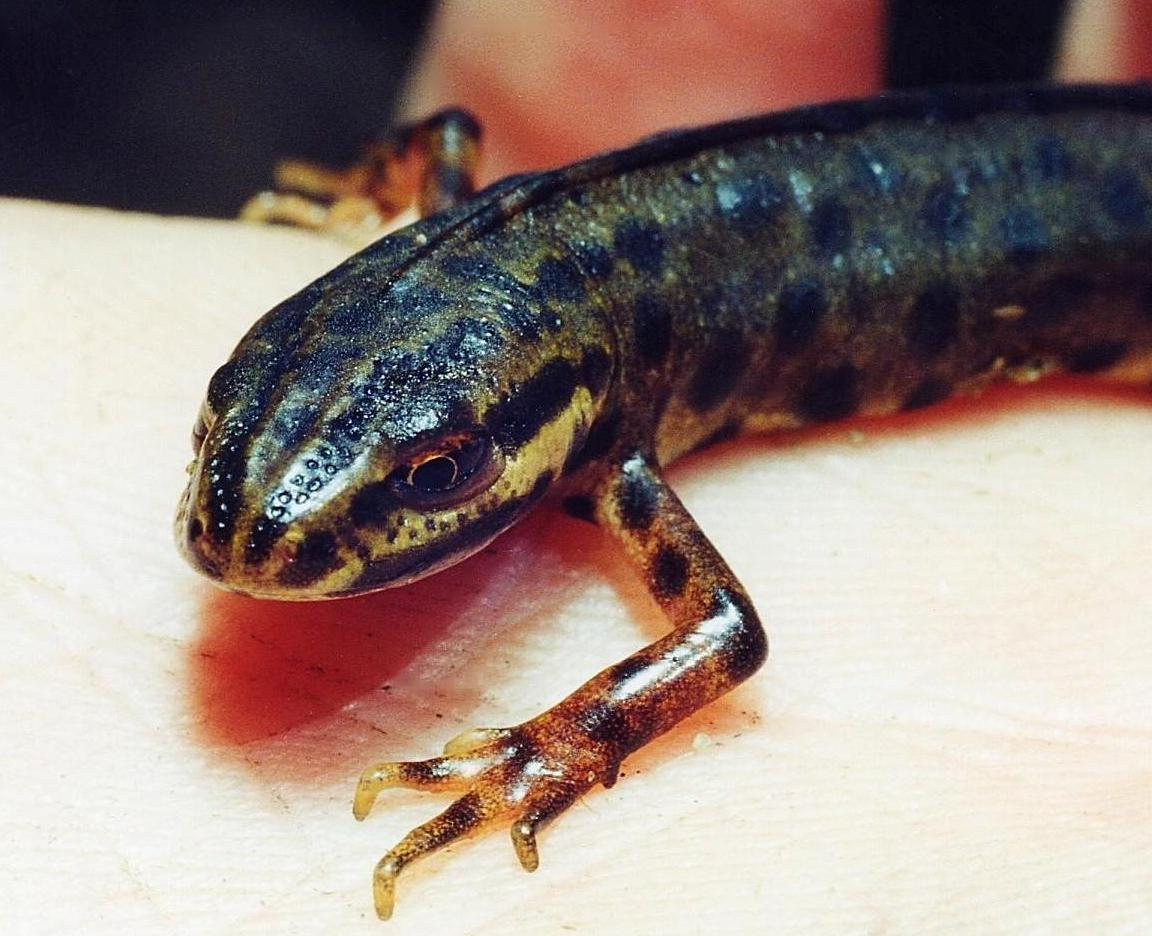
Smooth newt

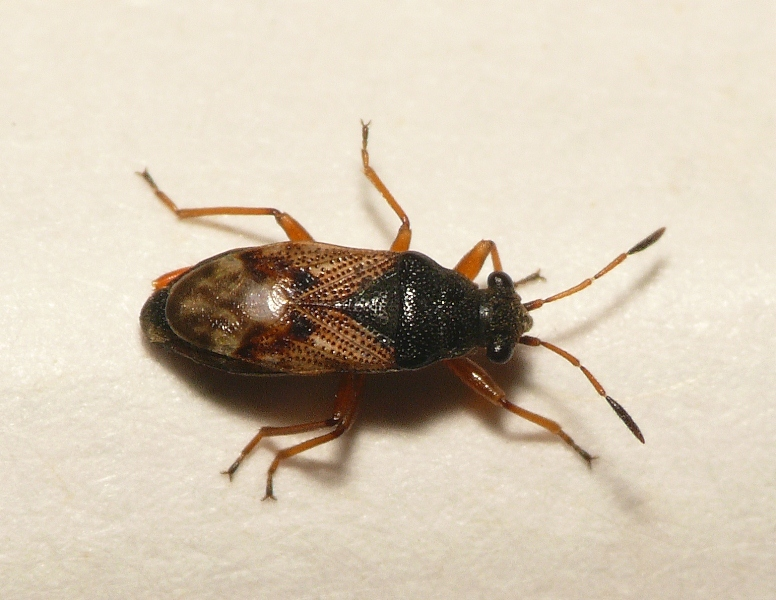
Bug (Acompus rufipes)

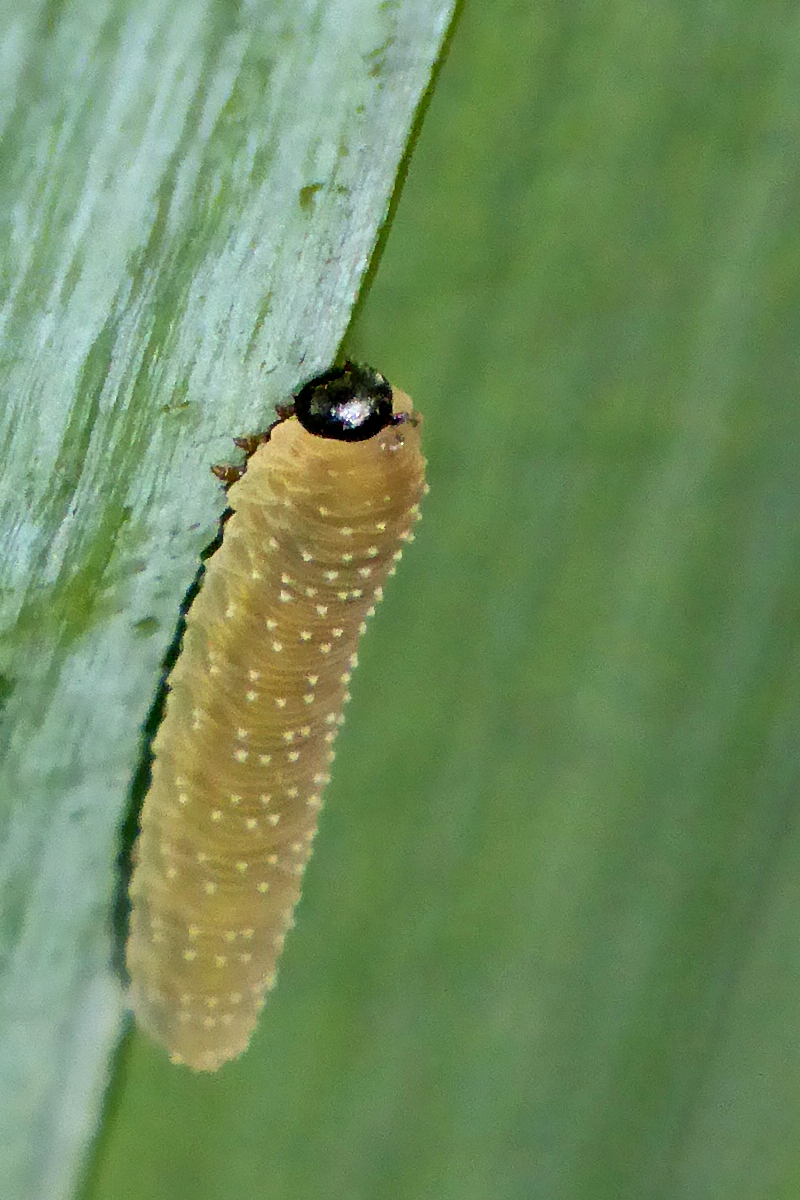
Saw-fly larva (Rhadinocera micans)

== Maintenance ==
All the habitats on this site should be protected from potential pollution by pesticide and fertiliser, including that used on adjacent land. Public access and recreation should be controlled or managed on this site.

=== River ===
The general principle of management of the river is to protect the wildlife habitat, which consists of the water channel, the riverbank and the vegetation upon it.

The channel's form, including natural obstructions such as waterfalls, should be maintained, and artificial modifications should be restored to the natural form where appropriate, to allow fish breeding and movement of wildlife. Channel vegetation should not be cut by more than 50%, to allow seed-setting and wildlife breeding. Exposed river sediment, collapsing banks and timber debris should be left undisturbed, as habitat for invertebrates and other biota. There should be control of invasive species such as Japanese knotweed, Himalayan balsam, signal crayfish and mink. There should be prevention of water pollution where possible, for example, chemicals including phosphorus, and organic pollution, from local and upstream housing, agriculture and industry. Organic pollution should be treated before it enters the river. To prevent soil affecting river ecology, a strip of two metres should be left unploughed along the riverbank.

Floodplains should be maintained as such, or restored where appropriate. Alternative water sources for the floodplain are not acceptable, because the local ecology depends upon the river's mineral content. A variety of vegetation such as grass, fen, scrub and trees should be maintained to promote a variety of flora and fauna. Light grazing by livestock or twice-yearly cutting may be used for this purpose. Riverbank vegetation can be fenced off from livestock to avoid excessive trampling. Any woodland carr, vernal ponds, marsh and oxbow lakes should be maintained to support biodiversity.

=== Ponds ===
Temporary ponds, and ponds without fish, should be maintained as they are, because they support amphibians and certain aquatic plants. Where there is a range of different types of ponds, these should be maintained as such to ensure biodiversity. When a pond becomes silted up, or choked with vegetation, it should be cleared or deepened in small sections to allow recovery at all times. Ponds should be protected from spillages, pollution and entry of nutrients and silt, which would limit diversity of species, or even cause loss of most pondlife. Introduction of coarse fish and the removal of aquatic plants should be avoided, because they disturb the natural ecology. Changes to local land use, especially where water abstraction is involved, should be monitored.

=== Grasslands ===
Marshy grassland should be mowed annually, to prevent a prevalence of tall rushes and grasses with dead vegetation below, because this would limit growth of more delicate plants. Annual light grazing by cattle, ponies or hill sheep, between late spring and early autumn, is recommended – although this should not be allowed to disturb marsh fritillary butterflies or nesting birds. A hedge and some scrub is beneficial in an around the marsh. Existing ditches and drains should be maintained in their traditional shape and condition.

Calcareous grassland is at risk of overgrowth by scrub and rank grass, which inhibits specialised vegetation. Light annual grazing and trampling by livestock is recommended, to promote a variety of vegetation, without overgrazing. A small amount of scrub can be permitted for nesting birds and other biota.

=== Scrub and woodland ===
Scrub in the UK is defined as small trees, such as juniper, rowan and hawthorn, and bushes. Scrub, and the transitional area between it and adjacent grassland, supports a diversity of species. It should be maintained such that it comprises various heights and densities of growth, with some areas cut to produce patches of grassland. Light grazing may help to manage these requirements. Fencing may be needed in some places to prevent overgrazing or to allow spread of scrub.

The best way to manage woodland carr which includes ash, willow and alder is to leave it alone. Old trees will then fall and create glades, although the environment must be made safe where there is public access. If the woodland appears to be encroaching on grassland and taking its sunlight, coppicing may solve the problem.

=== Great crested newt ===
In this site it is necessary to protect the habitat of the great crested newt. They need land for feeding and hiding, and water for breeding. Breeding ponds should be unshaded, not too deep, and near other breeding ponds and suitable land. Shallow slopes will allow warming sunlight, and deeper areas will provide safe shelter. Trees, therefore, should be on the north side only, to avoid excess shadow. Newts need aquatic plant cover, but no predatory fish. Late autumn and early winter are the best times for maintenance work to be done here. For foraging, newts need grassland, scrub and woodland close to the pond. They can hibernate in tree roots, under ancient hedges, in rubble, woodpiles and drystone walls. They can travel via ditches and hedges, from pond to pond, if there are no barriers.

== Development and risk assessment ==
=== Assessment by Natural England ===
The protected habitat sets within this lowland SSSI consist of broadleaved, mixed and yew woodland, neutral and calcareous grasslands, bogs, standing open water and canals, and rivers and streams. Natural England has divided this SSSI into 17 units for assessment purposes, and all were assessed between 2010 and 2013. Six of the units were deemed to be in favourable condition: all the river and stream units (15, 16 and 17); one woodland unit (4, Fox Covert); one standing open water and canal unit (7, Black Heath ponds); one neutral grassland unit (10, Yorkshire Wildlife Trust field).

Nine units were judged to be in unfavourable but recovering condition. Unit 1 (High Batts nature reserve), of broadleaved, mixed and yew woodland, was suffering from "insufficient natural regeneration," but was showing gradual improvement. Unit 2 (High Batts calcareous grassland), contained too much burnet rose, but this was gradually being removed. Units 5 (Fox Covert marsh and bogs), 6 (Fox Covert neutral grassland) and 8 (Round Hill calcareous grassland), needed more scrub control and grazing than they had yet received. Woodland units 9 (Sike Wood), 12, 13 and 14 were also adjudged unfavourable but recovering, although no explanation was given.

Two units were assessed as unfavourable with no change. Units 3 (woodland by Ure) and 11 (Yorkshire Wildlife Trust woodland), suffered "lack of representative ground flora" due to the invasive species Himalayan balsam and sycamore, lack of regeneration and over-mature trees. Protection of saplings from deer-browsing was recommended.

=== Historical damage ===
In 1982, Ripon Parks had SSSI status but the designation was not yet enshrined in law due to the Wildlife and Countryside Act 1981 which allowed a three-month waiting period between designation and legal protection. This loophole meant that one 6.5 hectares (0.07 km^{2}; 0.03 sq mi) calcareous grassland-and-marsh meadow on the site was rotovated and reseeded by a tenant farmer. The field previously had 90 different species of plants, including a large patch of marsh orchids. Reed bunting and curlew had nested there. The damage happened because, in spite of a request by the Nature Conservancy Council (NCC), the Property Services Agency (PSA) did not inform prospective tenants of the pending SSSI designation. On 8 May 1982, the NCC informed one new tenant of his obligations of care two days after he had taken over the property, and on 10 May that tenant responded by rotovating the field.

=== Planning applications ===
In 2009 Hanson Quarry Products, who ran Ripon Quarry adjacent to North Staining, the River Ure, High Batts and Ripon Parks, made an application to North Yorkshire County Council to extend their works by 98 acres (0.4 km^{2}; 0.2 sq mi). An environmental impact assessment was required because the extension was more than 62 acres (0.3 km^{2}; 0.1 sq mi). As of 2019, Hanson has a biodiversity action plan for Ripon Quarry.

In October 2016, North Yorkshire County Council published a document called Identification of areas of search for sand and gravel, which is intended to provide information which will assist the local authority to plan ahead until 2030 for land use with respect to sand and gravel quarrying, and its effect on the environment and people. Various SSSIs, including Ripon Parks, are considered in this document.

=== Hunting ===
In 1990, the York and Bedale Hunt had a licence to hunt on Ministry of Defence land on the Ripon Parks site. A question was asked in Parliament about it on 5 April 1990 by Mr. Meale.

== See also ==
Besides Ripon Parks, there are several SSSIs in the Harrogate region. The others are Bishop Monkton Ings, Brimham Rocks, Cow Myers, Farnham Mires, Hack Fall Wood, Hay-a-Park, Kirk Deighton Mar Field Fen, and Quarry Moor
