= George Spence (MP) =

English jurist and politician (1787–1850)

George Spence, QC (1787 – 12 December 1850) was an English jurist and politician.

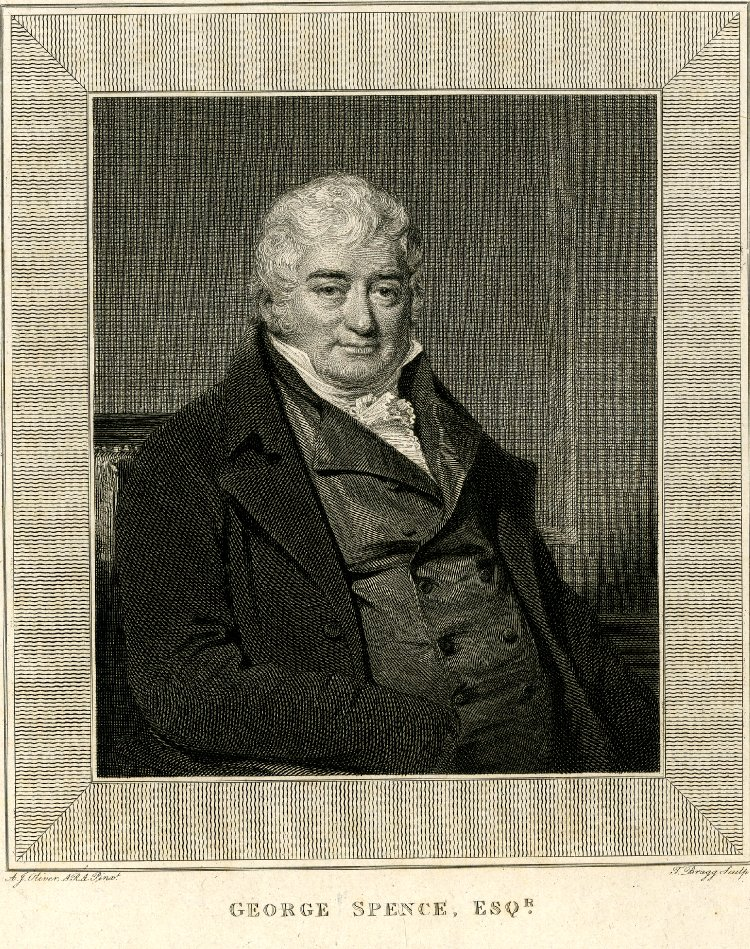
George Spence

== Life ==
The second son of Thomas Richard Spence, a surgeon of Hanover Square, London, he was educated at a private school at Richmond, Surrey, and at the University of Glasgow, where he matriculated in 1802, and graduated M.A. on 11 April 1805. After some time spent in the office of a London solicitor, he was admitted in 1806 a student at the Inner Temple, where he was called to the bar on 28 June 1811; he was then elected a bencher in 1835, reader in 1845, and treasurer in 1846.

A pupil of the equity draughtsman John Bell, Spence rapidly acquired an extensive practice, most of which he lost on taking silk (27 December 1834). He was returned to parliament in the Tory interest for Reading on 20 June 1826, but was unseated on petition (26 March 1827). He then (2 March 1829) secured the Ripon seat, which he retained as Member of Parliament until the dissolution of December 1832. Both in and out of parliament he made some ineffectual attempts to raise the question of chancery reform. In the divisions on the Great Reform Bill he voted against his party; he did not, however, seek election to the new parliament.

On 12 December 1850 Spence died of self-inflicted wounds at his residence, 42 Hyde Park Square.

== Works ==
Spence was an early activist for legal education, and an original member of the Society for promoting the Amendment of the Law, founded in 1844. During the last years of his life he worked on his major work, The Equitable Jurisdiction of the Court of Chancery; comprising its Rise, Progress, and final Establishment, London, 1846–9, 2 vols. It became a standard authority. He was also author of:

- An Essay on the Origin of the English Laws and Institutions, read to the Society of Clifford's Inn in Hilary Term, 1812, 1812.
- An Inquiry into the Origin of the Laws and Political Institutions of Modern Europe, particularly those of England, London, 1826.
- The Code Napoléon, or the French Civil Code literally translated, by a Barrister of the Inner Temple, 1827.
- Reform of the Court of Chancery, London, 1830.
- An Address to the Public, and more especially to the Members of the House of Commons, on the present unsatisfactory state of the Court of Chancery, London, 1839.
- Second Address, same place and year.
- Documents and Propositions relating to the Masters' Offices, London, 1842.

== Family ==
Spence married, in 1819, Anne Kelsall, daughter of a solicitor of Chester, who with issue survived him. Donald Spence Jones was their son.

== Notes ==
Attribution

This article incorporates text from a publication now in the public domain: Lee, Sidney, ed. (1898). "Spence, George". Dictionary of National Biography. Vol. 53. London: Smith, Elder & Co.

Parliament of the United Kingdom
Preceded by Charles Fyshe Palmer; John Berkeley Monck	Member of Parliament for Reading; 1826–1827; With: John Berkeley Monck	Succeeded by John Berkeley Monck; Charles Fyshe Palmer
Preceded by Sir Robert Inglis, Bt; Louis Hayes Petit	Member of Parliament for Ripon; 1829–1832; With: Louis Hayes Petit	Succeeded by Thomas Staveley; Joshua Crompton
