= North Stainley with Sleningford =

Civil parish in North Yorkshire, England

Coordinates: 54.19°N 1.56°W

- Population: 737 (Including Eavestone. 2011 census)
- OS grid reference: SE283750
- Civil parish: North Stainley with Sleningford
- Unitary authority: North Yorkshire
- Ceremonial county: North Yorkshire
- Region: Yorkshire and the Humber
- Country: England
- Sovereign state: United Kingdom
- Post town: RIPON
- Postcode district: HG4
- Police: North Yorkshire
- Fire: North Yorkshire
- Ambulance: Yorkshire
- Website: www.northstainleyparishcouncil.btck.co.uk

North Stainley with Sleningford is a civil parish in the county of North Yorkshire, England. The principal settlement and only village in the parish is North Stainley. The parish also includes the small settlements of Sleningford, North Lees and Sutton Grange. The Lightwater Valley theme park is also in the parish.

The parish is bounded on the north and east by the River Ure, and on the south by the city of Ripon.

North Stainley with Sleningford was historically a township in the ancient parish of Ripon in the West Riding of Yorkshire. It became a civil parish in 1866. It was transferred to North Yorkshire in 1974. In 1988 the parish absorbed the small civil parish of Sutton Grange. From 1974 to 2023 it was part of the Borough of Harrogate, it is now administered by the unitary North Yorkshire Council.

== See also ==
- Listed buildings in North Stainley with Sleningford
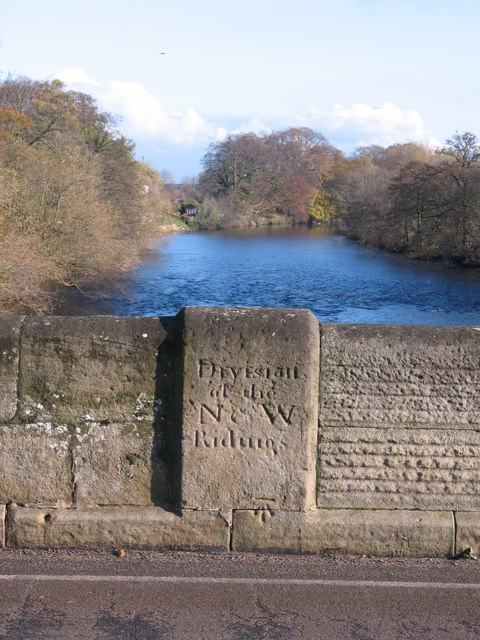
The bridge over the Ure at West Tanfield bears an inscription to mark the boundary between the West and North Ridings of Yorkshire.

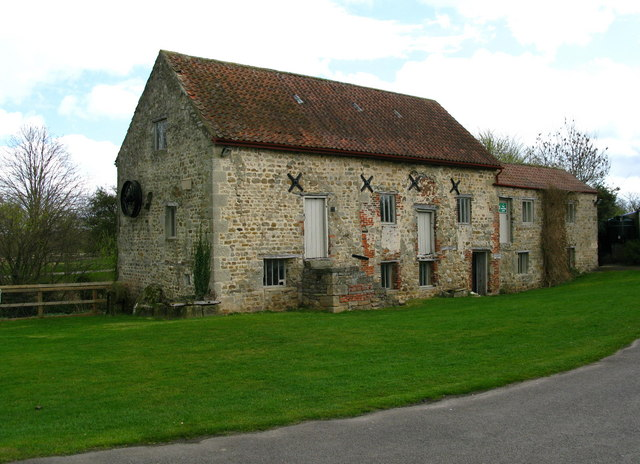
Sleningford Water Mill on the banks of the River Ure downstream from West Tanfield
