= Listed buildings in North Stainley with Sleningford =

North Stainley with Sleningford is a civil parish in the county of North Yorkshire, England. It contains 23 listed buildings that are recorded in the National Heritage List for England. Of these, two are listed at Grade II*, the middle of the three grades, and the others are at Grade II, the lowest grade. The parish contains the village of North Stainley, smaller settlements including Sutton Grange, and the surrounding countryside. Most of the listed buildings consist of country houses, smaller houses and cottages, and associated structures. The others include a farmhouse, farm buildings, a bridge, a watermill, a well cover, and a school with associated structures.

== Key ==
| Grade | Criteria |
|---|---|
| II* | Particularly important buildings of more than special interest |
| II | Buildings of national importance and special interest |

== Buildings ==
| Name and location | Photograph | Date | Notes | Grade |
|---|---|---|---|---|
| Middle Parks Farmhouse; 54.17071°N 1.53901°W | | 14th or 15th century | The farmhouse has a timber framed core, it has been encased in limestone and red brick, and has hipped Westmorland slate roofs. There are two storeys and an L-shaped plan, each range with three bays. The right end bay of the south front has quoins, the lower floor is in limestone and the upper floor in red brick. The lower floor contains a three-light mullioned window with round-headed lights, and on the upper floor is a three-light mullioned window, the lights with flat heads, and both with hood moulds. Elsewhere, the windows are sashes, and inside there is substantial remaining timber framing. | II* |
| Barn, Sutton Grange; 54.16144°N 1.56657°W | — | 16th century (probable) | The barn, later converted for residential use, has a timber framed core, it is encased in split cobbles with limestone quoins, and has a pantile roof with eaves courses of stone slates. The barn is aisled and has five bays. It contains doorways, windows and blocked vents, and at the rear is a wheelhouse. | II |
| Stainley Hall; 54.18368°N 1.56155°W | — | 1715 | A country house in brick on a stone plinth, rendered at the rear, with stone dressings, quoins, an eaves cornice, and a hipped stone slate roof. There are three storeys and five bays. The central doorway has rusticated columns, and an initialled and dated pediment. The windows are sashes with eared architraves, those on the lower two floors also with keystones. At the rear is a re-set doorway with an alternate quoined surround and a five-part lintel, and a bay window to the right. | II* |
| Sleningford Park; 54.19262°N 1.57921°W | — | Early 18th century | A country house in stone, with gritstone dressings, quoins, a sill band, a moulded eaves cornice, and hipped blue slate roofs with some tiles. The main block has three storeys, and five bays, a two-storey three-bay wing to the right, and a single-storey block further to the right. To the left is a single-storey three-bay wing, and a conservatory beyond. The central doorway has rusticated pilasters, a lintel with a five-part keystone and a pediment. The windows are sashes in architraves, and at the rear is a doorway with a Gibbs surround. | II |
| Tanfield Bridge; 54.20363°N 1.58811°W | | 1734 | The bridge carries the A6108 road over the River Ure. It is in stone, rusticated and with a band on the east side, and consists of three segmental arches with voussoirs and hood moulds. There are triangular cutwaters rising to pilasters, a parapet with flat copings, and round end piers with semi-spherical caps. | II |
| Sleningford Grange; 54.19261°N 1.56473°W | — | Mid-18th century | A country house in stone and cobble, with an eaves band, and hipped stone slate roofs. There are two storeys, a front range of three bays, and a rear wing linking to a parallel rear range. In the centre is a doorway with attached columns, a fanlight, an entablature and a dentilled cornice, flanked by canted bay windows. Above the doorway is a sash window flanked by Venetian windows, all with architraves, imposts and keystones. On the wing is a portico with Doric columns. | II |
| Barn south of Sleningford Park; 54.19073°N 1.57970°W | — | 18th century | The barn is in cobbles with rusticated quoins, and a hipped pantile roof with an eaves course of stone slates. There are two storeys and three bays. In the centre is a doorway with a Diocletian window above, and on the upper floor are three square openings, one enlarged to form a loading door. | II |
| Dovecote southwest of Sleningford Park; 54.19035°N 1.58094°W | — | 18th century | The dovecote, later used for other purposes, is in stone and cobbles, with rusticated quoins, and a pyramidal pantile roof with three eaves courses of stone slates. There are two storeys, a square plan, and one bay. In the south front is a wide entrance with a square opening above, and the other sides have small square openings. | II |
| Stables, Stainley Hall; 54.18441°N 1.56066°W | — | Mid-18th century | The former stables are in cobbles, with gritstone dressings, quoins, and a purple slate roof. There are two storeys and three bays, the middle bay projecting slightly under a gable. This contains a carriage arch with a quoined surround, above which is a sash window and three tiers of pigeon holes in a triangular pattern. The outer bays contain doorways and sash windows, in the left return is a circular window, and on the right return are external steps and a circular window above. | II |
| Stables, Sleningford Park; 54.19146°N 1.58098°W | — | Mid to late 18th century | The stables, later converted for other uses, are in stone, with rusticated quoins, and hipped stone slate roofs, and form four ranges round a courtyard. The northeast front has two storeys and three bays, and a moulded eaves cornice. The middle bay projects under a pediment and contains a round-arched carriage entrance flanked by Diocletian windows, with impost bands and architraves, and above are sash windows in architraves. | II |
| Friars Hurst; 54.18775°N 1.57857°W | — | Late 18th century | The house is in rendered stone, with rusticated quoins, and a hipped purple slate roof. There are two storeys, three bays, and a rear range. The central doorway has a rusticated quoined surround and a tripartite keystone. The windows are sashes with incised lintels. | II |
| Sleningford Mill; 54.20000°N 1.57166°W | | Late 18th century (probable) | The watermill is in stone, cobbles and brick, with quoins and a pantile roof. There are two storeys and three bays, a two-storey two-bay addition to the right, and a single-story wheelhouse at the rear. On the front are two doorways, the left approached by steps, windows, and a loading door. | II |
| Gate piers and gates, Stainley Hall; 54.18448°N 1.56053°W | | Late 18th century | The gate piers flanking the entrance to the drive are in rusticated stone, and are about 2.5 metres (8 ft 2 in) tall. Each pier has a cornice above an inscription, and a banded ball and cushion finial. The gates are in wrought iron and have a ramped top with a scroll motif and the initial "S". | II |
| Well cover opposite gates to Old Sleningford Hall; 54.18511°N 1.59416°W | | Late 18th to early 19th century | The well cover is in gritstone, and has a rectangular plan with sides of about 1 metre (3 ft 3 in) and 1.5 metres (4 ft 11 in). It has plain jambs and a lintel, a moulded cornice, and a pyramidal roof. The northeast side is open. | II |
| Old Sleningford Hall and wall 54.18606°N 1.59564°W | | Early 19th century | A country house in stone, with a floor band, a sill band, and hipped Westmorland slate roofs. There are two storeys, a central block of five bays, the middle three bays projecting under a triangular pediment with decoration in the tympanum, and flanking lower two-bay wings, the outer bays projecting slightly. The central doorway is flanked by paired Tuscan columns with an entablature and a cornice, above which is a projecting tripartite panel. The windows are sashes, the window above the doorway with an eared architrave. To the left is a garden wall in red brick with stone coping and ball finials. | II |
| Gates, gate piers, walls and railings, Old Sleningford Hall; 54.18525°N 1.59421°W | | Early 19th century | The gate piers flanking the entrance to the drive are in stone and about 3 metres (9.8 ft) tall. Each pier has an attached column on the south face, a moulded cornice, and a banded ball and cushion finial. The gates are in wrought iron, about 1.5 metres (4 ft 11 in) tall, with scrolled panels and spearhead finials. The flanking stone walls are curved and ramped, about 6 metres (20 ft) long, with flat coping and railings, and end in piers about 1.5 metres (4 ft 11 in) tall, with pyramidal caps. | II |
| Stables, Old Sleningford Hall; 54.18628°N 1.59482°W | — | Early 19th century | The former stables are in stone and brick with stone slate roofs. They consist of two parallel ranges on two sides of a courtyard, the east and west sides enclosed by walls. Each range has two storeys and a taller single-bay tower at the east end. The towers are square, with a circular window in each floor, floor bands, and a pyramidal roof with a lantern and weathervane. The left tower has a dated clock in a former pigeon loft. The west wall contains a doorway, and the east wall, forming the entrance, has a central gateway flanked by square piers with pyramidal caps. Inside the courtyard are stable doors, sash windows and carriage doors. | II |
| Gate piers, and gates and railings southeast of Sleningford Park; 54.19052°N 1.57512°W | | Early 19th century | Flanking the entrance to the drive are two pairs of stone gate piers about 2 metres (6 ft 7 in) tall, each having an entablature with paterae, and a shallow pyramidal cap. The gates are in wrought iron and have spearhead finials, and are decorated with semicircles and scrolls. Between the inner and outer piers are wrought iron railings on low stone walls. | II |
| Gazebo; 54.18499°N 1.56105°W | | Early to mid-19th century | The gazebo is in limestone and cobbles, and has a tall conical roof in sheet metal with a wooden finial. It has a circular plan and one storey, and is built into a garden wall. The building contains a doorway and small square windows. | II |
| Spring Hill School; 54.15187°N 1.53970°W | — | 1841 | Originally a bishop's palace for the Bishop of Ripon, with a chapel added in 1847, and later converted into a school, it is in stone with a Welsh slate roof. There are two storeys, a main range with seven bays, a recessed three-bay service wing, and a chapel at right angles. In the main range is a two-storey porch with diagonal buttresses, shields and heraldic beasts, and mullioned windows with hood moulds. Above is an embattled parapet with small gables. The chapel has four bays, and contains windows with Perpendicular tracery, buttresses, gargoyles and an embattled parapet. | II |
| Lodge to Spring Hill School; 54.15232°N 1.53304°W | — | c. 1841 | The lodge is in limestone with quoins and a stone slate roof. It consists of a two-storey gabled bay, with a single-storey entrance bay to the right. The lodge has a shallow gabled porch, with a hood mould over the doorway, a bay window and a two-light window above. | II |
| Gate piers and wall, Lodge to Spring Hill School; 54.15235°N 1.53278°W | — | c. 1841 | The gate piers flanking the entrance to the drive and the walls are in limestone. The piers are about 2 metres (6 ft 7 in) tall and have ball finials. The walls are curved, with ridged coping, and contain a central pier and end piers, all with shallow pyramidal caps. | II |
| Stables and coach house, Spring Hill School; 54.15223°N 1.54014°W | — | c. 1841 | The building is in limestone with Welsh slate roofs, forming three ranges round a courtyard. The stable block on the west side has two storeys and three bays, the south range was probably a wash house, the north range was the coach house, and the east side is enclosed by a wall. In the centre of the west range is an arch containing a door, flanked by mullioned windows, above are single-light windows under gables, and on the roof is a lantern with a clock, a spire and a weathervane. The coach house has four entrances, and the enclosing wall has ridged coping and gate piers with stepped pyramidal caps. | II |
