= Sutton Grange, North Yorkshire =

Village and former civil parish in North Yorkshire, England

Coordinates: 54.1625°N 1.5665°W

Sutton Grange
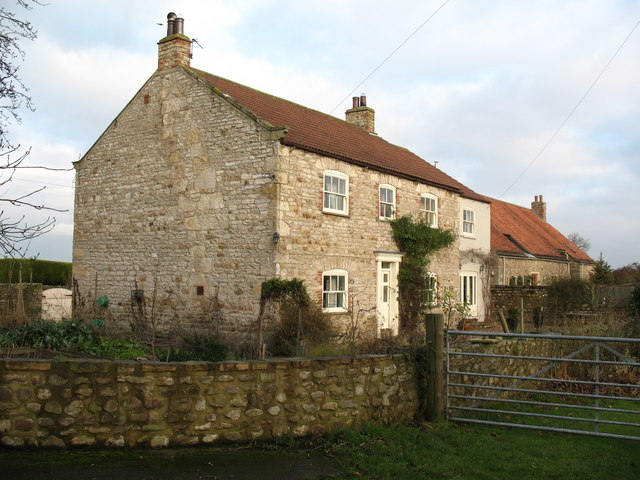
- Farmhouse in Sutton Grange

- Location within North Yorkshire
- OS grid reference: SE284740
- Civil parish: North Stainley with Sleningford
- Unitary authority: North Yorkshire
- Ceremonial county: North Yorkshire
- Region: Yorkshire and the Humber
- Country: England
- Sovereign state: United Kingdom
- Post town: Ripon
- Postcode district: HG4
- Police: North Yorkshire
- Fire: North Yorkshire
- Ambulance: Yorkshire

Sutton Grange is a hamlet in the civil parish of North Stainley with Sleningford, in North Yorkshire, England, 2 miles (3 km) north west of Ripon.

== History ==
The name "Sutton" means 'South farm/settlement'. Sutton Grange was recorded in the Domesday Book as Sudton/Sudtunen. It was historically a township in the parish of Ripon in the West Riding of Yorkshire, and became a separate civil parish in 1866. In 1971 the parish had a population of 40. Between 1974 and 2023 it was part of the Harrogate district in North Yorkshire, and on 1 April 1988 it was absorbed into the civil parish of North Stainley with Sleningford.

Since 2023 it is administered by the unitary North Yorkshire Council.

Sutton Grange was the site of a grange of Fountains Abbey. Earthworks surrounding an enclosure known as Hall Garth represent the only visible remains of the grange.

== See also ==
- Listed buildings in North Stainley with Sleningford
