= Louis Hayes Petit =

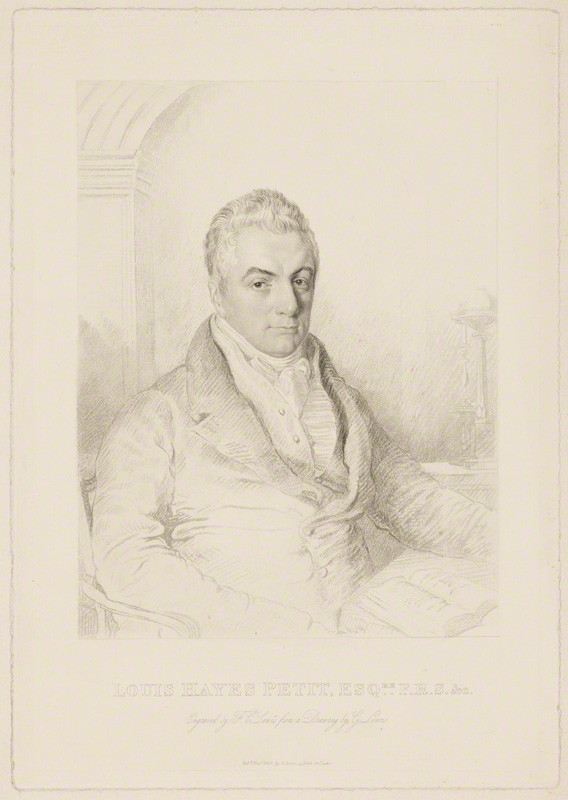
- Louis Hayes Petit, 1822 engraving
- Born: 9 November 1774
- Died: 13 November 1849 (aged 75)
- Resting place: Highgate Cemetery

Louis Hayes Petit (9 November 1774 – 13 November 1849) was an English barrister and politician.

== Life ==
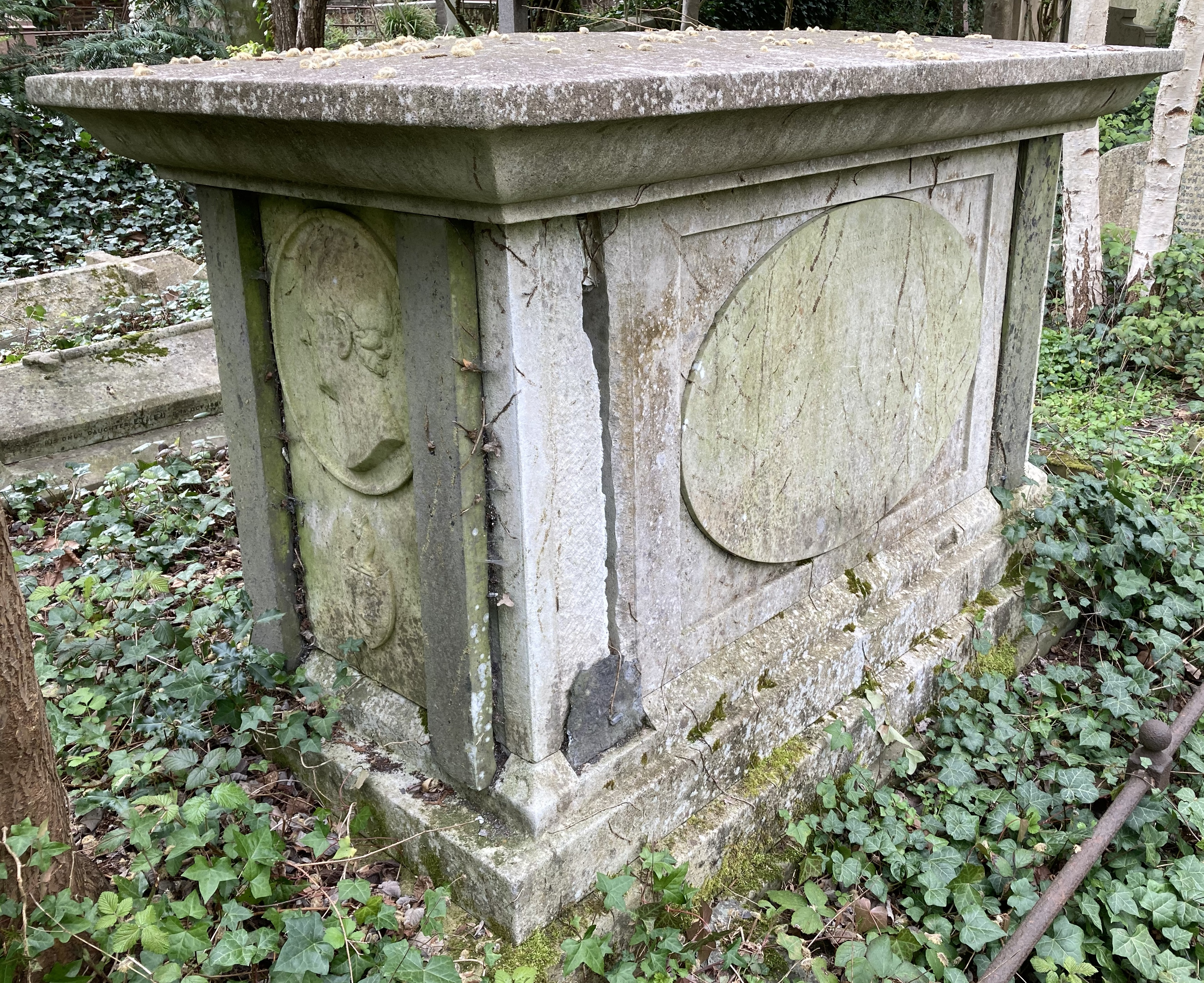
Grave of Louis Hayes Petit in Highgate Cemetery

He was a younger son of the physician John Lewis Petit, who died in 1780, and was educated at Newcombe's School. Prepared for university by Samuel Parlby, he entered Queens' College, Cambridge, graduating B.A. in 1796, M.A, in 1799. He was called to the bar at Lincoln's Inn in 1801, and practised as a barrister to 1821.

Petit was elected Member of Parliament for Ripon in 1827, through a family connection with Lancelot Shadwell, who managed the constituency for the patron Elizabeth Sophia Lawrence. He support parliamentary reform, and was returned again in 1831. He did not stand the 1832 election for the reformed parliament, having lost Elizabeth Lawrence's support.

Petit became a fellow of the Society of Antiquaries of London, in 1803, and of the Royal Society in 1807. He was a fellow also of the Linnaean Society, Geological Society and Royal Astronomical Society. His heir was John Louis Petit.

He died on 13 November 1849 and is buried on the western side of Highgate Cemetery.
