= North Stainley =

Village and civil parish in North Yorkshire, England

Coordinates: 54°11′17″N 1°33′42″W

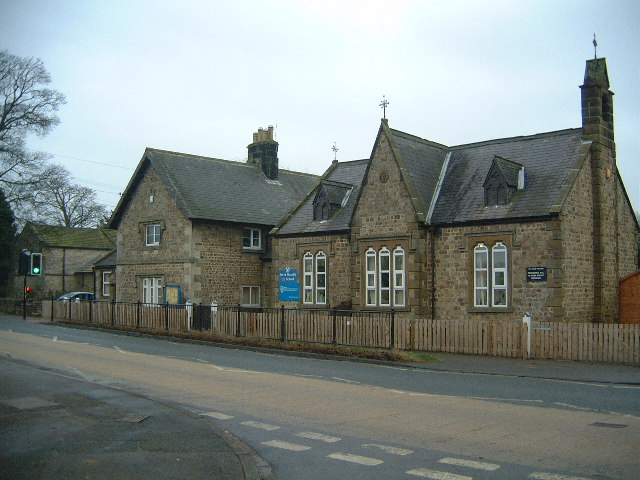
- The Church of England primary school in North Stainley

- Location within North Yorkshire
- Population: 737 (2011 Census)
- OS grid reference: SE286768
- Civil parish: North Stainley with Sleningford
- Unitary authority: North Yorkshire
- Ceremonial county: North Yorkshire
- Region: Yorkshire and the Humber
- Country: England
- Sovereign state: United Kingdom
- Post town: RIPON
- Postcode district: HG4
- Police: North Yorkshire
- Fire: North Yorkshire
- Ambulance: Yorkshire
- UK Parliament: Skipton and Ripon

North Stainley is a village in the county of North Yorkshire, England 4 miles (6.4 km) north of Ripon. Historically part of the West Riding of Yorkshire, it is the closest settlement to the theme park Lightwater Valley which is 0.62 miles (1 km) to the south.

== History ==
North Stainley is derived jointly from Old English and Old Norse and means a stone clearing. The village is mentioned in the Domesday Book with 15 ploughlands and belonging to the Archbishop of York. The name of the village derives from the Old English of Stān lēah, which means a stone wood or clearing. North Stainley is on the south bank of the River Ure, and was in the West Riding of Yorkshire until 1974, when it was moved into North Yorkshire. It was formerly in the wapentake of Claro, and the Liberty of Ripon. From 1974 to 2023 it was part of the Borough of Harrogate, it is now administered by the unitary North Yorkshire Council.

The population of the parish in the 2001 census was 604, rising to 737 at the 2011 Census. In 2015, North Yorkshire County Council estimated the population of the parish to be 760. The parish includes the hamlet of Sleningford.

The village is cut through by the A6108 road between Ripon and Leyburn. It has a school, North Stainley Church of England Primary School, which is rated as being Requires Improvement by Ofsted and a church, St Mary the Virgin. The church was built in 1840 by the Staveley family, who owned the manor and built the Manor House in the 16th century. The pub in the village is called The Staveley Arms.

Since 1983, the parish has been part of the Skipton and Ripon Parliamentary constituency.

== See also ==
- Listed buildings in North Stainley with Sleningford
