= Wedding of Prince Andrew and Sarah Ferguson =

1986 British royal wedding

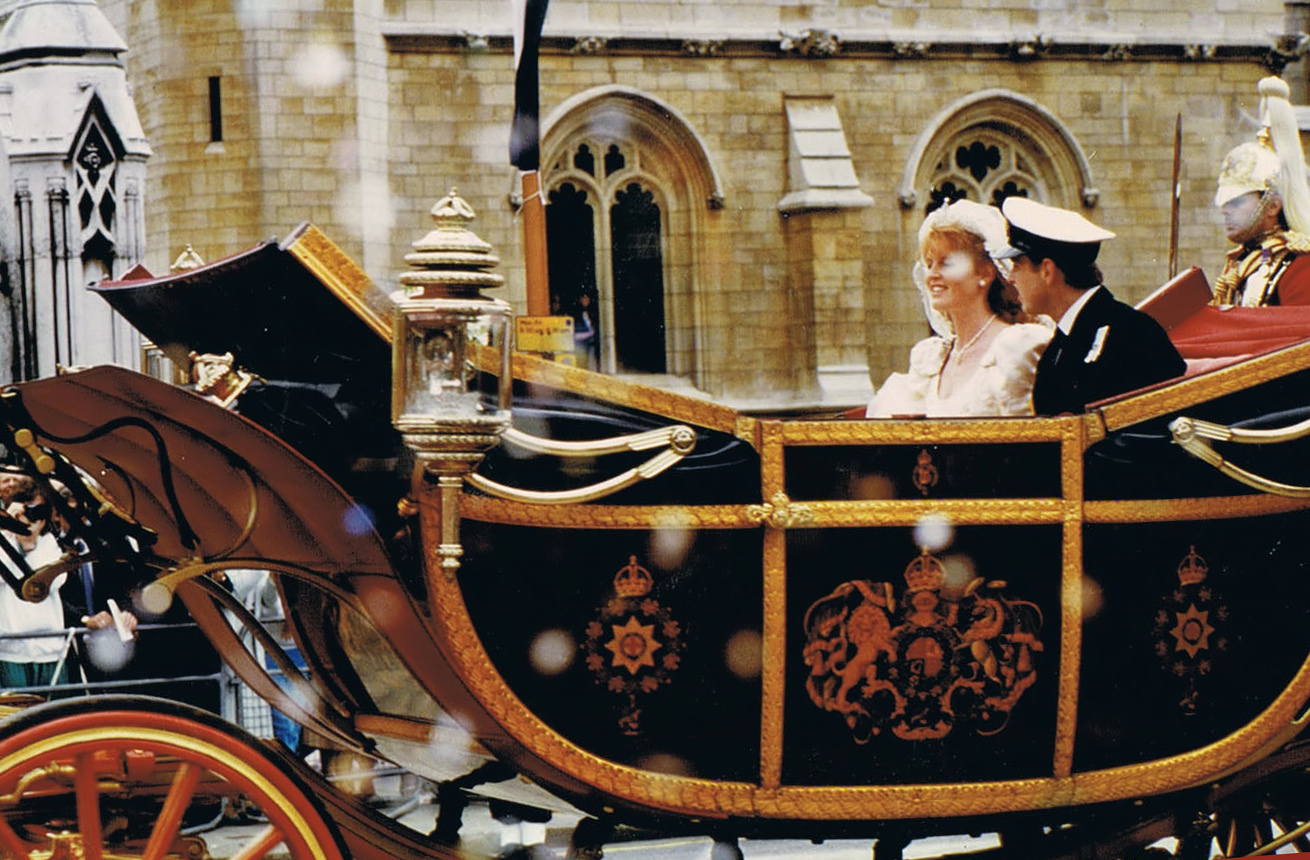
- The Duke and Duchess of York on their wedding day
- Date: 23 July 1986; 40 years ago
- Location: Westminster Abbey, London, England
- Participants: Prince Andrew; Sarah Ferguson

The wedding of Prince Andrew and Sarah Ferguson took place on Wednesday, 23 July 1986, at Westminster Abbey in London. The ceremony was attended by approximately 2,000 guests, including members of the British royal family, foreign royalty, political dignitaries, and the bride's family, and was watched by an estimated 500 million viewers worldwide. Andrew was created Duke of York on the morning of the ceremony, and Sarah became Her Royal Highness The Duchess of York upon marriage. The couple had two daughters before separating in 1992 and divorcing in 1996.

== Courtship and engagement ==
Prince Andrew, the third child and second son of Queen Elizabeth II and Prince Philip, Duke of Edinburgh, and Sarah Ferguson, the daughter of Major Ronald Ferguson and his first wife Susan Wright, first met when they were children, but had not been romantically involved until they met again at a party at Floors Castle in 1985. They began their relationship that very same year, after a party held at Windsor Castle in honour of the Royal Ascot races. Diana, Princess of Wales, Andrew's sister-in-law, played a hand in matchmaking the couple, and the two women later formed a strong friendship.

Andrew proposed to Sarah on 19 February 1986, his twenty-sixth birthday. Their engagement was announced on 17 March 1986. Andrew presented Sarah with a Garrard engagement ring made from sketches he had drawn. The ring has a Burma ruby surrounded by ten drop-diamonds. The mounting was eighteen-carat white and yellow gold. Andrew's stag night was held at Aubrey House in Holland Park. It was attended by Prince Charles, Billy Connolly, David Frost and Elton John.

== Wedding ceremony ==
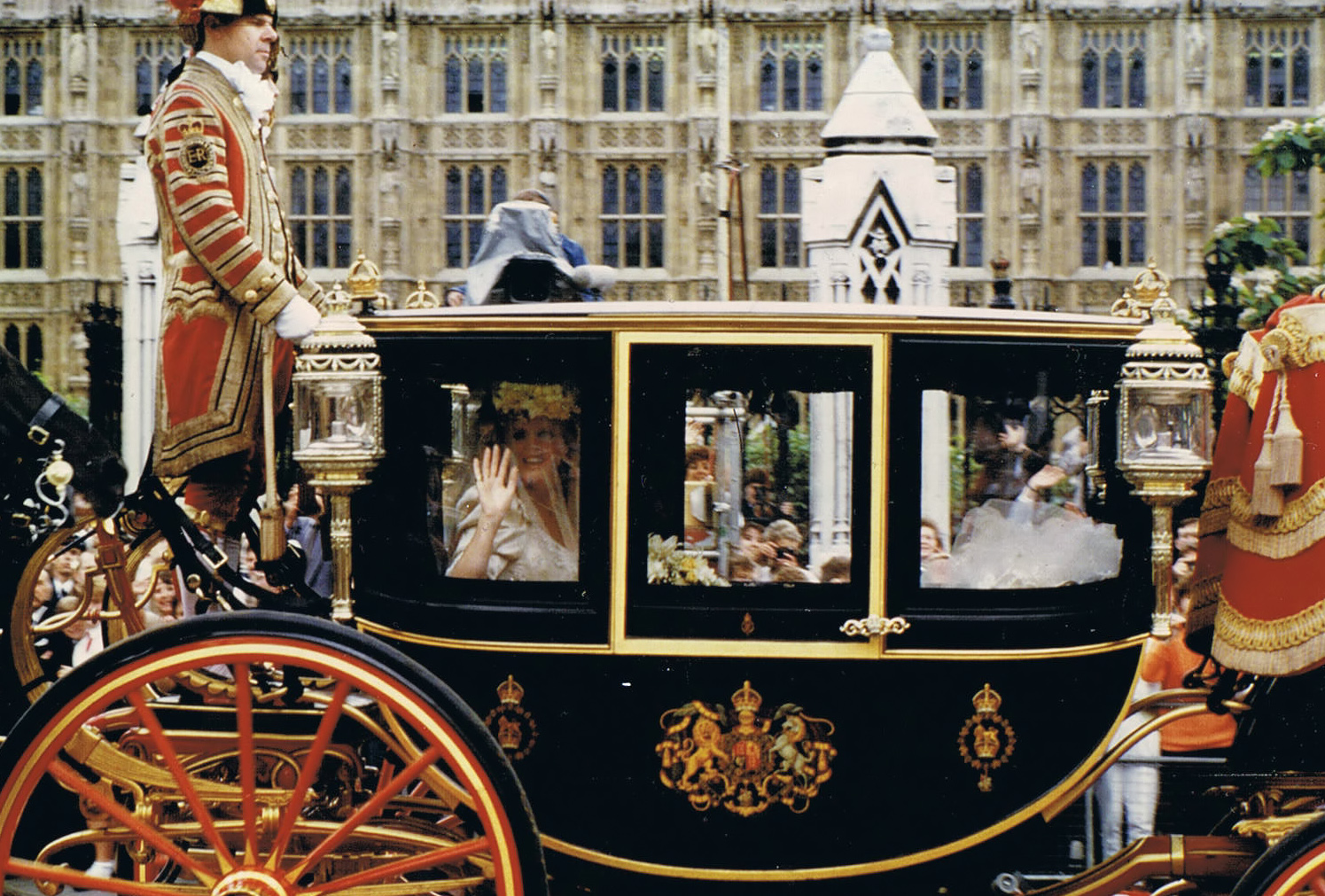
Sarah Ferguson in the Glass coach before the wedding

Combined coat of arms of Andrew and Sarah, the Duke and Duchess of York

External videos
- Royal Wedding of Prince Andrew and Sarah Ferguson (1986) (external video)

Four months after announcing their engagement, Andrew and Sarah married on 23 July 1986, at Westminster Abbey in London. The Lord Chamberlain's office was responsible for organising the ceremony and guest list, while the royal household was left in charge of the reception. Sarah made her way with her father Ronald from Clarence House in the Glass Coach, arriving at the church at 11:30. The Archbishop of Canterbury Robert Runcie conducted the 45-minute wedding ceremony. As the couple exchanged vows, Sarah mistakenly repeated Andrew's middle name, Christian; five years earlier, Diana, Princess of Wales, made a similar mistake by reversing the order of Prince Charles's names. Unlike the wedding of Prince Charles and Lady Diana, Sarah chose to say the word "obey" in her vow "to love, cherish and to obey." In keeping with tradition, the wedding ring was crafted from Welsh gold. The tradition of using Welsh gold within the wedding rings of the royal family dates back to 1923.

Both Andrew's brothers participated in the wedding ceremony; Prince Edward was his best man, and Prince Charles read a lesson during the service. The bridesmaids and page boys included Princess Anne's children Peter and Zara Phillips, and Prince Charles's eldest son Prince William. Members of foreign royal families, as well as the U.S. First Lady Nancy Reagan were among the guests. The ceremony featured many ceremonial aspects, including use of the state carriages and roles for the Household Cavalry.

Andrew and Sarah left Westminster Abbey for Buckingham Palace in an open-top 1902 State Landau. Around 100,000 people gathered to witness the Andrew and Sarah's first kiss as man and wife on the balcony of the palace. After a traditional wedding breakfast for 120 guests at Buckingham Palace, the married couple and some 300 guests moved to a party at Claridge's hotel.

The 5½-foot-tall (168 cm) "marzipan and rum-soaked" wedding cake was supplied by the Royal Navy supply school HMS Raleigh. They made two identical cakes in case one was damaged. 100 cakes were offered at a competition held by the palace, and subsequently they were all donated to hospices. 30,000 flowers were used to decorate the abbey, all of which were eventually also donated to hospices. Albert Mackenzie Watson was chosen by Andrew to take the wedding portraits.

=== Clothing ===
Andrew was dressed in a ceremonial attire of a naval lieutenant, while Sarah wore an ivory-silk wedding dress designed by Lindka Cierach, which had a five metres long (17 feet) train, and six metre long (20 feet) veil. Sarah, in her own words, "lost 26 pounds to fit into" the dress. Her S-shaped bouquet featured "gardenias, cream lilies, yellow roses, lilies of the valley and a sprig of myrtle." Sarah wore a coronet of gardenias for the occasion which was placed atop a diamond tiara that was given to her by the Queen as part of a Garrard demi-parure set.

=== Best man, bridesmaids and page boys ===
Best man

- The Prince Edward, age 22, younger brother of the groom.

Bridesmaids and page boys:

- Lady Rosanagh Innes-Ker, age 7, the daughter of Guy Innes-Ker, 10th Duke of Roxburghe
- Alice Ferguson, age 6, younger half-sister of the bride.
- Laura Fellowes, age 6, the daughter of Diana's sister Lady Jane Fellowes
- Zara Phillips age 5, niece of the groom
- Andrew Ferguson, age 8, half-brother of the bride
- Peter Phillips age 8, nephew of the groom
- Seamus Luedecke, age 5, nephew of the bride
- Prince William of Wales age 4, nephew of the groom

=== Musical selection ===
Organist and choir director: Simon Preston

- Laudate Dominum (from Vesperae solennes de confessore) by W. A. Mozart, sung by soprano Felicity Lott
- Exsultate, Jubilate by W. A. Mozart, sung by Arleen Auger
- Alleluja from motet Exsultate, Jubilate, sung by Arleen Auger
- Crown Imperial by William Walton

== Titles upon marriage ==
On the day of the wedding, the Queen granted Andrew the titles of Duke of York, Earl of Inverness and Baron Killyleagh—the first two titles were previously held by his maternal great-grandfather King George V, and grandfather King George VI. By marriage, Sarah became Her Royal Highness The Duchess of York, Countess of Inverness and Baroness Killyleagh, also attaining the rank of Princess of the United Kingdom. Sarah ceased to be Duchess of York when she and Andrew divorced; she was thereafter known by the courtesy title of Sarah, Duchess of York. Andrew ceased using the title in 2025 amidst controversy surrounding his associations with Jeffrey Epstein and is now known as Andrew Mountbatten-Windsor; Sarah also ceased using her courtesy title and reverted to her maiden name.

== Honeymoon ==
Andrew and Sarah made their way to Heathrow Airport in an open carriage, with a paper mache satellite dish and sign attached reading "Phone Home" put there as a practical joke by Prince Edward. The Princess of Wales and Viscount Linley, Princess Margaret's son, placed a king-sized teddy bear inside the coach. The couple boarded a royal jet, emblazoned with "Just Married" on the rear door, for the Azores Islands, and then spent their 5-day honeymoon aboard the royal yacht Britannia in the Atlantic.

== Public reception ==
The BBC reported that 500 million television viewers tuned in to watch the wedding of Andrew and Sarah worldwide. An estimated crowd of 100,000 gathered to see the couple's first public kiss as man and wife on the balcony of Buckingham Palace. The wedding ceremony was positively received by the public. The media frenzy caused by the wedding was called "Fergie Fever" by The New York Times. A number of ceremonies and parties were held at different places by the public to celebrate the occasion across the United Kingdom. The wedding was widely broadcast on television and radio in many countries, and news channels covered the ceremony in different languages.

== Guest list ==
Notable guests in attendance included:

=== Relatives of the groom ===
==== House of Windsor ====
- The Queen and the Duke of Edinburgh, the groom's parents
  - The Prince and Princess of Wales, the groom's brother and sister-in-law
    - Prince William of Wales, the groom's nephew (pageboy)
    - Prince Harry of Wales, the groom's nephew
  - The Princess Anne, Mrs Mark Phillips and Captain Mark Phillips, the groom's sister and brother-in-law
    - Peter Phillips, the groom's nephew (pageboy)
    - Zara Phillips, the groom's niece (bridesmaid)
  - The Prince Edward, the groom's brother (best man)
- Queen Elizabeth the Queen Mother, the groom's maternal grandmother
  - The Princess Margaret, Countess of Snowdon, the groom's maternal aunt
    - Viscount Linley, the groom's first cousin
    - Lady Sarah Armstrong-Jones, the groom's first cousin
- Princess Alice, Duchess of Gloucester, the groom's maternal great-aunt by marriage (also the bride’s first cousin twice removed)
  - The Duke and Duchess of Gloucester, the groom's first cousin, once removed, (also the bride’s second cousin once removed) and his wife
    - Earl of Ulster, the groom's second cousin (also the bride’s third cousin)
    - Lady Davina Windsor, the groom's second cousin (also the bride’s third cousin)
    - Lady Rose Windsor, the groom's second cousin (also the bride’s third cousin)
- The Duke and Duchess of Kent, the groom's first cousin, once removed, and his wife
  - Earl of St Andrews, the groom's second cousin
  - Lady Helen Windsor, the groom's second cousin
- Princess Alexandra, The Hon. Mrs Angus Ogilvy and The Hon. Angus Ogilvy, the groom's first cousin, once removed, and her husband
  - James Ogilvy, the groom's second cousin
  - Marina Ogilvy, the groom's second cousin
- Prince and Princess Michael of Kent, the groom's first cousin, once removed, and his wife
  - Lord Frederick Windsor, the groom's second cousin
  - Lady Gabriella Windsor, the groom's second cousin

==== Other descendants of George III ====
- Lady Mary Whitley, the groom's second cousin, once removed
- The Lady Saltoun, wife of the groom's second cousin, twice removed

==== Mountbatten family ====
- The Dowager Marchioness of Milford Haven, widow of the groom's first cousin, once removed
  - The Marquess of Milford Haven, the groom's second cousin
  - Lord Ivar Mountbatten, the groom's second cousin
- The Countess Mountbatten of Burma and The Lord Brabourne, the groom's first cousin, once removed, and her husband
  - Lord and Lady Romsey, the groom's second cousin and his wife
  - The Hon. Michael-John Knatchbull, the groom's second cousin, and his wife
  - Baroness and Baron Hubert du Breuil, the groom's second cousin and her husband
  - Lady Amanda Knatchbull, the groom's second cousin
  - The Hon. Philip Knatchbull, the groom's second cousin
  - The Hon. Timothy Knatchbull, the groom's second cousin
- Lady Pamela and David Hicks, the groom's first cousin, once removed and her husband
  - Ashley Hicks, the groom's second cousin
  - India Hicks, the groom's second cousin

==== Bowes-Lyon family ====
- The Earl and Countess of Strathmore and Kinghorne, the groom's first cousin, once removed and his wife
- Lady Rose Anson, the groom's second cousin, twice removed (bridesmaid)

=== Relatives of the bride ===
==== Ferguson family ====
- Ronald and Susan Ferguson, the bride's father and stepmother
  - Andrew Ferguson, the bride's paternal half-brother
  - Alice Ferguson, the bride's paternal half-sister
- Susan and Héctor Barrantes, the bride's mother and stepfather
  - Mrs and Mr William Alez Makim, the bride's sister and her husband
    - Seamus Makim, the bride's nephew
- Lady Elmhirst, the bride's paternal grandmother

==== Wright family ====
- The Hon. Mrs FitzHerbert Wright, the bride's maternal grandmother
  - Mrs and Mr Julian Salmond, the bride's maternal aunt and uncle
  - The Lady and Lord Loch, the bride's maternal aunt and uncle
  - Major Bryan Wright, the bride's maternal uncle

=== Foreign royalty ===
==== Members of reigning royal families ====
- The Crown Princess of Norway, wife of the groom's second cousin, once removed (representing the King of Norway)
- Princess Margaretha, Mrs Ambler and John Ambler, the groom's third cousin once removed, and her husband (representing the King of Sweden)
- Prince Georg of Denmark, the groom's second cousin, once removed (representing the Queen of Denmark)
- The Prince of Asturias, the groom's second cousin, once removed (representing the King of Spain)
  - Infanta Elena of Spain, the groom's second cousin, once removed
  - Infanta Cristina of Spain, the groom's second cousin, once removed
- Prince Philippe of Belgium, the groom's third cousin, once removed (representing the King of the Belgians)
- The Hereditary Grand Duke of Luxembourg, the groom's third cousin, once removed (representing the Grand Duke of Luxembourg)
- The Prince Hiro (representing the Emperor of Japan)
- The Hereditary Prince of Monaco, the groom's fifth cousin once removed (representing the Prince of Monaco)

==== Members of non-reigning royal families ====
- King Constantine II and Queen Anne-Marie of the Hellenes, the groom's second cousin and his wife, the groom's third cousin once removed
  - Crown Prince Pavlos of Greece, the groom's second cousin, once removed
  - Prince Nikolaos of Greece and Denmark, the groom's second cousin, once removed
  - Princess Alexia of Greece and Denmark, the groom's second cousin, once removed
- Crown Prince Alexander and Crown Princess Katherine of Yugoslavia, the groom's second cousin, once removed, and his wife
- The Margrave and Margravine of Baden, the groom's first cousin and his wife
  - Princess Marie Louise of Baden, the groom's first cousin, once removed
- Princess Margarita of Baden, the groom's first cousin
  - Prince Nikola of Yugoslavia, the groom's first cousin, once removed
  - Princess Katarina of Yugoslavia, the groom's first cousin once removed
- Prince and Princess George William of Hanover, the groom's paternal uncle and aunt
  - Prince and Princess Georg of Hanover, the groom's first cousin and his wife
  - Prince and Princess Karl of Hesse, the groom's first cousin and his wife
    - Prince Christoph of Hesse, the groom's first cousin, once removed
    - Princess Irina of Hesse, the groom's first cousin, once removed
- The Princess of Hesse and by Rhine, widow of the groom's first cousin, twice removed
- The Prince of Hohenlohe-Langenburg, the groom's first cousin
  - Princess Cécile of Hohenlohe-Langenburg, the groom's first cousin, once removed
- Prince and Princess Andreas of Hohenlohe-Langenburg, the groom's first cousin and his wife
- Princess Beatrix of Hohenlohe-Langenburg, the groom's first cousin

=== Religious figures ===
- The Most Rev. Robert Runcie, Archbishop of Canterbury, and Rosalind Runcie
- The Very Rev. Michael Mayne, Dean of Westminster
- The Right Rev. Edward Knapp-Fisher, Archdeacon of Westminster

=== Politicians and diplomats ===
- Nancy Reagan, First Lady of the United States
- Margaret Thatcher, Prime Minister of the United Kingdom

=== Other notable guests ===
- Arleen Auger
- Michael Caine
- Elton John and Renate Blauel
- Estée Lauder
- Felicity Lott
- Simon Preston
- Patrick McNally
- The Duke and Duchess of Roxburghe
  - Lady Rosanagh Innes-Ker
- Lady Jane and Robert Fellowes
  - Laura Fellowes
- The Duke and Duchess of Grafton
- The Dowager Duchess of Abercorn
- Sir William Heseltine

== Aftermath ==
It was reported that Andrew's obligations as a naval helicopter pilot meant that they only saw each other 40 days a year. Sarah received criticism from the media about her weight, contributing to her stress and the couple's estrangement. Andrew and Sarah announced their separation on 19 March 1992, and divorced on 30 May 1996.

After the couple's divorce, Sarah lost the style Her Royal Highness, becoming "Sarah, Duchess of York," and she was no longer a British princess.

On 17 October 2025, following her former husband Andrew's agreement to cease using his peerage titles, it was reported that Sarah would no longer use "Duchess of York" as a courtesy title. On 21 October 2025, she removed references to the title "Duchess of York" from her social media page handles. On 30 October 2025, Andrew's brother, King Charles III, started the "formal process" to remove the former's style, titles, and honours. His name was subsequently removed from the Roll of the Peerage.
