= Neil Williams =

Neil or Neal Williams may refer to:

- Neil Williams (artist) (1934–1988), American painter
- Neil Williams (cricketer) (1962–2006), British cricketer
- Neil Williams (pilot) (1934–1977), Welsh aerobatics pilot
- Neil Williams (water polo) (1918–1998), New Zealand water polo player
- Neal Williams (ecologist), American pollination ecologist
- Neal H. Williams (1870–1956), American physicist
- Neil 'Roberto' Williams (born 1978), British radio presenter
- Neil Wynn Williams (1864–1940), British novelist and writer
