= Lady Jane Dawnay =

British aristocrat and thoroughbred racehorse owner

- Born: Jane Meriel Grosvenor; 8 February 1953 (age 73)
- Spouses: Guy Innes-Ker, 10th Duke of Roxburghe (m. 1977; div. 1990) Edward Dawnay (m. 1996)
- Children: Rosanagh Grimston, Viscountess Grimston; Charles Innes-Ker, 11th Duke of Roxburghe; Lord Edward Innes-Ker
- Parents: Robert Grosvenor, 5th Duke of Westminster (father); The Hon. Viola Lyttelton (mother)

Lady Jane Meriel Dawnay (née Grosvenor; born 8 February 1953), formerly Jane Innes-Ker, Duchess of Roxburghe, is a British aristocrat and thoroughbred racehorse owner.

== Early life ==
Dawnay was born Jane Meriel Grosvenor on 8 February 1953 to Robert Grosvenor and The Honourable Viola Lyttelton. She was raised in Northern Ireland where her father, in line for the dukedom of Westminster, was High Sheriff of Fermanagh. The family resided at Ely Lodge in Blaney, County Fermanagh. Her father became heir presumptive to the dukedom in 1963 and succeeded his brother as 5th Duke of Westminster in 1967. Thus, Jane became Lady Jane Grosvenor. She has two elder siblings: Leonora, Countess of Lichfield, and Gerald, 6th Duke of Westminster.

In 1971, Lady Jane was presented as debutante at the International Debutante Ball at the Waldorf Astoria Hotel in New York City. As a young woman, Dawnay was a rumored girlfriend of Charles, Prince of Wales, later King Charles III.

== Racing ==
Dawnay's racing colours

Dawnay is an owner of thoroughbred racehorces, notable horses who have run in her colours are Cobblers Dream, winner of the 2022 Lanzarote Hurdle and 2022 Martin Pipe Conditional Jockeys' Handicap Hurdle, Croco Bay, winner of the 2019 Johnny Henderson Grand Annual Chase, and Dance Island, winner of the 2010 Mildmay Novices' Chase.

== Marriages and issue ==
Dawnay met her first husband, Guy, 10th Duke of Roxburghe, at a party in Northern Ireland. They were married on 11 September 1977 at St Mary's Church, Eccleston. They had three children:

- Lady Rosanagh Viola Alexandra Innes-Ker (born 16 January 1979), married James Walter, Viscount Grimston, in 2008, has issue
- Charles Robert George, 11th Duke of Roxburghe (born 18 February 1981)
- Lord Edward Arthur Gerald Innes-Ker (born 2 February 1984), married Celia Margaret Brook (born 1987) in 2017

Upon marriage, she became styled as Her Grace The Duchess of Roxburghe. During her first marriage, the Roxburghe's resided at the Duke's ancestral family seat Floors Castle near Kelso in the Scottish Borders. Andrew Mountbatten Windsor is godfather of her younger son Lord Edward and she in turn is godmother of Princess Beatrice. Andrew Mountbatten Windsor proposed to Sarah Ferguson at Floors Castle and the Roxburghe's daughter Lady Rosanagh was a bridesmaid at their wedding in July 1986.

The Duchess sued her husband for divorce in 1990, accusing him of adultery. After their divorce, the Duchess said of her first husband "boys will be boys". She remained popular with the townspeople of Kelso after her divorce.

On 11 June 1996, she married Edward William Dawnay (born 10 February 1950), her second cousin through Hugh, 1st Duke of Westminster. They reside at Hillington Hall near King's Lynn, Norfolk and in Eaton Square, London.
