= Robert Grosvenor, 5th Duke of Westminster =

British soldier and politician (1910–1979)

Lieutenant Colonel His Grace The Duke of Westminster TD JP DL

Lord Lieutenant of Fermanagh
- In office 7 February 1977 – 19 February 1979
- Monarch: Elizabeth II
- Preceded by: Thomas Scott
- Succeeded by: The Dowager Duchess of Westminster

Member of the House of Lords as Duke of Westminster
- In office 25 February 1967 – 19 February 1979
- Preceded by: Gerald Grosvenor (IV)
- Succeeded by: Gerald Grosvenor (VI)

Member of Parliament for Fermanagh and South Tyrone
- In office 2 September 1955 – 25 September 1964
- Preceded by: Philip Clarke
- Succeeded by: Marquess of Hamilton

Personal details
- Born: Robert George Grosvenor; 24 April 1910
- Died: 19 February 1979 (aged 68) Enniskillen, County Fermanagh, Northern Ireland
- Spouse: The Hon. Viola Lyttelton (m. 1946)
- Children: Leonora Anson, Countess of Lichfield; Gerald Grosvenor, 6th Duke of Westminster; Lady Jane Dawnay
- Parent(s): Lord Hugh Grosvenor; Lady Mabel Crichton
- Occupation: British Army officer and politician
- Awards: Efficiency Decoration and clasp (TD)

Military service
- Allegiance: United Kingdom
- Branch/service: British Army
- Years of service: 1938–1960
- Rank: Lieutenant Colonel
- Unit: 11th (City of London) Light Anti-Aircraft Brigade; City of London Yeomanry; North Irish Horse
- Battles/wars: World War II

Lieutenant-Colonel Robert George Grosvenor, 5th Duke of Westminster, TD, JP, DL (24 April 1910 – 19 February 1979), was a British soldier, landowner, businessman and politician. In the 1970s he was the richest man in Britain.

== Background and early life ==
Grosvenor was born Mr. Robert Grosvenor, younger son of Lord Hugh Grosvenor, himself the sixth son and tenth child of the 1st Duke of Westminster by his second wife, the Hon. Katherine Cavendish, daughter of the 2nd Baron Chesham. Grosvenor's mother, Lady Mabel Crichton, was the daughter of the 4th Earl of Erne.

Grosvenor was educated at Eton College, an all-boys public boarding school in Berkshire. He was a member of the school's contingent of the junior division of the Officer Training Corps. He reached the rank of cadet lance corporal.

== Military career ==
On 28 June 1938, Grosvenor was commissioned into the 11th (City of London Yeomanry) Light Anti-Aircraft Brigade, a newly formed Territorial Army unit of the Royal Artillery, as a second lieutenant. He ended World War II as a war substantive major.

On 1 May 1947, he transferred to the reformed City of London Yeomanry (Rough Riders) and was promoted from his pre-war substantive rank of second lieutenant to major with seniority from 24 April 1944. His service number was 76151. He transferred to the North Irish Horse on 1 May 1949. On 11 November 1949, he was awarded the Efficiency Decoration (TD) for long service with the Territorial Army. He was promoted to lieutenant colonel on 15 February 1953. He was awarded a clasp to his Efficiency Decoration on 26 October 1954. On 14 February 1956, he moved from the Active List to the Territorial Army Reserve of Officers. He resigned his commission on 15 April 1960 and was permitted to retain the rank of lieutenant colonel.

== Political career ==
Grosvenor lived in Northern Ireland most of his life at Ely Lodge, Blaney, on an island in the middle of Lough Erne. In 1952 he was appointed High Sheriff of Fermanagh.

In the 1955 general election, he was deemed elected to Parliament as member for Fermanagh & South Tyrone owing to the disqualification of the Sinn Féin winner. Re-elected in his own right in 1959, he retired in 1964, he was succeeded by his cousin, the Marquess of Hamilton. In Parliament he stuck mainly to constituency issues, but was responsible for a bill to help increase adoptions, which became the Adoption Act 1964. He was described in his successor's maiden speech as popular and well-liked.

== Peerage ==
At birth, as a son of the younger son of a peer, Grosvenor was entitled to no title or courtesy title at all. In 1963, his cousin, the 3rd Duke of Westminster, died and Grosvenor's elder brother Gerald became the 4th Duke. At this point, since he was likely to succeed his brother in the peerage, a Royal Warrant of Precedence was issued to allow Grosvenor to adopt the style of Lord Robert Grosvenor. Upon his brother's death in 1967, Robert duly became 5th Duke of Westminster. Although he took his seat in the House of Lords, he never spoke, something surprising in view of his political career. Westminster (as he was now known) was appointed honorary colonel of the North Irish Horse in 1971.

== Personal life ==
On 3 December 1946, he married his second cousin, Hon. Viola Maud Lyttelton, a daughter of the 9th Viscount Cobham. They had three children:

- Lady Leonora Mary Grosvenor (b. 1 February 1949). She married Thomas Patrick Anson, 5th Earl of Lichfield on 8 March 1975 and they were divorced in 1986. They have three children and two grandsons.
- Gerald Cavendish Grosvenor, 6th Duke of Westminster (22 December 1951 – 9 August 2016). He married Natalia Phillips on 7 October 1978. They had four children and six grandchildren.
- Lady Jane Meriel Grosvenor (b. 8 February 1953). She married Guy David Innes-Ker, 10th Duke of Roxburghe on 10 September 1977 and they were divorced in 1990. They have three children and seven grandchildren. Lady Jane was presented to high society as a debutante at the prestigious International Debutante Ball at the Waldorf-Astoria Hotel in New York City in 1971.

== Death and legacy ==
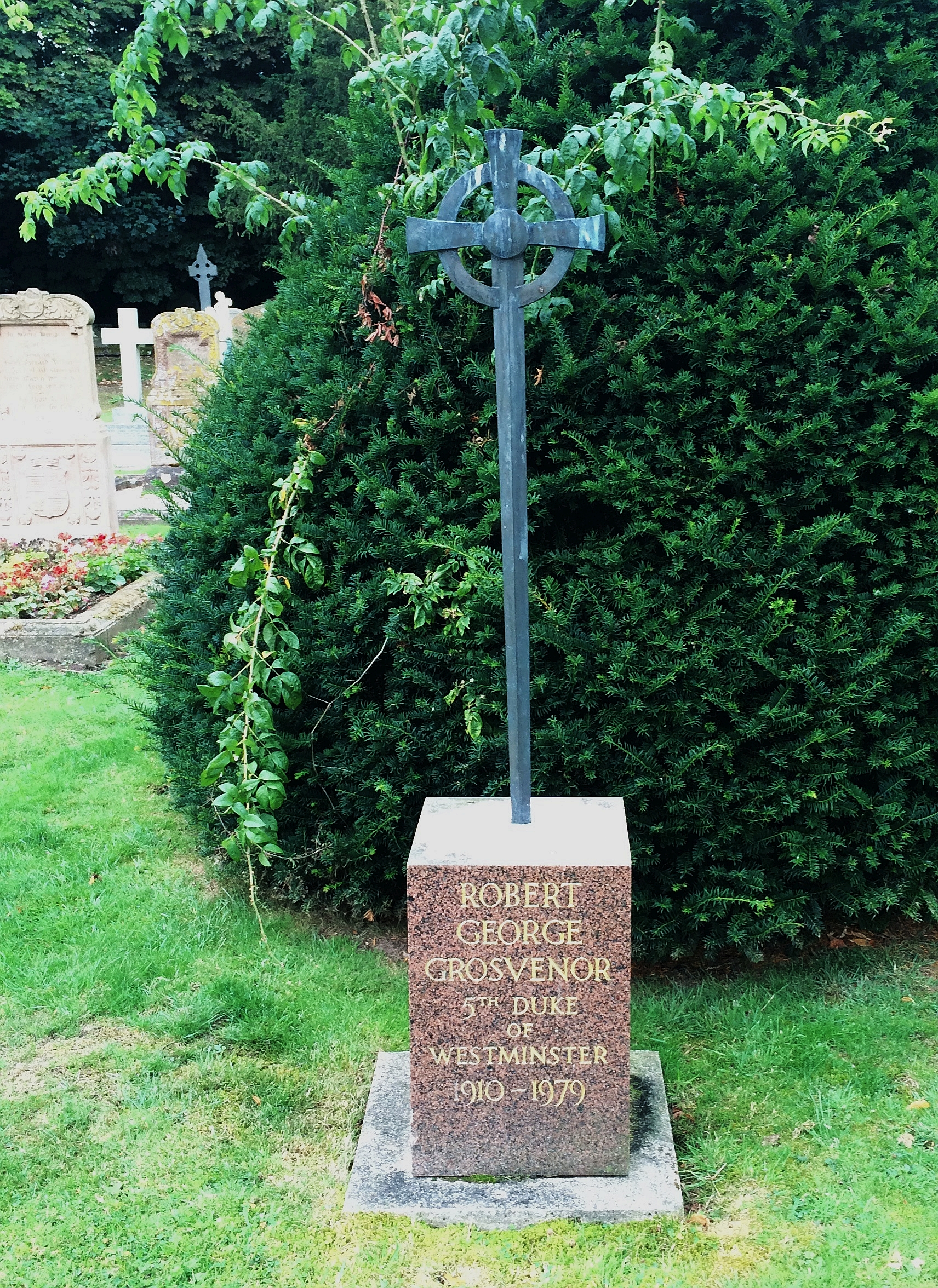
Grave of Robert Grosvenor, 5th Duke of Westminster

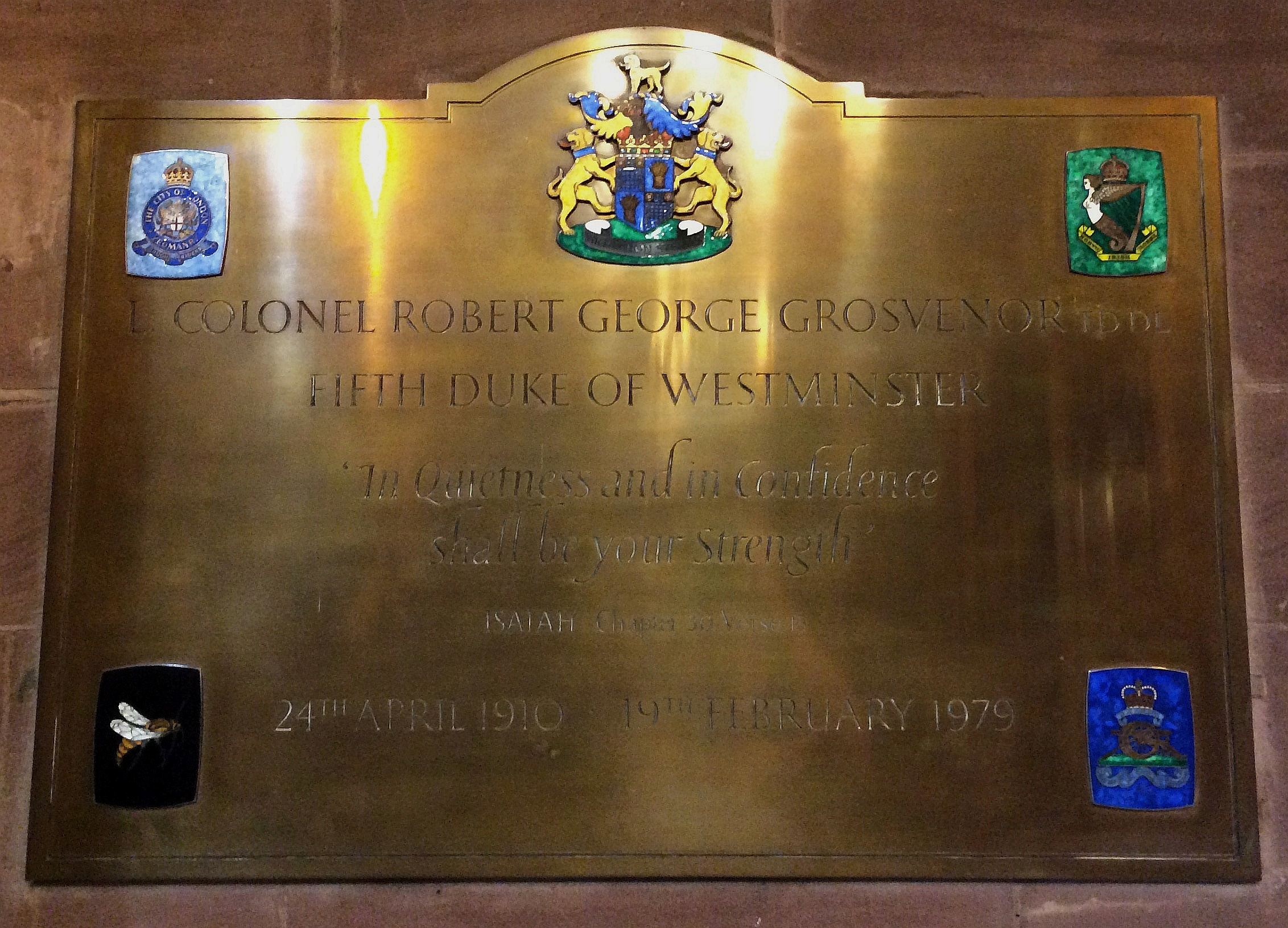
The 5th Duke of Westminster's memorial in Eccleston Church

Westminster died on 19 February 1979 at Ely Lodge, near Enniskillen in Northern Ireland. He was buried in the churchyard of Eccleston Church near Eaton Hall, Cheshire. The Duke had ten grandchildren and eleven great-grandchildren. He is memorialized at St Mary's Church, Eccleston.

Parliament of the United Kingdom
Preceded by Philip Clarke	Member of Parliament for Fermanagh and South Tyrone; 1955–1964	Succeeded by Marquess of Hamilton
Honorary titles
Preceded by Thomas Patrick David Scott	Lord Lieutenant of Fermanagh; 1977–1979	Succeeded by The Duchess of Westminster
Peerage of the United Kingdom
Preceded by Gerald Grosvenor	Duke of Westminster; 1967–1979	Succeeded by Gerald Grosvenor
