= Viola Grosvenor, Duchess of Westminster =

British noblewoman (1912–1987)

Her Grace The Duchess of Westminster

Lord Lieutenant of Fermanagh
- In office 20 August 1979 – 3 May 1987
- Monarch: Elizabeth II
- Preceded by: The Duke of Westminster
- Succeeded by: The Earl Erne

Personal details
- Born: Viola Maud Lyttelton; 10 June 1912 Wandsworth, London
- Died: 3 May 1987 (aged 74) Dungannon, County Tyrone, Northern Ireland
- Spouse: Robert Grosvenor, 5th Duke of Westminster (m. 1946; died 1979)
- Children: Leonora, Countess of Lichfield; Gerald Grosvenor, 6th Duke of Westminster; Lady Jane Dawnay
- Parent: John Lyttelton, 9th Viscount Cobham

Viola Grosvenor, Duchess of Westminster (née Lyttelton; 10 June 1912 – 3 May 1987) was a British aristocrat who was the wife of Robert Grosvenor, 5th Duke of Westminster, the mother of Gerald Grosvenor, 6th Duke of Westminster and the grandmother of Hugh Grosvenor, 7th Duke of Westminster, Charles Innes-Ker, 11th Duke of Roxburghe and Thomas Anson, 6th Earl of Lichfield.

== Early life ==
Born Viola Maud Lyttelton in Wandsworth, London, she was the daughter of John Lyttelton, 9th Viscount Cobham, and Violet Yolande Leonard. Her brother, Charles Lyttelton, 10th Viscount Cobham, played cricket for Worcestershire in the 1930s and was Governor-General of New Zealand from 1957 to 1962. Their cousin was the jazz musician and broadcaster Humphrey Lyttelton.

Her nephew was Major Hugh Lindsay, an equerry to Queen Elizabeth II, who was killed on 10 March 1988, aged 34, in a ski accident after being caught up in an avalanche on Gotschnagrat Mountain while accompanying Charles III as Prince of Wales, on a holiday in Klosters in Switzerland.

As The Hon Viola Lyttelton she gained the rank of Flying Officer in the Women's Auxiliary Air Force, during World War II, where she was mentioned in dispatches.

== Marriage and issue ==
Lyttleton married Robert Grosvenor, a son of Captain Lord Hugh Grosvenor and Lady Mabel Florence Mary Crichton, on 3 December 1946. Robert Grosvenor was granted the style Lord Robert Grosvenor in 1963 and became the 5th Duke of Westminster on the death of his elder brother, the 4th Duke, in 1967. The family had a home at Ely Lodge, just west of Enniskillen, County Fermanagh.

The Duke and Duchess had three children:

- Lady Leonora Mary Grosvenor (born 1 February 1949). Formerly married to Patrick Anson, 5th Earl of Lichfield (3 children, including Thomas Anson, 6th Earl of Lichfield), has not remarried.
- Gerald Cavendish Grosvenor, 6th Duke of Westminster (22 December 1951 – 9 August 2016). Had issue.
- Lady Jane Meriel Grosvenor (born 8 February 1953). Married firstly to Guy Innes-Ker, 10th Duke of Roxburghe (3 children, including Charles Innes-Ker, 11th Duke of Roxburghe), and then to Edward William Dawnay, who is a great-grandson of the 1st Duke of Westminster.

The 5th Duke of Westminster died in 1979.

== Later life and death ==
From 1979 until her death in 1987 she was Lord Lieutenant of Fermanagh and was a strong supporter of the Royal Ulster Constabulary and Ulster Defence Regiment.

In September 1979, Viola represented Queen Elizabeth II at the funeral of Paul Maxwell, a young crew member from Enniskillen in County Fermanagh, who was killed in the same explosion which killed Louis Mountbatten, Earl Mountbatten of Burma, former Viceroy of India and uncle of Prince Philip, Duke of Edinburgh.

Viola was a pianist and music lover and was on the governing body of the Royal Academy of Music. She worked for charities and voluntary organisations including the Girl Guides, Salvation Army, NSPCC and the Royal British Legion.

She ordered workmen to drill holes in the ceiling of Florence Court, the stately home in County Fermanagh, to drain water away during a serious fire which almost destroyed it in 1955.

The Dowager Duchess died in a car accident near Dungannon, County Tyrone, on 3 May 1987, aged 74. She was returning to Ely Lodge, on the shore of Lough Erne. Her funeral was held at St Macartin's Cathedral, Enniskillen amid high security during The Troubles due to her Royal, family connections and her son Gerald also being at the time the UK's richest man. She was interred at Monea Parish Church, following a private family service. A memorial service was subsequently held in June 1987 at St. Michael's Church, Chester Square, which was attended by Prince Richard, Duke of Gloucester and Sir Edward Heath, and included a performance by Julian Lloyd Webber.

== See also ==
- Lyttelton family

Honorary titles
Preceded by The Duke of Westminster	Lord Lieutenant of Fermanagh; 1979–1987	Succeeded by The Earl Erne
