= Hugh Lindsay (British Army officer) =

British equerry (1953–1988)

Major Hugh Lindsay LVO
- Born: Hugh Charles Lyttelton Lindsay; 3 May 1953
- Died: 10 March 1988 (aged 34); Klosters, Switzerland
- Cause of death: Avalanche
- Education: Millfield
- Spouse: Sarah Brennan
- Children: 1
- Military career
- Allegiance: UK
- Branch: British Army
- Service years: 1983–1986 (active service)
- Rank: Major

Major Hugh Charles Lyttelton Lindsay, LVO (3 May 1953 – 10 March 1988) was Equerry to Queen Elizabeth II from 1983 to 1986. He died in an avalanche during a ski trip on 10 March 1988.

== Personal life ==
Lindsay's mother was the Hon Audrey Lavinia Lyttelton (1918–2007), sister of the Hon Viola Maud Lyttelton, who were daughters of John Lyttelton, 9th Viscount Cobham. His father was David Edzell Thomas Lindsay (1910–1968), a great-grandson of Charles Morgan, 1st Baron Tredegar.

Lindsay was educated at Millfield. He married 33-year-old Sarah Brennan MVO in July 1987. The Princess of Wales and Prince Edward attended the ceremony, which was held at the Church of St. Nicholas in Compton, Surrey.

== Military career ==
Lindsay was a major in the British army when he was appointed an equerry to the Queen in October 1983. He was a career soldier who served in the 9th/12th Royal Lancers and returned to full-time army service with the unit in 1986 after serving The Queen. He was made an LVO in 1986.

== Death ==
Major Lindsay died on 10 March 1988, aged 34, in a ski accident after being caught in an avalanche on Gotschnagrat Mountain while accompanying the Prince of Wales (later Charles III) on a holiday in Klosters in Switzerland. A regional avalanche warning was in effect that day above 5,280 feet and the group had been at about 6,000 feet prior to the avalanche. Swiss authorities stated that the avalanche began about 300 feet above the group of six skiers, and that Lindsay and another member of the group, Patricia Palmer-Tomkinson, could not avoid the snow. Both Lindsay and Palmer-Tomkinson were swept away by the avalanche and over a precipice. Lindsay died while Palmer-Tomkinson was severely injured.

In an interview in 1992, the Princess of Wales claimed that she took charge of the arrangements after the accident, as the Prince of Wales was in shock. The group flew back with the body on 12 March and was met with a guard of honour from his regiment. His funeral took place on 17 March at the Royal Military Academy in Sandhurst, with the Queen, the Prince and Princess of Wales, and the Duke and Duchess of York attending. Sarah Lindsay was six or seven months pregnant at the time. She subsequently gave birth to a daughter, Alice Rose Lyttelton Lindsay, on 14 May. She later remarried and took the last name Horsley.

=== Investigation into death ===
A criminal inquiry was opened after the avalanche, to determine whether Prince Charles should face charges for the accident but he was cleared. Authorities announced that, while they would file no criminal charges against the party, the group did cause the avalanche.

== Media depiction ==
Despite the concern of his widow, the death of Lindsay was portrayed in the Netflix drama The Crown in 2020 for its fourth season. She reportedly wrote to the producers and asked them not to portray the accident, stating it was a private tragedy. In response the producers responded by stating that they understood her concerns but the accident would still be portrayed in the series as they deal with difficult subjects with integrity and great sensitivity. His widow was horrified that the series depicted the accident and was concerned about the potential impact of the episode on her daughter. The episode, titled "Avalanche", focuses on the aftermath of the avalanche with real audio reporting of the event imposed over a long-distance shot of an avalanche, with no actor for Lindsay cast for the series.
