= Leonora Anson, Countess of Lichfield =

British aristocrat

Leonora, Countess of Lichfield DCVO
- Born: Leonora Mary Grosvenor; 1 February 1949 (age 77)
- Spouse: Patrick Anson, 5th Earl of Lichfield (m. 1975; div. 1986)
- Children: Lady Rose Anson; Thomas Anson, 6th Earl of Lichfield; Lady Eloise Waymouth
- Parents: Robert Grosvenor, 5th Duke of Westminster (father); The Hon. Viola Lyttelton (mother)

Leonora Mary Anson, Countess of Lichfield, CVO (née Grosvenor; born 1 February 1949) is a lady-in-waiting to Anne, Princess Royal. She is the daughter of Robert Grosvenor, 5th Duke of Westminster, and The Hon. Viola Lyttelton. She is the former wife of the late noted society photographer, Patrick Anson, 5th Earl of Lichfield.

== Biography ==
Leonora grew up at Ely Lodge, in Blaney, County Fermanagh, Northern Ireland, before attending Sherborne School for Girls. In 1967, her father acceded to the Dukedom of Westminster and she became known as Lady Leonora Grosvenor.

In the 1997 New Year Honours, Leonora was made a Lieutenant of the Royal Victorian Order. She was upgraded to a Commander in the 2020 Birthday Honours.

Since 1979, the Countess has been an extra lady-in-waiting to The Princess Royal.

== Marriage and issue ==
In 1967, she was named debutante of the year. During the season she met photographer Patrick Anson, 5th Earl of Lichfield. On 8 March 1975, they were married at Chester Cathedral, and she became The Countess of Lichfield.

Guests at their wedding included Queen Elizabeth II, Queen Elizabeth the Queen Mother, King Constantine II and Queen Anne-Marie of Greece, Princess Beatrix of the Netherlands, and Princess Benedikte of Denmark.

They had three children:

- Lady Rose Meriel Margaret Anson (born 27 July 1976)
- Thomas Anson, 6th Earl of Lichfield (born 19 July 1978)
- Lady Eloise Anne Elizabeth Anson (born 1981), married 2013 Louis Waymouth

The couple were divorced in 1986 and, as she has not remarried, the Countess retains her title. Lord Lichfield died on 11 November 2005.

== Honours ==
She was appointed Lieutenant of the Royal Victorian Order (LVO) in the 1997 New Year Honours and Commander of the Royal Victorian Order (CVO) in the 2020 Birthday Honours.

== Other sources ==
- Burke's Peerage
- Who's Who 2009
