= Blesma, The Limbless Veterans =

UK charitable organization

- Formation: 1932
- Type: British military support charity
- Purpose: Supporting wounded and limbless British Armed Forces servicemen and women
- Headquarters: Chelmsford, Essex
- Location: Chelmsford
- Region served: United Kingdom
- Chief Executive Officer: Vivienne Buck CBE
- Website: www.blesma.org
- Formerly called: British Limbless Ex-Servicemen's Association

Blesma, The Limbless Veterans (formerly known as the British Limbless Ex-Servicemen's Association) is a British charity that helps all serving and ex-Service men and women who have lost limbs, or lost the use of limbs or eyes, to rebuild their lives by providing rehabilitation activities and welfare support. It operates throughout the United Kingdom and is a registered charity.

== History ==
Wounded veterans making their own limbs after WW1

Blesma Huddersfield Branch

In the immediate aftermath of WW1, limbless men came together for their treatments and fittings, and there developed a spirit of kinship amongst them, arising from their common disabilities and shared experiences. The crutch, the walking stick, the empty sleeve, served as an introduction to friends who had met with similar misfortunes in battle. The spirit of comradeship which had existed in the trenches was kept alive amongst them.

It was during this time that limbless men gathered to discuss their problems and the possibility of some action to improve their conditions.

The first such group was in Glasgow, and in 1921 they created the first branch of the Limbless Ex-Service Men's Association. Soon groups formed in Edinburgh, Dundee, Hamilton and Aberdeen. Officers of the Scottish LESMA established contact with limbless ex-Servicemen in the North of England, and in 1929, branches were formed in Manchester, Leeds, Hull, Burnley, Accrington, Southport, Oldham, Bradford, Halifax and Wigan.

The English branches, however, became dissatisfied with Scottish control and asked for a proper constitution to provide for the democratic election of officers and an executive council. The English branches convened a round table meeting in Leeds in 1931 where it was decided to form the British Limbless Ex-Servicemen's Association, with the first Annual Conference being held in Manchester in 1932.

It was not until the commencement of World War II that branches formed in the South of England but by the end of the war there were 43 groups.

The number of branches reached their peak in the mid-1950s when there were a total of 124. As the number of surviving veterans from World War I declined, so did the number of branches. This trend continued with the passing of the World War II generation, and today 9 branches remain.

== Membership ==
Eligibility. To be eligible for Membership, a person must have served in any arm of Her Majesty's Armed Forces, regular or reserve and have suffered a life-changing injury – either loss of limb or loss of use of limb, eyesight, hearing or speech. The injury could have been sustained during or after Service, and can be as a direct result of Service or not.

If a person has lost a limb in service or has lost the use of limbs, suffered permanent loss of speech, hearing, or sight whilst serving or as a result of service in any branch of Her Majesty's Forces or Auxiliary Forces they may be eligible for Membership.

For example:

- Amputation of a limb or limbs – (does not need to be combat related)
- Loss of use of a limb or limbs (means loss of function of that limb). For example, through spinal cord injury, neurological injury or illness or mechanical loss of function.
- Loss of speech due to neurological illness or injury - such as stroke or cancer
- Loss of hearing (above 80% loss)
- Loss of sight (above 80% loss) or loss of an eye or eyes.

Also eligible are those of civilian status who lose a limb, or the loss of use of a limb, or an eye as a result of War Service or enemy or terrorist action against HM Forces with which those of civilian status are employed, or volunteer, to provide direct support.

Those who think they may be eligible for Blesma Membership can find out more and apply online.

=== Member Proposition ===
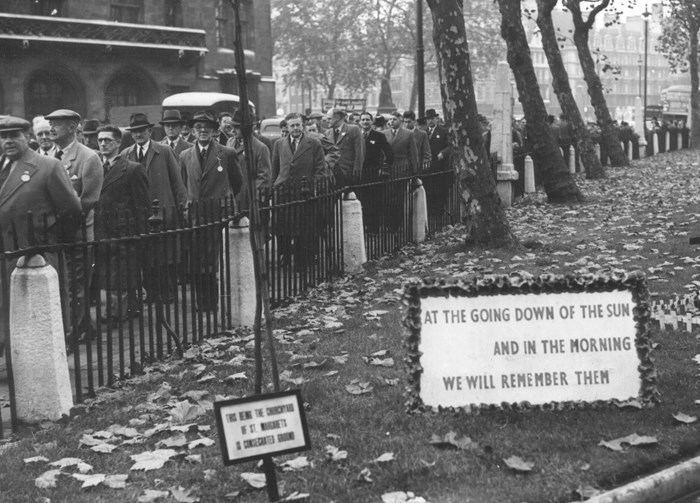
Blesma pressing for an increase to pensions for war limbless

Blesma offers a wide range of support to Members and their families, including:

- Advice and information on orthotics, prosthetics, mobility aid provision, benefits and the War Pension or Armed Forces Compensation Scheme.
- Financial assistance in the form of grants to help with the additional costs and hardships of living with disability.
- A year-round calendar of activities; this comprehensive range of activities and courses stretches from the cerebral to the adrenaline- fueled and includes breaks for couples and families.
- Advocacy to ensure prosthetics and disabled provision meets the needs of every individual Member; Blesma speaks up and campaigns for its Membership where necessary.
- Opportunities to assist fellow Members through volunteering.
- A uniquely personal approach; which places great emphasis on caring, listening, and striving to learn, never patronizing, and always putting Members' needs first.

== Governance ==
Blesma is governed by a board of trustees consisting of industry experts and Members of the charity. The board of trustees is chaired by Ed Davis.

== Support ==
Blesma supports its Members through nine Regional Blesma Support Officers (BSOs) based across the UK, who provide welfare support and advice on a range of issues from benefits to isolation by conducting home visits. The BSOs are supported by Outreach Officers who engage with local communities and Members to keep them connected and to raise the profile of the charity. There is also a Prosthetics Support Officer whose role is specifically to do with assisting Members with their prosthetics or other mobility requirements. The Prosthetics BSO can advocate on behalf of a Member at their limb centre or on the Veterans Prosthetics Panel, for example, and make sure they are getting a good level of support and representation at the required level.

The charity's main office is based in Chelmsford.

== Milestones ==
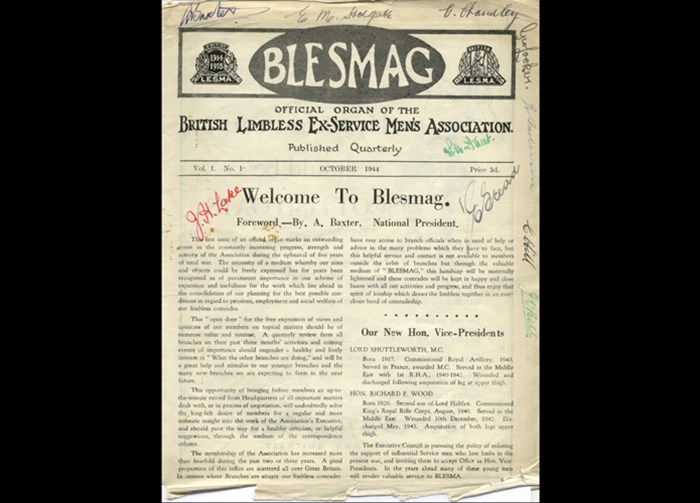
1st BLESMAG

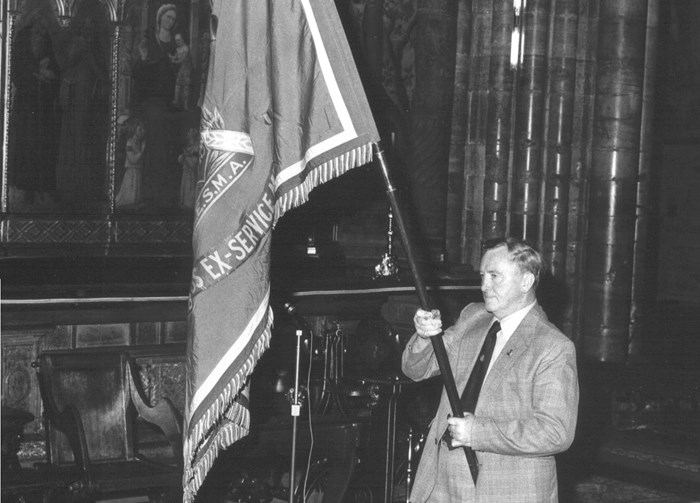
Blesma Golden Jubilee. 50 years of Blesma

- 1932 – Blesma formed as a national charity, first annual conference held in Manchester.
- 1945 – Blesmag started.
- 1946 – Blesma Advisory Council formed.
- 1947 – Charles Dunham appointed Employment and Welfare Officer.
- 1948 – Blesma National Appeal Committee formed. Duchess of Gloucester becomes Patron of Blesma.
- 1949 – Cyril Stephens appointed National President in succession to Arthur Baxter. Blesma Headquarters Welfare Committee formed. Official opening of the Blackpool Home.
- 1951 – Blesma All-Party Committee of MPs formed.
- 1954 – Opening of Blesma Portsmouth Home.
- 1958 – Transfer of Blesma HQ from Manchester to Cannon Street, London. Charles Dunham appointed National General Secretary. Grant of Armorial Bearings to Blesma.
- 1959 – Number of First World War limbless drops below 20,000.
- 1963 – Opening of Blesma Crieff Home. Blesma joins World Veterans Foundation.
- 1965 – Blesma HQ moved to Chadwell Heath, Essex.
- 1966 – Amputees Advisory Service for hospital visiting introduced by Blesma. Recommendations of McCorquodale Committee accepted.
- 1970 – Funds raised by Blesma National Appeal Committee passes £1million mark.
- 1975 – Philip Dixon appointed National chairman in succession to Ernie Law. Portsmouth Home closed. First World War limbless drops below 4,000.
- 1976 – Members ascend Mount Snowdon with Prince Charles.
- 1977 – Blesma welfare grants annually exceed £50,000.
- 1978 – Blesma film 'So Much To Offer' released, with commentary by Kenneth More. Blesma float joins the Lord Mayors Show in central London.
- 1979 – Hrubec/Ryder report on amputations and cardio-vascular disorder published and accepted by the Government.
- 1980 – Mr Ted Lawrence takes over as National Welfare Officer.
- 1981 – Mr Brian Fox takes over as National General Secretary. Limbless ex-servicemen down to about 10,000. Himalayan peak of Nun Kun (23,410 ft) climbed by Ealing Member, Norman Croucher.
- 1982 – Blesma Golden Jubilee
- 1983 – Sir Austin 'Tiny' Bunch CBE takes over as National President
- 1989 – Ray Holland takes over as National General Secretary
- 1992 – Duke of Westminster takes over as National President
- 2000 – Jerome Church OBE takes over as National General Secretary
- 2013 – General Secretary role changes to Chief Executive. New Magazine
- 2014 – Barry Le Grys MBE takes over as Chief Executive. Renaming of charity from BLESMA (British Limbless Ex-Servicemen's Association) to Blesma, The Limbless Veterans. The inaugural Invictus Games in London featured more than 400 competitors, both serving personnel and veterans, from 13 nations, including 46 Blesma Members.
- 2015 – The White Report commissioned by Blesma and written by triple amputee Member Jon White, was the most detailed study of how the nation's 160 most complex war wounded men and women are treated. It found failings across the NHS and called for a fresh approach to their care, resulting in a number of improvements made by the NHS.
- 2016 – Those who lose the use of their limb(s) through a traumatic incident that is not service related are now eligible for the charity's support. Blesma's Blackpool home closed with the 12 remaining residents moved to different nursing homes across the North West.

== Patrons ==
- 1948–2004 Princess Alice, Duchess of Gloucester
- 2006–present Prince Richard, Duke of Gloucester

== National presidents ==
- 1932–1938 Sam Doubleday
- 1938–1949 Arthur Baxter OBE
- 1949–1956 Cyril Stephens OBE
- 1956–1983 Earl of Ancaster KCVO
- 1983–1992 Sir Austin 'Tiny' Bunch CBE
- 1992–2016 Duke of Westminster KG CB CVO OBE TD CD DL

== National General Secretaries ==
- 1934–1937 J V Bell
- 1937–1958 George Chandley OBE MM
- 1958–1980 Charles Dunham MBE
- 1981–1989 Brian Fox
- 1989–2000 Ray Holland
- 2000–2014 Jerome Church OBE

Title changed to Chief Executive from 2013

- 2014–2019 Barry Le Grys MBE
- 2020–2023 Jon Bryant OBE
- 2023-present Vivienne Buck CBE
