= Gerald Grosvenor, 6th Duke of Westminster =

British landowner, businessman, aristocrat and Territorial Army officer (1951–2016)

Major General His Grace The Duke of Westminster KG CB CVO OBE KStJ TD VR CD DL
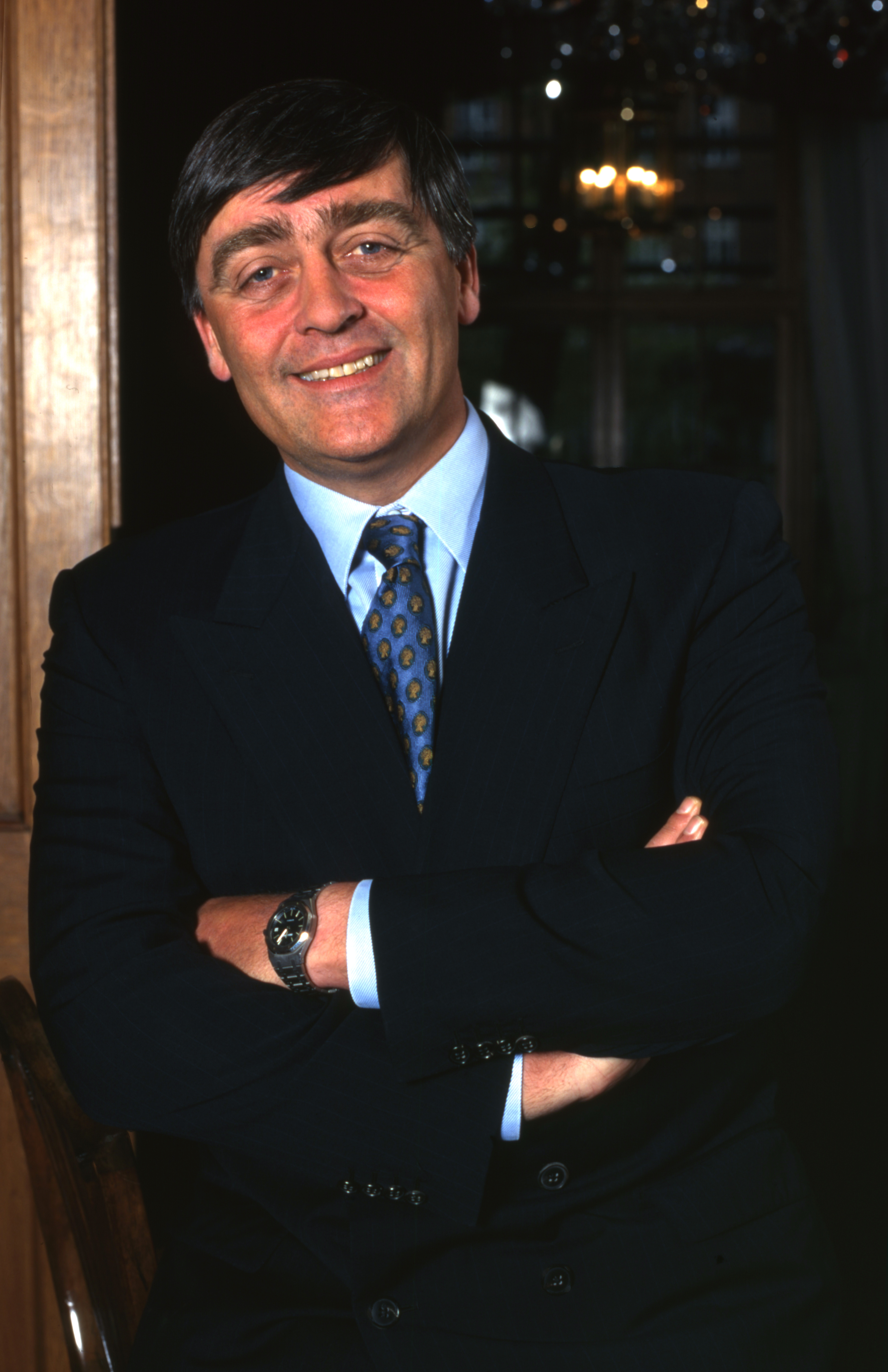
- Photographed by Allan Warren in 1997

Member of the House of Lords Lord Temporal
- In office 19 February 1979 – 11 November 1999 as a hereditary peer
- Preceded by: The 5th Duke of Westminster
- Succeeded by: Seat abolished

Personal details
- Born: Gerald Cavendish Grosvenor; 22 December 1951 Omagh, County Tyrone, Northern Ireland
- Died: 9 August 2016 (aged 64) Preston, Lancashire, England
- Spouse: Natalia Phillips (m. 1978)
- Children: Lady Tamara van Cutsem; Lady Edwina Snow; Hugh Grosvenor, 7th Duke of Westminster; Lady Viola Roberts
- Parents: Robert Grosvenor, 5th Duke of Westminster; Viola Lyttelton
- Known for: Landowning; Property development; Philanthropy
- Civilian awards: Knight Companion of the Order of the Garter; Commander of the Royal Victorian Order
- Website: www.grosvenorestate.com

Military service
- Allegiance: United Kingdom
- Branch/service: British Army
- Years of service: 1973–2012
- Rank: Major General
- Unit: North Irish Horse
- Commands: Assistant Chief of the Defence Staff (Reserves and Cadets) (2004–2007); Deputy Commander Land Forces (Reserves) (2011–2012)
- Military awards: Companion of the Order of the Bath; Officer of the Order of the British Empire; Efficiency Decoration; Volunteer Reserves Service Medal; Canadian Forces' Decoration

Major General Gerald Cavendish Grosvenor, 6th Duke of Westminster (22 December 1951 – 9 August 2016) was a British landowner, businessman, aristocrat, Territorial Army general, and peer. He was the son of Robert Grosvenor, 5th Duke of Westminster, and Viola Lyttelton. He was Chairman of the property company Grosvenor Group. In the first-ever edition of The Sunday Times Rich List, published in 1989, he was ranked as the second-richest person in the United Kingdom, with a fortune of £3.2 billion (approximately £8.47 billion in today's value), with only Queen Elizabeth II above him.

Born in Northern Ireland, Grosvenor moved from an island in the middle of Lower Lough Erne to be educated at Sunningdale and Harrow boarding schools in the south of England. After a troubled education, he left school with two O-Levels. He entered the Royal Military Academy, Sandhurst, and served in the Territorial Army, where he was promoted to major-general in 2004.

Via Grosvenor Estates, the business he inherited along with the dukedom in 1979, the Duke was the richest property developer in the United Kingdom and one of the country's largest landowners, with property in Edinburgh, Liverpool, Oxford, Cambridge, Southampton and Cheshire, including the family's country seat of Eaton Hall, as well as 300 acres (120 ha) of Mayfair and Belgravia in Central London. The business also has interests in other parts of Europe. According to The Sunday Times Rich List in 2016, the Duke was worth £9.35 billion, placing him sixth on the list and making him the third-richest British citizen.

The Duke died on 9 August 2016 after suffering a heart attack. The titles then passed to his only son, Hugh.

== Family and other businesses ==
The sixth Duke of Westminster inherited a crush of debt from death duties. With shrewd investments he and his advisors turned the family business, which was not personal wealth of the Grosvenor family anymore, into a healthy business. The sixth Duke of Westminster was a reluctant billionaire. "Given the choice, I would rather not have been born wealthy, but I never think of giving up. I can't sell. It does not belong to me."

Leslie Field—Tatler journalist and biographer of the second Duke of Westminster—explained why Gerard Grosvenor, the 6th Duke, was not the owner of the Grosvenor capital. In his last will, dated in November 1952, "Bendor" (Hugh Grosvenor, 2nd Duke of Westminster) provided that his direct survivors would not inherit his capital. Apart from numerous legacies and annuities he created a trust for the benefit of all future dukes. 'The trust was to be controlled in the first instance by his executors, and then by a Board of Trustees of whom the current duke might, or might not, be one. The scheme ensured that the bulk of the fortune would by-pass the three elderly cousins in line to succeed him and devolve upon the future 5th Duke's infant son. Assets were divided into twenty parts and at the time of Bendor's death, the present Duke (the 6th), received three parts. His portion was doubled when William, the 3rd Duke died in 1963, increased to nine-twentieths when Gerald the 4th and childless Duke, his uncle, died in 1967, and to twelve-twentieths when his father, the 5th Duke, died in 1979. Although Gerald the 4th and Robert the 5th Dukes controlled their Estate income absolutely, the capital value was held ‘in fee simple' by the trustees.'

The Grosvenor family became very rich as a result of lease constructions in Great Britain. In the 17th century Sir Thomas Grosvenor married Mary Davies, owner of land near London. Their son Richard (1689–1732) adopted the lease construction. In the explanation of Tom Quinn, in his critical book about the sixth Duke of Westminster: 'Rather than build houses himself, he adopted the system favoured by many landowners [...] at the time: he sold building leases on what is now Mayfair. The idea was that the buyer of a lease would build a house and then sell on the lease. The householder had the use of the house for sixty or a hundred years and the land then reverted to the Grosvenors. The value of improvements made at the expense of the leaseholder would all revert to the landowner after the expiration of the lease—an injustice created by the landed aristocracy for their own benefit and challenged only in the 1990s by Prime Minister Margaret Thatcher.'

The Grosvenor family's first development was in Mayfair, Central London, in the early 18th century; the second big development came around 100 years later and was in another exclusive part of London—Belgravia, developed by the family after the end of Napoleonic Wars and the conversion of Buckingham Palace—which is just one mile east. After developing the two parts of Central London, the family business expanded. During the second half of the 20th century, the business expanded into the Americas and developed Annacis Island and Vancouver, both in British Columbia in the west of Canada in the 1950s. The family business started developing in Australia in the 1960s. They moved to Asia in the early 1990s and to Continental Europe just before the millennium. In April 2000, the firm moved into new London offices. The business was headed by the 6th Duke himself, who was Chairman of the Trustees of the Grosvenor Group.

The Duke was also Director of Claridge's Hotel from 1981 until 1993, and of Marcher Sound from 1992 until 1997.

== Early life ==
As a child, the Duke lived on an island in the middle of Lower Lough Erne in Northern Ireland (Ely Lodge, Blaney, County Fermanagh). His early education was in Northern Ireland before he was sent at age seven to Sunningdale School in Ascot, followed by Harrow. Because of his Fermanagh accent, the Duke struggled to fit in at first, and even after his accent was "bullied" out of him, he found it difficult to make friends. His sense of isolation became worse after the death in 1967 of his uncle, the 4th Duke. His schoolmates ostracised him because the newly styled Earl Grosvenor became the heir to the Grosvenor fortune. "One's so-called friends," he recalled, "disappeared like snow in the summer." Unhappy at boarding school, his education suffered. He left school with two O‑Levels in history and English.

== Military career ==
As Earl Grosvenor he joined the Territorial Army in 1970, as a trooper, family estate responsibilities having caused him to abandon a Regular Army career in the 9th/12th Lancers. After entering RMA Sandhurst in 1973, he passed out as an officer cadet and was commissioned a second lieutenant in the Territorial and Army Volunteer Reserve of the Royal Armoured Corps (Queen's Own Yeomanry) on 13 May 1973. He was promoted to lieutenant on 13 May 1975 and to captain on 1 July 1980. He was promoted to the acting rank of major on 1 January 1985 and to the substantive rank on 22 December.

Promoted to lieutenant-colonel on 1 April 1992, he subsequently commanded the North Irish Horse, the Cheshire Yeomanry Squadron, founded by his ancestors, and the Queen's Own Yeomanry. He was promoted to colonel on 31 December 1994 and was appointed honorary colonel of the 7th Regt Army Air Corps (1 January 1996) and the Northumbrian Universities Officer Training Corps (30 November 1995). Promoted to brigadier on 17 January 2000, he was also appointed Honorary Colonel of the Royal Mercian and Lancastrian Yeomanry on 14 May 2001. He was also appointed Colonel-in-Chief of the Canadian Royal Westminster Regiment, the North Irish Horse, and as Colonel Commandant Yeomanry.

The Duke was Grand Prior of the Priory of England of the Military and Hospitaller Order of St Lazarus of Jerusalem, 1995–2001. In 2004, he was appointed to the new post of Assistant Chief of the Defence Staff (Reserves and Cadets), with promotion in the rank of major-general. In March 2007, having served in the Ministry of Defence as Assistant CDS for four years, he handed over responsibility for 50,000 reservists and 138,000 cadets to Major General Simon Lalor, in the wake of the Eliot Spitzer prostitution scandal in which Westminster was also implicated. The Duke became Deputy Commander Land Forces (Reserves) in May 2011. He retired from the Armed Forces in 2012.

=== Benevolent work for service personnel ===
The Duke was President of the BLESMA from 1992, and the Yeomanry Benevolent Fund from 2005, national Vice-President of the Royal British Legion from 1993, and the Reserve Forces' Ulysses Trust from 1995, the Not Forgotten Society from 2004, and Chairman of the Nuffield Trust for the Forces of the Crown from 1992, all until his death. He was Vice-President of the Royal Engineers Music Foundation 1990–94.

In 2011, having already funded a feasibility study, the Duke purchased the estate at Stanford Hall, Nottinghamshire, to make possible the creation of a Defence and National Rehabilitation Centre (DNRC) to provide the highest-quality support for military casualties. Work started on the £300 million project in April 2016, and was completed in 2018 to replace those at Headley Court. The Duke remained actively involved in the project until his death.

He was Vice-President of the Royal United Services Institute from 1993 until 2012, President of The Tank Museum, Bovington, from 2002, and a committee member of the National Army Museum between 1988–1997 and from 2013 until his death. He was one of the founding trustees on the creation of National Museums Liverpool in 1986.

According to Tom Quinn, in his critical book The Reluctant Billionaire, the sixth Duke mainly acted as figurehead for charities. He rarely gave large sums of money directly to the numerous charities he supported officially. It was only towards the end of his life that he set up a charity himself, to help injured servicemen. In a few years he spent 50 million pounds to set up a rehabilitation centre: the DNRC. Quinn quotes the duke himself: 'In many ways I'm a perfect example of a person who is famous for being famous—I mean a sort of second-rate celebrity! I get invited to things not because I have achieved great things in life but I'm afraid just because I am a duke. I go along with it because what else is there for a duke to do? As I have said many times, we, the aristocracy, in practical terms, are an irrelevance in the modern world. We just cut ribbons, open supermarkets and look the part.'

== Educational interests ==
Despite his poor educational attainments, Westminster was given several honorary degrees and fellowships (listed below) in later life and took an outward-looking interest in youth. He was Director of the International Students Trust from 1976 until 1993, Pro-Chancellor of Keele University from 1986 until 1993, Chancellor of Manchester Metropolitan University from 1992 until 2002, and first appointed Chancellor of the University of Chester in 2005, serving until his death.

He was a supporter of The Prince's Trust and was a committee member of the Trust and a Patron from 2001 for North West England.

== Sports interests and conservation work ==
His main personal recreations were field shooting and fishing. He served as President of the Game & Wildlife Conservation Trust for 1987–2000 and Vice-President thereafter, President of the British Association for Shooting and Conservation from 1992 until 2000, and the Atlantic Salmon Trust from 2004 until his death. He was a member of the MCC and Royal Yacht Squadron and President of Worcestershire County Cricket Club in 1984–1986 and of the Youth Sports Trust 1996–2004.

He was President of the committee planning the 2002 Commonwealth Games in Manchester from 1998, and from 1991 until 1994 had been Director of the committee set up to coordinate the projected 2000 Summer Olympic Games and Paralympics that would have been held at Manchester had the British bid succeeded.

== Other charities and organisations ==
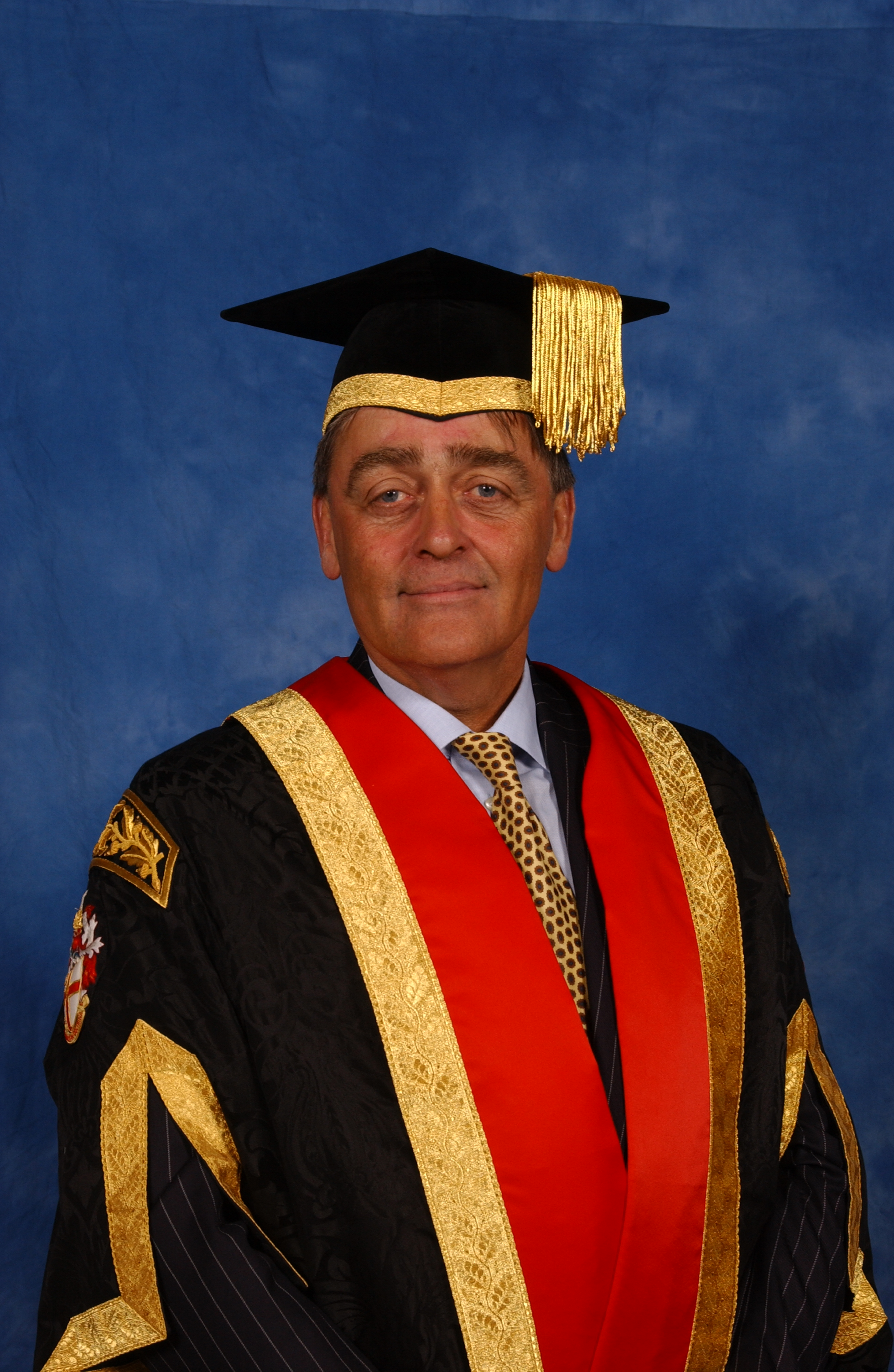
His Grace the 6th Duke of Westminster, Foundation Chancellor of the University of Chester 2005–2016

- President, Scope (formerly the Spastics Society), 1982–2005
- President, National Kidney Research Fund, 1985–1997
- President, Royal National Institute for the Blind, 1986–2012
- President, North of England Zoological Society, 1987 until death
- President, Drugs and Alcohol Foundation, 1987–1997
- Vice-President, Royal Society of St George, 1987 until death
- President, Holstein UK & Ireland (formerly British Holstein Society), 1988
- Life Vice-President, National Society for the Prevention of Cruelty to Children, 1988 until death
- President, Chester and District Scout Council, 1979 until death
- President, Abbeyfield Society, 1989–1995
- President, Institution of Environmental Sciences, 1989–2013
- Director, Business in the Community (BITC), 1991–1995
- Life Governor, Royal Agricultural Society of England
- Committee member, North American Advisory Group, British Overseas Trade Board, 1994
- Committee member, Nuffield Hospitals, 1995 until death
- Vice-President, Country Landowners' Association, 1999 until death
- President, Life Education Centre (Drug Prevention), 2000–2012
- Vice-President, Royal Smithfield Club, 2004 until death
- Foundation Chancellor of the University of Chester, 2005 until death
- Patron, Cheshire County Federation of Young Farmers' Clubs, until death

He served as a judge in Prince Edward's charity television special The Grand Knockout Tournament in 1987.

== Personal life ==
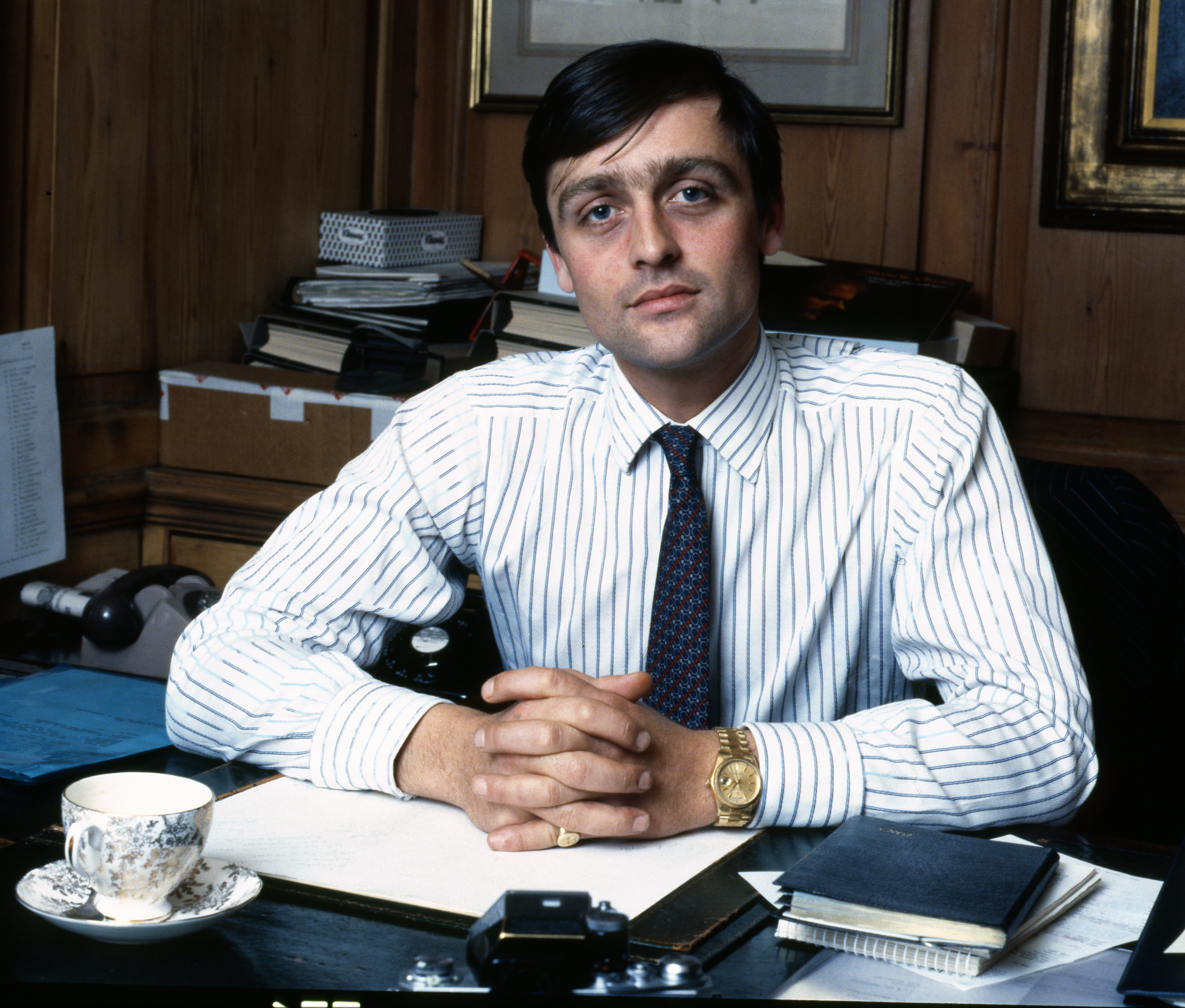
The Duke at his desk in 1988

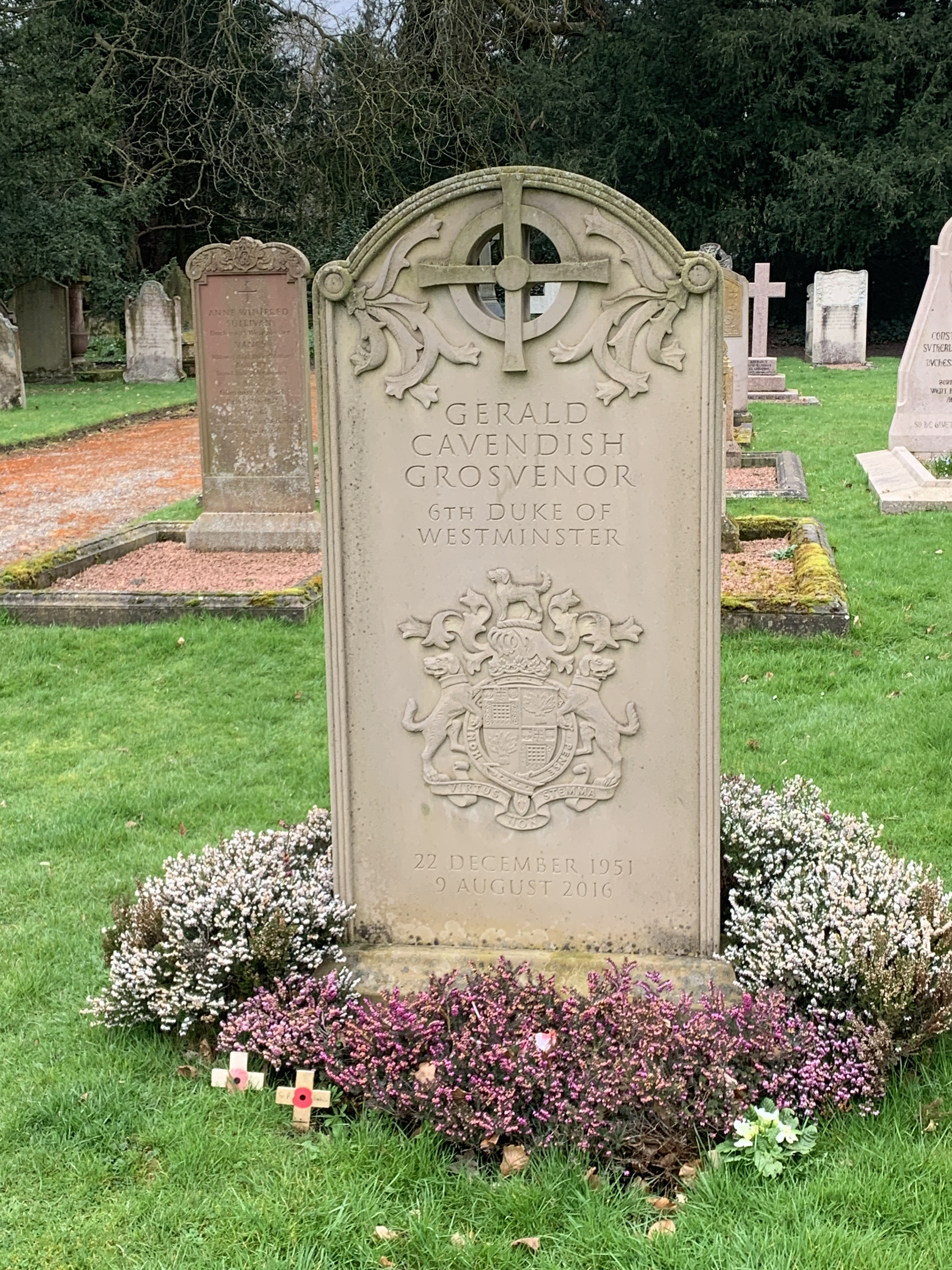
The grave of the 6th Duke of Westminster

The Duke of Westminster married Natalia Ayesha Phillips, the daughter of Lt-Col. Harold Pedro Joseph Phillips and his wife Georgina Wernher, in 1978. Their children are:

- Lady Tamara Katherine Grosvenor (born 20 December 1979), married Edward van Cutsem (son of Hugh van Cutsem) on 6 November 2004.
- Lady Edwina Louise Grosvenor (born 4 November 1981). She is a prison reformer and philanthropist, co-founding The Clink Restaurants. She married historian and television presenter Dan Snow on 27 November 2010.
- Hugh Grosvenor, 7th Duke of Westminster (born 29 January 1991). He is the godfather of Prince George of Wales and Prince Archie of Sussex. He married Olivia Henson on 7 June 2024 at Chester Cathedral
- Lady Viola Georgina Grosvenor (born 12 October 1992), married Angus Roberts, of the Royal Scots Dragoon Guards, in 2022.

In 1998, the Duke suffered a nervous breakdown and had a severe depression, citing the overwhelming pressures of business and public life. In 2007 he was alleged to have hired escort girls. His name was mentioned in the Eliot Spitzer prostitution scandal. Tabloid newspapers suggested that the Duke of Westminster was one of the wealthy clients of the New York-based Emperors Club VIP.

== Death ==
The Duke died on 9 August 2016, aged 64, at Royal Preston Hospital in Preston, Lancashire, after suffering a heart attack at his Abbeystead Estate. A private funeral attended by close relatives was held on 12 August, and a memorial service was held at Chester Cathedral on 28 November. He is buried in the family plot at St Mary's Church, Eccleston.

That the Grosvenor family stood to pay very little, if any, inheritance tax on his £9 billion fortune led to calls for a review of how the inheritance of trust funds and similar assets are handled in the UK.

== Honours ==
=== Orders and medals ===

Order of the Bath	Royal Victorian Order	Order of the British Empire	Order of Saint John
Queen Elizabeth II; Silver Jubilee Medal	Queen Elizabeth II; Golden Jubilee Medal	Queen Elizabeth II; Diamond Jubilee Medal	Efficiency Decoration
Volunteer Reserves; Service Medal	Canadian Forces'; Decoration	Order of Saint Lazarus	Royal Order of Francis I

Country	Date	Appointment	Ribbon	Post-nominal letters	Notes
United Kingdom	13 January 1987	Commander of the Order of St John		CStJ	Advanced to KStJ in 1991
United Kingdom	11 November 1991	Knight of the Order of St John		KStJ	
United Kingdom	1994	Territorial Decoration		TD	
United Kingdom	30 December 1994	Officer of the Order of the British Empire		OBE	
House of Orléans	1995	Knight Grand Cross of the Order of Saint Lazarus			
United Kingdom	6 February 2002	Queen Elizabeth II Golden Jubilee Medal			
United Kingdom	23 April 2003	Knight Companion of the Order of the Garter		KG	
Canada	2004	Canadian Forces' Decoration		CD	
House of Bourbon-Two Sicilies	2006	Knight Grand Cross of the Royal Order of Francis I			
United Kingdom	14 June 2008	Companion of the Order of the Bath		CB	
United Kingdom	6 February 2012	Queen Elizabeth II Diamond Jubilee Medal			
United Kingdom	29 May 2012	Volunteer Reserves Service Medal		VR	
United Kingdom	16 June 2012	Commander of the Royal Victorian Order		CVO	

=== Other ===
- 1973 He received the Freedom of the City of Chester
- 20 July 1981 He received the Freedom of the City of London
- 29 March 1982 He was appointed a Deputy Lieutenant of Cheshire (DL)
- 1990 He received the Honorary Degree of Doctor of Laws from Keele University.
- 1990 He received an Honorary Fellowship from Liverpool Polytechnic
- 1993 He received the Honorary Degree of Doctor of Letters from Manchester Metropolitan University.
- 14 March 2000 He received the Honorary Degree of Doctor of Letters from University of Salford
- 2000 He received the Honorary Degree of Doctor of Laws from the University of Chester
- 2001 He received an Honorary Fellowship from the University of Central Lancashire
- 2013 He was awarded an Honorary Degree from Harper Adams University.

=== Honorary military appointments ===
- Honorary Colonel The Queen's Own Yeomanry
- Honorary Colonel 7th Regt. Army Air Corps (1 January 1996 – 9 August 2016)
- Honorary Colonel The Queen's Own Yeomanry (14 May 2001 – April 2014)
- Colonel-in-Chief Royal Westminster Regiment, New Westminster, BC, Canada
- Honorary Colonel Yeomanry, Royal Armoured Corps
- Honorary Colonel Northumbrian Universities Officer Training Corps (30 November 1995 – 9 August 2016)

== Arms ==
Coat of arms of Major General Gerald Cavendish Grosvenor, 6th Duke of Westminster, KG, CB, CVO, OBE, TD, CD, DL
Notes The dukedom of Westminster was created by Queen Victoria in 1874. Coronet A Coronet of a Duke Crest A Talbot statant Or Escutcheon Quarterly: 1st and 4th, Azure a Portcullis with chains pendant Or on a Chief of the last between two united Roses of York and Lancaster a Pale charged with the Arms of King Edward the Confessor (City of Westminster); 2nd and 3rd, Azure a Garb Or (Grosvenor) Supporters On either side a Talbot reguardant Or collared Azure Motto Virtus Non Stemma (Virtue not ancestry) Orders Order of the Garter; Order of the Bath; Royal Victorian Order; Order of the British Empire

== Ancestry ==
Ancestors of Gerald Grosvenor, 6th Duke of Westminster

8. Hugh Grosvenor, 1st Duke of Westminster
4. Lord Hugh Grosvenor
9. Hon. Katherine Cavendish (1857–1941)
2. Robert Grosvenor, 5th Duke of Westminster
10. John Henry Crichton, 4th Earl Erne
5. Lady Mabel Crichton (1882–1944)
11. Lady Florence Cole (1849–1924)
1. Gerald Grosvenor, 6th Duke of Westminster
12. Charles Lyttelton, 8th Viscount Cobham
6. John Lyttelton, 9th Viscount Cobham
13. Hon. Mary Cavendish (1853–1937)
3. Hon. Viola Lyttelton
14. Charles Henry Brandt Leonard (1855–1921)
7. Violet Leonard
15. Catherine Le Sueur

== See also ==
- List of billionaires
- List of dukes in the peerages of Britain and Ireland
- Westminster City Council v Duke of Westminster

== Bibliography ==
- Quinn, Tom The Reluctant Billionaire: The Tragic Life of Gerald Grosvenor, 6th Duke of Westminster, Biteback Publishing 2017.

Military offices
New title	Assistant Chief of the Defence Staff (Reserves and Cadets); 2004–2007	Succeeded by Simon Lalor
New title	Deputy Commander Land Forces (Reserves); 2011–2012	Succeeded by Ranald Munro
Academic offices
New title	Chancellor of the University of Chester; 2005–2016	Succeeded by Gyles Brandreth
Peerage of the United Kingdom
Preceded by Robert Grosvenor	Duke of Westminster; 1979–2016; Member of the House of Lords (1979–1999)	Succeeded by Hugh Grosvenor
