= Wedding dress of Sarah Ferguson =

Dress worn by Sarah Ferguson at her wedding to Prince Andrew in 1986

- Artist: Lindka Cierach
- Year: 1986

Sarah Ferguson wore a dress made from ivory duchesse satin and featuring heavy beading for her wedding to Prince Andrew, Duke of York (second son of Queen Elizabeth II) on 23 July 1986 at Westminster Abbey. Designed by Lindka Cierach, the beadwork incorporated various symbols including hearts representing romance, anchors and waves representing Prince Andrew's sailing background and bumblebees and thistles, which were taken from Sarah Ferguson's family heraldry. Copies of the dress, including the motifs specific to the royal family, went on sale in stores just hours after the end of the wedding. Influenced by the wedding dress of Lady Diana Spencer, a notable feature of Sarah Ferguson's 17-foot (5.2 m) long train was the intertwined initials A and S sewn in silver beads. The headdress and bouquet, fabric rosettes or artificial silk flowers were used to adorn the gown itself. Ferguson was pleased with the dress, describing it in her 1997 memoir, My Story, as "an exquisite creation I'd lost twenty-six pounds to fit into. Lindka was a genius; I knew she could make the most flattering gown ever, and she had. It was amazingly boned, like a corset." Hairstylist Denise McAdam and make-up artist Teresa Fairminer attended to the bride, while florist Jane Packer designed the bouquet. The ivory silk wedding dress became the season's most sought-after style.

== See also ==
- List of individual dresses
