= Simon Lalor =

British businessman and Territorial Army officer

Major General Simon Lalor CB TD VR
- Born: Simon Francis Neil Lalor; 1956 (age 69–70)
- Military career
- Allegiance: United Kingdom
- Branch: British Army
- Service years: 1976–2010
- Rank: Major General
- Service number: 501631
- Units: Queen's Regiment; Honourable Artillery Company
- Commands: Assistant Chief of the Defence Staff
- Conflicts: Operation Banner
- Awards: Companion of the Order of the Bath (CB)

Major General Simon Francis Neil Lalor, CB, TD, VR (born 1956) is a British businessman. As a Territorial Army officer, he served as Assistant Chief of the Defence Staff (Reserves and Cadets) from 2007 to 2010.

== Military service ==
Lalor was commissioned as a second lieutenant in the Queen's Regiment on 6 March 1976. On 6 March 1978, he was promoted to lieutenant. On 2 September 1978, he was transferred to the Regular Army Reserve of Officers thereby ending his active, full-time service.

On 3 February 1979, he transferred to the Honourable Artillery Company. He retained the rank of lieutenant and given seniority in that rank from 6 August 1978. He was promoted to captain on 16 April 1984 and to major on 10 March 1990 which seniority from 1 October 1987. He was promoted to lieutenant colonel on 1 October 1993, and to colonel on 1 July 1996. He was promoted to brigadier on 31 October 2002.

On 1 March 2007, he was promoted to major general and appointed Assistant Chief of the Defence Staff.

== Career ==
In 1998, he became a director of Britam Defence Limited.

== Honours ==
In August 1991, Lalor was awarded the Efficiency Decoration (Territorial) and the associated post-nominal letters TD. In April 2002, he was awarded the Volunteer Reserves Service Medal. In the 2010 New Year Honours, he was appointed Companion of the Order of the Bath (CB).

Ribbon	Award	Details
	Order of the Bath (CB)	Companion; Awarded in 2010
	General Service Medal	With "NORTHERN IRELAND" Clasp
	Queen Elizabeth II Golden Jubilee Medal	
	Efficiency Decoration (Territorial) (TD)	HAC ribbon
	Volunteer Reserves Service Medal (VR)	HAC ribbon

He was appointed Honorary Colonel of The Honourable Artillery Company on 1 October 1996. His tenure ended on 1 July 1999. On 1 May 2010, he was appointed Honorary Colonel Commandant of the Royal Regiment of Artillery.

Military offices
Preceded by The Duke of Westminster	Assistant Chief of the Defence Staff; 2007–2010	Succeeded by Greg Smith
