= Duchesse =

Heavy and rich variety of satin cloth

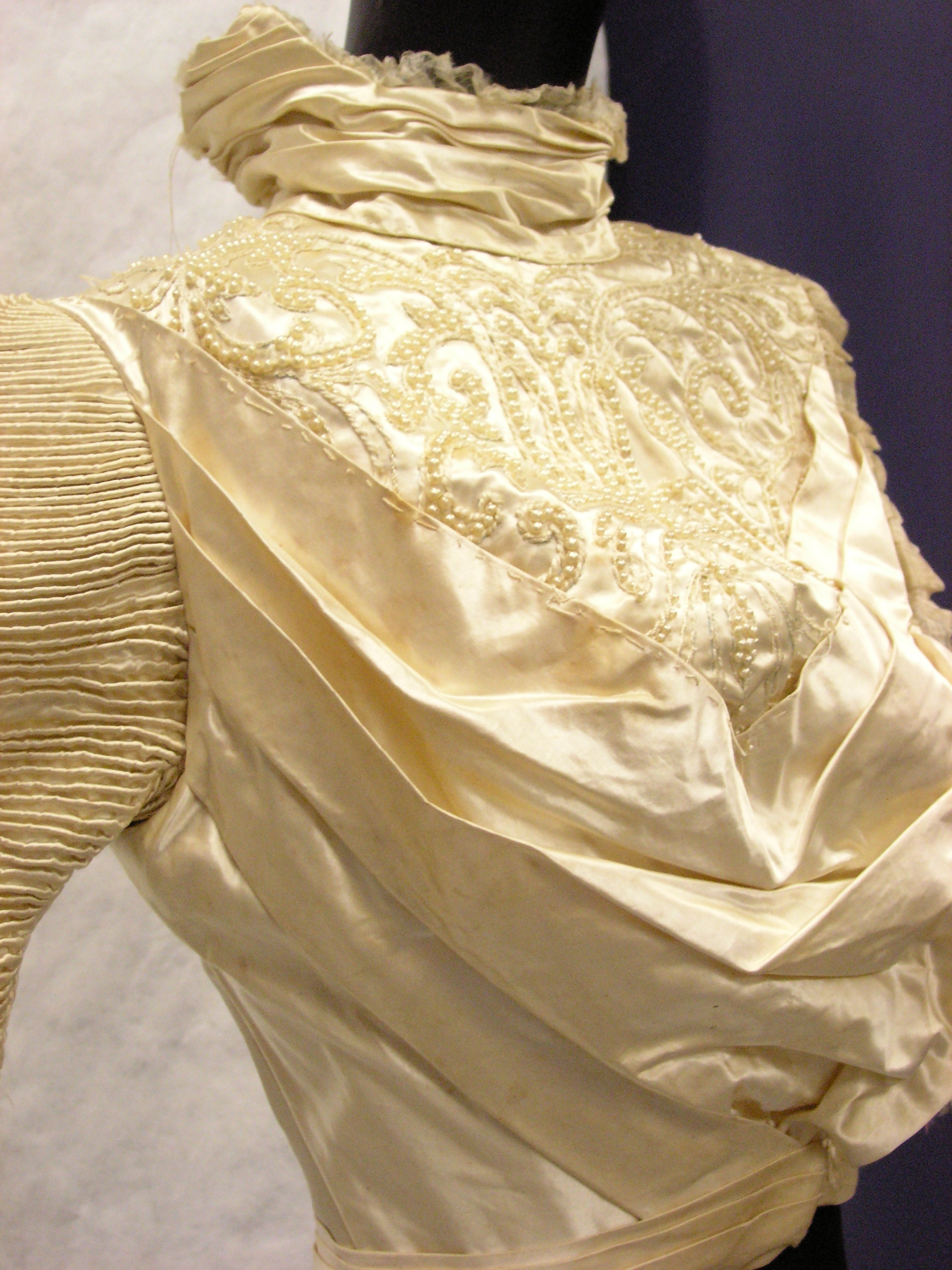
Wedding dress from 1895 made of Duchesse.

Duchesse also called Duchesse satin is a soft, heavy, and glossy satin cloth made in France.

== Weave ==
Duchesse was produced with a satin weave with fine silk threads using a higher number of threads per square inch in the warp with at least seven floating yarns. The actual material was silk only but increasingly made with synthetic fibers also.

== Uses ==
Duchesse satin is valued for its richness and heavy weight. It is used mainly for bridal gowns. The dress worn by Sarah Ferguson for her wedding to Prince Andrew, Duke of York on 23 July 1986 at Westminster Abbey, was made from ivory duchesse satin and featured heavy beading. The gown worn by Queen Silvia of Sweden for her marriage with Carl XVI Gustaf in 1976 was also made of duchesse satin.
