= The Grand Knockout Tournament =

1987 It's a Knockout charity special featuring members of the British royal family

- Also known as: It's a Royal Knockout
- Genre: Game show, charity
- Created by: Prince Edward
- Based on: It's a Knockout
- Presented by: Stuart Hall; Les Dawson; Su Pollard
- Judges: Duke of Abercorn; Duke of Westminster; Duke of Gloucester; Duke of Roxburghe
- Narrated by: Hal Linden (US telecast)
- Country of origin: United Kingdom
- Original language: English
- No. of episodes: 1

Production
- Production locations: Alton Towers, Staffordshire, UK

Original release
- Network: BBC1
- Release: 19 June 1987

Related
- It's a Charity Knockout! (1988)

The Grand Knockout Tournament (also known as It's a Royal Knockout) was a one-off charity event which took place on 15 June 1987, and was shown on British television on 19 June 1987 (BBC1, repeated on 27 December 1987), in addition to airing on American TV via the USA Network on 12 August 1987, and European satellite channel Superchannel on 6 March 1988 (repeated on Christmas Day 1988).

The event was staged on the lakeside lawn of the Alton Towers stately home and theme park in Staffordshire. It followed the format of It's a Knockout (the British version of Jeux sans frontières), a slapstick TV game show which was broadcast in the UK until 1982. The show featured members of the British royal family alongside various sporting and showbiz celebrities. The celebrity participants were drawn from the realms of music, sport, television, comedy and film.

Although regarded as a failure, a similar show without royal involvement was made the following year at Walt Disney World in Florida, featuring teams of celebrities representing the United Kingdom, USA and Australia.

== Synopsis ==
The show was conceived and organised by Prince Edward, who had been keen to develop a career in TV and theatre after he left the Royal Marines. The show featured Prince Edward, the Princess Royal and the Duke and Duchess of York as non-participating team captains, each of whom supported a different charity.

The show was hosted by Stuart Hall, Les Dawson and Su Pollard, with Hal Linden providing commentary for the U.S. telecast. Paul Daniels and Geoff Capes were timekeepers. Aled Jones, Rowan Atkinson and Barbara Windsor were heralds of the tournament. The Duke of Abercorn, the Duke of Westminster, the Duke of Gloucester and the Duke of Roxburghe acted as impartial judges for each of the four teams.

Team members and charities
Team	Members	Charity
Team One (Prince Edward's team)	Prince Edward; Toyah Willcox; Barry McGuigan; Christopher Reeve; Steve Cram; Tessa Sanderson; Sarah Hardcastle; John Cleese; Michael Ball; Nicholas Lyndhurst; Dame Kiri Te Kanawa; Duncan Goodhew; Sharon McPeake	Duke of Edinburgh's Award
Team Two (The Princess Royal's team)	Anne, Princess Royal; Debbie Flintoff; Cliff Richard; Emlyn Hughes; Jenny Agutter; Kevin Kline; Jackie Stewart; Eddy Grant; Bill Wyman; Peter Blake; Walter Payton; Virginia Leng; Sunil Gavaskar; Anthony Andrews; Tom Jones; Sheena Easton	Save the Children
Team Three (The Duke of York's team)	Prince Andrew, Duke of York; Judy Simpson; Anneka Rice; Fiona Fullerton; Gary Lineker; George Lazenby; Michael Palin; Nigel Mansell; John Travolta; Griff Rhys Jones; Margot Kidder; Steve Podborski	World Wildlife Fund
Team Four (The Duchess of York's team)	Sarah, Duchess of York; Meat Loaf; Pamela Stephenson; Brian Cooper (dog-sledder); Mel Smith; Jane Seymour; Chris de Burgh; Viv Richards; Michael Brandon; Sir John Mills	International Year of Shelter for the Homeless, 1987

== Aftermath ==
Immediately after the event, Prince Edward asked the assembled journalists, "Well, what did you think?" The journalists, unbeknownst to Prince Edward, had not seen the event properly, as they had been kept confined in the press tent, separate from the celebrities and members of the royal family who had taken part, and were underwhelmed and unhappy at such an arrangement. They responded with nervous laughter and Prince Edward stormed out of the press conference, sarcastically thanking the journalists for their enthusiasm.

Reportedly the Queen disapproved of the event and all of her courtiers had advised against it. Neither she, the Duke of Edinburgh nor the Prince and Princess of Wales agreed to take part, but Edward persevered and the project went to completion. Nonetheless, the event drew an audience of 18 million domestically, making it the fourth most-watched programme of the year. It was later watched by 400 million viewers worldwide and raised more than £1.5 million for the respective charities.

In a 2023 retrospective, game show writer Ian Weaver argued that, while the show was unremarkable, it had been unfairly maligned at the time and in popular memory.
