= Guy Innes-Ker, 10th Duke of Roxburghe =

British aristocrat (1954–2019)

His Grace The Duke of Roxburghe
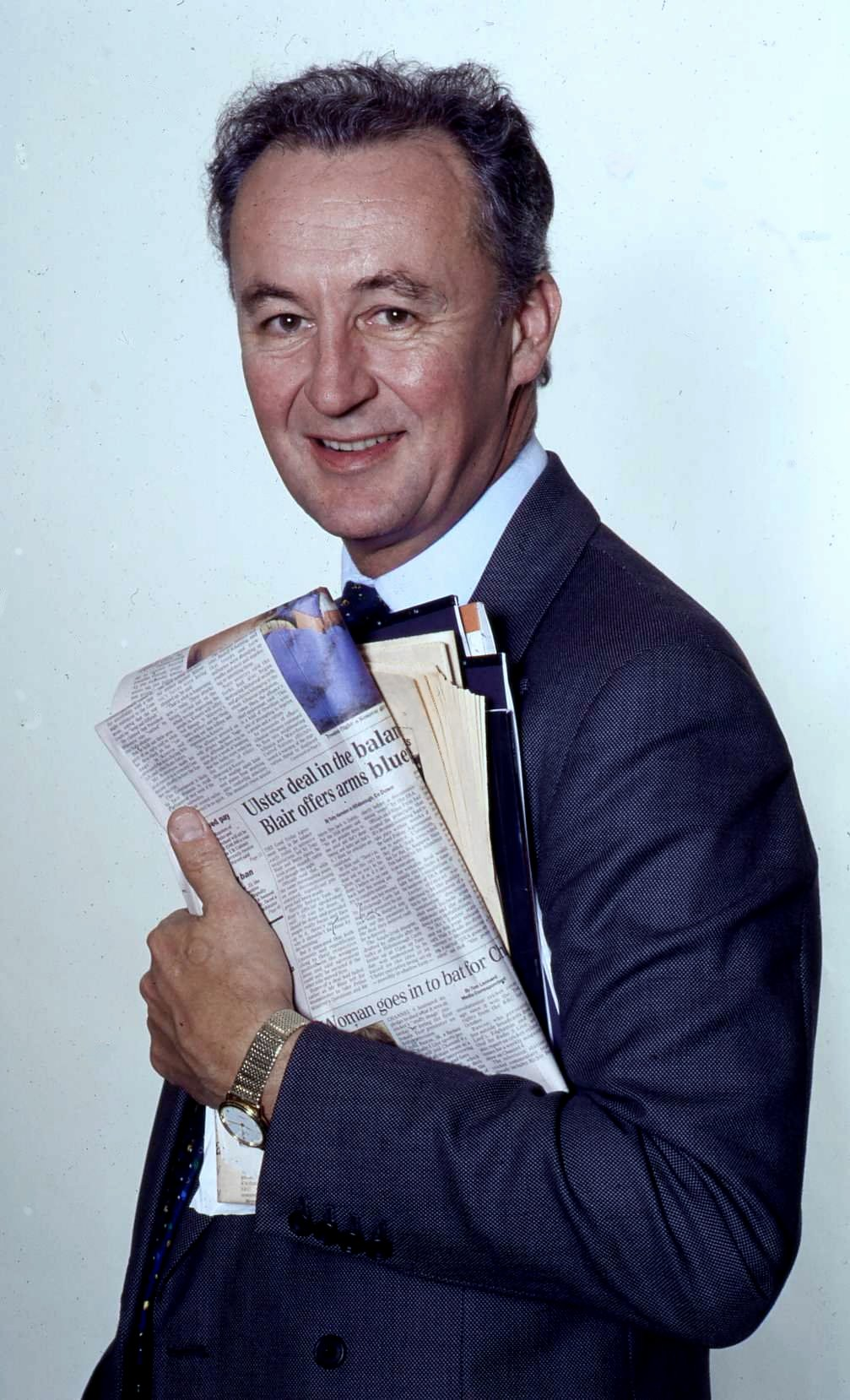
- Portrait by Allan Warren
- Preceded by: George Innes-Ker, 9th Duke of Roxburghe
- Succeeded by: Charles Innes-Ker, 11th Duke of Roxburghe

Personal details
- Born: Guy David Innes-Ker; 18 November 1954
- Died: 29 August 2019 (aged 64) Floors Castle, Kelso, Roxburghshire, Scotland
- Spouses: Lady Jane Meriel Grosvenor (m. 1977; div. 1990) Virginia Mary Wynn-Williams (m. 1992)
- Children: 5, including Charles Innes-Ker, 11th Duke of Roxburghe
- Parent(s): George Innes-Ker, 9th Duke of Roxburghe; Margaret McConnel
- Education: Eton College; Magdalene College, Cambridge; Royal Military Academy Sandhurst

Military service
- Allegiance: United Kingdom
- Branch/service: British Army
- Rank: Lieutenant
- Unit: Blues and Royals

Guy David Innes-Ker, 10th Duke of Roxburghe (18 November 1954 – 29 August 2019), was a British aristocrat.

== Early life ==
Guy David Innes Ker was born on 18 November 1954, the eldest son of the 9th Duke by his second wife (Margaret) Elisabeth McConnell (1918–1993). The Duke had a younger brother, Lord Robert Innes Ker (born 1959), who is married with one son and one daughter.

He was educated at Eton College, Magdalene College, Cambridge, where he studied Land Economy, and at the Royal Military Academy Sandhurst where he was awarded the Sword of Honour in 1974, in which year he became a Lieutenant in the Blues and Royals. In 1982 he was Troop Leader of 3 Troop, B Squadron, commanding 12 soldiers and deployed on operations to the Falklands War with another troop in four FV101 Scorpion light tanks, four FV107 Scimitar light tanks, and a FV106 Samson armoured recovery vehicle. The Troop landed at San Carlos Water with 40 Commando, and over the course of several battles supported the Marines, 3 Para and the Scots Guards.

== Career ==
He was a Liveryman of the Worshipful Company of Fishmongers and a Freeman of the City of London.

=== Peerage ===
He succeeded his father to the title of Duke of Roxburghe in 1974, also becoming the premier baronet of Scotland, and the 30th feudal baron of Innes.

In 1987, he served as a judge in Prince Edward's charity television special The Grand Knockout Tournament.

His eldest son, Charles, succeeded him as 11th Duke.

== Personal life ==
The Duke was married twice. His first marriage was on 10 September 1977 to Lady Jane Meriel Grosvenor (b. 8 February 1953; Lady Jane Dawnay since 1996), younger daughter of Robert Grosvenor, 5th Duke of Westminster; the couple had two sons and a daughter. They divorced in 1990. Their children are:

- Lady Rosanagh Viola Alexandra Innes Ker (b. 16 January 1979), a bridesmaid at the 1986 wedding of the then Prince Andrew, Duke of York. She married James Walter Grimston, Viscount Grimston (son of John Grimston, 7th Earl of Verulam) in 2008. They have two sons and a daughter.
- Charles Robert George Innes Ker, 11th Duke of Roxburghe (b. 18 February 1981)
- Lord Edward "Ted" Arthur Gerald Innes-Ker (b. 2 February 1984)

The Duke remarried 3 September 1992, interior designer Virginia Mary Wynn-Williams (daughter of David Rudyerd Wynn-Williams and great-granddaughter of novelist Neil Wynn Williams). They had a son and a daughter. Their children are:

- Lady Isabella May Innes-Ker (b. September 1994)
- Lord George Alastair Innes-Ker (b. 20 November 1996)

The Duke lived at Floors Castle, Kelso, Roxburghshire. In December 2009, he was diagnosed with oesophageal cancer and received treatment for the condition in London.

=== Death ===
The Duke died at Floors Castle on 29 August 2019, following a lengthy illness.

Peerage of Scotland
Preceded by George Innes-Ker	Duke of Roxburghe; 1974–2019	Succeeded by Charles Innes-Ker
