= Neal Williams (ecologist) =

American pollination ecologist

- Born: June 12, 1969 (age 57); Madison, Wisconsin, US
- Spouse(s): Dr. Melissa Williams, MD (2000-present)
- Children: Linnea Williams (b. 2004), Lewis Williams (b. 2006)
- Parent(s): Paul Williams, Coe Williams

Academic background
- Education: Madison West High School, University of Edinburgh; BSc, botany and zoology, 1992, University of Wisconsin–Madison; PhD, ecology and evolution, 1999, Stony Brook University
- Thesis: The evolution and ecology of diet specialization in two osmiine bees (1999)

Academic work
- Institutions: University of California, Davis; Bryn Mawr College
- Website: williamslab.ucdavis.edu

Neal Mikkelsen Williams is an American pollination ecologist.

== Early life and education ==
Williams was born and raised in Madison, Wisconsin, where he spent time with his father and brother exploring the vast and beautiful wildlife in and around Madison. He attended West High School in Madison. He studied botany, history, and philosophy of science at the University of Edinburgh in a year abroad, in the process of receiving his Bachelor of Science degrees in botany and zoology from his hometown University of Wisconsin–Madison. He earned a scholarship to UW Madison through WYSO (the Wisconsin youth orchestra organization) for his excellence in Bassoon playing, and continued orchestral and chamber music involvement throughout college. Following this, Williams earned his Ph.D. in ecology and evolution from Stony Brook University in 1999 and then served as the I. W. Killam Foundation Postdoctoral Fellow at the University of Calgary. In 2000 he married Dr. Melissa Williams, MD who is from Kenosha, WI.

== Career ==
Following his doctoral degree and fellowship, Williams accepted a faculty position at Bryn Mawr College. While there, he collaborated with evolutionary biologist Rachael Winfree in looking at bee populations across 23 farms in central New Jersey and Southeastern Pennsylvania. Their findings concluded that native bees alone provided sufficient pollination at 90 percent of the farms. In 2008, Williams' research team used an experimental approach to understand the landscape-scale ecology of native bumblebees by establishing 38 bee colonies across central California. Throughout the summer, they found that the further a colony was from natural areas, the fewer worker bees it sustained. Williams' team also found that bees always collected pollen from both crops and native plants. Therefore, they concluded that a mosaic landscape that has natural areas mixed in with agriculture was important in keeping bee colonies healthy. His overall pollinator conservation research helped form the basis for USDA Natural Resources Conservation Service' planting guidelines to enhance pollinators.

In 2009, Williams left Bryn Mawr to accept an assistant professor position at the University of California, Davis (UC Davis). During his tenure at UC Davis, Williams continued to focus on the ecology and evolution of bees and other pollinator insects. As a result, he was named a Chancellor's Fellow in 2015, a five-year program that granted him $25,000 to support his research, teaching, and public service activities. By 2018, Williams was recognized as a Highly Cited Researcher by Clarivate Analytics. He earned the honor by publishing multiple papers that ranked in the top 1 percent by citations in his field and year, over a 10-year period. Two years later, Williams was selected as a Fellow of the California Academy of Sciences.
