= Glass coach =

Carriage of the British monarchy

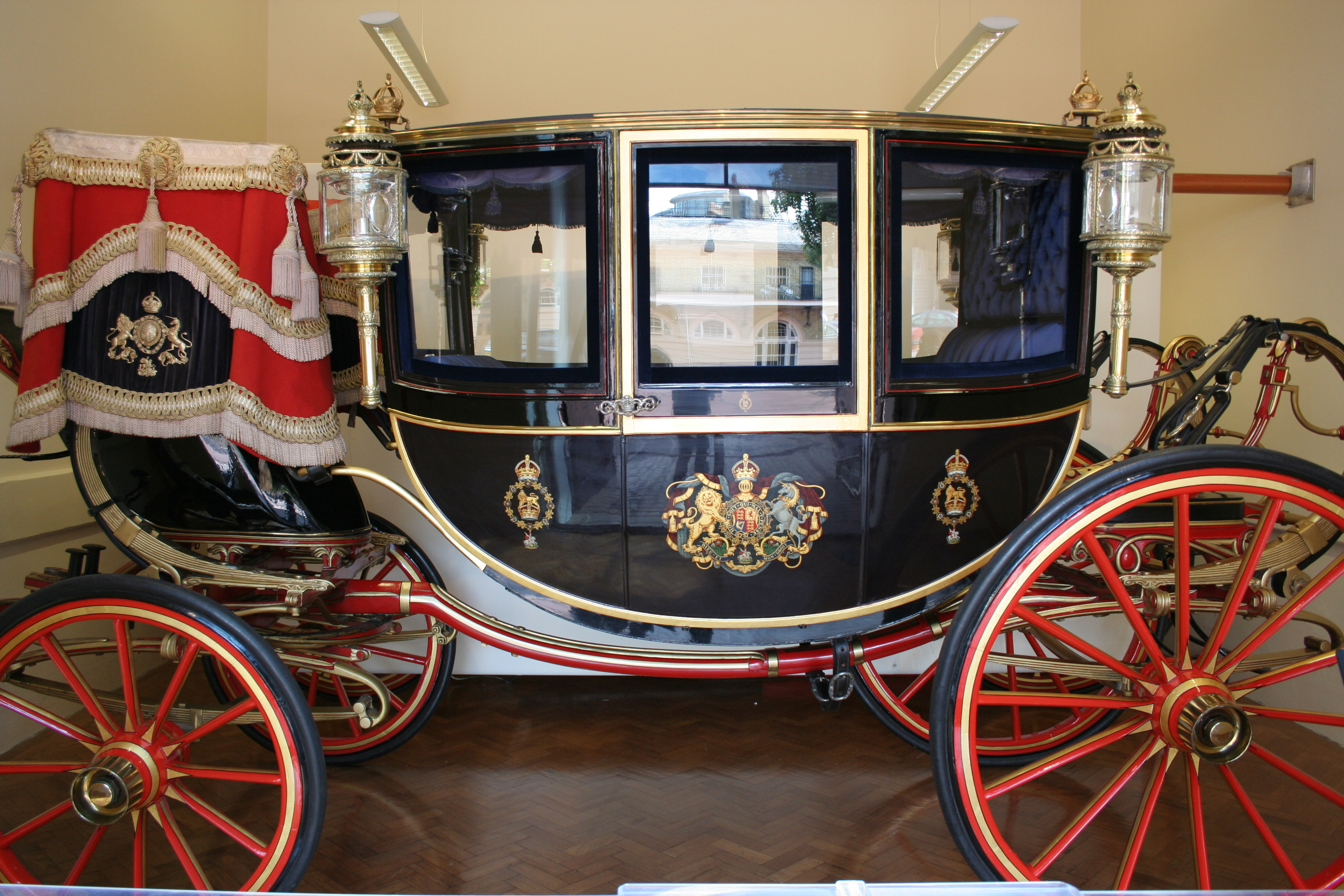
Glass Coach

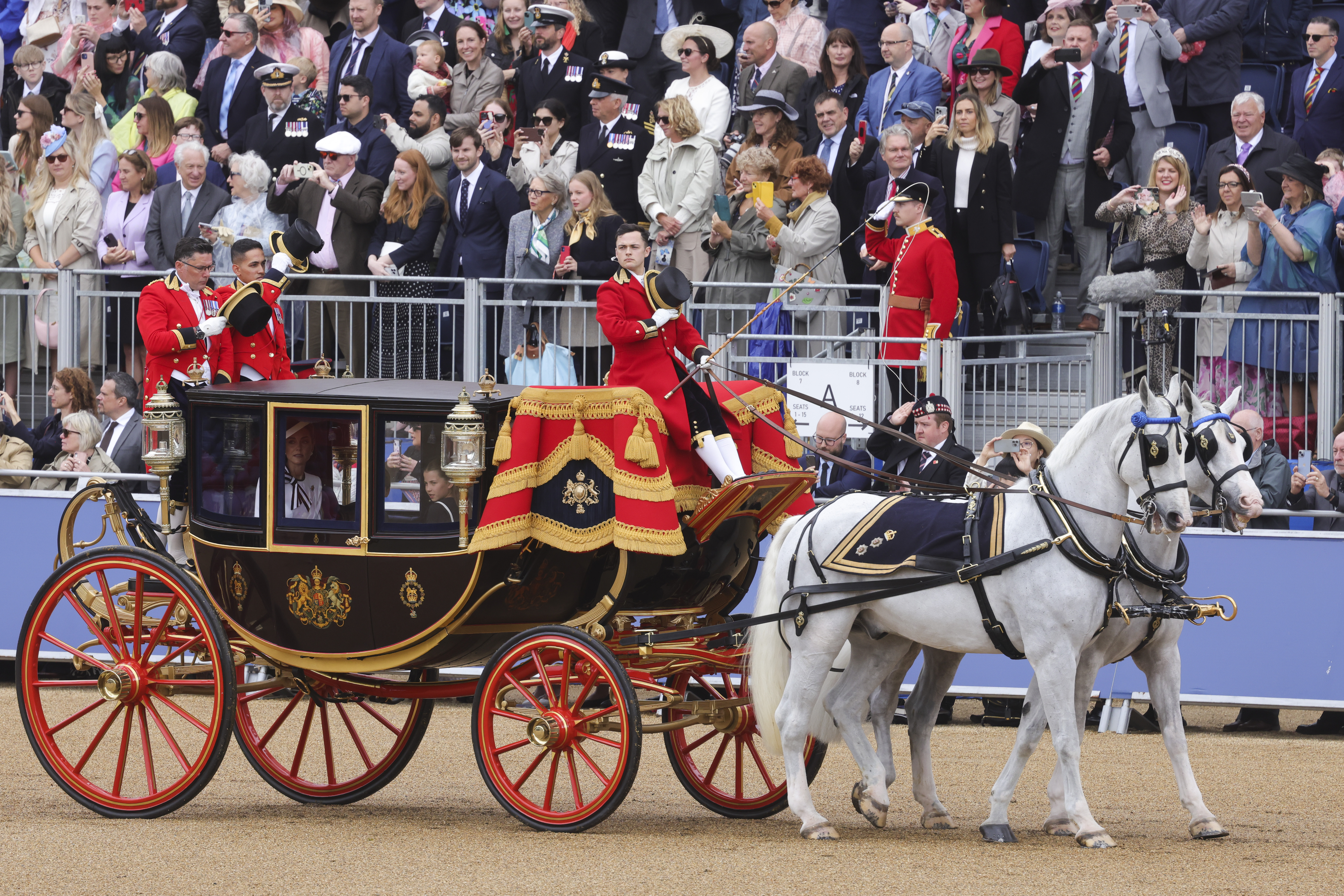
Trooping the Colour, 2024

The Glass Coach is one of the principal State carriages of the British monarch. Built by Peters & Sons of London in 1881, it had originally been designed as a sheriff's coach, but was purchased by the Crown in time for the coronation of George V in 1911.

It is used each year on various state occasions, but has most famously been employed at royal weddings, either to convey the bride-to-be to the church before the service (as was the case with Princess Margaret in 1960 and Lady Diana Spencer in 1981), or to transport the newlywed bride and groom from church after the service (as happened with Princess Elizabeth and the Duke of Edinburgh in 1947). In 2012, it was used to convey Queen Elizabeth II and the Duke of Edinburgh to and from Horse Guards Parade for Trooping the Colour, and in 2024, served that purpose for the Princess of Wales and her children.

The Glass Coach is driven by a coachman and may be pulled by either two or four horses. When not in use it is maintained (and often on public display) at the Royal Mews in London.

== See also ==
- List of state coaches
