= Lindka Cierach =

British couturier and fashion designer

- Born: Lindka Rosalind Wanda Cierach; 28 August 1952 (age 73); Basutoland
- Occupations: Couturier and fashion designer

Lindka Rosalind Wanda Cierach is a British couturier and fashion designer. Notable clients include members of British and European royal families, Helen Mirren, Lady Victoria Hervey and Cherie Blair among others.

== Early life ==
Cierach was born in the British Crown colony of Basutoland (now Lesotho) on 8 June 1952 to Polish-British parents. She spent her early years in Africa. Cierach worked at Vogue for a brief period of time before being educated at the London College of Fashion. She was then apprenticed to Japanese designer Yuki.

== Career ==
Cierach founded her own couture business, Lindka Cierach Couture in 1979. Her first commission was a wedding dress for a Bahraini princess, which enabled her to establish a client base in the Middle East. Cierach entered the global spotlight in 1986, when she designed the wedding dress for Sarah Ferguson's marriage to The Duke of York. Cierach is quoted to have described the designing of the dress thus: "I wanted the Duchess of York's sense of fun and joy to come out in the dress. One day I woke up in the middle of the night and had dreamed it, and that was it". The Daily Telegraph reported: "Everyone, it seemed, could find nothing but praise for her wedding dress for the Duchess of York" .

Cierach continues to dress members of the royal family, including the Princess Royal and the Princess of Wales.

Cierach also appeared in the ITV Series Ladette to Lady in 2006.
