= Neil Wynn Williams =

British writer

- Born: 14 February 1864; Hampstead, London, England
- Died: 1 February 1940 (aged 75); Bedford, England
- Education: Bedford Modern School
- Known for: Author

Neil Wynn Williams (14 February 1864 – 1 February 1940) was a British novelist, writer and contributor of short stories and articles to the periodicals and journals of his time.

== Life ==
Neil Wynn Williams was born in Hampstead on 14 February 1864, the son of William Rudyard Wynn Williams and Elizabeth Blackwell Campbell Williams (née Lambert). He was educated at Bedford Modern School between 1887 and 1891.

Wynn-Williams's initial published works were two volumes of Greek folklore, Tales And Sketches of Modern Greece that was published in 1894 and The Bayonet That Came Home: A Vanity Of Modern Greece that was published in 1896. In 1904 he was asked to contribute to a writer's view of Paris and wrote about the catacombs of the city.

Wynn-William's science fiction novel, The Electric Theft, was first published in 1906. Although critically judged as having ‘little literary merit’, the novel is suggestive of Ian Fleming’s later James Bond novels: the hero, Reginald Burton, discovers that an anarchist, Boleroff, is in command of a vast electrolytic lake under London that he harnesses for his own means, cutting off London's electricity supply. All the while Burton is having an affair with a daughter of a wealthy British capitalist. At the end of the novel, Boleroff accidentally kills himself.

Wynn-Williams died in Bedford on 1 February 1940. He and his brother, Douglas Wynn Williams, had been accomplished oarsmen in their schooldays and endowed a rowing prize for the fastest pair at their old school. Wynn-Williams was survived by his wife, whom he had married in London on 4 September 1903, and three children.

== Selected bibliography ==
- Tales And Sketches of Modern Greece. Published by The Bedford Publishing Co., London, David Nutt, 1894
- The Bayonet That Came Home: A Vanity Of Modern Greece. Published by Edward Arnold, London and New York City, 1896
- Greek Peasant Stories; Or, Gleams And Glooms Of Grecian Colour. Published by Digby, Long & Co., London, 1899
- An Extraordinary Story. Published by George Newnes, Ltd, London, 1899
- Lady Haife. A Novel, Etc.. Published London, 1901
- The Electric Theft. Published by Small, Maynard & Company, Boston, 1906
