= John Lyttelton, 9th Viscount Cobham =

English army officer and politician

The 9th Viscount Cobham KCB, DL
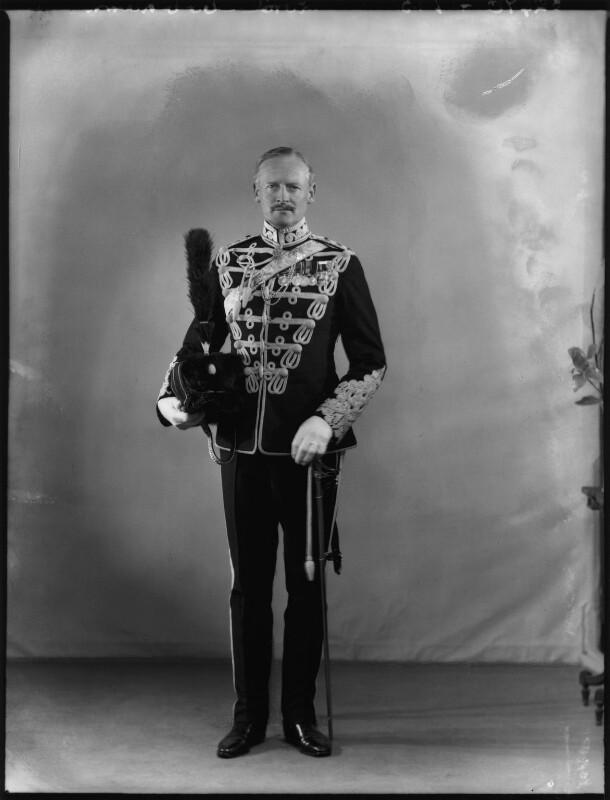
- Lord Cobham, 1934

Under-Secretary of State for War
- In office 1939–1940

Member of Parliament for Droitwich
- In office January 1910 – 1916

Personal details
- Party: Liberal Unionist
- Spouse: Violet Leonard (m. 1908)
- Children: 5, including Charles and Viola, Duchess of Westminster
- Parent: Charles Lyttleton (father)
- Relatives: Lyttelton family The Hon. George Lyttelton (brother); The Revd Hon. Charles Lyttelton (brother); The Rt Hon. Alfred Lyttelton (uncle); Dukes of Buckingham and Chandos
- Education: Eton College
- Military career
- Branch: British Army
- Rank: Lieutenant-Colonel
- Unit: Rifle Brigade
- Wars: Second Boer War; World War I
- Awards: Baronet; KCB; KStJ

John Cavendish Lyttelton, 9th Viscount Cobham (23 October 1881 – 31 July 1949), was a British Army officer, who served as a Member of Parliament then a member of the House of Lords, after succeeding to the Lyttelton family titles.

== Biography ==
Cobham was the eldest son of Charles Lyttelton, 8th Viscount Cobham, and Mary Susan Caroline Cavendish, daughter of William Cavendish, 2nd Baron Chesham. His uncle Alfred Lyttelton was a nephew by marriage of Prime Minister William Ewart Gladstone.

Educated at Eton, like his father and his uncle, Cobham excelled as a cricketer. He played for Worcestershire County Cricket Club in three first-class matches during the 1924–25 seasons. He served as President of the Marylebone Cricket Club in 1935, likewise following his father and uncle.

Styled the Hon. John Lyttelton, he was commissioned into the Rifle Brigade as a second lieutenant on 4 December 1901, serving with the regiment in the Second Boer War in South Africa. He returned home with the SS Kinfauns Castle after the war had ended, departing from Cape Town in early August 1902. After a couple of months on leave, during which there were formal celebrations for attaining his majority, he rejoined the regiment in South Africa in late 1902, but soon returned to Great Britain on the SS Ortona with 900 officers and men of the 4th battalion having been ordered home in January 1903. From 1905 to 1908 he was again back in South Africa as aide-de-camp to the High Commissioner, the Earl of Selborne.

Lyttelton was elected to the House of Commons for Droitwich in the January 1910 general election, a seat he held until his resignation in 1916 (being appointed Steward and Bailiff of the Manor of Northstead). During the First World War he fought at Gallipoli and in Egypt, the Sinai and Palestine, being promoted to lieutenant colonel. He succeeded his father as 9th Viscount Cobham in 1922 and took his seat in the House of Lords. In 1939 Lord Cobham was appointed Under-Secretary of State for War in the Chamberlain war ministry, a position he retained until May 1940. Apart from his political and military career, he also served as Lord Lieutenant of Worcestershire from 1923 to 1949.

== Marriage and children ==
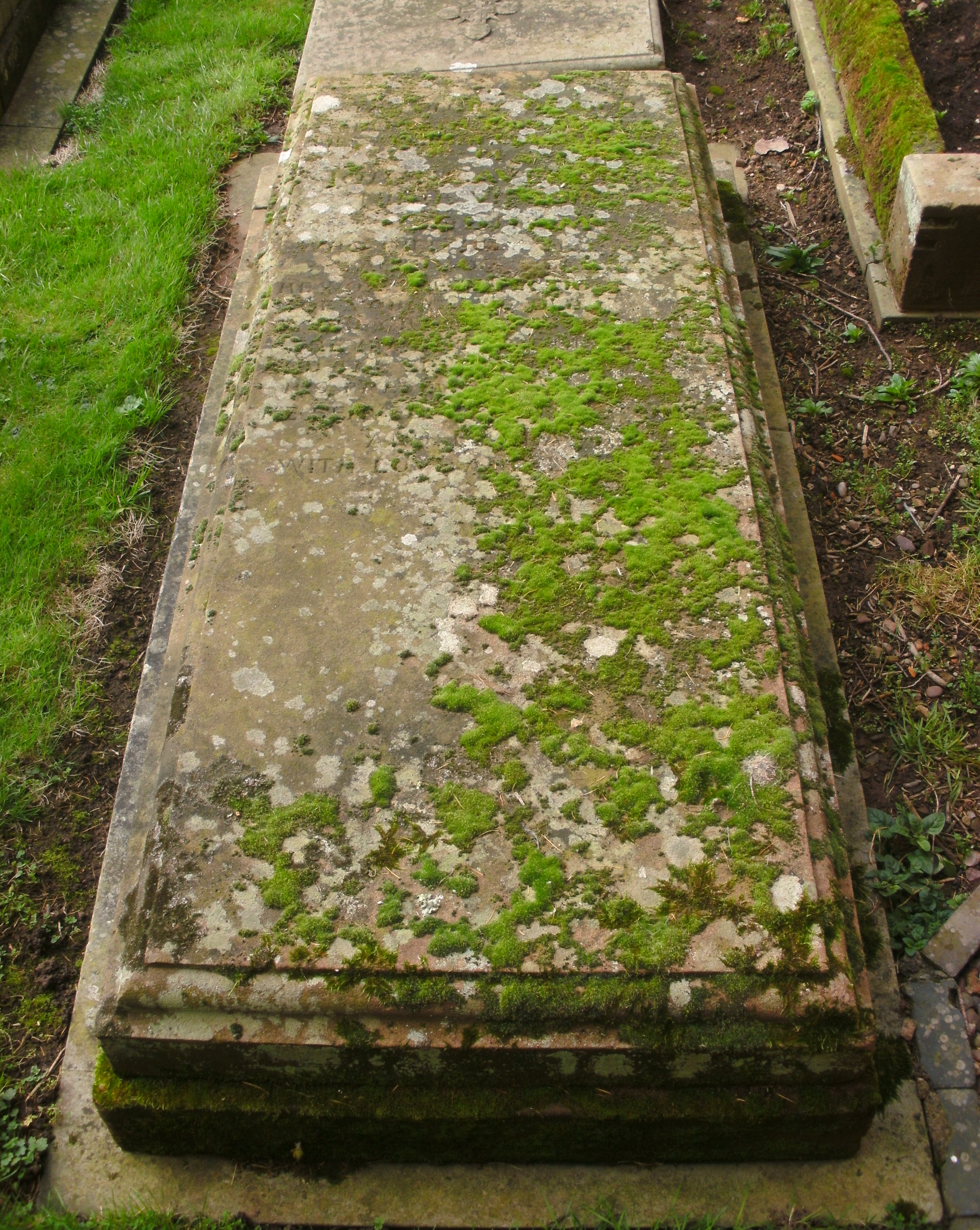
Tombstone of the 9th Viscount Cobham (1881–1949) at St John's Church, Hagley

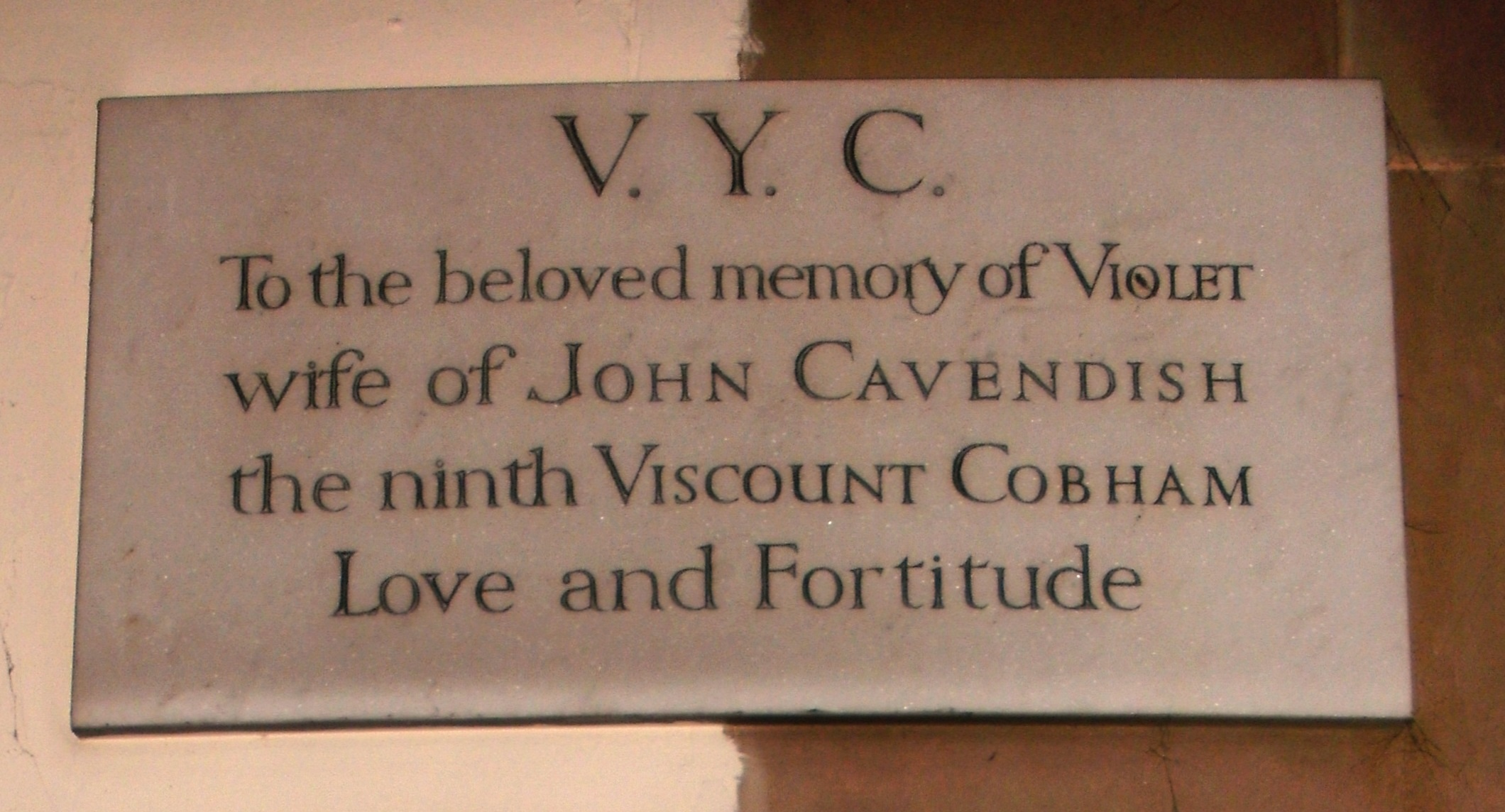
Memorial to Violet, Viscountess Cobham in St John's Church, Hagley

Cobham married Violet, daughter of Charles Leonard, on 30 June 1908. Lord and Lady Cobham had five children together:

- Charles John Lyttelton, 10th Viscount Cobham (8 August 1909 – 20 March 1977)
- The Hon. Meriel Catherine Lyttelton (1 May 1911 – 11 November 1930)
- The Hon Viola Maud Lyttelton (10 June 1912 – 3 May 1987), married Robert Grosvenor, 5th Duke of Westminster
- The Hon. Audrey Lavinia Lyttelton (3 August 1918 – 3 March 2007), married David Edzell Thomas Lindsay (1910–1968)
- The Hon. Lavinia Mary Yolande Lyttelton (21 August 1921 – 4 July 2007), married firstly Captain Cecil Francis Burney Rolt (killed in action 1945), youngest son of the Very Revd Cecil Rolt, and married secondly Major John Edward Dennys MC (1922–1973).

Cobham died on 31 July 1949, aged 67, being succeeded in the family titles by his eldest son Charles, who later served as Governor-General of New Zealand.

== See also ==
- Hagley Hall
- Lyttleton baronets

== Notes ==
- Kidd, Charles; Williamson, David, eds. (1990), Debrett's Peerage and Baronetage, New York: St Martin's Press, p.
- Leigh Rayment's Historical List of MPs – Constituencies beginning with "D" (part 3)
- John Lyttelton, cricinfo.com contains his Wisden obituary from Wisden Cricketers' Almanack

Parliament of the United Kingdom
Preceded by Cecil Harmsworth	Member of Parliament for Droitwich; Jan. 1910–1916	Succeeded by Sir Herbert Whiteley
Political offices
Preceded by The Earl of Munster	Under-Secretary of State for War; 1939–1940	Succeeded by The Lord Croft
Honorary titles
Preceded by The Earl of Coventry	Lord Lieutenant of Worcestershire; 1923–1949	Succeeded by Sir William Tennant
Peerage of the United Kingdom
Preceded by Charles George Lyttelton	Viscount Cobham; 1922–1949	Succeeded by Charles John Lyttelton
