= Blaney =

Coordinates: 54.42540°N 7.75403°W

Blaney: Irish: Bléinigh
- Location within Northern Ireland
- Irish grid reference: H158530
  - Belfast: 146 km (91 mi)
- District: Fermanagh and Omagh
- County: County Fermanagh
- Country: Northern Ireland
- Sovereign state: United Kingdom
- Post town: ENNISKILLEN
- Postcode district: BT93
- Dialling code: 028
- UK Parliament: Fermanagh and South Tyrone
- NI Assembly: Fermanagh and South Tyrone

Blaney (from Irish Bléinigh 'creeks') is a small village and townland in County Fermanagh, Northern Ireland. It lies on the southern shore of Lower Lough Erne, 14 km (8.7 mi) west of Enniskillen. It is situated within Fermanagh and Omagh district.

== History ==
The area takes its name from the Irish word "Bléan" which means a creek. The suggestion that it derives from the Blayneys of Castleblayney originates in an inaccurate statement in Livingstone's History of Fermanagh. Blaney Bay, on Lough Erne was a good location for prospective settlers.

== Places of interest ==
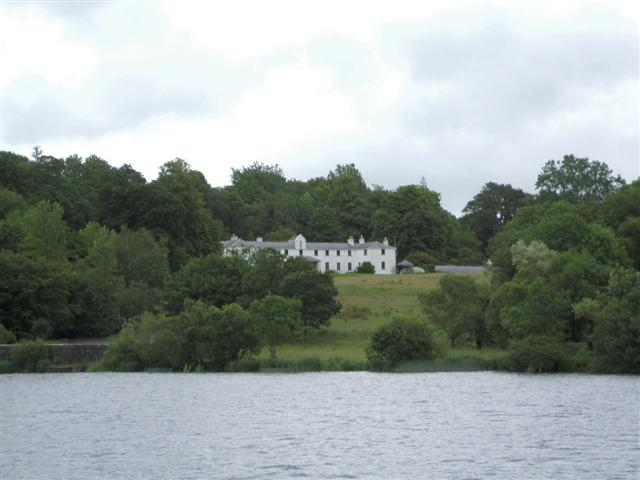
Ely Lodge

One of the children of the 5th Duke was Gerald Grosvenor, 6th Duke of Westminster whose home was here until he went to boarding schools in England. It is now a private residence.

== Sport ==
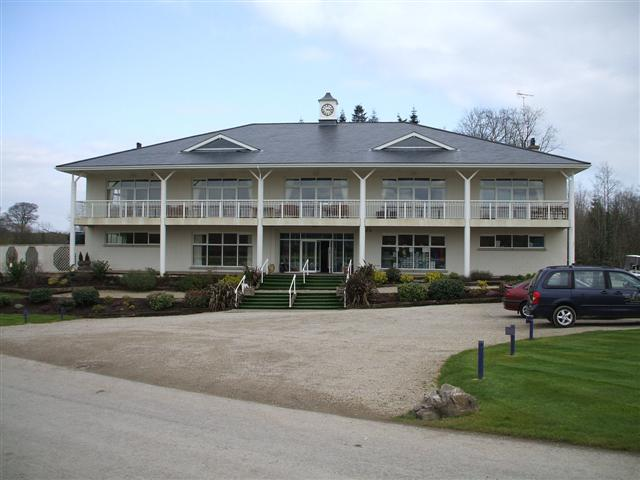
The club house, Castle Hume Golf Club

Castle Hume Golf Club has an 18th-century dovecote in its grounds.

== Public transport ==
Ulsterbus route 99, Belleek - Enniskillen serves Blaney infrequently - once a day each way Mondays to Fridays. Bus Éireann Expressway route 30 passes through Blaney but does not stop.

== See also ==
- List of towns and villages in Northern Ireland
