= George Innes-Ker, 9th Duke of Roxburghe =

British Duke

His Grace The Duke of Roxburghe

Member of the House of Lords
- Lord Temporal
- In office 29 September 1932 – 26 September 1974
- Preceded by: The 8th Duke of Roxburghe
- Succeeded by: The 10th Duke of Roxburghe

Personal details
- Born: George Victor Robert John Innes-Ker; 7 September 1913
- Died: 26 September 1974 (aged 61)
- Spouses: Lady Mary Crewe-Milnes (m. 1935; div. 1953) Margaret McConnel (m. 1954)
- Children: Guy Innes-Ker, 10th Duke of Roxburghe; Lord Robert Innes-Ker
- Parent(s): Henry Innes-Ker, 8th Duke of Roxburghe; Mary Goelet

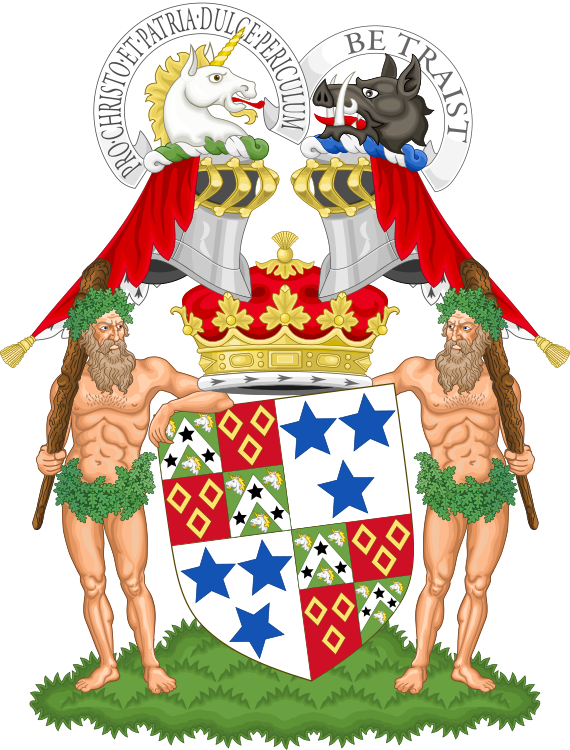
The coat of arms of the duke of Roxburghe

George Victor Robert John Innes-Ker, 9th Duke of Roxburghe (7 September 1913 – 26 September 1974), was the son of Henry Innes-Ker, 8th Duke of Roxburghe, and Mary Innes-Ker, Duchess of Roxburghe (née Goelet). He succeeded his father in 1932.

== Early life ==
George Innes-Ker was born on 7 September 1913 to Henry Innes-Ker, 8th Duke of Roxburghe (1876–1932), and Mary Goelet (1878–1937). He was born almost ten years after his parents were married, on 10 November 1903,

He grew up at Floors Castle which was located on 60,500 acres, which his mother decorated with her own collection of art including a series of 17th century Gobelins Manufactory tapestries.

=== Family ===
His paternal grandparents were James Innes-Ker, 7th Duke of Roxburghe (1839–1892), and Lady Anne Spencer-Churchill (1854–1923), the fourth daughter of John Spencer-Churchill, 7th Duke of Marlborough, who served in Conservative governments as Lord President of the Council and Lord Lieutenant of Ireland, and his wife, Lady Frances Vane, daughter of the 3rd Marquess of Londonderry. His first cousin once removed was Winston Churchill. His uncle, Lord Robert Innes-Ker (1885–1958), married the actress José Collins.

His maternal grandfather was Ogden Goelet (1851–1897), an American real-estate millionaire. At the time of his parents' marriage, his mother was the wealthiest American heiress, with a dowry of twenty million dollars, exceeded only by that of Consuelo Vanderbilt. He also was a grandnephew of Mrs. Cornelius Vanderbilt III, née Grace Wilson.

== Personal life ==
The Duke attended Eton College in Windsor, Berkshire, England.

On 24 October 1935, he was married to Lady Mary Crewe-Milnes (1915–2014), daughter of the 1st Marquess of Crewe by his marriage to Lady Margaret Etrenne Hannah Primrose, daughter of Hannah, Countess of Rosebery, and the 5th Earl of Rosebery. The marriage ended in divorce in 1953, after the Duke controversially attempted to evict Lady Mary from the ancestral home at Floors Castle. When her widowed mother died in 1967, the Duchess inherited West Horsley Place where she died in 2014 at the age of 99.

On 5 January 1954, he married for the second time at Caxton Hall to Margaret Elizabeth McConnel (1918–1993), daughter of Capt. Frederick Bradshaw McConnel and great-granddaughter of British industrialist William McConnel. Together, they had:

- Guy David Innes-Ker, 10th Duke of Roxburghe (18 November 1954 – 29 August 2019)
- Lord Robert Anthony Innes-Ker (b. 28 May 1959); married 1996 Katherine Pelly, and has issue, one son and one daughter. They have separated.

The 9th Duke of Roxburghe died on 26 September 1974.

== Ancestry ==
Ancestors of George Innes-Ker, 9th Duke of Roxburghe

16. James Innes-Ker, 5th Duke of Roxburghe
8. James Innes-Ker, 6th Duke of Roxburghe
17. Harriet Charlewood
4. James Innes-Ker, 7th Duke of Roxburghe
18. Charles Dalbiac
9. Susanna Dalbiac
19. Susanna Dalton
2. Henry Innes-Ker, 8th Duke of Roxburghe
20. George Spencer-Churchill, 6th Duke of Marlborough
10. John Spencer-Churchill, 7th Duke of Marlborough
21. Lady Jane Stewart
5. Lady Anne Spencer-Churchill
22. Charles Vane, 3rd Marquess of Londonderry
11. Lady Frances Vane
23. Lady Frances Vane-Tempest
1. George Innes-Ker, 9th Duke of Roxburghe
24. Peter P. Goelet
12. Robert Goelet Sr.
25. Amy Buchanan
6. Ogden Goelet
26. Jonathan Ogden
13. Sarah Ogden
3. Mary Goelet
28. William Wilson
14. Richard Wilson
7. Mary Wilson
30. Ebenezer Johnston
15. Melissa Johnston
31. Hannah Huff

Peerage of Scotland
Preceded by Henry Innes-Ker	Duke of Roxburghe; 1932–1974; Member of the House of Lords (1932–1974)	Succeeded by Guy Innes-Ker
