= Viscount Eccles =

Title in the Peerage of the United Kingdom

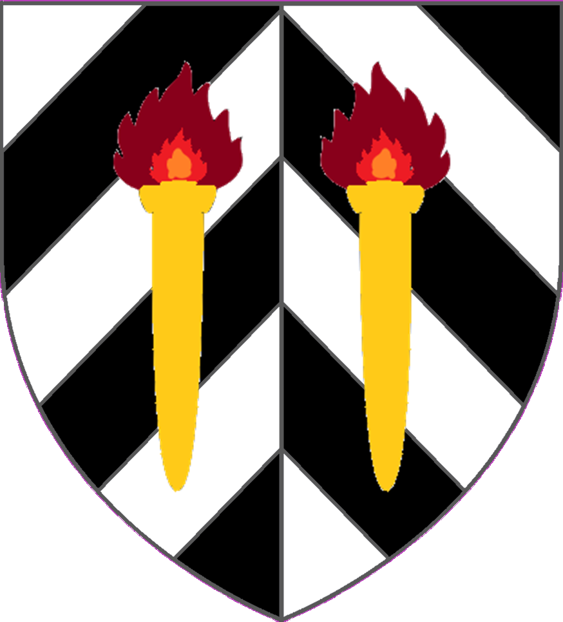
The arms of the Viscounts Eccles

Viscount Eccles, of Chute in the County of Wiltshire, England, is a title in the Peerage of the United Kingdom. It was created on 14 January 1964 for the Conservative politician David Eccles, 1st Baron Eccles. He had already been created Baron Eccles, of Chute in the County of Wiltshire, on 1 August 1962. As of 2017 the titles are held by his son, the second Viscount, who succeeded in 1999. He is one of the ninety elected hereditary peers that remain in the House of Lords after the passing of the House of Lords Act 1999, and sits as a Conservative. His wife Diana Eccles was created a life peer as Baroness Eccles of Moulton, of Moulton in the County of North Yorkshire, on 10 May 1990, making the couple an unusual husband and wife pair both sitting in the House of Lords. Lady Eccles of Moulton also sits on the Conservative benches.

The present Lord Eccles and his family are life tenants of Moulton Hall, Moulton, near Richmond, North Yorkshire, a 17th-century house, the property of the National Trust.

== Barons Eccles (1962) ==
- David McAdam Eccles, 1st Baron Eccles (1904–1999; created Viscount Eccles in 1964)

=== Viscounts Eccles (1964) ===
- David McAdam Eccles, 1st Viscount Eccles (1904–1999)
- John Dawson Eccles, 2nd Viscount Eccles (born 1931)

The heir apparent is the present holder's son, the Hon. William David Eccles (born 1960).
The heir apparent's heir apparent is his son Peter David Eccles (born 1987).

=== Line of succession ===
- David McAdam Eccles, 1st Viscount Eccles (1904–1999)
  - John Dawson Eccles, 2nd Viscount Eccles (born 1931)
    - (1) Hon. William David Eccles (born 1960)
      - (2) Peter David Eccles (born 1987)
      - (3) Thomas Edward Eccles (born 1988)
  - (4) Hon. Simon Dawson Eccles (born 1934)
    - (5) Anthony James Eccles (born 1967)
