= Duchess of Roxburghe =

Duchess of Roxburghe is a title given to the wife of the Duke of Roxburghe. Women who have held the title include:

- Susanna Innes-Ker, Duchess of Roxburghe (née Dalbiac; 1814–1895) (wife of the 6th Duke)
- Anne Innes-Ker, Duchess of Roxburghe (née Spencer-Churchill; 1854–1923) (wife of the 7th Duke)
- Mary Goelet (1878-1937) (wife of the 8th Duke)
- Mary Innes-Ker, Duchess of Roxburghe (née Crewe-Milnes; 1915–2014) (1st wife of the 9th Duke}
- Margaret Innes-Ker, Duchess of Roxburghe (née McConnel; 1918–1983) (2nd wife of the 9th Duke)
- Jane Innes-Ker, Duchess of Roxburghe (née Grosvenor; 1953–) (1st wife of the 10th Duke)
- Virginia Innes-Ker, Duchess of Roxburghe (née Wynn-Williams) (2nd wife of the 10th Duke)
- Annabel Innes-Ker, Duchess of Roxburghe (née Green) (2nd wife of the 11th Duke)
