= James Innes-Ker =

James Innes-Ker may refer to:

- James Innes-Ker, 5th Duke of Roxburghe (1736–1823)
- James Innes-Ker, 6th Duke of Roxburghe (1816–1879)
- James Innes-Ker, 7th Duke of Roxburghe (1839–1892)
