= George Renny =

George Renny may refer to:

- George Renny (VC) (1825–1887)
- George Renny (surgeon) (1757–1848)

== See also ==
- George Rennie (disambiguation)
