= Lady Susan Harriet Grant-Suttie =

Scottish noblewoman, philanthropist and parish councillor

- Born: 13 November 1837
- Died: 16 October 1909 (aged 71)
- Occupation: Parish Councillor

Lady Susan Harriet Grant-Suttie (née Innes Ker; 13 November 1837 – 16 October 1909) was a Scottish noblewoman, philanthropist and parish councillor.

== Biography ==
Grant-Suttie was born on 13 November 1837 in Floors Castle, Kelso, to James Innes-Ker, 6th Duke of Roxburghe and Susanna Innes-Ker, Duchess of Roxburghe. On 6 August 1857, aged 19, she married James Grant-Suttie, son and heir of Sir George Grant-Suttie, 5th Baronet of Balgone and Prestongrange. The couple initially set up home in the Mansion House of Maines in Chirnside, Berwickshire. They had three daughters and two sons.

After the deaths of her father-in-law and husband in quick succession in 1878, her eight-year old son George became the 7th Baronet. Protracted legal complications followed with the inheritance finally being settled at the Court of Session in 1881. She and two of her children took up residence in Prestongrange House in Prestonpans sometime between 1881 and 1891 She very quickly became involved in the affairs of the town, joining the local church, now known as Prestongrange Parish Church, and was actively involved in discussions about and fundraising for the construction of a new town hall for the growing mining town. She was instrumental in establishing a new coffee house and recreational centre for the working men of Prestonpans which opened in July 1887.

The National Portrait Gallery possesses a photo of her and the Royal Collection Trust own a hand-coloured photograph of her with her daughter Victoria who was Queen Victoria's god-daughter.

== Parish councillor ==
In April 1895, Grant-Suttie was elected as a Parish Councillor for Prestonpans' Landward Area. As this was 23 years before the Representation of the People Act of 1918, all electors would have been men. She remained a parish councillor for the rest of her life.

== Death ==
She died at Prestongrange House on 16 October 1909 after a short illness, aged 71. Her funeral took place at Prestonpans Parish Church on 21 October 1909. All Prestonpans shops and businesses were closed from midday as a mark of respect, with residents of the town lining the streets as her funeral cortege passed by. Her body was then conveyed on a special train service to Dunbar where she was buried. In 1911, a plaque was unveiled to her memory in Prestonpans Parish Church.
