= Susanna Dalbiac =

- Born: Susanna Isabella Dalton
- Died: 25 January 1829
- Spouse: Sir James Charles Dalbiac
- Children: Susanna Innes-Ker, Duchess of Roxburghe
- Parent(s): Lt. Col. John Dalton; Susanna Prescott

Susanna Dalbiac (née Dalton; d. 25 January 1829) was a British woman, who participated in the Peninsular War alongside her husband.

== Early life and family ==
Susanna Isabella Dalton was one of nine children born to Lieutenant-Colonel John Dalton of Sleningford, Yorkshire. Her mother was Susanna Prescott, a daughter of General Robert Prescott. The family saw many of its members undertake military service; besides her father, all five of her brothers would attain rank in the British Army or Royal Navy.

== Marriage ==
In 1805, she married James Charles Dalbiac (1776–1847), then a major serving with the 4th Light Dragoons. They had one daughter.

Her husband's regiment took part in the Peninsular War (1807–1814), joining the conflict in Portugal in April 1809. In 1811 and 1812, James Dalbiac, by now a lieutenant-colonel, took command of the 4th Light Dragoons during several attacks in the absence of his superior officer Lord Edward Somerset. Susanna Dalbiac had accompanied her husband when he left for the Peninsular War, and was with him during the Battle of Salamanca on 22 July 1812, where the two participated in a cavalry charge. The Irish historian William Francis Patrick Napier described Dalbiac in the battle:

"An English lady of a gentle disposition, and possessing a very delicate frame, had braved the dangers and endured the privations of two campaigns … In this battle, forgetful of everything but the strong affection which had so long supported her, she rode deep amidst the enemy's fire, trembling, yet irresistibly impelled forwards by feelings more imperious than terror, more piercing than the fear of death."

After the battle, Dalbiac searched among the wounded for her husband. Dalbiac's involvement in the battle was reported in such contemporary publications as The Strand Magazine. Salamanca was James Dalbiac's final stretch of active service; he returned to England, where after several advancements, he was promoted to major-general on 27 May 1825 and knighted by King William IV in 1831. In 1814, he acquired Moulton Hall in North Yorkshire from Sir Ralph Milbanke, who sold the property to provide a dowry for his daughter's marriage to Lord Byron.

Susanna Dalbiac died on 25 January 1829 at the age of forty-five, and was buried at St. Michael's Church in Kirklington, North Yorkshire. A nearby memorial tablet mentions her participation in the Battle of Salamanca as well as her role as a wife and mother. In 1836, their only child married James Innes-Ker, 6th Duke of Roxburghe. Her widowed husband died in London on 8 December 1847.
