= Moulton Manor =

Building in Moulton, North Yorkshire, England

Coordinates: 54°25′43″N 1°38′21″W

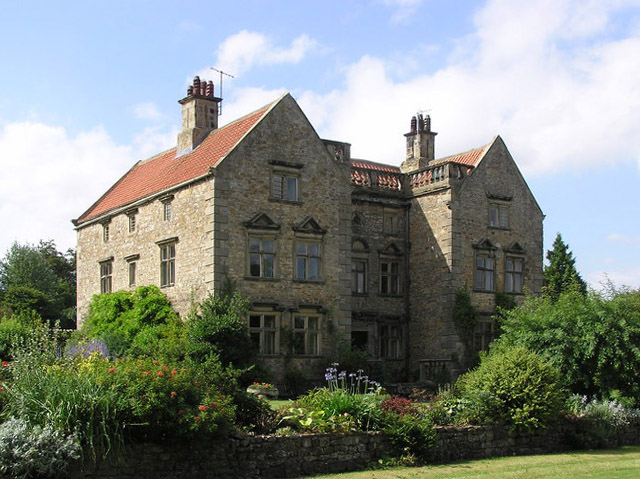
The building, in 2006

Moulton Manor is a historic building in Moulton, North Yorkshire, a village in England.

The manor house was rebuilt in about 1570, and was slightly altered in the 17th century. A local tradition states that James VI and I spent a night in the house. By the early 20th century, it served as a farmhouse, but it was restored, extended and altered in 1938. The building was grade I listed in 1951.

The house is built of stone on plinths, with chamfered rusticated quoins, and pantile roofs with shaped kneelers and stone copings. It has three storeys and a part basement, and an H-shaped plan, with a middle range of three bays, and two-bay gabled cross-wings. Five steps with side parapets lead up to the central doorway with a decorated architrave, a moulded frieze and a stepped hood mould. Most of the windows are cross windows, some with pediments. Above the doorway is a semicircular window with keystones, and above the central range and return is a parapet and a balustrade with pedestals.

Inside the house, the entrance hall has 17th-century panelling and a stone architrave around the fireplace. The room to the left has early panelling, with pilasters between, the capitals of which depict carpenters' tools, and a cornice with frieze below. The kitchen has a large fireplace and chimney, with a possible priest hole. There is a 17th-century staircase with barleytwist balusters, above which is a moulded ceiling. On the first floor is a room with an elaborate fireplace with a frieze above, while all the rooms have early doorways and original fireplaces.

== See also ==
- Grade I listed buildings in North Yorkshire (district)
- Listed buildings in Moulton, North Yorkshire
