= James Pitcairn =

British physician

Sir James Pitcairn (18 July 1776 – 12 January 1859) was a British medical doctor, who became Director-General of the Medical Department for Ireland. He was Chief of the house of Pitcairn, twenty-second in descent.

== Life ==
James Pitcairn was born on 18 July 1776, the eldest son of the Rev Robert Pitcairn, of Brasenose College, Oxford, Vicar of English Combe, Somerset, and Incumbent of Spring Chapel, London.

He graduated MD at Edinburgh, and became house surgeon at St George's Hospital in London. He was gazetted as a Staff Surgeon on 30 August 1799, serving in Ireland, Egypt and Holland. He was knighted by Lord Normandy in 1837 for professional services.

In 1847 Pitcairn was appointed Director-General of the Medical Department for Ireland, successor to George Renny. He held the post until 1852, when he retired with the rank of Inspector of Hospitals.

== Family ==
Pitcairn married on 24 September 1803, at Cheshunt, Harriet, daughter of Charles Dalbiac and his second wife Ann Le Bas. Harriet died of cholera in 1859. He married, secondly, Emma Polocke, and had one son, who died young, and one daughter, Emmeline, who married Mr Rice of the Indian Civil Service.
