= Sun Cottage =

Building in Moulton, North Yorkshire, England

Coordinates: 54°25′45″N 1°38′19″W

Sun Cottage is a historic building in Moulton, North Yorkshire, a village in England.

The building was probably constructed in the 13th century, when it served as the chapel of a cell of the abbey of Bagard in France. All properties of overseas religious groups were dissolved in 1414, but it continued to be used as a chapel until 1586, when it was given by the Crown to John Awbrey and John Radcliffe. It was used for various purposes, and was altered in the late 19th century to serve as a carpenter's workshop. It became dilapidated, and in the 20th century was converted into a house, the work including extensions, and the replacement of all the windows and doors.

The house is built of stone, with quoins and a pantile roof. It has a single storey and four bays. All the openings date from the 20th century. Inside, four medieval roof trusses survive. The building was Grade II listed on 4 February 1969.

== See also ==
- Listed buildings in Moulton, North Yorkshire
