= Henry Innes-Ker, 8th Duke of Roxburghe =

Scottish peer and courtier

His Grace The Duke of Roxburghe KT MVO
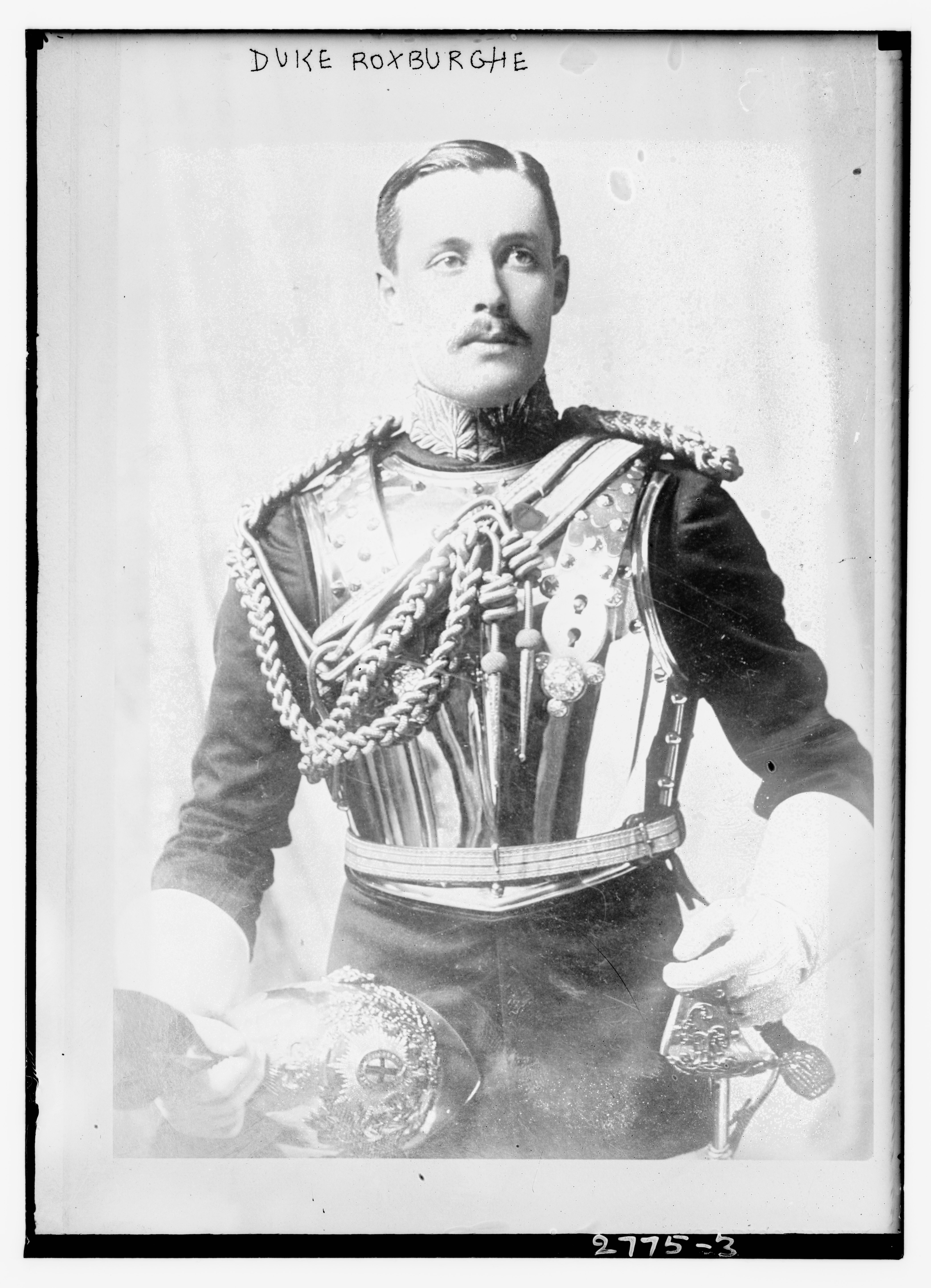

Chancellor of the Order of the Thistle
- In office 1926–1932
- Preceded by: The Duke of Montrose
- Succeeded by: The Earl of Mar

Member of the House of Lords
- Lord Temporal
- In office 23 October 1892 – 29 September 1932
- Preceded by: The 7th Duke of Roxburghe
- Succeeded by: The 9th Duke of Roxburghe

Personal details
- Born: Henry John Innes-Ker; 25 July 1876
- Died: 29 September 1932 (aged 56)
- Spouse: Mary Goelet (m. 1903)
- Children: George Innes-Ker, 9th Duke of Roxburghe
- Parent(s): James Innes-Ker, 7th Duke of Roxburghe; Lady Anne Spencer-Churchill
- Relatives: Winston Churchill (first cousin)
- Education: Royal Military College, Sandhurst
- Alma mater: Eton College

Military service
- Allegiance: United Kingdom of Great Britain and Northern Ireland
- Branch/service: 4th Battalion, Argyll and Sutherland Highlanders
- Rank: 2nd Lieutenant
- Battles/wars: Second Boer War; World War I

Henry John Innes-Ker, 8th Duke of Roxburghe KT MVO (25 July 1876 – 29 September 1932), was a Scottish peer and courtier.

== Early life ==
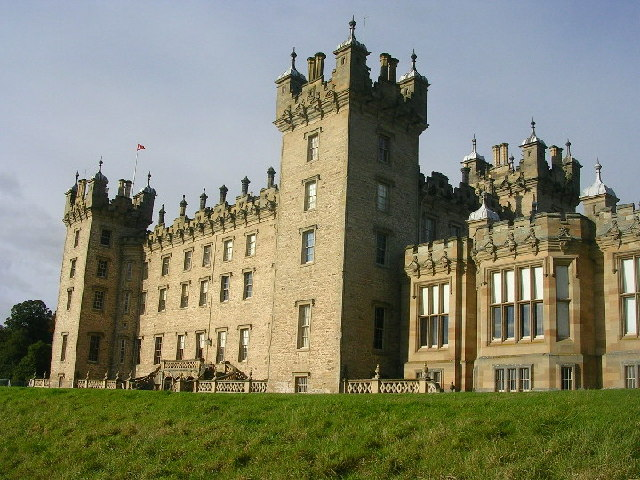
Floors Castle

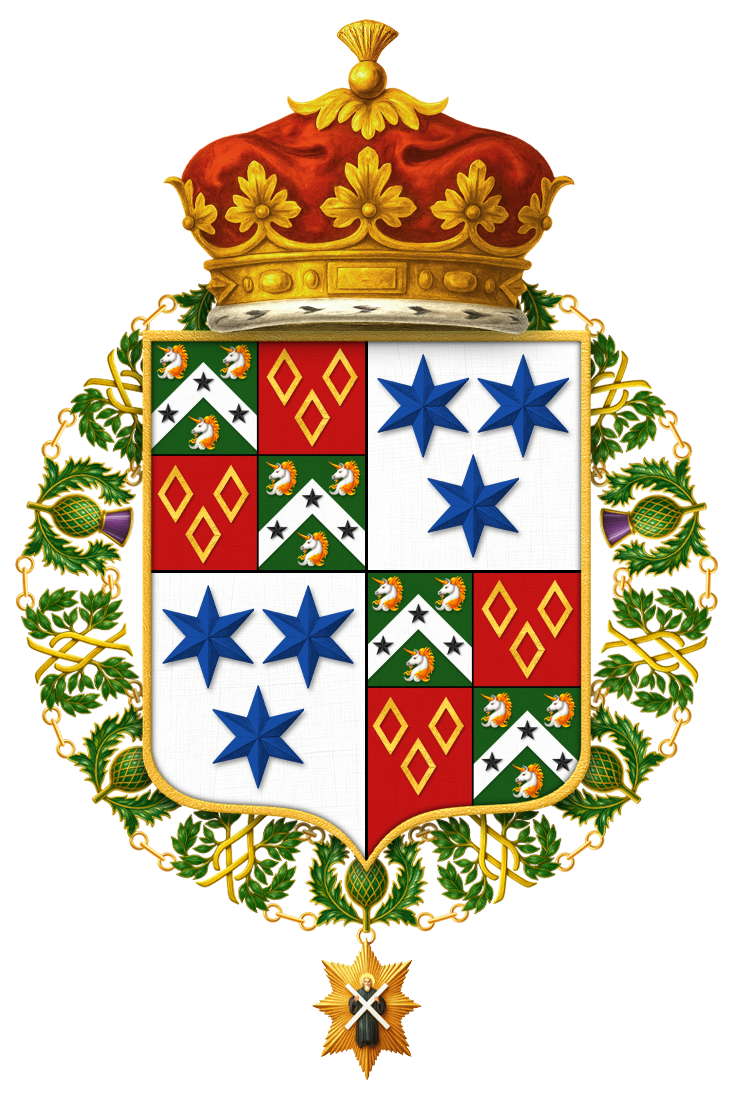
Shield of arms of Henry John Innes-Ker, 8th Duke of Roxburghe, KT, MVO

Henry John Innes-Ker was born on 25 July 1876. He was the son of James Innes-Ker, 7th Duke of Roxburghe (1839–1892) and Lady Anne Spencer-Churchill (1854–1923), the fourth daughter of John Spencer-Churchill, 7th Duke of Marlborough, who served in Conservative governments as Lord President of the Council and Lord Lieutenant of Ireland, and his wife, Lady Frances Vane, daughter of the 3rd Marquess of Londonderry. His first cousin was Winston Churchill. His younger brother, Lord Robert Innes-Ker (1885–1958), married the actress José Collins.

He attended the Royal Military College, Sandhurst, and Eton College.

=== Peerage ===
On 23 October 1892, following his father's death, he succeeded to the titles of 8th Duke of Roxburghe, 8th Marquess of Bowmont and Cessford, 12th Earl of Roxburghe, 8th Earl of Kelso, 3rd Earl Innes, 8th Viscount of Broxmouth, 9th Baronet Innes, 12th Lord Roxburghe, and 12th Lord Ker of Cessford and Cavertoun.

== Career ==
He started his military career as a lieutenant in the Royal Horse Guards. In 1895, he gained the rank of 2nd lieutenant in the service of the 4th Battalion, Argyll and Sutherland Highlanders (Militia). In 1900, he served with the Household Cavalry composite regiment in South Africa during the Second Boer War. In March 1901, he was appointed an Aide-de-camp to the Duke of Cornwall and York during his colonial tour March–October 1901. He later served in World War I, and was severely wounded.

The Duke was appointed a Member of the Royal Victorian Order in February 1901. He was appointed a Knight of the Order of the Thistle (KT) in the 1902 Coronation Honours list published on 26 June 1902, and was invested by King Edward VII at Buckingham Palace on 8 August 1902. He served as Chancellor of the Order of the Thistle from 1926 until his death.

He served as the Lord Lieutenant of Roxburghshire from 1918 until his death. He was appointed a lieutenant of the Royal Company of Archers in 1930.

== Personal life ==
On 10 November 1903, he married Mary Goelet (1878–1937), daughter of the New York real-estate millionaire Ogden Goelet. At the time of their marriage, she was one of the wealthiest American heiresses, with a dowry in the excess of $500,000 and exceeded only by that of Consuelo Vanderbilt. They lived at Floors Castle on 60,500 acres, which Mary decorated with her own collection of art including a series of 17th century Gobelins Manufactory tapestries. Together, they had one child:

- George Victor Robert John Innes-Ker, 9th Duke of Roxburghe (1913–1974), whose sponsor was King George. One of his godparents was Queen Alexandra.

The Duke of Roxburghe died on 29 September 1932 and was succeeded in his titles by his only son, George, who became the 9th Duke of Roxburghe.

Honorary titles
Preceded by The Lord Reay	Lord Lieutenant of Roxburghshire; 1918–1932	Succeeded by The Duke of Buccleuch
Preceded by The Duke of Montrose	Chancellor of the Order of the Thistle; 1926–1932	Succeeded by The Earl of Mar
Peerage of Scotland
Preceded by James Innes-Ker	Duke of Roxburghe; 1892–1932; Member of the House of Lords (1892–1932)	Succeeded by George Innes-Ker
