= Listed buildings in Moulton, North Yorkshire =

Moulton is a civil parish in the county of North Yorkshire, England. It contains eleven listed buildings that are recorded in the National Heritage List for England. Of these, two are listed at Grade I, the highest of the three grades, and the others are at Grade II, the lowest grade. The parish contains the village of Moulton and the surrounding countryside. Most of the listed buildings are houses, cottages and associated structures, and the others include a farmhouse, farm buildings, and two former chapels converted for other uses.

== Key ==
Grade	Criteria
I	Buildings of exceptional interest, sometimes considered to be internationally important
II	Buildings of national importance and special interest

== Buildings ==
Name and location	Photograph	Date	Notes	Grade
Sun Cottage; 54.42913°N 1.63860°W	—	13th century (possible)	A medieval chapel, later a house, in stone, with quoins and a pantile roof. There is a single storey and four bays. All the openings date from the 20th century. Inside, there are four medieval roof trusses.	II
The Manor House; 54.42850°N 1.63926°W		c. 1570	The manor house is in stone on plinths, with chamfered rusticated quoins, and pantile roofs with shaped kneelers and stone copings. There are three storeys and a part basement, and an H-shaped plan, with a middle range of three bays, and two-bay gabled cross-wings. Five steps with side parapets lead up to the central doorway with a decorated architrave, a moulded frieze and a stepped hood mould. Most of the windows are cross windows, some with pediments. Above the doorway is a semicircular window with keystones, and above the central range and return is a parapet and a balustrade with pedestals.	I
Moulton Hall; 54.42616°N 1.63983°W		Early to mid-17th century	A country house in stone with roofs of pantile and Westmorland slate. There are three storeys, a cellar and attics, a rectangular plan with fronts of five and two bays, and a two-storey rear service wing. On the entrance front are three Dutch gables, and two on the left return, all containing an oculus with keystones, and flanked by ball finials. In the centre of the entrance front is a rusticated porch with Tuscan pilasters, a pulvinated frieze and a dentilled cornice, above which is a balustrade with corner pedestals. The windows on the lower two floors are mullioned and transomed, with alternating segmental and triangular pediments.	I
North Cowton Grange; 54.43832°N 1.59341°W	—	Early to mid-17th century	The farmhouse is in stone, with quoins, and an artificial stone slate roof with shaped kneelers and stone coping. There are two storeys and an L-shaped plan, with a front range of two bays, and a projecting wing on the left. The doorway has a chamfered surround and a triangular head, and most of the windows are mullioned, some with hood moulds.	II
Gate piers, Moulton Hall; 54.42655°N 1.63964°W	—	Mid-17th century	The gate piers are in stone, and have chamfered rustication. Each pier has an elaborate capital with an entablature, a moulded frieze, a dentilled cornice, and a ball finial on a moulded base.	II
Manor Bungalow; 54.42895°N 1.63884°W	—	17th century	The cottage is in stone, with quoins and a tile roof. There is a single storey, two bays, and a lower extension at the rear right. In the centre is a doorway with a moulded and shouldered architrave, and the windows are sashes.	II
Gate piers, The Manor House; 54.42874°N 1.63880°W	—	Mid to late 17th century	The gate piers are in sandstone, and are square with banded rustication. Each pier has a capital with a torus architrave, a frieze, a cornice, and a ball finial on shafts supported by four ogee volutes.	II
Barn north of The Manor House; 54.42881°N 1.63893°W	—	Mid-18th century	The barn is in stone, and has a pantile roof with stone slates at the eaves, and raised verges. There are two storeys and five bays. It contains a stable door, a blocked doorway, and slit vents, some blocked. On the roof is a fox weathervane.	II
Spring Cottage; 54.42879°N 1.63831°W	—	Late 18th to early 19th century	The house is in roughcast stone, with some patching in brick, and a pantile roof. There are two storeys, three bays and a rear outshut. The central doorway has a fanlight. There is one fixed light window, the other windows are sashes, and all the openings have wedge lintels.	II
Reading Room; 54.42924°N 1.63837°W	—	1835	A chapel, later used for other purposes, in stone, with quoins and a Welsh slate roof. There is a single storey and two bays. The central doorway has a deep inscribed and dated lintel, and is flanked by shuttered windows.	II
Farm buildings at Moulton Hall Farm; 54.42465°N 1.64549°W	—	c. 1850	The farm buildings are in stone, with quoins, and roofs of pantile and corrugated sheet. They form three ranges with a U-shaped plan. The buildings include a two-storey six-bay barn, single-storey loose boxes, a two-storey five-bay calf house, and a granary.	II
