= Charles Dalbiac =

English Huguenot textile manufacturer and High Sheriff of Berkshire (1726–1808)

Charles Dalbiac (1726–1808) was an English Huguenot textile manufacturer. He was High Sheriff of Berkshire in 1784.

== Life ==
He was son of James D'Albiac, a Huguenot refugee, and younger brother of James Dalbiac (born 1720).

In 1763 James and Charles Dalbiac occupied 20 Spital Square, in eastern London, as manufacturers of silk and velvet. Around 1764 Charles Dalbiac owned Durdans, a house, near Epsom, Surrey. It was rebuilt for him by William Newton, over the years 1764–1768.

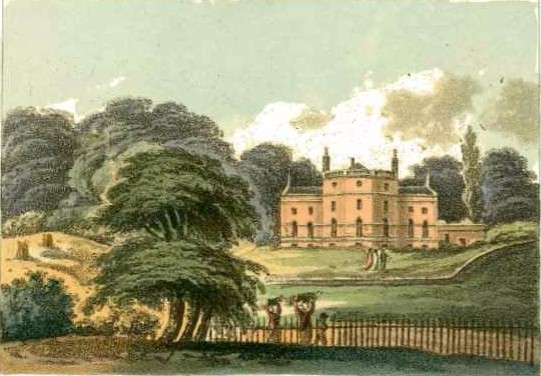
Durdans, Surrey, 1816 engraving

Dalbiac by 1784 acquired Hungerford Park, from a Mr Waters. He had a new mansion built there, in the Italian style. He then sold it, in 1796, to John Willes.

== Family ==
Dalbiac first married Suzanne de Visme. They had two daughters:

- Louisa, or Lucy, married Peter John Luard (father of John Luard).
- Susannah, or Susan.

By his second wife, Ann Le Bas, he had three children:

- Sir Charles Dalbiac (born 1776).
- George.
- Harriet, married Sir James Pitcairn (1776–1859).

Anne Dalbiac, his widow, died in 1819 at age 72.

== Notes ==
Honorary titles
| Preceded by Sir James Patey | High Sheriff of Berkshire; 1784–1785 | Succeeded by Francis Robson |
