= David Eccles, 1st Viscount Eccles =

British politician (1904–1999)

The Right Honourable The Viscount Eccles CH KCVO PC
- Portrait of Eccles by Walter Stoneman, 1953

Paymaster General
- In office 20 June 1970 – 5 June 1973
- Prime Minister: Edward Heath
- Preceded by: Harold Lever
- Succeeded by: Maurice Macmillan

Minister for the Arts
- In office 20 June 1970 – 5 June 1973
- Prime Minister: Edward Heath
- Preceded by: Jennie Lee
- Succeeded by: Norman St John-Stevas

Minister of Education
- In office 14 October 1959 – 13 July 1962
- Prime Minister: Harold Macmillan
- Preceded by: Geoffrey Lloyd
- Succeeded by: Edward Boyle
- In office 18 October 1954 – 13 January 1957
- Prime Minister: Anthony Eden
- Preceded by: Florence Horsbrugh
- Succeeded by: Quintin Hogg

President of the Board of Trade
- In office 13 January 1957 – 14 October 1959
- Prime Minister: Harold Macmillan
- Preceded by: Peter Thorneycroft
- Succeeded by: Reginald Maudling

Minister of Works
- In office 1 November 1951 – 18 October 1954
- Prime Minister: Winston Churchill
- Preceded by: George Brown
- Succeeded by: Nigel Birch

Member of the House of Lords
- Lord Temporal
- Hereditary peerage 13 July 1962 – 24 February 1999
- Succeeded by: The 2nd Viscount Eccles

Member of Parliament for Chippenham
- In office 24 August 1943 – 13 July 1962
- Preceded by: Victor Cazalet
- Succeeded by: Daniel Awdry

Personal details
- Born: David McAdam Eccles; 18 September 1904 London, England
- Died: 24 February 1999 (aged 94) Branchburg, New Jersey, US
- Party: Conservative
- Spouses: Hon. Sybil Dawson (m. 1929; died 1977) Mary Morley Crapo (m. 1984)
- Children: John Eccles, 2nd Viscount Eccles; Hon. Simon Eccles; Selina Petty-FitzMaurice, Marchioness of Lansdowne
- Education: New College, Oxford
- Occupation: Politician, businessman

David McAdam Eccles, 1st Viscount Eccles CH KCVO PC (18 September 1904 – 24 February 1999), was an English Conservative politician and businessman.

== Background ==
Eccles was born in London. He was educated at Winchester College and New College, Oxford, where he obtained a second-class degree in PPE. He worked with the Central Mining Corporation in London and Johannesburg. During the Second World War he worked for the Ministry of Economic Warfare from 1939 to 1940 and for the Ministry of Production from 1942 to 1943 and was Economic Adviser to the British ambassadors at Lisbon and Madrid from 1940 to 1942.

== Political career ==
Eccles was elected as Member of Parliament (MP) for Chippenham in a wartime by-election in 1943, a seat he held until 1962. He served in the Conservative administrations of Churchill, Eden and Macmillan respectively as Minister of Works from 1951 to 1954 (in which position he helped organise the 1953 Coronation and was appointed KCVO), as Minister of Education from 1954 to 1957 and again from 1959 to 1962 and as President of the Board of Trade from 1957 to 1959. Eccles was also President of the Board of Trade in January 1957.

In 1962 he was raised to the peerage as Baron Eccles, of Chute in the County of Wiltshire, and in 1964 he was created Viscount Eccles, of Chute in the County of Wiltshire. Lord Eccles returned to the government in 1970 when Edward Heath appointed him Paymaster General and Minister for the Arts, a post he held until 1973. As Minister for the Arts he clashed with the Chairman of the Arts Council of Great Britain Arnold Goodman over the funding of controversial plays and exhibitions and introduced mandatory admission charges at public museums and galleries. Lord Eccles was made a Doctor of Science (DSc) in 1966 by Loughborough University. He also received an Honorary Science Doctorate from the University of Bath in 1972.

== Personal life ==
Eccles married, firstly, the Hon. Sybil Frances Dawson (1904–1977), daughter of Bertrand Dawson, 1st Viscount Dawson of Penn, on 1 October 1929. They had three children:

- The Hon. John Dawson Eccles; later 2nd Viscount Eccles (born 1931).
- The Hon. Simon Dawson Eccles (born 1934).
- The Hon. Selina Eccles (born 1937); m. firstly Robin Andrew Duthac Carnegie (grandson of Charles Carnegie, 10th Earl of Southesk); m. secondly George Petty-FitzMaurice, 8th Marquess of Lansdowne; became The Marchioness of Lansdowne.

A collection of the couple's wartime letters were published under the title By Safe Hand: Letters of Sybil & David Eccles 1939-42 (Bodley Head, 1983).

Widowed in 1977, he married again, this time to book collector and philanthropist Mary Morley Crapo Hyde (1912–2003) on 26 September 1984. In his later years, he lived in Montagu Square, London, and his wife's home at Four Oaks Farm, in Branchburg, New Jersey, United States; he died there on 24 February 1999, at the age of 94. He left an estate of approximately £2.4 million.

== Styles and honours ==
- Mr David Eccles (1904–1943)
- Mr David Eccles MP (1943–1953)
- Sir David Eccles KCVO MP (1953–1962)
- The Rt. Hon. The Lord Eccles KCVO PC (1962–1964)
- The Rt. Hon. The Viscount Eccles KCVO PC (1964–1984)
- The Rt. Hon. The Viscount Eccles CH KCVO PC (1984–1999)

Coat of arms of David Eccles, 1st Viscount Eccles
| Crest A three-masted Ship sails furled pennons and flags flying Or between two Wings addorsed Sable Escutcheon Chevronny Argent and Sable per pale counterchanged two Torches erect Or enflamed proper Supporters On either side a Wolf Sable armed and langued Gules gorged with a Plain Collar attached thereto a Chain reflexed over the back and resting the interior hind paw on a Portcullis chained Or Motto Truth and Beauty |

== Notes ==
Parliament of the United Kingdom
| Preceded by Victor Cazalet | Member of Parliament for Chippenham; 1943–1962 | Succeeded by Daniel Awdry |
Political offices
| Preceded by Harold Lever | Paymaster General; 1970–1973 | Succeeded by Maurice Macmillan |
| Preceded by Jennie Lee | Minister for the Arts; 1970–1973 | Succeeded by Norman St John-Stevas |
Peerage of the United Kingdom
| New creation | Viscount Eccles; 1964–1999 | Succeeded by John Dawson Eccles |
| New creation | Baron Eccles; 1962–1999 | Succeeded by John Dawson Eccles |
