= James Innes-Ker, 7th Duke of Roxburghe =

British politician (1839–1892)

His Grace The Duke of Roxburghe
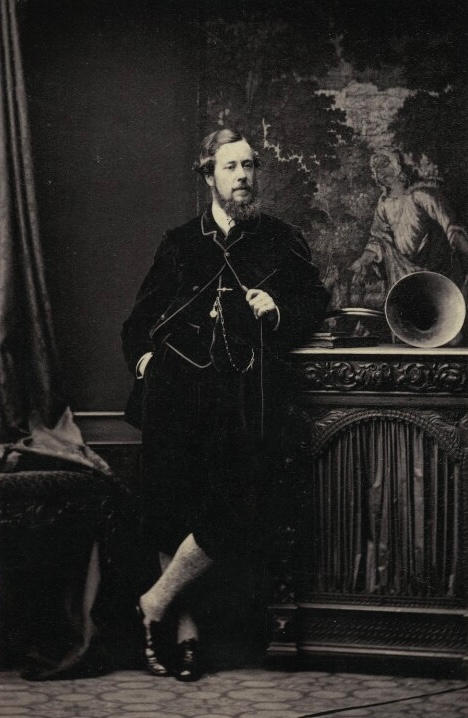
- Photograph of the 7th Duke of Roxburghe, by Camille Silvy

Lord Lieutenant of Roxburghshire
- In office 1884–1892
- Preceded by: The Duke of Buccleuch
- Succeeded by: The Lord Reay

Member of Parliament for Roxburghshire
- In office 1870–1874
- Preceded by: Sir William Scott
- Succeeded by: Sir George Scott-Douglas

Member of the House of Lords
- Lord Temporal
- In office 23 April 1879 – 23 October 1892
- Preceded by: The 6th Duke of Roxburghe
- Succeeded by: The 8th Duke of Roxburghe

Personal details
- Born: James Henry Robert Innes-Ker; 5 September 1839
- Died: 23 October 1892 (aged 53)
- Party: Liberal
- Spouse: Lady Anne Spencer-Churchill (after 1874)
- Relations: Sir Charles Dalbiac (grandfather)
- Parent(s): James Innes-Ker, 6th Duke of Roxburghe; Susanna Dalbiac

James Henry Robert Innes-Ker, 7th Duke of Roxburghe (5 September 1839 – 23 October 1892), became Duke of Roxburghe on the death of his father, James Innes-Ker, 6th Duke of Roxburghe.

== Early life ==
He was born on 5 September 1839 to James Innes-Ker, 6th Duke of Roxburghe, and Susanna Dalbiac, Duchess of Roxburghe, only child of Sir Charles Dalbiac. His mother was one of Queen Victoria's staff until she died in 1895. His elder sister was Lady Susan Harriet Innes-Ker, who married Sir James Suttie, 6th Baronet. His younger siblings were Lady Charlotte Isabella Innes-Ker, wife of George Russell, and Lord Charles John Innes-Ker, who married Blanche Mary Williams (a daughter of Col. Thomas Peers Williams).

== Career ==
He served as a Liberal Member of Parliament for Roxburghshire from 1870 to 1874. He also served as Lord Lieutenant of Roxburghshire from 1884 until his death in 1892.

== Personal life ==
On 11 June 1874 he married Lady Anne Spencer-Churchill. She was the fourth daughter of the 7th Duke of Marlborough and the former Lady Frances Vane-Stewart (eldest daughter of Charles Vane, 3rd Marquess of Londonderry). Together, James and Anne, who served as Mistress of the Robes and Lady of the Bedchamber to Queen Victoria, were the parents of seven children, three sons and four daughters, including:

- Lady Margaret Frances Susan Innes-Ker (1875–1930), who married James Alexander Orr-Ewing (1857–1900) in 1898.
- Henry John Innes-Ker, 8th Duke of Roxburghe (1876–1932), from whose only son all current Innes-Ker males are descended.
- Lady Victoria Alexandrina Innes-Ker (1877–1970), who married Charles Hyde Villiers (1862–1947) in 1901 and had issue.
- Lady Isabel Innes-Ker (1879–1905), who married the Hon. Guy Wilson (1877–1943) in 1904; died in childbirth.
- Lord Alastair Robert Innes-Ker (1880–1936), who married London 10 October 1907 Anne Breese (1885–1959), an American heiress in 1907 and had issue.
- Lady Evelyn Anne Innes-Ker (1882–1958), who married William Fellowes Collins (1865–1948), a grandson of Lord de Ramsey, in 1907 and had issue.
- Lord Robert Edward Innes-Ker (1885–1958), who first married Charlotte Josephine Cooney (1887–1958) (otherwise known as the musical comedy actress José Collins) in 1920. They divorced in 1935. He remarried to Eleanor Marie Woodhead (1887–1958) in 1939; there was no issue by either marriage.

Lord Roxburghe died on 23 October 1892 and was succeeded by his eldest son. His widow, the Dowager Duchess of Roxburghe, died in London in 1923 after a lengthy illness, at the home of her daughter Lady Evelyn and her husband, Colonel William Collins.

He owned 60,000 acres with 50,000 of these in Roxburgh.

== See also ==
- Duke of Roxburghe

Parliament of the United Kingdom
Preceded by Sir William Scott	Member of Parliament for Roxburghshire; 1870–1874	Succeeded by Sir George Scott-Douglas
Honorary titles
Preceded by The Duke of Buccleuch	Lord Lieutenant of Roxburghshire; 1884–1892	Succeeded by The Lord Reay
Peerage of Scotland
Preceded by James Innes-Ker	Duke of Roxburghe; 1879–1892; Member of the House of Lords (1879–1892)	Succeeded by Henry Innes-Ker
