= Margaret Innes-Ker, Duchess of Roxburghe =

British duchess (1918–1983)

Her Grace The Duchess of Roxburghe

Personal details
- Born: Margaret Elisabeth McConnel; 23 December 1918 Coleraine, County Londonderry, Ireland
- Died: 2 June 1983 (aged 64)
- Spouses: Lt.-Col. James Church (m. 19??; div. 1953); George Innes-Ker, 9th Duke of Roxburghe (m. 1954; died 1974) Jocelyn Hambro (m. 1976)
- Children: Guy Innes-Ker, 10th Duke of Roxburghe; Lord Robert Anthony Innes-Ker
- Parents: Frederick Bradshaw McConnel; Frances Elizabeth Pringle

Margaret Elisabeth Innes-Ker, Duchess of Roxburghe (née McConnel; 23 December 1918 – 2 June 1983), later Hambro, was a Scottish activist and noblewoman.

== Early life and background ==
She was born in Coleraine, County Londonderry, Ireland, the daughter of Frederick Bradshaw McConnel, Captain in the Gordon Highlanders, and Frances Elizabeth Pringle. The family later moved to Roxburghshire. William McConnel was her great-grandfather.

== Marriages and issue ==
Sometime before 1953, Margaret married Lt.-Col. James Church; the couple were divorced in December 1953.

On 5 January 1954 at Caxton Hall, Margaret married George Innes-Ker, 9th Duke of Roxburghe. Together, they had:

- Guy David Innes-Ker, 10th Duke of Roxburghe (18 November 1954 – 29 August 2019)
- Lord Robert Anthony Innes-Ker (b. 28 May 1959); married 1996 (separated) Katherine Pelly, and has issue, one son and one daughter.

Lord Roxburghe died in 1974, and their elder son, Guy, succeeded him to the dukedom.

In 1976, Margaret married Jocelyn Hambro, who survived her.

== Work and legacy ==
Margaret served as chairman of the National Society for Cancer Relief from 1964 until her death. She was credited with furthering the level of care in the United Kingdom for people with cancer through her activities and fundraising, including the construction of twelve continuing care homes, and introducing home care nursing services to allow people to receive treatment at home.

After her death in 1983, The Times wrote that her contributions were "even more remarkable when viewed in the light of her continuing struggle against cancer over the past five years."
