= George Rennie =

George Rennie may refer to:

- George Rennie (agriculturalist) (1749–1828), British agriculturalist
- George Rennie (engineer) (1791–1866), British civil engineer
- George Rennie (sculptor) (1802–1860), British sculptor and Member of Parliament
- George Rennie (lacrosse) (1883–1966), Canadian lacrosse player
- George Rennie (Canadian politician) (1866–1930), Conservative member of the Canadian House of Commons
- PS George Rennie, a wreck off the coast of Magnetic Island
