= Moulton Hall =

17th-century manor house in North Yorkshire, England

Coordinates: 54°25′36″N 1°38′23″W

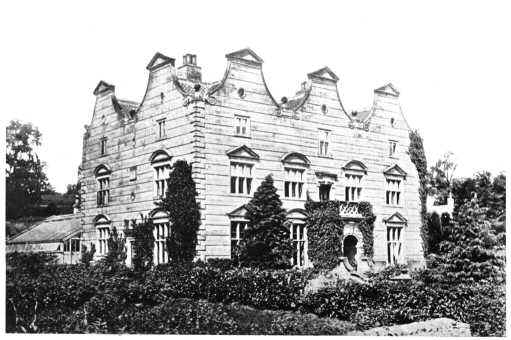
Moulton Hall, archive image

Moulton Hall is a grade I listed 17th-century manor house in Moulton near Richmond, North Yorkshire, England.

The hall is built to a rectangular plan in three storeys with cellar and attics of ashlar and rubble with Westmorland slate roofs. The frontage has five bays surmounted by three unusual curved gables and the sides two bays.

The house is surrounded by approximately 25 acres (10 ha) of grounds.

== History ==
The hall was rebuilt on an ancient site in approximately 1650 for Leonard Smithson, who was succeeded in 1650 by his son Christopher Smithson. The latter's son George Smithson was MP for the North Riding in the First Protectorate Parliament in 1654 and briefly MP for Northallerton in 1659. On his death in 1692 the estate was sold by his widow to Sir Mark Milbanke of Halnaby.

His descendant Sir Ralph Milbanke, 6th Baronet sold it to Colonel Sir James Charles Dalbiac to pay the dowry when Sir Ralph's only daughter Anne Isabella Milbanke disastrously married the poet Lord Byron in 1815. Sir Charles sold it in turn in 1836 to the Sanderson family to provide a dowry for his only daughter, Susanna, who married James Innes-Ker, 6th Duke of Roxburghe that year.

The property was then occupied by members of the Sanderson family for the remainder of the 1800s, including Michael Sanderson, who died in 1850, Matthew Sanderson, who died in 1854, John Sanderson, who died in 1860, Dennison Sanderson (fl. 1863, 1871), Henry Matthew Sanderson (fl. 1890), Henry Middleton Sanderson (fl.1906).

The National Trust acquired the house in 1966 and promotes its "beautiful carved staircase" as its main feature.

== See also ==
- Grade I listed buildings in North Yorkshire (district)
- Listed buildings in Moulton, North Yorkshire
