= Susanna Innes-Ker, Duchess of Roxburghe =

British courtier (1814–1895)

Her Grace The Duchess of Roxburghe VA
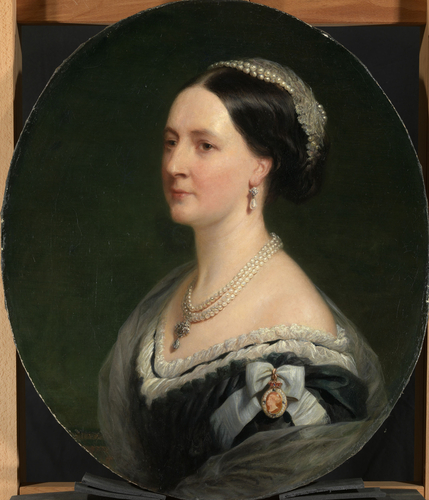
- Oil on canvas by Henry Wyndham Phillips (1868)
- Born: Susanna Stephania Dalbiac; 1814; Yorkshire, England
- Died: 7 May 1895 (aged 80); London, England
- Buried: Bowden, Roxburghshire, Scotland
- Spouse: James Innes-Ker, 6th Duke of Roxburghe (m. 1836; died 1879)
- Issue: Lady Susan Grant-Suttie; James Innes-Ker, 7th Duke of Roxburghe; Lady Charlotte Innes-Ker; Lord Charles Innes-Ker
- Parents: Sir James Charles Dalbiac; Susanna Dalton

Susanna Innes-Ker, Duchess of Roxburghe VA (née Dalbiac; 1814 – 7 May 1895) was a friend and Lady of the Bedchamber to Queen Victoria. Born into a military family, she married the 6th Duke of Roxburghe in 1836. Innes-Ker was one of Victoria's longest serving ladies-in-waiting, holding the appointment from 1865 until her death.

== Early life and family ==
Born in 1814, Susanna Stephania Dalbiac was the only child of James Charles Dalbiac – then a colonel in the British Army – by his wife Susanna Dalton, a daughter of Lt Col John Dalton. Her father had a distinguished career serving with the 4th Light Dragoons during the Peninsular War, but ended active military service after the Battle of Salamanca (1812) and returned to England, where he was knighted by King William IV in 1831.

== Marriage and issue ==
On 29 December 1836 Susanna married James Innes-Ker, 6th Duke of Roxburghe. To afford her dowry, her father sold Moulton Hall, a manor house in North Yorkshire he had purchased soon after the birth of his daughter. The Duke and Duchess had four children:

- Lady Susan Harriet Innes-Ker (13 November 1837 – 16 October 1909)
- James Henry Robert Innes-Ker, 7th Duke of Roxburghe (5 September 1839 – 23 October 1892)
- Lady Charlotte Isabella Innes-Ker (8 August 1841 – 24 April 1881)
- Lord Charles John Innes-Ker (31 December 1842 – after 1904)

== Service to Queen Victoria ==
The Duchess of Roxburghe was, by Queen Victoria's description, a "dear and valued friend" of hers. In 1861, there was speculation among the royal household that she would be appointed as Mistress of the Robes, the most prominent position among Victoria's household. One speculating courtier described Innes-Ker during this time as "a good, kind woman, very civil and gracious to everybody, very pretty, and perfectly unexceptional in character". Ultimately Innes-Ker did not receive this role, but in 1886 she did briefly take up its duties during one of Prime Minister William Ewart Gladstone's terms in office. In 1865, Victoria honoured Innes-Ker by appointing her as a Lady of the Bedchamber and conferring membership of the Royal Order of Victoria and Albert. In her new role, Innes-Ker's duties included accompanying the queen on state occasions. By 1879, she was one of Victoria's longest serving ladies-in-waiting.

While out driving a gig in April 1867, Innes-Ker's pony became startled and caused the conveyance to crash into the gig of her daughter-in-law, Lady Charles Innes-Ker. The Duchess lay injured on the grass until a passing doctor discovered the accident and helped return her to the Innes-Ker family seat of Floors Castle in Roxburghshire. Journeying for Balmoral later that year, Queen Victoria detoured from her normal route to visit the Duchess at Floors Castle that summer. In 1879, the Duke was returning home from a trip to Naples when he died in Geneva. Their eldest son James succeeded him.

The Duchess of Roxburghe was present during an attempted assassination of Victoria in 1882, when the Scotsman Roderick Maclean fired his pistol before being seized by nearby pupils of Eton College. From 1892 she served as acting Mistress of the Robes until her death on 7 May 1895 at the age of eighty. The London Standard described Victoria as being in deep grief, and Innes-Ker as "one of her Majesty's dearest, most valued, and most devoted friends, for over thirty years a Lady of the Bedchamber". Upon Innes-Ker’s death, Edith Villiers, Countess of Lytton succeeded her in this role.
