= John Eccles, 2nd Viscount Eccles =

British viscount (born 1931)

The Right Honourable The Viscount Eccles CBE
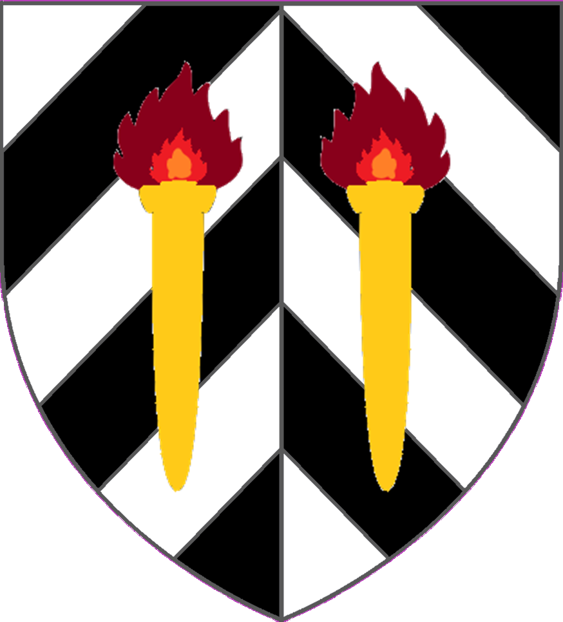

Member of the House of Lords
- Lord Temporal
- Hereditary peerage 31 March 1999 – 11 November 1999
- Preceded by: The 1st Viscount Eccles
- Succeeded by: Seat abolished
- Elected Hereditary Peer; 24 March 2005 – 29 April 2026
- By-election: 2005
- Preceded by: The 4th Baron Aberdare
- Succeeded by: Seat abolished

Personal details
- Born: 20 April 1931 (age 95)
- Party: Conservative
- Spouse: Diana Eccles, Viscountess Eccles
- Children: The Hon. Alice Eccles; The Hon. William Eccles; The Hon. Catherine Eccles; The Hon. Emily Eccles
- Education: Magdalen College, Oxford
- Occupation: Peer and businessman

John Dawson Eccles, 2nd Viscount Eccles, CBE (born 20 April 1931), is a British hereditary peer and businessman. He was one of the ninety-two hereditary peers elected to remain in the House of Lords after the passing of the House of Lords Act 1999 and sat as Conservative.

== Background and education ==
The son of the 1st Viscount Eccles and Sybil Dawson, he was educated at Winchester College and Magdalen College, Oxford, where he graduated BA in philosophy, politics and economics in 1954. He trained at the Mons Officer Cadet School and served his National Service in the 1st Battalion (60th Rifles), King's Royal Rifle Corps, as a 2nd Lieutenant.

== Political career ==
In 1985, Eccles was appointed a Commander of the Order of the British Empire (CBE); and since 1989 a DSc (Silsoe). On 24 February 1999, he entered his inheritance. Lord Eccles entered the House of Lords upon its reform; however, due to the House of Lords Act, he was soon obliged to vacate his position in the House. He was later invited to election as one of the 92 remaining hereditary peers in a by-election forced by the death of the 4th Baron Aberdare, and returned to the House in 2005.

== Directorships and similar ==
- The Nuclear Power Group: director from 1968 to 1974
- Head Wrightson & Co Ltd: managing director from 1968 to 1977, chairman from 1976 to 1977
- Glynwed International plc: director from 1972 to 1996
- Investors in Industry plc: director from 1974 to 1988
- Monopolies and Mergers Commission: member from 1976 to 1986, deputy chairman from 1981 to 1985
- Davy International Ltd: director from 1977 to 1981
- Chamberlin & Hill plc: chairman from 1982 to 2004
- Industrial Development Advisory Board: member from 1989 to 1993
- Acker Deboeck corporate psychologists: chairman from 1994 to 2004
- Commonwealth Development Corporation: member from 1982 to 1985, general manager and chief executive from 1985 to 1994.
- Courtaulds Textiles plc: director from 1992 to 2000, chairman from 1995 to 2000
- Bowes Museum Trust: chairman from 2000

== Family ==
Lord Eccles married Diana Catherine Sturge 29 January 1955, in Bletchingley, Surrey. They have four children:

- Hon. Alice Belinda Eccles (born 1958)
- Hon. William David Eccles (born 1960)
- Hon. Catherine Sara Eccles (born 1963)
- Hon. Emily Frances Eccles (born 1970)

Viscountess Eccles was created a life peer in her own right in 1990 as Baroness Eccles of Moulton, and so also sits in the House of Lords. They are one of the few couples who both hold peerages in their own right.

== Arms ==
Coat of arms of John Eccles, 2nd Viscount Eccles

Crest
A three-masted Ship sails furled pennons and flags flying Or between two Wings addorsed Sable
Escutcheon
Chevronny Argent and Sable per pale counterchanged two Torches erect Or enflamed proper
Supporters
On either side a Wolf Sable armed and langued Gules gorged with a Plain Collar attached thereto a Chain reflexed over the back and resting the interior hind paw on a Portcullis chained Or
Motto
Truth and Beauty<

Peerage of the United Kingdom
Preceded by David Eccles	Viscount Eccles; 1999–present Member of the House of Lords (1999)	Incumbent; Heir apparent: Hon. William Eccles
Parliament of the United Kingdom
Preceded by The Lord Aberdare	Elected hereditary peer to the House of Lords under the House of Lords Act 1999; 2005–2026	Position abolished under the House of Lords (Hereditary Peers) Act 2026
