= Diana Eccles, Viscountess Eccles =

The Right Honourable The Viscountess Eccles DL

Member of the House of Lords
- Lord Temporal
- Life peerage 10 May 1990 – 30 April 2026

Personal details
- Born: 4 October 1933 (age 92)
- Party: Conservative
- Spouse: John Eccles, 2nd Viscount Eccles
- Children: The Hon. Alice Eccles; The Hon. William Eccles; The Hon. Catherine Eccles; The Hon. Emily Eccles
- Education: Open University
- Occupation: Peer and businesswoman

Diana Catherine Eccles, Viscountess Eccles, Baroness Eccles of Moulton, DL (born 4 October 1933) is a British Conservative life peer and businesswoman.

== Education and early career ==
The daughter of Raymond and Margaret Sturge née Keep, she was educated at St James's School in West Malvern and at the Open University, where she received a Bachelor of Arts in 1978. Eccles worked voluntary at the Middlesbrough Community Council from 1955 to 1958, and was partner in a graphic design business from 1963 to 1977. Between 1974 and 1985, she was a member of the North Eastern Electricity Board, between 1981 and 1987 vice-chairman of the National Council for Voluntary Organisations and between 1982 and 1984 chairman of the Tyne Tees Television Programme Consultative Council. Since 1981, she is lay member of the Durham University Council and since 1985 its vice-chairman.

== Later career ==
Lady Eccles was further a member of the Advisory Council on Energy Conservation at the Department of Energy from 1982 to 1984, of the Widdicombe Inquiry into Local Government and the Home Office Advisory Panel on Licences for Experimental Community Radio from 1985 to 1986, and of the British Rail Eastern Board from 1986 to 1992. She was director of Tyne Tees Television from 1986 to 1994, of J. Sainsbury plc from 1986 to 1995, and of Yorkshire Electricity Group plc from 1990 to 1997. Between 1990 and 1999, she was a member of the Unrelated Live Transplant Regulatory Authority and between 1991 and 1996 director of the National and Provincial Building Society. Since 1998, she is director of the Times Newspapers Holdings Ltd and of Opera North and since 2003 of London Clinic.

Eccles was a trustee of the Charities Aid Foundation from 1982 to 1989 and member of the British Heart Foundation from 1989 to 1998. Having been trustee for the York Minster Trust Fund between 1989 and 1999, she has been it again since 2006. On 10 May 1990, she was created a life peer as Baroness Eccles of Moulton, of Moulton in the County of North Yorkshire and became a member of the House of Lords. In 1995, Eccles received an Honorary Doctor of Civil Laws from the University of Durham.

Lady Eccles was later the Chairman of Ealing, Hammersmith and Hounslow Health Authority from 1988-2000. Eccles was also a United Kingdom Delegate to The Council of Europe from 2011 to 2021.

== Personal life ==
Since 1955, she has been married to the 2nd Viscount Eccles. They have three daughters and one son, her husband's heir apparent The Hon. William David Eccles. She and her husband are one of the few couples who both hold noble titles in their own right.

== Lords Select Committees membership ==
- Pre-Legislative Scrutiny on Mental Health Bill (2004–2005)
- Communications (2007–2010)
- Intergovernmental Organisations (2008)
