= James Charles Dalbiac =

British Army officer and politician

Lieutenant-General Sir James Charles Dalbiac KCH
- Born: 1776
- Died: 8 December 1847 (aged 70–71); Albany, London
- Spouse: Susanna Dalbiac (m. 1805–1829)
- Children: Susanna Innes-Ker, Duchess of Roxburghe
- Relatives: Charles Dalbiac (father)
- Military career
- Allegiance: United Kingdom
- Branch: British Army
- Service years: 1793–1847
- Rank: Lieutenant-General
- Commands: 4th Light Dragoons; Gujarat Military District
- Conflicts: French Revolutionary Wars; Napoleonic Wars; Peninsular War; Battle of Talavera; Lines of Torres Vedras; Battle of Campo Maior; Battle of Villagarcia; Battle of Salamanca
- Awards: Military General Service Medal

Member of Parliament for Ripon
- In office 1835–1837

Personal details
- Party: Tory

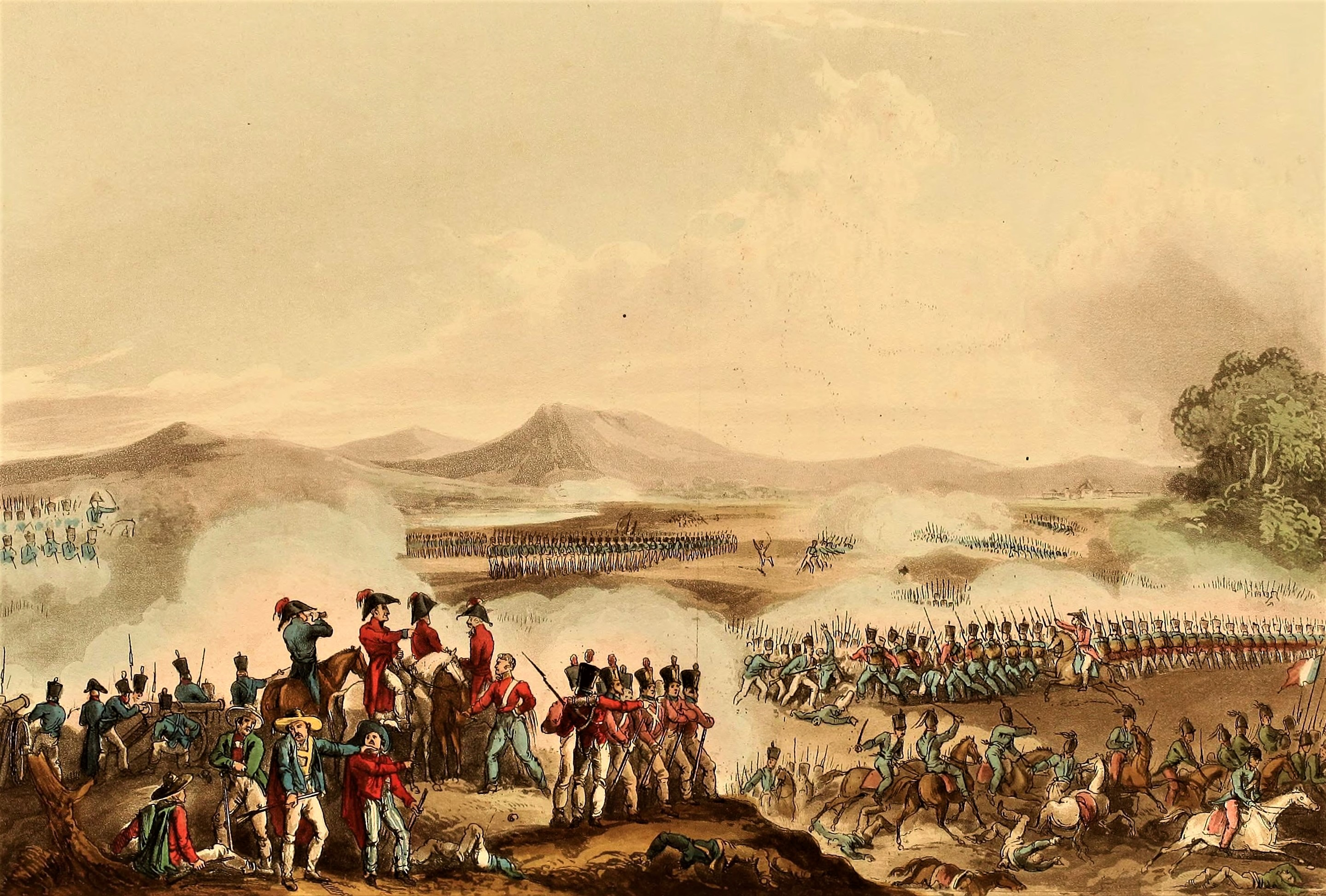
Battle of Talavera

Lieutenant-General Sir James Charles Dalbiac KCH (1776 – 8 December 1847) was a British Army officer and politician.

== Life ==
He was born the eldest son of Charles Dalbiac of Hungerford Park, Berkshire.

In 1793 he joined the 4th Light Dragoons as a cornet and was promoted to lieutenant in 1794, captain in 1798, major in 1801, and lieutenant-colonel in 1808. He was posted to Portugal with his regiment in 1808 to act as second lieutenant-colonel to Lord Edward Somerset. In July 1809 he led the left wing of the 4th Light Dragoons in a charge at the battle of Talavera. He served throughout the Peninsular campaign, taking command of the regiment, in the absence of Lord Edward Somerset, at Campo Mayor in March 1811 and Los Santos in April 1811.

In 1805 Dalbiac had married Susanna Isabella, eldest daughter of Lieutenant-colonel John Dalton, of Sleningford Hall, Ripon, Yorkshire. She went out to nurse him when he fell ill with a fever and stayed on by his side, famously at the Battle of Salamanca. In that battle on 22 July 1812 the 4th Light Dragoons, the 5th Dragoon Guards and the 3rd Light Dragoons were under the command of Major-general Le Marchant and took part in a charge in which the general was killed. Susanna went onto the battlefield to help the wounded. After the battle of Salamanca Dalbiac returned with his wife to England and never saw active service again. He was promoted colonel in 1814.

In 1814 Susanna gave birth to her only daughter, Susanna Stephania, and in 1815 the Dalbiacs bought Moulton Hall, near Richmond, North Yorkshire, but when their daughter married James Innes-Ker, 6th Duke of Roxburghe in 1836 they were obliged to sell the house to finance her dowry.

From 1822 to 1824 he was brigadier-general commanding the Goojerat district of the Bombay army and was promoted major-general in 1825 and made a Knight Commander of the Royal Guelphic Order (KCH) by William IV. He was promoted lieutenant-general in 1838 and made colonel of the 3rd Dragoon Guards in 1839. He was transferred to the colonelcy of his old regiment, the 4th Light Dragoons, in September 1842.

He was elected M.P. for Ripon in 1835, sitting until 1837. He died in London in 1847.

== Works ==
Dalbiac wrote a catechism for young and non-commissioned cavalry officers and was a disciple of the writer Izaak Walton. He was also the author of A Few Words on the Corn Laws: Wherein are Brought Under Consideration Certain of the Statements which are to be Found in the Third Edition of Mr. McCulloch's Pamphlet Upon the Same Subject, published in 1841.

== Notes ==
Parliament of the United Kingdom
Preceded by Thomas Staveley; Joshua Crompton	Member of Parliament for Ripon; 1835–1837; With: Thomas Pemberton	Succeeded by Thomas Pemberton; Sir Edward Sugden
Military offices
Preceded by Samuel Hawker	Colonel of the 3rd (Prince of Wales's) Dragoon Guards; 1839–1842	Succeeded by Francis Newbery
Preceded by Lord Edward Somerset	Colonel of the 4th (The Queen's Own) Regiment of (Light) Dragoons; 1842–1847	Succeeded by Sir George Scovell
