= Frances Spencer-Churchill, Duchess of Marlborough =

English noblewoman

Her Grace The Duchess of Marlborough VA
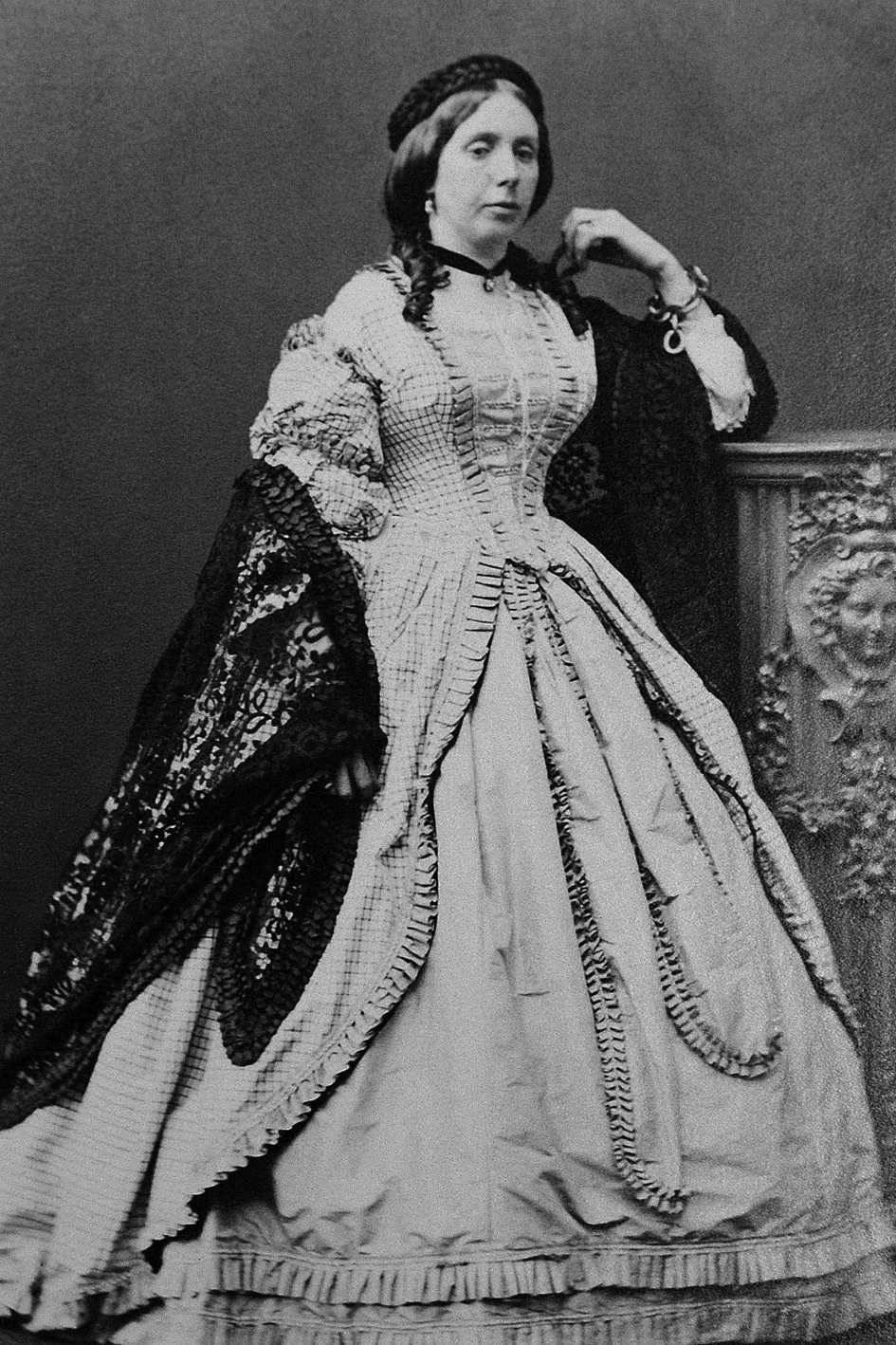
- Full-length portrait of Frances Spencer-Churchill, Duchess of Marlborough
- Born: Frances Anne Emily Vane; 15 April 1822; St James's Square, London, England
- Died: 16 April 1899 (aged 77); Blenheim Palace, Woodstock, Oxfordshire, England
- Spouse: John Spencer-Churchill, 7th Duke of Marlborough (m. 1843; died 1883)
- Issue: George Spencer-Churchill, 8th Duke of Marlborough; Lord Frederick Spencer-Churchill; Cornelia Guest, Baroness Wimborne; Lord Randolph Churchill; Rosamund Fellowes, Lady de Ramsey; Fanny Marjoribanks, Lady Tweedmouth; Anne Innes-Ker, Duchess of Roxburghe; Lord Charles Spencer-Churchill; Lord Augustus Spencer-Churchill; Georgiana Curzon, Countess Howe; Lady Sarah Wilson
- Father: Charles Vane, 3rd Marquess of Londonderry
- Mother: Lady Frances Vane-Tempest

Frances Anne Emily Spencer-Churchill, Duchess of Marlborough (15 April 1822 – 16 April 1899), was an English noblewoman, the wife of British peer and statesman John Spencer-Churchill, 7th Duke of Marlborough. One of her sons, Lord Randolph Churchill, was the father of Prime Minister Sir Winston Churchill. She had a total of 11 children, and her principal home was the monumental Blenheim Palace, which she rejuvenated with her "lavish and exciting entertainments", and transformed into a "social and political focus for the life of the nation". She was invested as a Lady of the Royal Order of Victoria and Albert for her efforts at famine relief in Ireland.

== Family ==
Lady Frances Anne Emily Vane was born on 15 April 1822 at the Duke of St Albans's house in St James's Square, London, the eldest daughter of Irish-born Charles Vane, 3rd Marquess of Londonderry, and his wife, heiress Lady Frances Vane-Tempest. At her baptism, Arthur Wellesley, 1st Duke of Wellington, stood as her godfather. She had three brothers, including George Vane-Tempest, 5th Marquess of Londonderry, and two younger sisters. She had an older half-brother, Frederick Stewart, 4th Marquess of Londonderry, by her father's first marriage to Lady Catherine Bligh.

== Marriage and issue ==
On 12 July 1843 at St. George Street, Mayfair, Lady Frances married John Spencer-Churchill, Marquess of Blandford. Upon her marriage she was styled Marchioness of Blandford. The couple made their principal home at the Spencer-Churchill family seat of Blenheim Palace in Woodstock, Oxfordshire.

The marriage produced eleven children:

- George Charles Spencer-Churchill, 8th Duke of Marlborough (13 May 1844 – 9 November 1892)
- Lord Frederick John Winston Spencer-Churchill (2 February 1846 – 5 August 1850)
- Lady Cornelia Henrietta Maria Spencer-Churchill (17 September 1847 – Upper Brook Street, Mayfair, London, 22 January 1927), married 25 May 1868 Ivor Bertie Guest, 1st Baron Wimborne, by whom she had issue.
- Lord Randolph Henry Spencer-Churchill (13 February 1849 – 24 January 1895), married 15 April 1874 Jennie Jerome, father of Sir Winston Churchill and John Strange Spencer-Churchill.
- Lady Rosamund Jane Frances Spencer-Churchill (9 November 1851 – 3 December 1920), married 12 July 1877 William Fellowes, 2nd Baron de Ramsey, by whom she had issue
- Lady Fanny Octavia Louise Spencer-Churchill (29 January 1853 – 5 August 1904), married 9 June 1873 Edward Marjoribanks, 2nd Baron Tweedmouth, by whom she had issue.
- Lady Anne Emily Spencer-Churchill (Lower Brook Street, Mayfair, London, 14 November 1854 – South Audley Street, Mayfair, London, 20 June 1923), married 11 June 1874 James Innes-Ker, 7th Duke of Roxburghe, by whom she had issue.
- Lord Charles Ashley Spencer-Churchill (25 November 1856 – 11 March 1858)
- Lord Augustus Robert Spencer-Churchill (4 July 1858 – 12 May 1859)
- Lady Georgiana Elizabeth Spencer-Churchill (10 St James's Square, St James's, London, 14 May 1860 – 9 February 1906), married 4 June 1883 Richard George Penn Curzon, 4th Earl Howe, by whom she had issue.
- Lady Sarah Isabella Augusta Spencer-Churchill (4 July 1865 – 22 October 1929), a war correspondent during the Boer War; married 21 November 1891 Lt. Col. Gordon Chesney Wilson (son of Sir Samuel Wilson, MP)

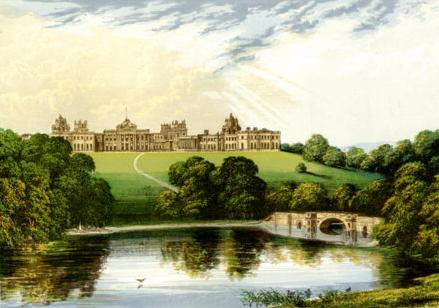
An 1880 engraving of Blenheim Palace

== Duchess of Marlborough ==
On 1 July 1857, her husband succeeded to the title of 7th Duke of Marlborough, and from that date henceforth, Frances was styled Duchess of Marlborough. She was a commanding and hot-tempered woman described in The Complete Peerage as a "woman of remarkable character and capacity, judicious and tactful". Her face had more strength than beauty and her eyes were either warm or hard, never lacklustre.

She ruled Blenheim Palace and its household with an iron hand; yet it was she who rejuvenated the palace with her lavish and gay entertainments which she herself organised; transforming the palace "into a social and political focus for the life of the nation".

She was a domineering yet devoted mother; both of her surviving sons' marriages were a disappointment to her. Her eldest son George married a woman described as stupid, pious and dull, while her youngest and favourite son, Lord Randolph earned her displeasure by marrying, against the wishes of both herself and the Duke, American socialite Jennie Jerome, whom Frances openly disliked.

Frances and her husband refused to attend Lord Randolph and Jennie's wedding at the British Embassy in Paris, which took place on Frances's 52nd birthday. Like the rest of the 19th-century British aristocracy, the Marlboroughs regarded American women as "strange and abnormal creatures with habits and manners something between a Red Indian and a Gaiety Girl". When the newly-wed couple moved to their home in Curzon Street in London, however, Frances arrived to help Jennie pay her first visits to the leaders of London society. She lent her some of her own jewels for the occasion, and the two women travelled in the Marlborough family coach. Frances featured largely in the lives of the younger members of the family, including her grandson Winston, to whom she often acted as a substitute mother.

From 1876 to 1880 her husband served as Lord Lieutenant of Ireland. As the result of her diligent efforts at famine relief in which she displayed humanity, proficiency and leadership that attempted to avert the effects of the 1879 Irish Famine, she was invested as a Lady of the Order of Victoria and Albert by Queen Victoria.

Lord Randolph Churchill, the youngest surviving son of the Duke and the Duchess

Coat of arms of Frances Spencer-Churchill, Duchess of Marlborough
Escutcheon The arms of the Duke of Marlborough(Quarterly: 1st and 4th, Sable a lion rampant Argent on a canton of the second a cross Gules (Churchill); 2nd and 3rd, quarterly Argent and Gules, in the second and third quarters a fret Or, overall on a bend Sable three escallops of the first (Spencer); in chief, on an escutcheon Argent a cross Gules surmounted by an inescutcheon Azure charged with three fleurs-de-lys Or.) impaled with the arms of The Marquess of Londonderry (Quarterly: 1st & 4th, Or, a Bend counter-company Argent and Azure, between two Lions rampant Gules (Stewart); 2nd, Argent, a Bend engrailed between six Martlets Sable (Tempest); 3rd, Azure, three sinister Gauntlets Or (Vane).).

== Last years ==
She became a widow in 1883, lost her eldest son, George, in 1892, and on 24 January 1895, her only surviving son, Lord Randolph Churchill, died at her London home in Grosvenor Square. She never stopped mourning Randolph, and harboured much resentment against his wife, whom she had never liked and now criticised for behaviour unbecoming a grieving widow.

== Death ==
Frances died at Blenheim on 16 April 1899, the day after her 77th birthday, having outlived five of her eleven children. She was buried on 21 April 1899 in the family vault beneath Blenheim Chapel. Her grandson Sir Winston Churchill wrote of her: "She was a woman of exceptional capacity, energy and decision".

== Portrayals in film and television ==
The Duchess was portrayed by Rachel Kempson in the 1974 Thames TV mini-series Jennie: Lady Randolph Churchill.

== Ancestry ==
Ancestors of Frances Spencer-Churchill, Duchess of Marlborough

16. Colonel William Stewart, of Ballylawn
8. Alexander Stewart, of Mount Stewart
17. Frances Stewart
4. Robert Stewart, 1st Marquess of Londonderry
18. John Cowan
9. Mary Cowan
19. Anne Stewart
2. Charles Vane, 3rd Marquess of Londonderry
20. Sir John Pratt
10. Charles Pratt, 1st Earl Camden
21. Elizabeth Wilson
5. Lady Frances Pratt
22. Nicholas Jeffreys
11. Elizabeth Jeffreys
1. Frances Anne Spencer-Churchill, Duchess of Marlborough
24. George Vane
12. Sir Henry Vane, 1st Baronet
25. Anne Machon
6. Sir Henry Vane-Tempest, 2nd Baronet
26. John Tempest Sr.
13. Frances Tempest
27. Frances Shuttleworth
3. Lady Frances Vane-Tempest
28. Alexander MacDonnell, 5th Earl of Antrim
14. Randal MacDonnell, 1st Marquess of Antrim
29. Anne Plunkett
7. Anne MacDonnell, 2nd Countess of Antrim
30. Hervey Morres, 1st Viscount Mountmorres
15. The Hon. Letitia Morres
31. Lady Letitia Ponsonby

== Sources ==
- Martin, Ralph G. Jennie: The Life of Lady Randolph Churchill, Volume One, The Romantic Years (1854–1895), New American Library, New York, 1969; (ISBN 978-0304934300)
