= Anne Innes-Ker, Duchess of Roxburghe =

British aristocrat (1854–1923)

Her Grace The Duchess of Roxburghe VA OBE
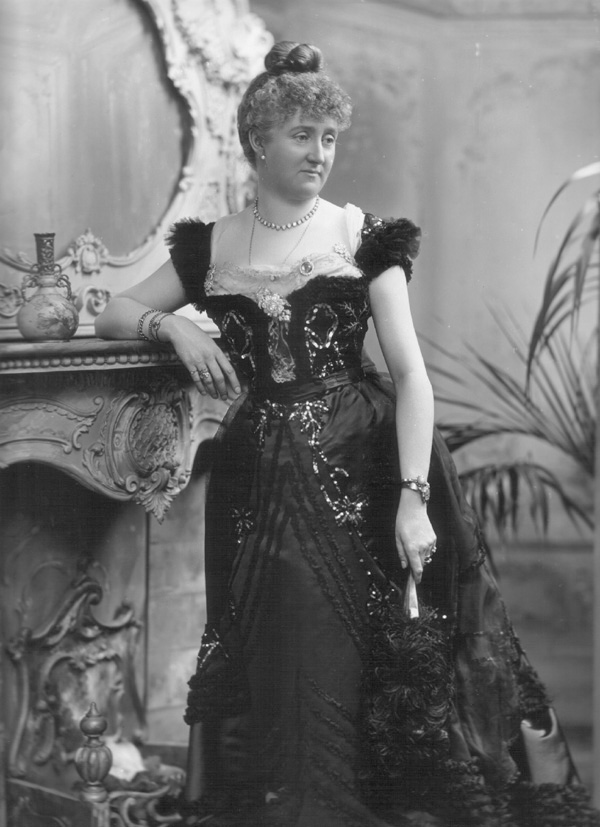
- The Duchess of Roxburghe, 1898
- Born: Anne Emily Spencer-Churchill; 14 November 1854; London, England
- Died: 20 June 1923 (aged 68); London, England
- Noble family: Spencer-Churchill
- Spouse: James Innes-Ker, 7th Duke of Roxburghe (m. 1874; died 1892)
- Issue: Lady Margaret Ewing; Henry Innes-Ker, 8th Duke of Roxburghe; Lady Victoria Villiers; Lady Isabel Wilson; Lord Alastair Innes-Ker; Lady Evelyn Collins; Lord Robert Innes-Ker
- Father: John Spencer-Churchill, 7th Duke of Marlborough
- Mother: Lady Frances Vane
- Occupation: Mistress of the Robes to Queen Victoria

Anne Emily Innes-Ker, Duchess of Roxburghe VA OBE (née Spencer-Churchill; 14 November 1854 – 20 June 1923), was the daughter of the 7th Duke of Marlborough, who served in Conservative governments as Lord President of the Council and Lord Lieutenant of Ireland. She served as Mistress of the Robes to Queen Victoria.

== Family and early life ==
Lady Anne Spencer-Churchill was born on 14 November 1854, in London. She was the fourth daughter of John Spencer-Churchill, 7th Duke of Marlborough, who served in Conservative governments as Lord President of the Council and Lord Lieutenant of Ireland, and his wife, Lady Frances Vane, daughter of the 3rd Marquess of Londonderry. Lady Anne had two brothers and five sisters. The children rarely saw their mother, as they were raised by servants. Her brother Lord Randolph Churchill later became a Conservative Chancellor of the Exchequer. Through him, Anne was the aunt of Prime Minister Winston Spencer Churchill.

== Marriage ==
On 11 June 1874, Lady Anne was married to James Innes-Ker, Marquess of Bowmont and Cessford, eldest son of the sixth Duke of Roxburghe. He succeeded his father as the seventh Duke of Roxburghe in 1879, and Anne became The Duchess of Roxburghe. He died in 1892.

In 1883, she was appointed Mistress of the Robes to Queen Victoria by the Liberal Prime Minister William Ewart Gladstone, and served in that capacity until 1885. In 1892, when Gladstone again came to power, his policy of Home Rule for Ireland had alienated many of the upper classes, and no lady of ducal rank could be found who was willing to serve as Mistress of the Robes. The post therefore remained vacant, while the Duchess of Roxburghe and the Dowager Duchess of Atholl performed the duties of the office. In 1906 she christened the newest and largest ship then in the world, the Cunard Line's RMS Mauretania.

During the First World War, she served as President of the Haddingtonshire Branch of the British Red Cross Society. She was appointed an Officer of the Order of the British Empire in the 1919 New Year Honours.

She died in 1923 in London, at the home of her daughter Lady Evelyn and her husband, Colonel William Collins, after a lengthy illness.

== Issue ==
- Lady Margaret Frances Susan Innes-Ker (1875–1930); married on 25 July 1898 to James Alexander Orr Ewing (22 February 1857 – 28 May 1900, South Africa)
- Henry John Innes-Ker, 8th Duke of Roxburghe (1876–1932), from whose only son all current Innes-Ker males are descended.
- Lady Victoria Alexandrina Innes-Ker (1877–1970); married on 17 August 1901 in London to Charles Hyde Villiers (September 1862 – 23 May 1947, London), and had issue.
- Lady Isabel Innes-Ker, later Lady Isabel Wilson (1879–1905); married on 23 June 1904 to Hon. Guy Wilson (19 May 1877 – 1 February 1943); died in childbirth.
- Lord Alastair Robert Innes-Ker (1880–1936); married in London on 10 October 1907, Anne Breese (1885 – 30 October 1959, London), an American heiress whose sister married the Earl of Ancaster, and had issue, two sons and one daughter.
- Lady Evelyn Anne Innes-Ker, later Lady Evelyn Collins (1882–1958); married on 23 November 1907 in London to Colonel William Fellowes Collins (17 September 1865 – 15 February 1948), a grandson of Lord de Ramsey, and had issue.
- Lord Robert Edward Innes-Ker (22 July 1885 – 19 July 1958); married first on 27 October 1920 (divorced 1935) at the Registry Office in London to Charlotte Josephine Cooney, otherwise the musical comedy actress José Collins (23 May 1887 – 6 December 1958), as her first husband. The couple divorced in 1935, having had no issue. He married secondly in London on 28 July 1939 to Eleanor Marie Woodhead (1887–1958); there was no issue by either marriage.

Court offices
| Preceded by The Duchess of Bedford | Mistress of the Robes to Queen Victoria; 1883–1885 | Succeeded by The Duchess of Buccleuch and Queensberry |
| Preceded by The Duchess of Buccleuch and Queensberry | Mistress of the Robes to Queen Victoria; 1892–1895 (pro tempore) jointly with The Dowager Duchess of Atholl | Succeeded by The Duchess of Buccleuch and Queensberry |
