= Moulton, North Yorkshire =

Village and civil parish in North Yorkshire, England

Coordinates: 54°25′47″N 1°38′18″W

Moulton
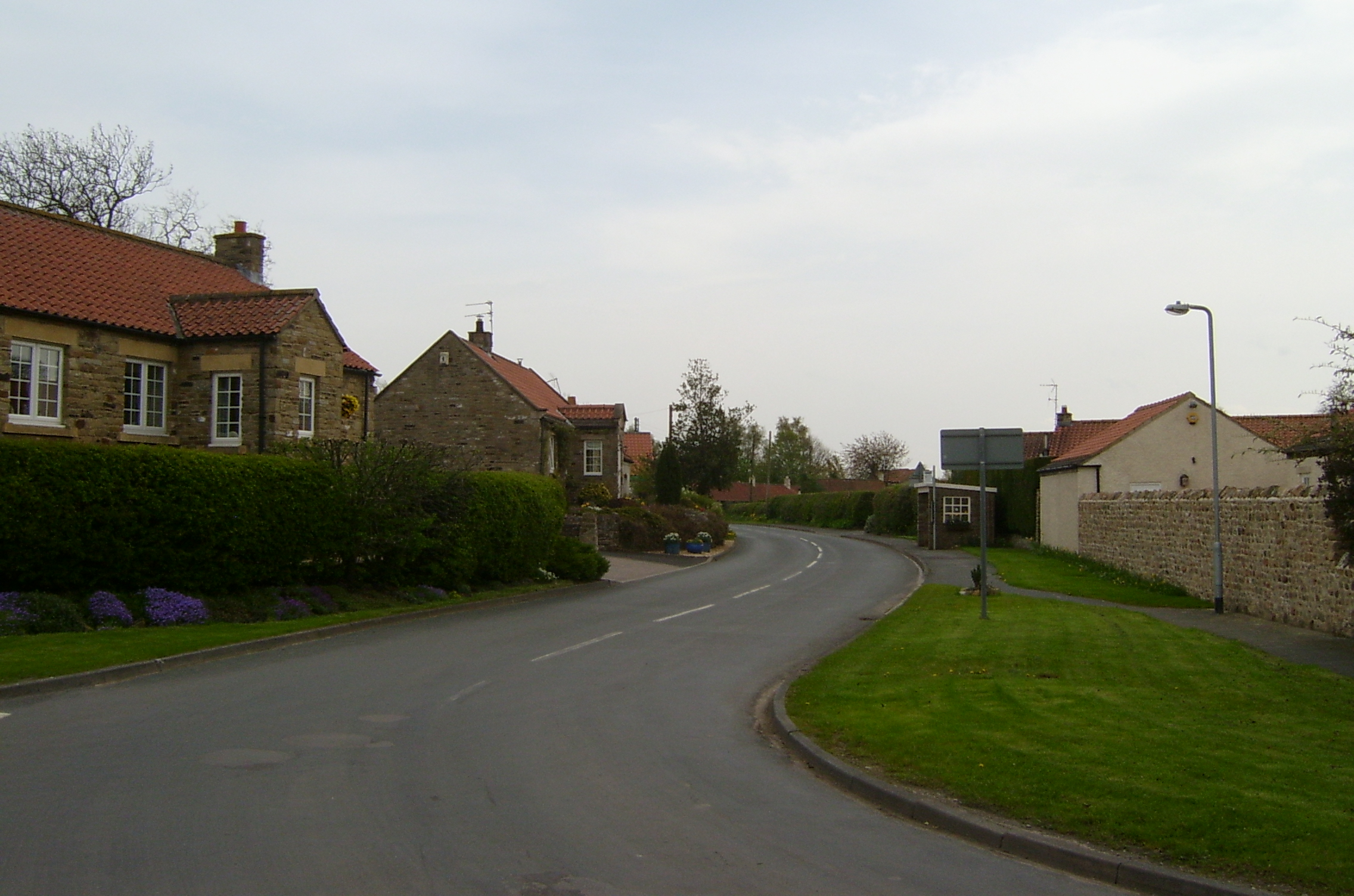
- Moulton

- Location within North Yorkshire
- Population: 245 (2011 Census)
- OS grid reference: NZ236038
- Unitary authority: North Yorkshire
- Ceremonial county: North Yorkshire
- Region: Yorkshire and the Humber
- Country: England
- Sovereign state: United Kingdom
- Post town: RICHMÖND
- Postcode district: DL10
- Police: North Yorkshire
- Fire: North Yorkshire
- Ambulance: Yorkshire

Moulton is a small village and civil parish in the county of North Yorkshire, England. It lies in a secluded valley between the villages of Scorton and Middleton Tyas.

From 1974 to 2023 it was part of the district of Richmondshire, it is now administered by the unitary North Yorkshire Council.

== Amenities ==
Moulton Hall is a 17th-century manor house, owned and maintained by the National Trust, it was formerly tenanted by Viscount Eccles and his wife, the Baroness Eccles of Moulton. It is possible to gain admission via prior arrangement with the tenant.

The village pub is called the Black Bull inn.

== History ==
The name Moulton derives from either the Old English Mulatūn, Mulitūn, or mūltūn, meaning 'Mula's', 'Muli's' or 'mule settlement'.

Moulton is mentioned in the Domesday Book as the residence of a Saxon named Ulph.

After the Norman Conquest the manor was transferred to the Earls of Richmond. Moulton changed hands many times, belonging to the Marshall, Wright, Smithson, and Shuttleworth families.

The artist George Cuitt the Elder was born in Moulton.

== Transport ==
The village lies just to the east of the A1, but access from the village has been restricted to southbound traffic via Scurragh Lane since the early 1990s. Motorists intending to travel north must head to Scotch Corner via the local road. When the A1(M) extension opens, Scurragh Lane will afford a Local Access Road (LAR) going northwards to Scotch Corner only.

The village is served by a rural bus route between Darlington and Richmond.

The former railway station at Moulton End (3 miles away) is named after Moulton, but the nearest station was actually Scorton railway station. Both stations closed in 1969 with the abandonment of the Eryholme-Richmond branch line.

== See also ==
- Listed buildings in Moulton, North Yorkshire
