= George Renny (surgeon) =

Irish physician, 1757 - 1848

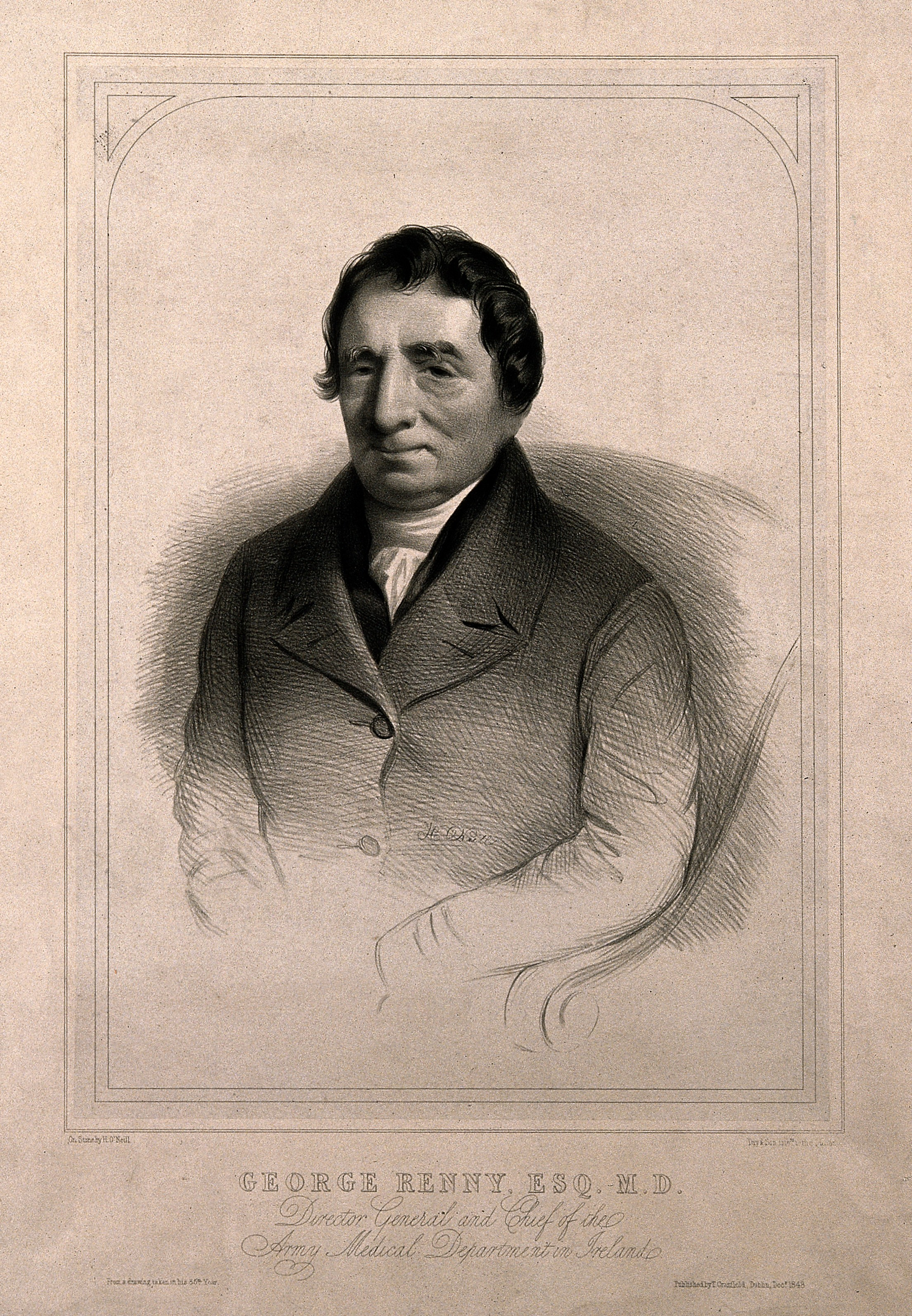
Portrait. Credit: Wellcome Collection

George Renny (18 August 1757 – 11 November 1848) was the president of the Royal College of Surgeons in Ireland (RCSI) in 1793.

Renny earned his medical education and degree from the University of Edinburgh; he entered the army as the surgeon's mate in the 67th Regiment in 1775. In 1780 he was promoted to surgeon and transferred to the 77th Regiment. In 1783, that regiment was disbanded after it mutinied in response to the government's decision to send it to India. This was contrary to the express conditions under which its members had been recruited. Immediately after this event Renny settled in Dublin and after some time he was appointed Surgeon and Physician to the Royal Hospital Kilmainham. Later, as governor and commissioner of the Foundlings’ Hospital, he introduced a programme to treat venereal disease in admitted children. Renny also served as governor of Cork Street Fever Hospital. He also served on a commission of inquiry into the House of Industry Hospitals.

Renny rendered services to the Royal College of Surgeons in Ireland, and was involved in persuading the government to give grants towards construction in St Stephen's Green.

Renny died on 11 November 1848, and was interred in the cemetery of the Royal Hospital. A tablet in his memory was placed in Christ Church Cathedral soon after his death. The college paid for the tablet, and the dean and chapter remitted the fees usually charged for placing memorials in the Cathedral.
