= Floors Castle =

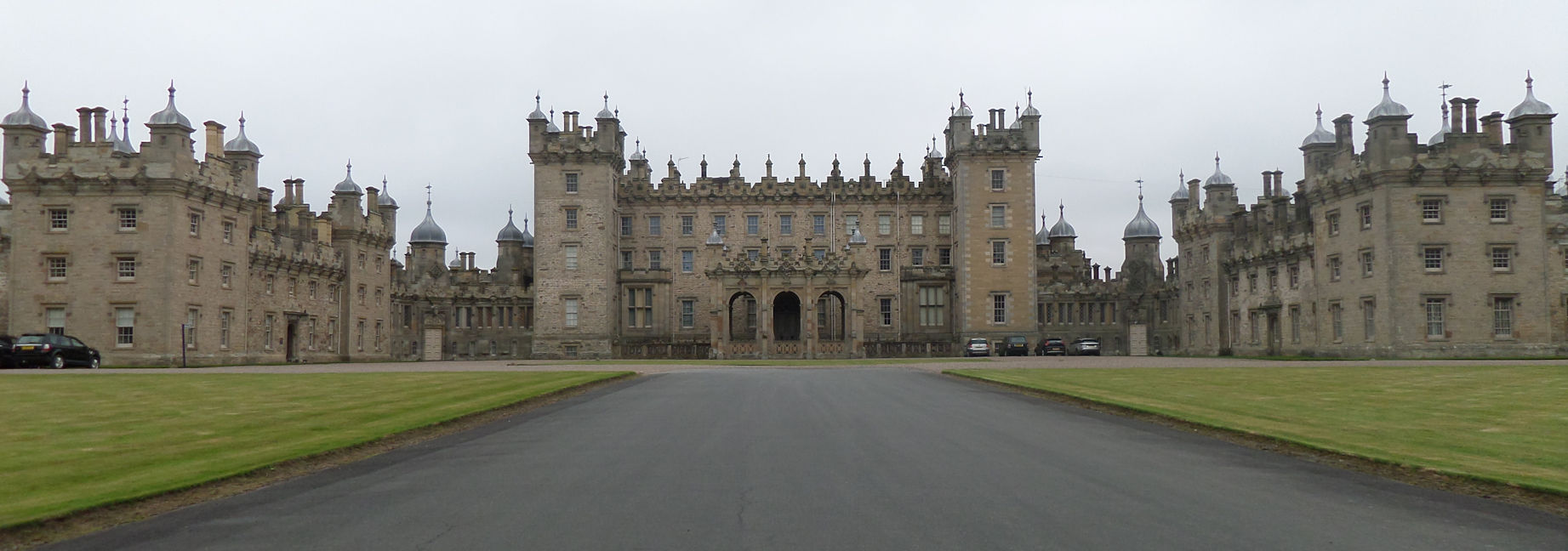
- Interactive map of the Floors Castle area

General information
- Type: Estate house
- Location: Kelso, Scottish Borders, Scotland
- Current tenants: Dukes of Roxburghe
- Location within Scottish Borders
- 55°36′18″N 2°27′37″W

History
- Built: 18th century

Listed Building – Category A
- Designated: 16 March 1971
- Reference no.: LB10480

Inventory of Gardens and Designed Landscapes in Scotland
- Official name: Floors Castle
- Designated: 1 July 1987
- Reference no.: GDL00181

Floors Castle, in Roxburghshire, south-east Scotland, is the seat of the Duke of Roxburghe. Despite its name it is an estate house rather than a fortress. It was built in the 1720s by the architect William Adam for John Ker, 1st Duke of Roxburghe, possibly incorporating an earlier tower house. In the 19th century it was embellished with turrets and battlements, designed by William Playfair, for The 6th Duke of Roxburghe. Floors has the common 18th-century layout of a main block with two symmetrical service wings. Floors Castle stands by the bank of the River Tweed and overlooks the Cheviot Hills to the south.

Floors Castle is now a category A listed building, and the grounds are listed in the Inventory of Gardens and Designed Landscapes, the national listing of significant gardens in Scotland. It is open to the public.

== History ==
=== Background ===
The Ker family, Earls and Dukes of Roxburghe, have held lands in Roxburghshire since the 12th century. Their origins are not certain, but they were likely of Norman stock originally. Since the accession of Sir James Innes as Duke in 1812, they have used the double-barelled name "Innes-Ker".

The name of Floors Castle is thought to come either from "flowers" (or the French fleurs), or from the "floors", or terraces, on which the castle is built.

=== Early history ===
Although the present castle lacks all defensive capabilities, and was built in a period when private fortresses had become obsolete in lowland Scotland, there was possibly a tower house on the site. Tower houses, or pele towers, were typical of the Scottish Borders. Until the early seventeenth century, the Anglo-Scottish border lands, or "Marches", were a lawless place where reprisal attacks were common, and which often took the form of cattle rustling or murders, carried on by gangs of Reivers. Floors also stands opposite the site of Roxburgh Castle, an important medieval fortress where King James II was killed during a siege in 1460.

The lands of Floors were held by the monks of Kelso Abbey, until the Reformation, when they were handed to Robert Ker of Cessford (1570–1650, later the first Earl of Roxburghe) by King James VI.

=== The country house ===
John, Earl of Roxburghe (1680–1741), played a role in securing the Union of England and Scotland in 1707, and was rewarded by being created Duke of Roxburghe. He commissioned the Scottish architect William Adam (1689–1748), father of Robert Adam, to design a new mansion incorporating the earlier tower house. It was built between 1721 and 1726, and comprised a plain block, with towers at each corner. Pavilions on either side housed stables and kitchens.

Around 1837, James Innes-Ker, 6th Duke of Roxburghe (1816–1879) commissioned the fashionable architect William Henry Playfair to remodel and rebuild the plain Georgian mansion house he had inherited. The present form of the building is the result of Playfair's work, and is in a similar style to his buildings at Donaldson's College, Edinburgh. In 1903, Henry Innes-Ker, 8th Duke of Roxburghe married the American heiress Mary Goelet. She brought with her from her Long Island home a set of Gobelins Manufactory tapestries that were incorporated into the ballroom in the 1930s, and added to the collection several modern pictures by Walter Sickert and Henri Matisse, among others.

On 19 July 2022, a record of 35.1 °C was measured in this area; this is Scotland's hottest temperature.

== In popular culture ==
The castle featured in the 1984 movie Greystoke: The Legend of Tarzan, Lord of the Apes and was also featured on an episode of An American Aristocrat's Guide to Great Estates on the Smithsonian Channel and Amazon Prime Video: it first aired in 2020.

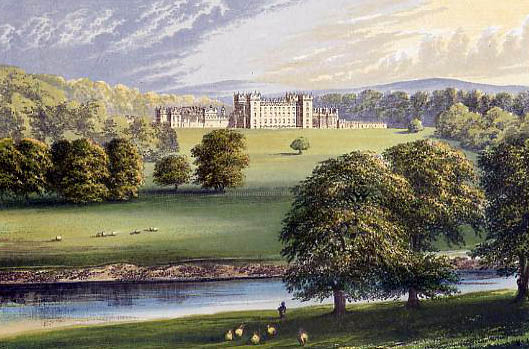
Floors Castle in 1880, viewed across the Tweed

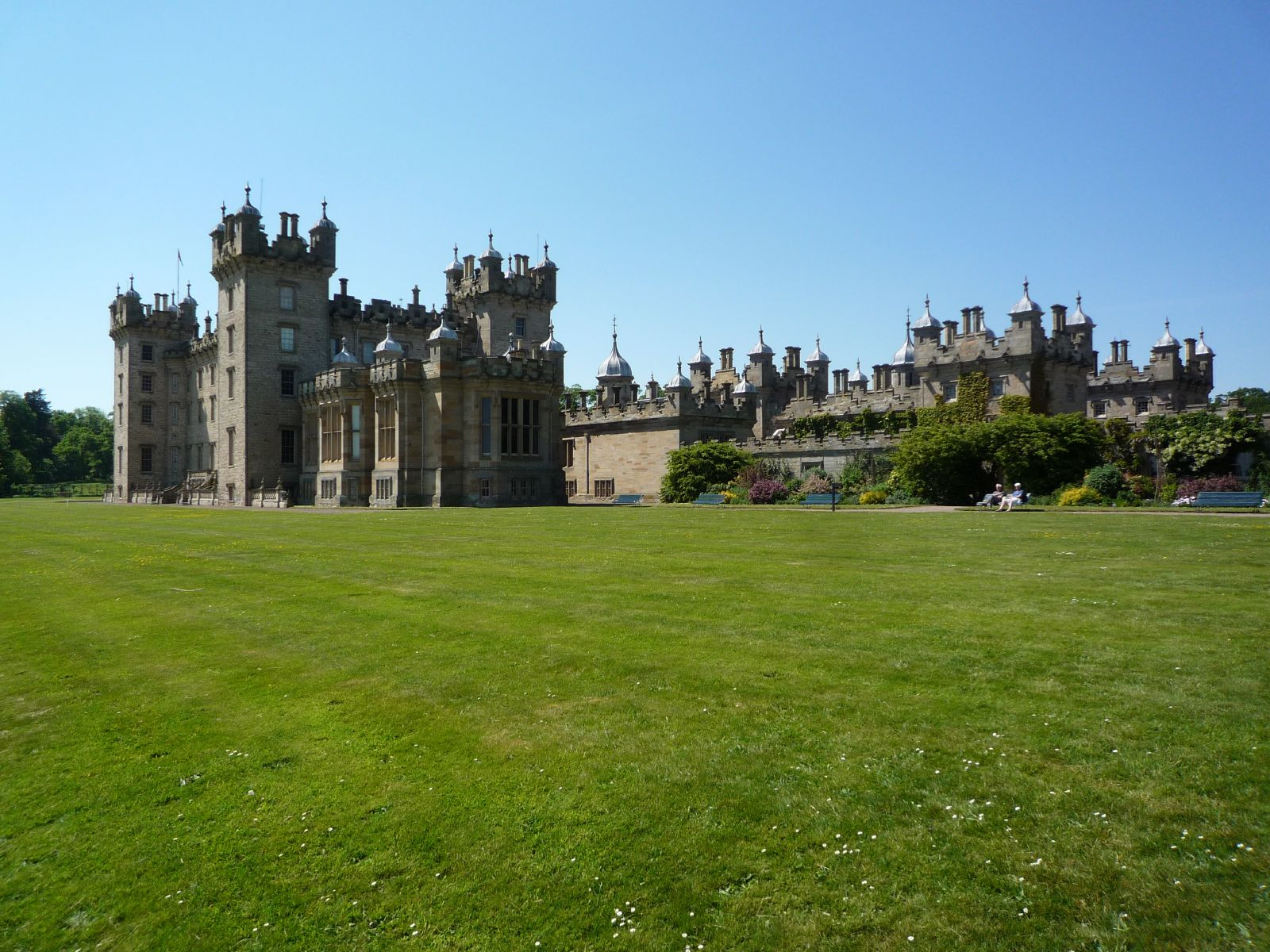
Floors Castle

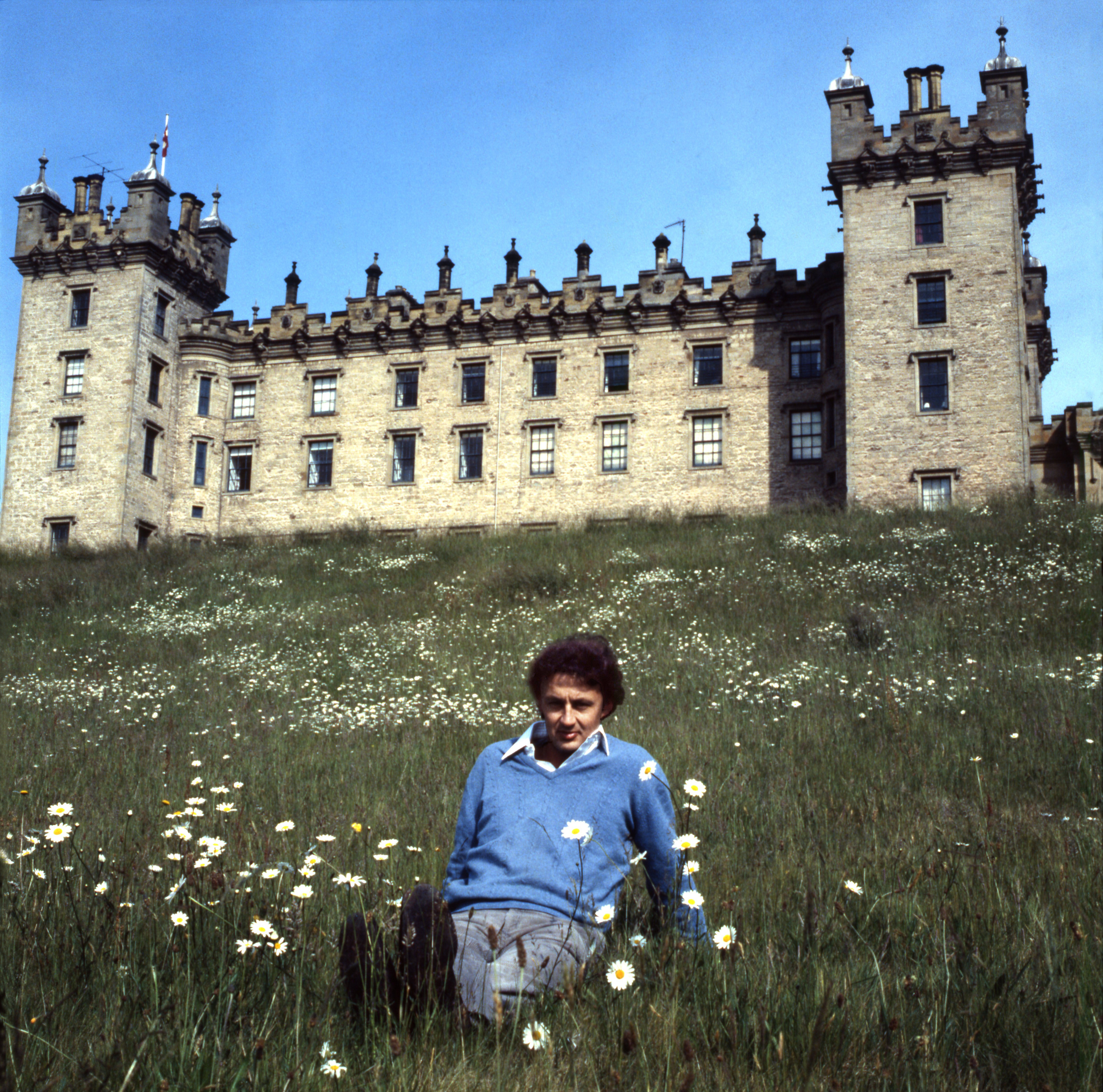
Guy, 10th Duke of Roxburghe outside Floors Castle, by Allan Warren
