= James Innes-Ker, 6th Duke of Roxburghe =

Scottish peer (1816–1879)

His Grace The Duke of Roxburghe KT
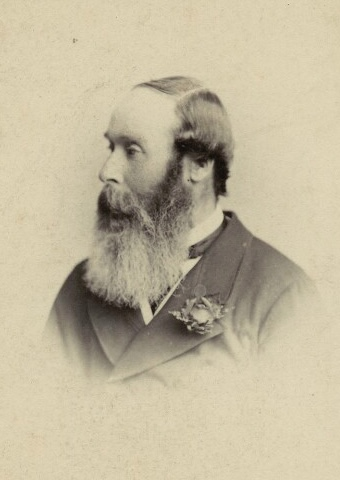
- Portrait by Thomas Richard Williams, c. 1860s

Lord Lieutenant of Berwickshire
- In office 1873–1879
- Preceded by: Baron Marjoribanks
- Succeeded by: Lord Dunglass

Personal details
- Born: James Henry Robert Innes-Ker; 12 July 1816
- Died: 23 April 1879 (aged 62) Genoa, Italy
- Spouse: Susanna Stephania Dalbiac (m. 1836)
- Parent(s): James Innes-Ker, 5th Duke of Roxburghe; Harriet Charlewood
- Education: Eton College
- Alma mater: Christ Church, Oxford

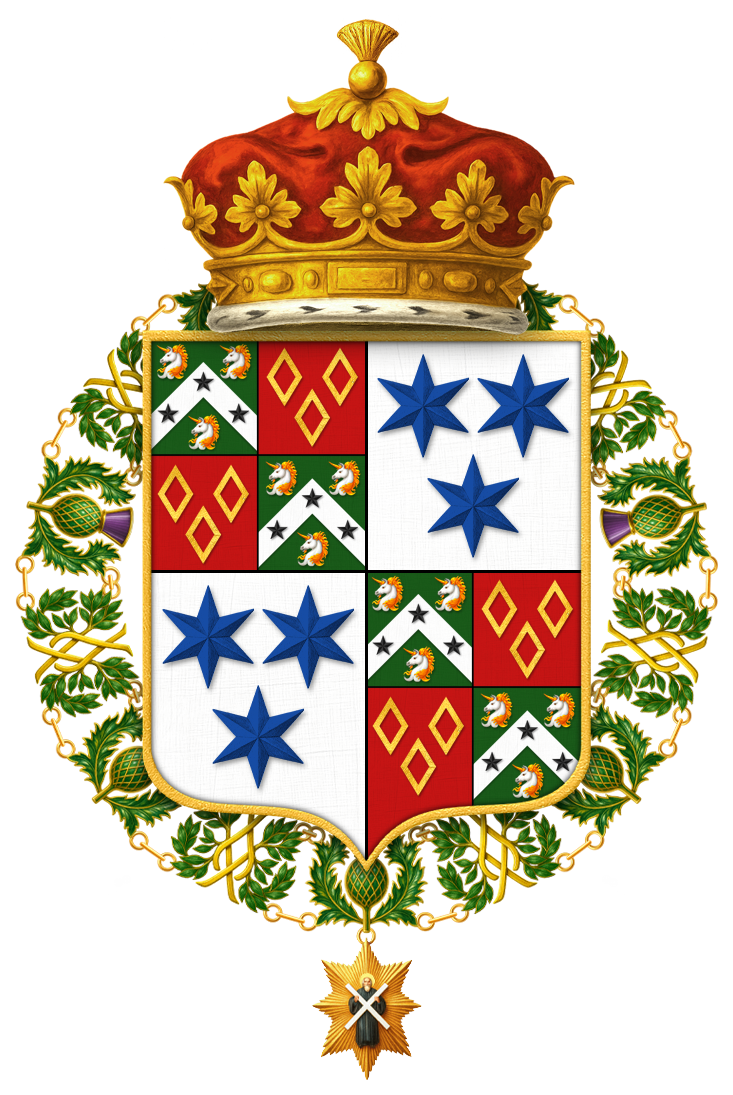
Shield of Arms of James Henry Robert Innes-Ker, 6th Duke of Roxburghe, KT

James Henry Robert Innes-Ker, 6th Duke of Roxburghe, KT (12 July 1816 – 23 April 1879) was a Scottish peer.

== Early life ==
Innes-Ker was the only surviving child of the 5th Duke of Roxburghe and the former Harriet Charlewood (c. 1778–1855). Before his parents' marriage in 1807, his father was widowed from his marriage to Mary Wray, eldest daughter of Sir John Wray, 12th Baronet. After his father's death in 1823, his mother remarried to Lt. Col. Walter Frederick O'Reilly CB of the Royal African Corps on 14 November 1827.

His maternal grandfather was Benjamin Charlewood of Windlesham in Surrey and his paternal grandparents were Sir Henry Innes, 5th Baronet and Anne (née Grant) Innes.

In 1823, at the age of seven, he inherited his father's titles. He was educated at Eton and Christ Church, Oxford.

== Career ==
In 1840, he was a Knight of the Thistle. He also served as Lieutenant General of the Royal Company of Archers, a governor of the National Bank of Scotland and Lord Lieutenant of Berwickshire from 1873 until his death in 1879.

== Personal life ==
On 29 December 1836, he married Susanna Stephania Dalbiac (1814–1895), the only child of Lt. Gen. Sir James Charles Dalbiac and Susannah (née Dalton) Dalbiac. Together, James and Susanna were the parents of four children:

- Lady Susan Harriet Innes-Ker (1837–1909), who married Sir James Grant Suttie, 6th Baronet.
- James Henry Robert Innes-Ker, 7th Duke of Roxburghe (1839–1892), who married Anne Emily Spencer-Churchill, daughter of the John Spencer-Churchill, 7th Duke of Marlborough.
- Lady Charlotte Isabella Innes-Ker (1841–1881), who married George Russell, eldest son of Capt. William Russell RN.
- Lord Charles John Innes-Ker (1842–1919), who married Blanche Peers-Williams, daughter of Col. Thomas Peers Williams, of Craig-y-Don.

Roxburghe died in Genoa on 23 April 1879. After a funeral at Floors Castle, he was interred in the aisle at Bowden. He was succeeded in his titles and estates by his eldest son James. The Dowager Duchess was one of Queen Victoria's staff until the former died in 1895.

Honorary titles
Preceded by David Robertson	Lord Lieutenant of Berwickshire; 1873–1879	Succeeded by Lord Dunglass
Peerage of Scotland
Preceded by James Innes-Ker	Duke of Roxburghe; 1823–1879	Succeeded by James Innes-Ker
Peerage of the United Kingdom
New creation	Earl Innes; 1837–1879	Succeeded by James Innes-Ker
