= Patsy Cornwallis-West =

Anglo-Irish aristocrat

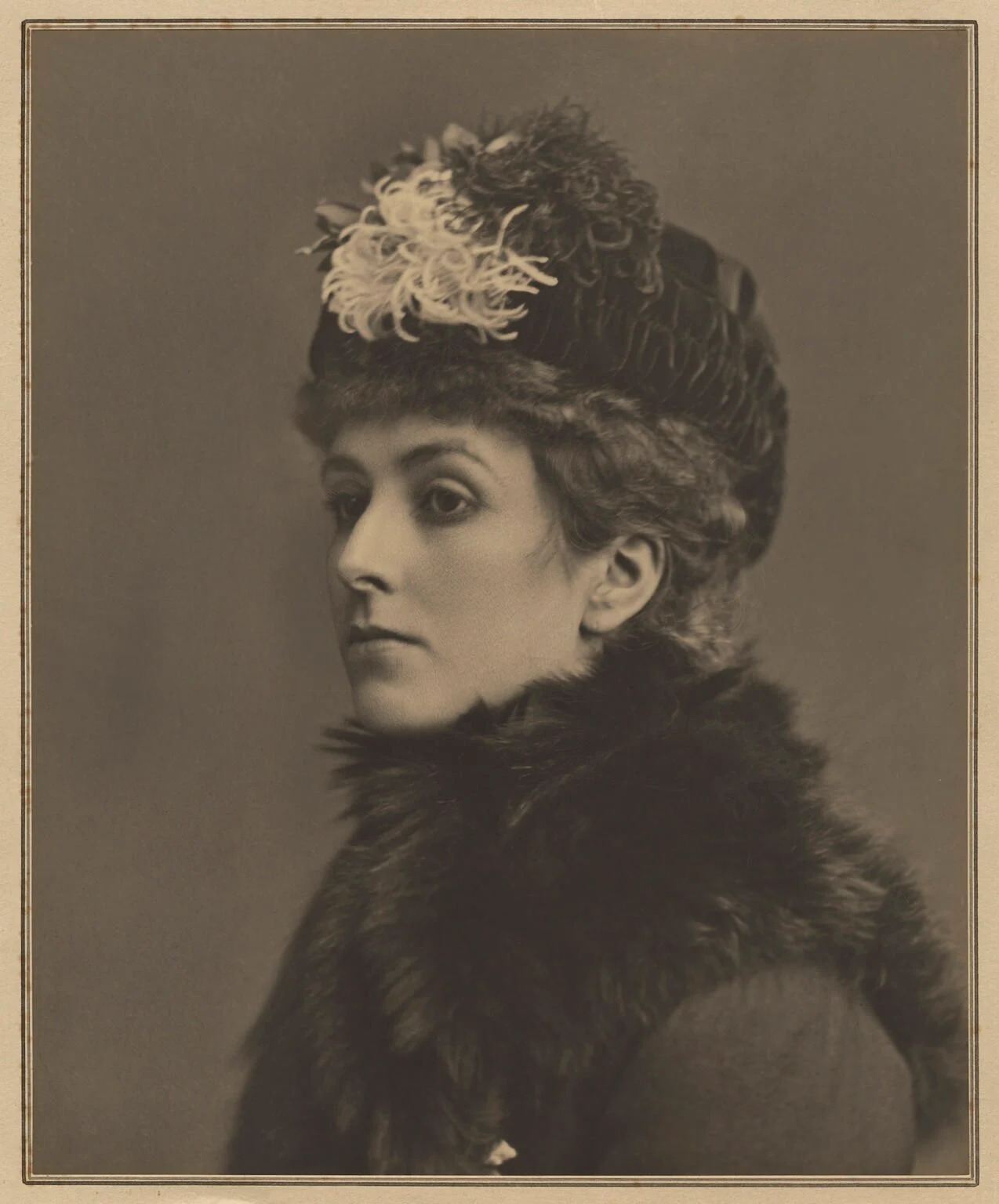
- Cornwallis-West in 1878
- Born: Mary Adelaide Virginia Thomasina Eupatoria FitzPatrick c. 1856; Ireland
- Died: 21 July 1920 (aged 63–64); Milford on Sea, Hampshire, England
- Known for: Mistress of Edward VII
- Spouse: William Cornwallis-West (m. 1872; died 1917)
- Children: Daisy, Princess of Pless; George Cornwallis-West; Shelagh Grosvenor, Duchess of Westminster
- Parent(s): Frederick FitzPatrick; Lady Olivia FitzPatrick
- Relatives: Thomas Taylour, 2nd Marquess of Headfort (grandfather); Alexander Hochberg (grandson); Lady Mary Grosvenor (granddaughter)

Mary Adelaide Virginia Thomasina Eupatoria Cornwallis-West (née FitzPatrick; c. 1856 – 21 July 1920) was an Anglo-Irish aristocrat, socialite and mistress of the Prince of Wales, later King Edward VII.

== Early life ==
Cornwallis-West was born circa 1856-1858 into an Anglo-Irish noble family as the daughter of the Rev. Frederick FitzPatrick, a descendant of the 1st Baron Upper Ossory, and Lady Olivia Taylour, daughter of Thomas Taylour, 2nd Marquess of Headfort and Olivia Dalton.

== Personal life ==
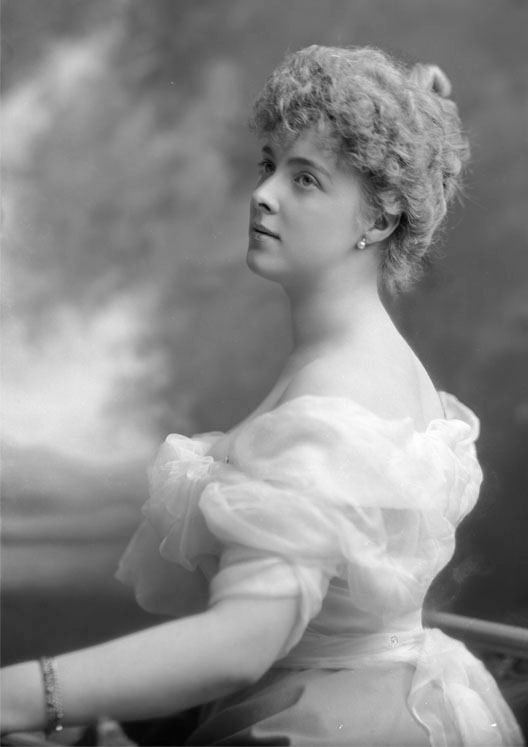
Her eldest daughter, Daisy, Princess of Pless

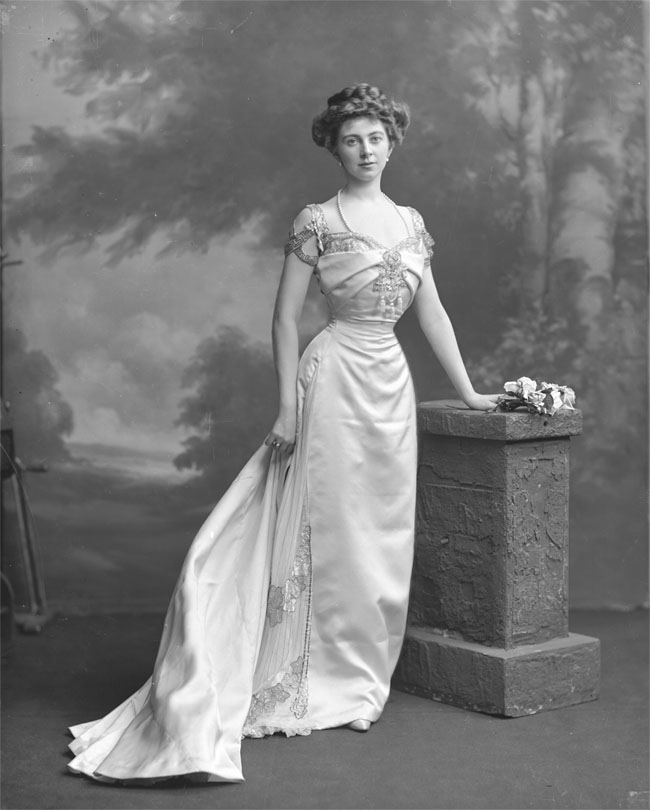
Her second daughter, Constance when Duchess of Westminster

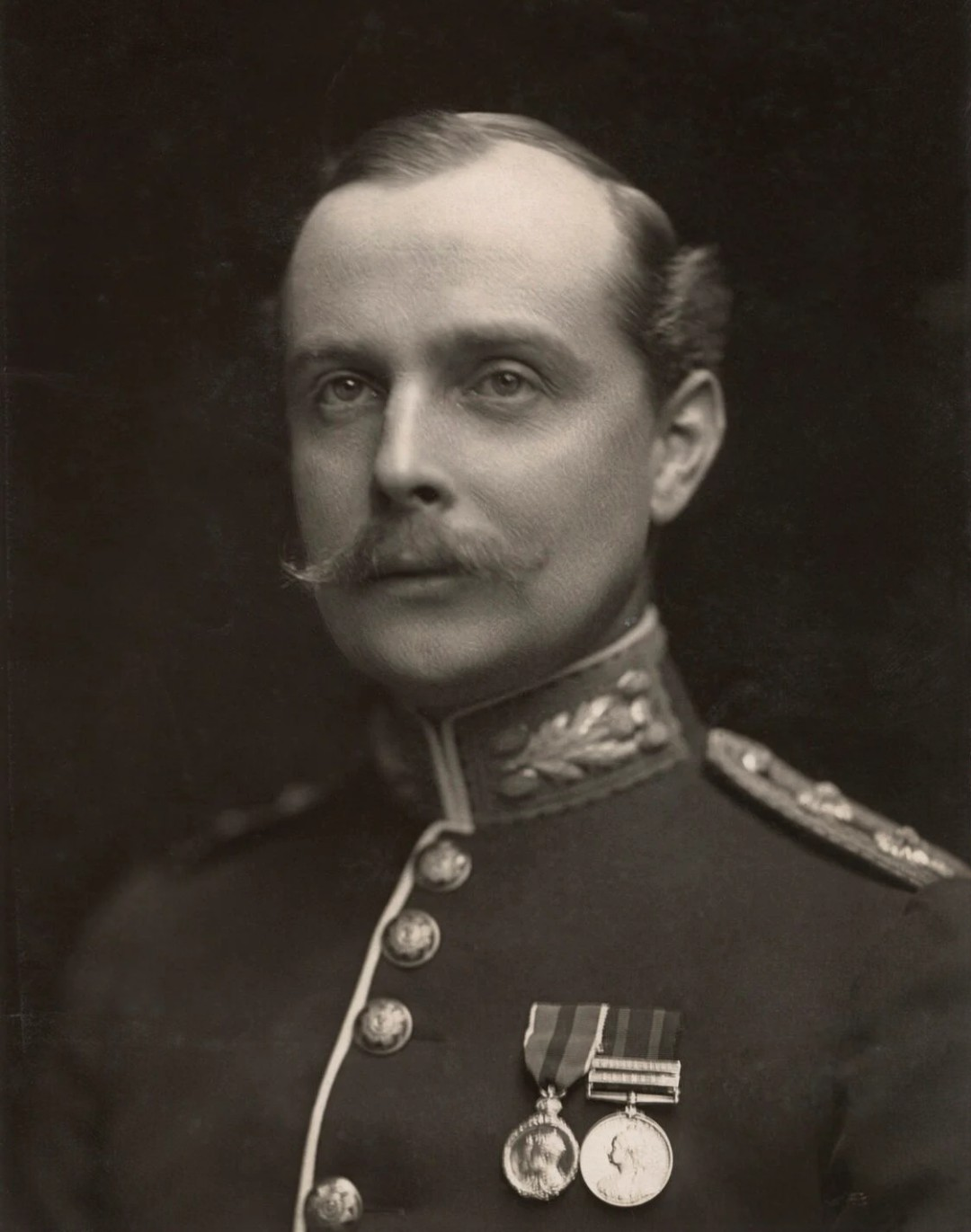
Her son, George Cornwallis-West

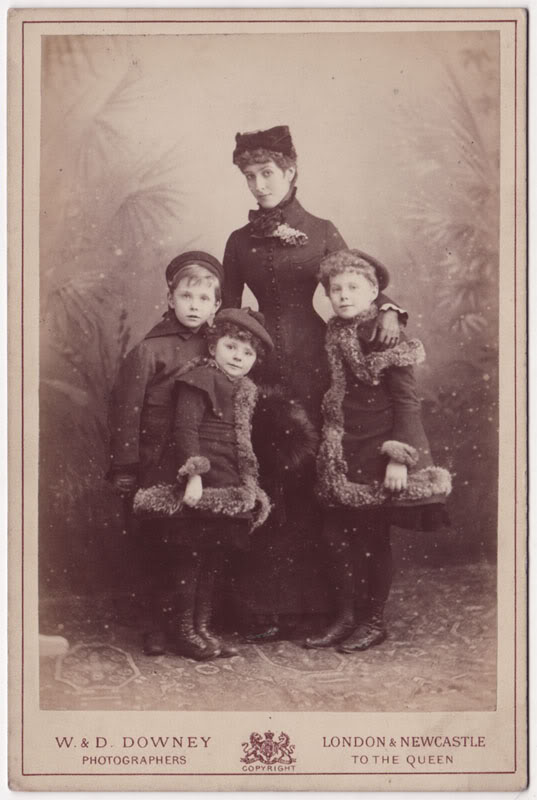
Cornwallis-West with her children

Her mother unsuccessfully attempted to seduce Albert, Prince Consort and was allegedly expelled from court. Cornwallis-West herself became the mistress of the Prince of Wales (later King Edward VII) at the age of 16. The affair was discovered, and in 1872 she was married to the Lord-Lieutenant of Denbighshire William Cornwallis-West, at the age of 17. Her husband was more than twice her age and from 1885 to 1892 served as a Member of Parliament for Denbighshire West. They lived at Ruthin Castle in Wales and had three children:

- Mary Theresa Olivia ("Daisy") Cornwallis-West (1873–1943), who married Prince Hans Heinrich XV von Hochberg.
- George Frederick Myddleton Cornwallis-West (1874–1951). It was rumoured that he was allegedly the child of the Prince of Wales, his godfather. George married the American heiress, Jennie Jerome in 1900, whom his mother was 292 days younger than. She was the widow of Lord Randolph Churchill and the mother of future Prime Minister of the United Kingdom, Winston Churchill, whom George was just 16 days older than. They divorced in 1914 and he married the stage actress Mrs Patrick Campbell the same year.
- Constance Edwina ("Shelagh") Cornwallis-West (1875–1970), who married Hugh Grosvenor, 2nd Duke of Westminster in 1901. They divorced in 1919 and she married Captain John Fitzpatrick Lewis, fourteen years her junior.

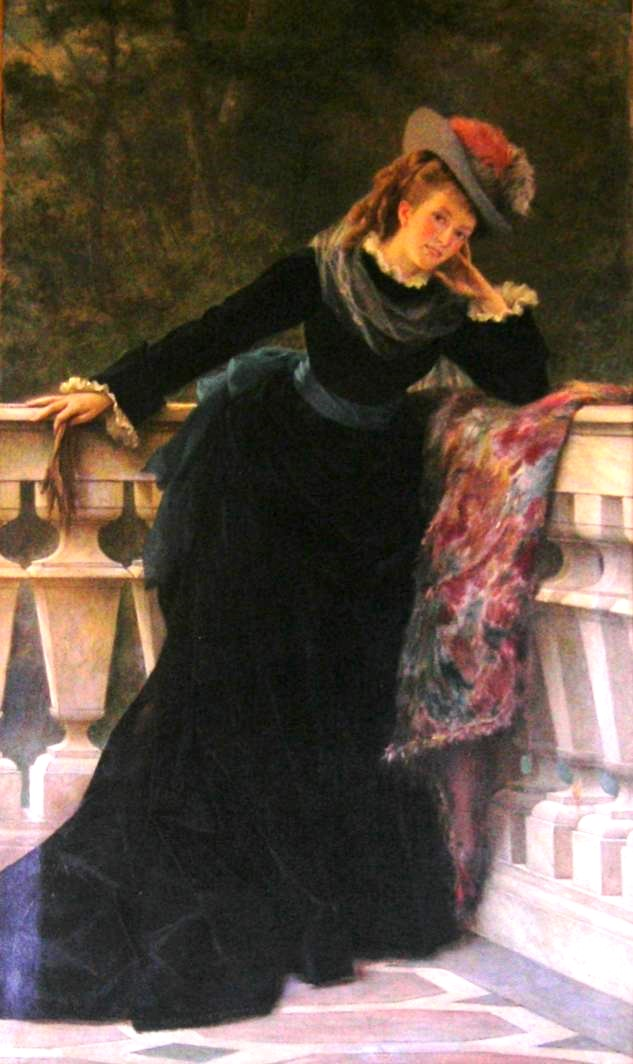
Painting of Cornwallis-West (1875) by Michele Gordigiani

Cornwallis-West became notorious for using her influence over the Prince of Wales to arrange marriages for her children, particularly the marriage of her younger daughter to the wealthy Duke of Westminster.

Through her brother Oliver Thomas Edward FitzPatrick (1863–1928) and his American wife Phoebe Lucretia Willoughby White, she was related to Olivia Lucretia FitzPatrick (1894–1971), her niece who married Austrian Imperial Councillor Count Johann Heinrich Franz Maria Larisch von Moennich (1872–1962) [cs].

In 1915, she began a relationship with a much younger shell-shocked soldier, Patrick Barrett, nursed in the Duchess of Westminster's hospital in Le Touquet, France. Her attempts to have him promoted within the army and be given a regular commission caused a scandal.

She was widowed in 1917 and died of stomach cancer three years later on 21 July 1920.

== In popular culture ==
She was portrayed by actress Jennie Linden in the 1978 London Weekend miniseries Lillie based on the life of her friend Lillie Langtry, who was another lover of Edward VII.

== See also ==
- Famous courtesans in history
