= William Cornwallis-West =

British politician

The Honourable William Cornwallis-West VD JP DL
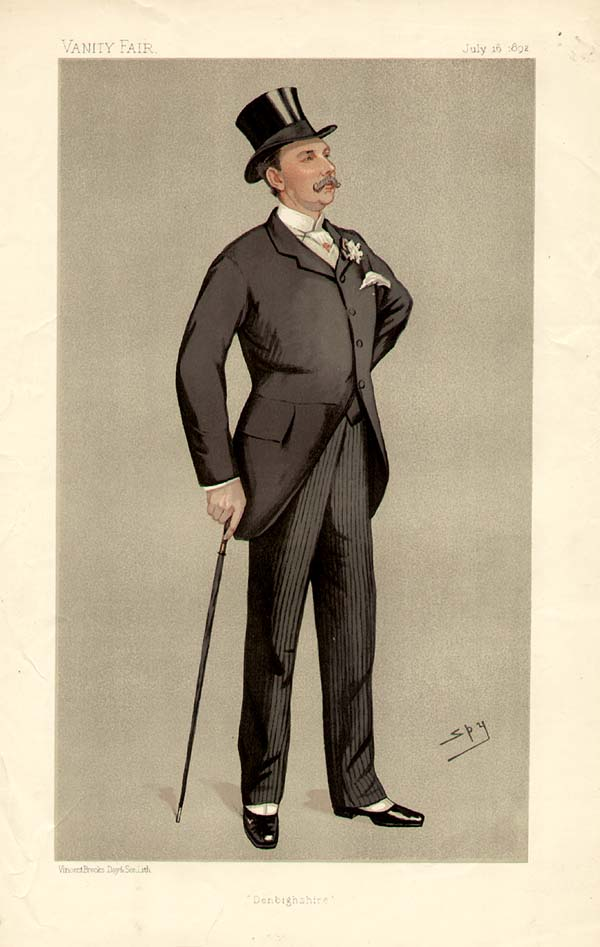
- "Denbighshire". Caricature by Spy published in Vanity Fair in 1892

Lord-Lieutenant of Denbighshire
- In office 1872–1917
- Preceded by: Robert Myddelton Biddulph
- Succeeded by: The Lord Kenyon

Member of Parliament for Denbighshire West
- In office 1885–1892
- Preceded by: New constituency
- Succeeded by: John Roberts

Personal details
- Born: William Cornwallis West; 20 March 1835 Florence, Grand Duchy of Tuscany
- Died: 4 July 1917 (aged 82) Ruthin Castle, Denbighshire, Wales
- Party: Liberal; Liberal Unionist
- Spouse: Mary Fitzpatrick (m. 1872)
- Children: Daisy, Princess of Pless; Constance Lewis; George Cornwallis-West
- Parent(s): Frederick Richard West; Theresa Cornwallis Whitby

Colonel William Cornwallis Cornwallis-West, VD, JP, DL (20 March 1835 – 4 July 1917) was a British landowner, politician for seven years from 1885 and raised the 6th (Ruthin) Denbighshire Rifle Volunteer Corps followed by further ceremonial duties in the wider territorial army in Wales.

== Early life ==
(William) Cornwallis West was born on 20 March 1835 at Florence. He was the son of Frederick Richard West, a Tory MP for Denbigh Boroughs and East Grinstead who was a member of the Canterbury Association, and his wife, Theresa Cornwallis Whitby. His father first married Lady Georgiana Stanhope (a daughter of Philip Stanhope, 5th Earl of Chesterfield).

A scion of the De La Warr Wests, his paternal grandfather was the Hon. Frederick West (a son of John West, 2nd Earl De La Warr). His maternal grandparents were both Royal Navy figures: Captain John Whitby and Mary Anne Theresa Symonds (adoptive daughter and heiress of Admiral William Cornwallis).

Following his education at Eton, he returned to the country of his birth as, like his parents, he was an enthusiastic lover of the Italianate art. While in Italy he was an amateur painter and may have fathered several illegitimate children. He returned and was called to the Bar, Lincoln's Inn, in 1862.

== Career ==
Cornwallis-West was High Sheriff of Denbighshire in 1872, Lord-Lieutenant of Denbighshire from 1872 to 1917, and a Justice of the Peace for Hampshire and Denbighshire. In 1885 he won a fought election to Parliament for Denbighshire West as a Liberal, a seat he held until 1892 latterly as a Liberal Unionist (which took an anti-Irish Home Rule line).

He lost to the Liberal Party's candidate that year as the parties began their clearer left/right split. He raised the 6th (Ruthin) Denbighshire Rifle Volunteer Corps in 1861 and became commanding officer of the 1st Volunteer Battalion, Royal Welch Fusiliers in 1885. In 1890 he became Honorary Colonel of the battalion and later of its successor, the 4th (Denbighshire) Battalion, Royal Welch Fusiliers in the Territorial Force.

In 1895 he assumed by deed poll the surname of Cornwallis-West. In his most active years he lived simultaneously in London, at Ruthin Castle, Denbighshire and at Newlands Manor, Milford, Hampshire.

== Personal life ==
Cornwallis-West married Mary Eupatoria ("Patsy") Fitzpatrick, daughter of Rev. Frederick Fitzpatrick and Lady Olivia Taylour (daughter of the 2nd Marquess of Headfort), on 3 October 1872 at Dublin. Patsy, a prominent mistress of King Edward VII, was known as a great beauty and leading socialite.

They had three children, all of whom endured divorce:

- Mary Theresa ("Daisy") Cornwallis-West (1873–1943), who married Prince Hans Heinrich XV von Hochberg (going by the name Henry of Pless from 1914).
- George Frederick Myddleton Cornwallis-West (1874–1951), second husband of Lady Randolph Churchill (the American heiress formerly known as Jennie Jerome), mother of Winston Churchill. After their 1914 divorce, he married the actress and beauty Mrs Patrick Campbell (formerly Beatrice Tanner).
- Constance Edwina ("Shelagh") Cornwallis-West (1875–1970), who married Hugh Grosvenor, 2nd Duke of Westminster. They divorced and she married her private secretary, Captain John Fitzpatrick Lewis, 14 years her junior.

Cornwallis-West died in July 1917, aged 82. His widow died in July 1920, shortly after returning from Monaco, at her family's Arnewood House which has a half-wooded holding 1.2 miles (1.9 km) north of her other mansion: Newlands, near Milford-on-Sea in Hampshire.

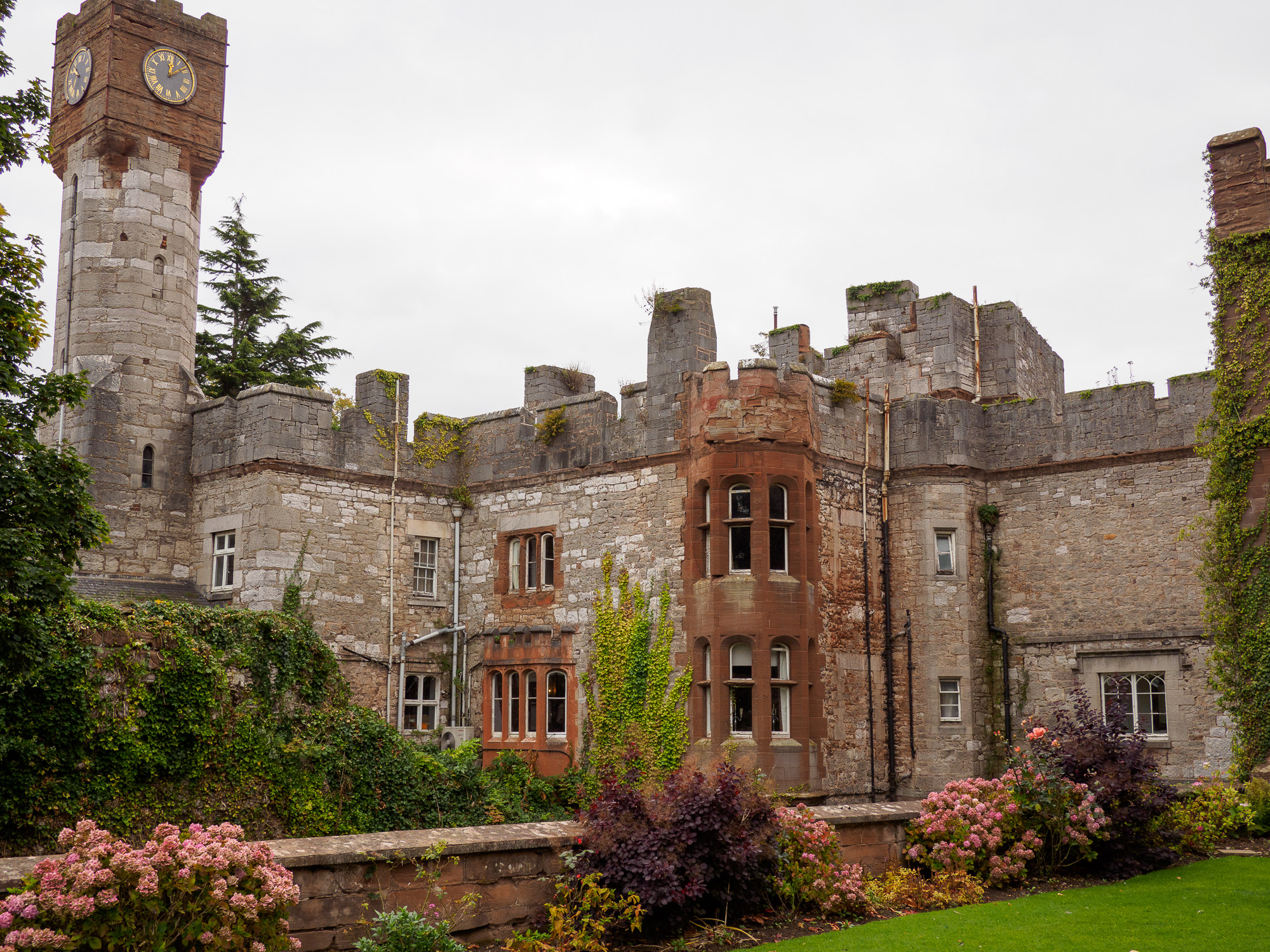
Ruthin Castle, Denbighshire

== Newlands Manor ==
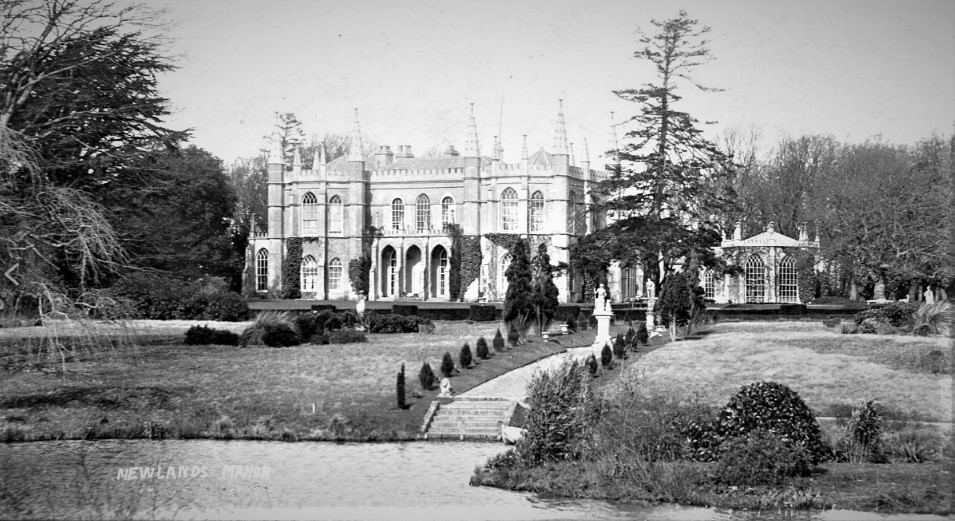
Newlands Manor, Hampshire, Milford on Sea, c. 1900

Newlands Manor, Hampshire, is a Grade II listed Strawberry Hill Gothic-style manor house, dating from the late 18th century.

George, who had already been declared bankrupt, after the sale of certain lots, decided to dispose of the bulk – the rest – of the Hampshire estate so astutely acquired by his great-grandmother.

In 1920 the estate of 2,000 acres was put up for auction in 91 lots. The mansion and its grounds and four lodges were sold in one lot. Other lots included arable, pasture and woodland, building sites in Milford, 30 cottages and farms including Batchley, Kings, Harts, Lea Green and Downton Manor.

The house, which had been badly neglected, and 500 acres was bought by Sir John Power, MP for Wimbledon, who made improvements but put it up for sale in 1948. The house and 38 acres were then acquired by a developer who turned it into six flats. As of 2023, the house was on sale for an estimated £3 million.

== Cornwallis-West Collection ==
William Cornwallis-West owned a collection of artworks, partly collected by himself, partly received from his parents. It was inherited and sold out for debts by His son George Cornwallis-West in 1919. The collection consisted of about 130 masterpieces, among which were:

- Albertinelli, Mariotto. Holy Family
- Bassano, Jacopo.
- Bellini.
- Biliverti, Giovanni. Tobias and the Angel
- Boldini, Giovanni. Portrait of William Cornwallis-West
- Veronese, Bonifazio. Sacra Conversazione (The Holy Family with Tobias)
- Botticelli, Sandro. Virgin and Child
- Bronzino, Agnolo. A Saint in the Desert
- Caravaggio, Michelangelo.
- Carruci da Pontormo, Jacopo.
- da Cortona, Pietro.
- di Cosimo, Piero. The Salutation
- di Credi, Lorenzo. Madonna and Child
- Giordano, Luca. Dives and Lazarus
- Giorgione. Portrait of a Lady of the Morosini family at Venice, with her son
- Gordigiani, Michele. Portrait of Mrs. Cornwallis-West
- Guercino.
- van Honthorst, Gerard. An Old Lady
- Hoppner, John. Portrait of a Lady (Georgina Buckley)
- Kneller, Godfrey.
- Lely, Peter.
- Lippi, Filippino. Tobias and the Angel
- van Miereveld, Michiel Janszoon.
- Moroni, Giovanni Battista. A Man with a Book
- Müller, William James. A View near Conway and Part of the Plunder found in an old house in Bristol after the riots
- Perugino, Pietro.
- Pinturicchio. Virgin and Child, with Angels
- Poussin, Nicolas. Landscape
- Raeburn, Henry. Portrait of Henry Wynyard
- van Rijn, Rembrandt Harmenszoon.
- Reynolds, Joshua. Portrait of Giuseppe Baretti
- Romney, George. Portrait of Lady Georgiana West (Buckley)
- Rosetti. Head of Magdalen
- Rowlandson, Thomas. A French Frigate towing an English Man-of-War into Port
- Raphael. Virgin with Child and Saint John
- Snyders, Frans.
- Sustermans, Justus. Head of a Girl and Portrait of Cardinal Luigi Capponi
- Teniers, David.
- Tilt. Portrait of Mrs. Cornwallis-West
- Tintoretto, Jacopo. A Venetian Senator
- del Vaga, Perino. Holy Family
- Vecellio, Tiziano. Danae and Judith with the Head of Holofernes
- Vecchio, Palma. Holy Family
- Venusti, Marcello. The Holy Family and Saint John
- Zoppo, Rocco. Madonna and child with two angels
- Unknown Artist. Portrait of a man

== See also ==
- Earl De La Warr

== Notes ==
Honorary titles
Preceded by Robert Myddelton Biddulph	Lord-Lieutenant of Denbighshire; 1872–1917	Succeeded by The Lord Kenyon
Parliament of the United Kingdom
New constituency	Member of Parliament for Denbighshire West; 1885–1892	Succeeded by John Roberts
