= Daisy, Princess of Pless =

British-German nobelwoman (1873–1943)

Daisy
- Princess of Pless
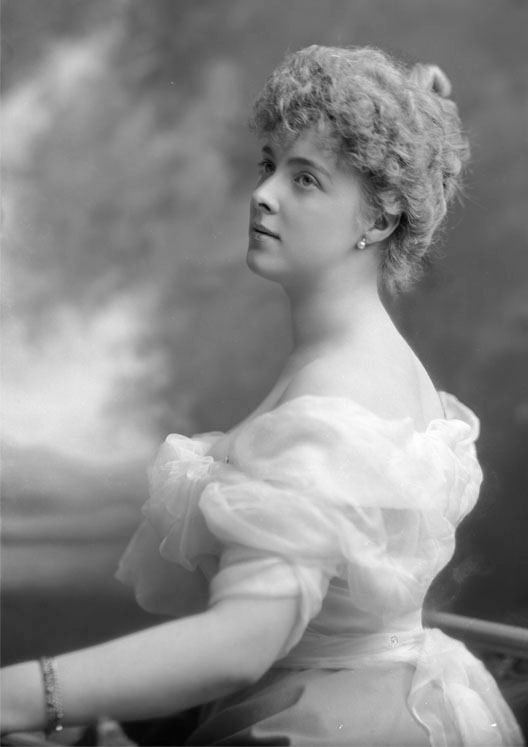
- Born: Mary Theresa Olivia Cornwallis-West; 28 June 1873; Ruthin Castle, Denbighshire, Wales
- Died: 29 June 1943 (aged 70); Waldenburg, Silesia, Nazi Germany (present-day Poland)
- Spouse: Hans Heinrich XV von Hochberg (m. 1891; div. 1922)
- Issue: Hans Heinrich XVII; Alexander; Bolko
- House: Hochberg (by marriage)
- Father: Col. William Cornwallis-West
- Mother: Mary "Patsy" FitzPatrick

Daisy, Princess of Pless (born Mary Theresa Olivia Cornwallis-West; 28 June 1873 – 29 June 1943) was a noted society beauty in the Edwardian period.

Daisy and her husband Prince Hans Heinrich XV von Hochberg were the owners of large estates and coal mines in Silesia (now in Poland) which brought an enormous fortune to the Hochbergs. During her marriage, she was a member of one of the wealthiest European noble families. She sought to prevent World War I by bringing together world leaders for peaceful discussions.

== Early life ==
Born Mary Theresa Olivia Cornwallis-West at Ruthin Castle in Denbighshire, Wales, she was the daughter of Col. William Cornwallis-West (1835–1917) and his wife, Mary "Patsy" FitzPatrick (1856–1920). Her father was a patrilineal great-grandson of John West, 2nd Earl De La Warr. Her mother was a daughter of Reverend Frederick FitzPatrick, a descendant of Barnaby Fitzpatrick, 1st Baron Upper Ossory (and thus the Kings of Osraige) and Lady Olivia Taylour, daughter of the 2nd Marquess of Headfort.

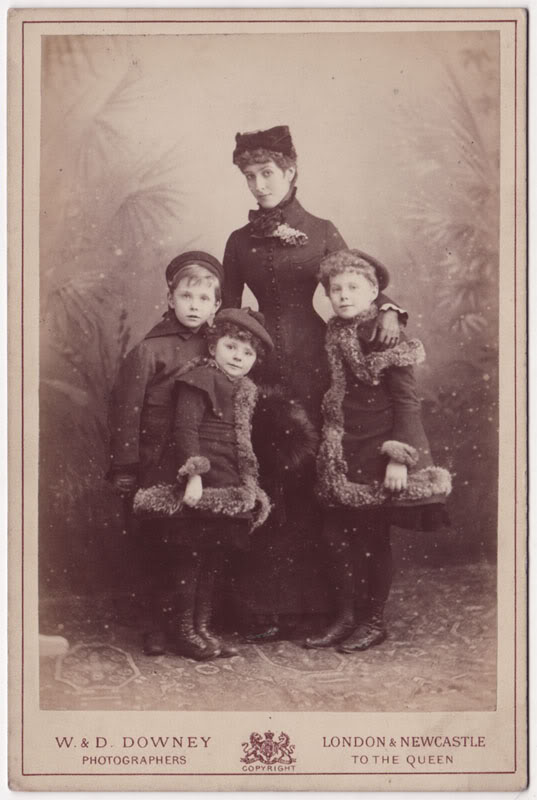
Daisy with her mother and siblings

Her sister Constance (Shelagh) was also a famous beauty and wife of one of the richest men in the world, Hugh Grosvenor, 2nd Duke of Westminster; and the sisters' brother George Cornwallis-West was the second husband of Lady Randolph Churchill, mother of Sir Winston Churchill.

== Personal life and family ==
On 8 December 1891, in London, she married Hans Heinrich XV, 3rd Prince of Pless, Count of Hochberg, Baron of Fürstenstein (1861–1938), one of the wealthiest heirs in the German Empire. As the Cornwallis-West family was impoverished, the Hochbergs paid for and organised the wedding at St Margaret's Church in Westminster. Notable witnesses were Edward, Prince of Wales (later King Edward VII) and his wife Princess Alexandra of Denmark.

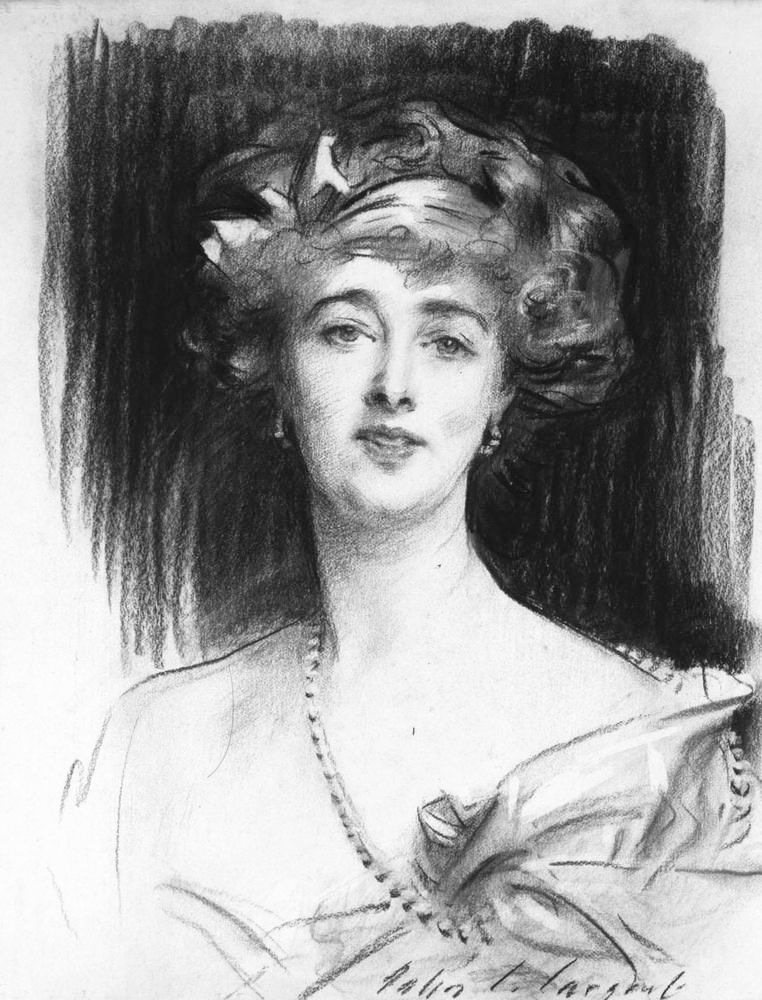
Undated sketch of Daisy by John Singer Sargent

During their honeymoon, the Princess was given the longest pearl necklace in the world by her husband.

The Princess was the châtelaine of Fürstenstein Castle and Pless Castle in Silesia, where she kept a domesticated wolf. The couple had four children:

- Daughter (25 February 1893 – 11 March 1893).
- Hans Heinrich XVII William Albert Edward (2 February 1900 – 26 January 1984), 4th Prince of Pless, Count von Hochberg and Baron of Fürstenstein. Married twice but had no issue.
- Alexander Frederick William George Conrad Ernest Maximilian (1 February 1905 – 22 February 1984), 5th Prince of Pless, Count von Hochberg and Baron of Fürstenstein. Polish military officer. Unmarried and childless.
- Bolko Conrad Frederick (23 September 1910 – 22 June 1936), who later caused a scandal by marrying his stepmother Clotilde de Silva y Gonzáles de Candamo (19 July 1898 – 12 December 1978), daughter of the 10th Marquis de Arcicóllar (and Hans Heinrich XV's second wife). Father of Bolko, 6th Prince.

== Peace campaigning and war work ==
During her marriage Daisy, known in German as the Fürstin von Pless, became a social reformer and militated for peace with her friends German Emperor Wilhelm II and King Edward VII of the United Kingdom.

During World War I she was suspected by Germans of being a British spy and was criticised by British people for treating German soldiers as a Red Cross nurse.

=== Honours ===
The Princess of Pless was a Dame of the Order of Theresa of Bavaria and of the Order of Isabella the Catholic of Spain, and was awarded the German Red Cross Decoration.

== Inter-war life ==
After her divorce at Berlin on 12 December 1922, Daisy was dependent upon alimony. In the same year Princess acquired Polish citizenship. Later she published a series of memoirs that were widely read in the United Kingdom, the United States, and, in the German language, in Continental Europe.

The Princess introduced pasteurised milk stations for children and founded a school for disabled children. She organised a cooperative for lace workers.

'The Private Diaries of Princess Daisy of Pless – 1873–1914, edited by Major Desmond Chapman-Huston, were first published in London by John Murray in 1931. This was the second selection from her diaries and, according to his introduction were from a series of diaries totalling 600,000 words. The diaries describe the Princess's life as a member of the European aristocracy, and include sometimes frank descriptions of significant pre-war political and social figures.

== World War II ==
Daisy moved to Wałbrzych, then known as Waldenburg, in 1941. To ease the Hochberg's debts, the Fürstenstein castle was sold by the family to the Nazi German government in 1943.

== Death and commemoration ==
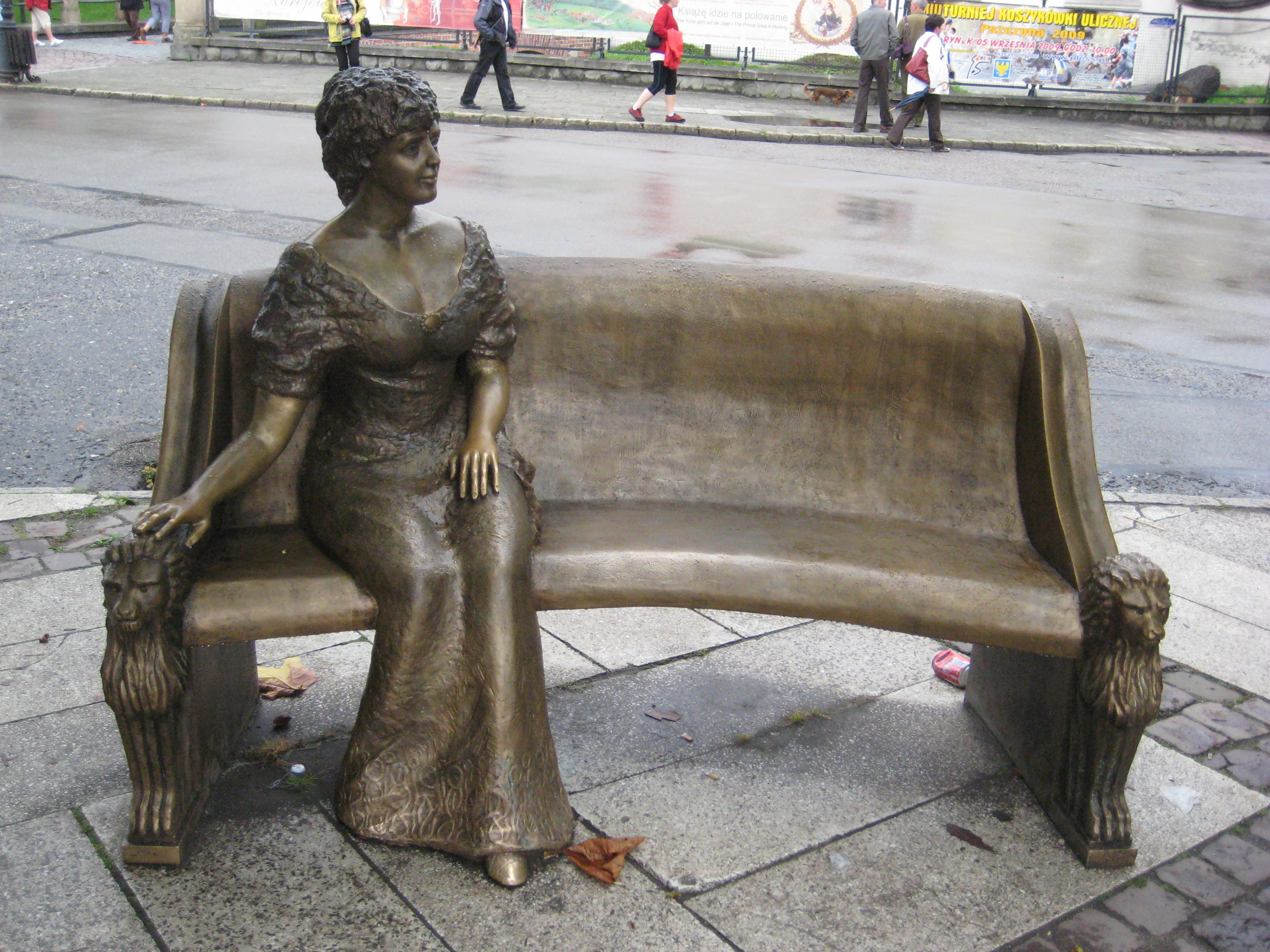
Memorial to Daisy in Pszczyna, Poland

Daisy had multiple sclerosis and used a wheelchair toward the end of her life. She celebrated her 70th birthday on 23 June 1943 with champagne and a colliery band performance. She died the next day, at Waldenburg, Silesia (now Wałbrzych, Poland).

The Princess was initially buried near the Hochberg family mausoleum. Her grave was plundered and her remains desecrated by Red Army soldiers in 1945, and she was reburied in an undisclosed location.

The Princess was commemorated by a statue near the castle Schloss Pless where she had lived for a time.

== Ancestry ==
Ancestors of Daisy, Princess of Pless

16. John West, 2nd Earl De La Warr
8. Frederick West
17. Mary Wynyard
4. Frederick Richard West
18. Richard Myddelton
9. Maria Myddelton
19. Elizabeth Rushout
2. William Cornwallis-West
20. Thomas Whitby
10. John Whitby
21. Mabella Turton
5. Theresa Whitby
22. Thomas Symonds
11. Mary Anne Symonds
23. Elizabeth Mallett
1. Daisy, Princess of Pless
24. Joseph FitzPatrick
12. Frederick FitzPatrick
25. Mary Persse
6. Frederick FitzPatrick
26. Thomas Stone
13. Edwina Stone
27. Anna Maria Edwin
3. Mary FitzPatrick
28. Thomas Taylour, 1st Marquess of Headfort
14. Thomas Taylour, 2nd Marquess of Headfort
29. Mary Quin
7. Lady Olivia Taylour
30. Sir John Stevenson
15. Olivia Stevenson
31. Anne Morton

== Notes ==
Citations

Sources

- Princess Daisy of Pless (1929). Princess Daisy of Pless by Herself. London, John Murray.
- Princess Daisy of Pless (1931). Better Left Unsaid. New York: E. P. Dutton.
- Princess Daisy of Pless (1936). What I Left Unsaid. New York: Cassell.
- Chapman-Huston, D (1931). The Private Diaries of Princess Daisy of Pless - 1873 - 1914. London: John Murray. republished 1950
- Koch, John (2003). Daisy Princess of Pless 1873-1943: A Discovery. W. John Koch Publishing. ISBN 0-9731579-0-9.
