= Duchess of Westminster =

Title in the Peerage of the United Kingdom

Duchess of Westminster is a title given to the wife of the Duke of Westminster, an extant title in the Peerage of the United Kingdom which was created in 1874 by Queen Victoria. The incumbent is Olivia Henson, wife of Hugh Grosvenor, 7th Duke of Westminster, since their marriage in 2024.

== List of Duchesses of Westminster ==
#	Portrait	Name	Birth	Marriage	Became Duchess of Westminster	Spouse	Death	Ceased being Duchess of Westminster	Reason ceased being Duchess
1		Constance Sutherland-Leveson-Gower	16 June 1834	28 April 1852	27 February 1874	Hugh Grosvenor, 1st Duke of Westminster	19 December 1880		Died
2		Katherine Cavendish	1857	19 July 1882		Hugh Grosvenor, 1st Duke of Westminster	19 December 1941	22 December 1899	Husband's death
3		Constance Cornwallis-West	16 May 1875	16 February 1901		Hugh Grosvenor, 2nd Duke of Westminster	21 January 1970	19 December 1919	Divorce
4		Violet Nelson	1891	26 November 1920		Hugh Grosvenor, 2nd Duke of Westminster	21 January 1970	1926	Divorce
5		Loelia Ponsonby	6 February 1902	20 February 1930		Hugh Grosvenor, 2nd Duke of Westminster	1 November 1993	1947	Divorce
6		Anne Sullivan	13 April 1915	7 February 1947		Hugh Grosvenor, 2nd Duke of Westminster	31 August 2003	19 July 1953	Husband's death
7		Sally Perry	1909	11 April 1945	19 July 1953	Gerald Grosvenor, 4th Duke of Westminster	30 May 1990	25 February 1967	Husband's death
8		Viola Lyttelton	10 June 1912	3 December 1946	25 February 1967	Robert Grosvenor, 5th Duke of Westminster	3 May 1987	19 February 1979	Husband's death
9		Natalia Phillips	8 May 1959	7 October 1978	19 February 1979	Gerald Grosvenor, 6th Duke of Westminster	Alive	9 August 2016	Husband's death
10		Olivia Henson	1 September 1992	7 June 2024		Hugh Grosvenor, 7th Duke of Westminster	Incumbent		

== Unmarried Dukes of Westminster ==
- William Grosvenor, 3rd Duke of Westminster, died in 1963, unmarried and childless. Therefore, there was no Duchess consort during this period.
