= George Cornwallis-West =

British Army officer (1874-1951)

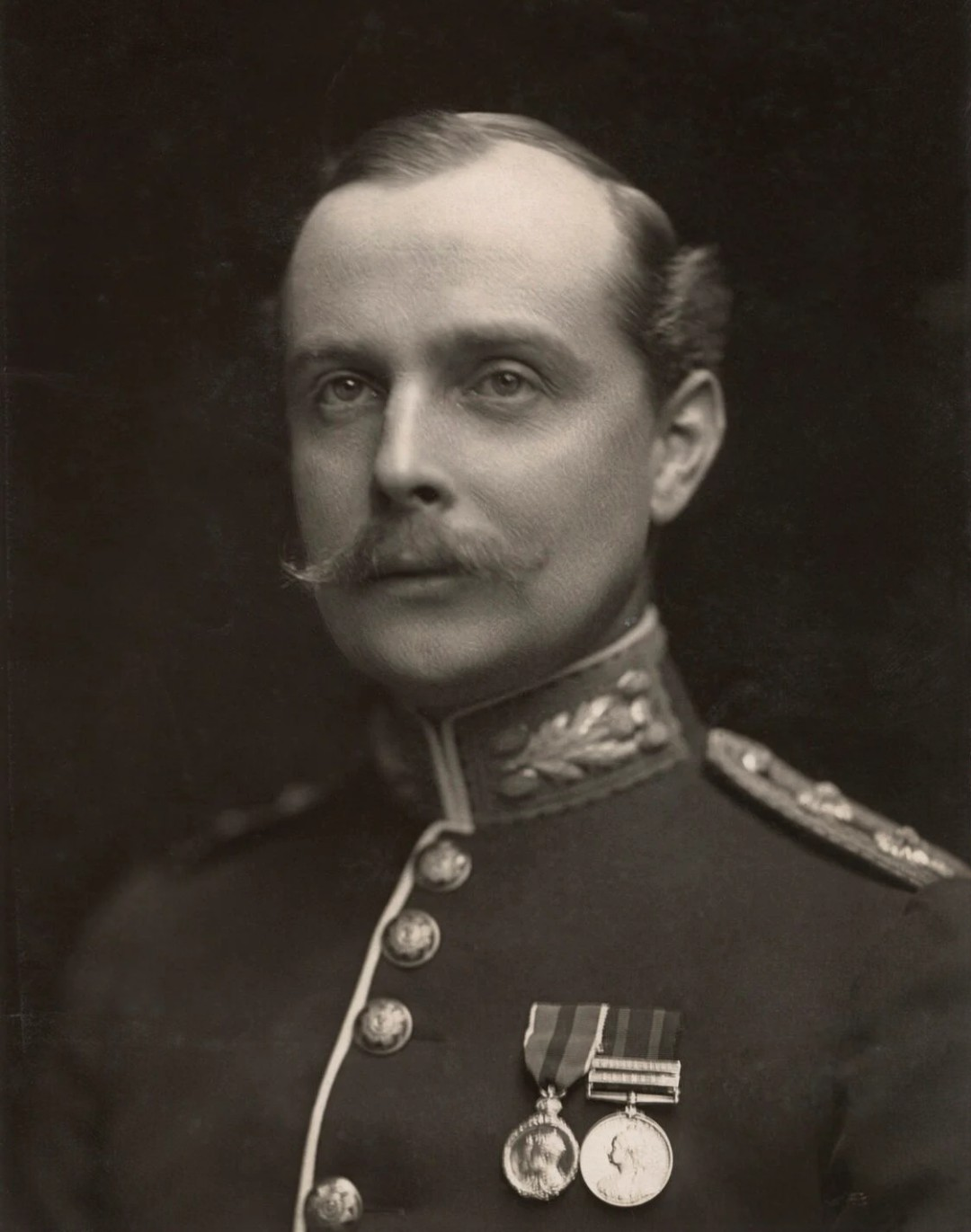
- Born: 14 November 1874; Ruthin, Denbighshire, Wales
- Died: 1 April 1951 (aged 76); Mayfair, London, England
- Spouses: Lady Randolph Churchill (m. 1900; div. 1914); Mrs Patrick Campbell (m. 1914; died 1940)
- Parents: William Cornwallis-West (father); Mary "Patsy" FitzPatrick (mother)
- Relatives: Mary Theresa Cornwallis-West (sister); Constance Cornwallis-West (sister); Hans Heinrich XV, Prince of Pless (brother-in-law); Hugh Grosvenor, 2nd Duke of Westminster (brother-in-law)
- Military career
- Allegiance: United Kingdom
- Branch: British Army
- Service years: 1895–1924
- Rank: Major
- Units: Scots Guards
- Conflicts: Second Boer War; First World War

Major George Frederick Myddleton Cornwallis-West, JP (14 November 1874 – 1 April 1951) was a British Army officer, historian and writer. He was noted primarily for his marriages, the first to Lady Randolph Churchill, mother of Winston Churchill, and the second to the actress Stella Campbell, who was also known on the stage as Mrs Patrick Campbell. During his marriage to Jennie Jerome Churchill, George Cornwallis-West was noted for being only 16 days older than his stepson Winston Churchill.

== Early life ==
George Cornwallis-West was born on 14 November 1874. He was the only son of Colonel William Cornwallis-West (1835–1917) and his wife, Mary "Patsy" FitzPatrick (1856–1920).

== Military career ==
Cornwallis-West served in the Scots Guards, becoming a lieutenant. He went on half pay on 8 August 1900, returned briefly to his regiment and then went on half pay again on 5 September. Cornwallis-West resigned his commission on 26 October 1901 and then joined the Reserve of Officers as a lieutenant on 26 February 1902. On 7 November 1914 Cornwallis-West was given a temporary commission as a lieutenant-colonel in the Royal Marines. He resigned this rank, with which he had served in the Royal Naval Division, on 19 January 1915.

He was promoted to captain in the Scots Guards on 18 October, an earlier promotion to that rank in January having later been cancelled. By 16 February 1917, Cornwallis-West was serving as an assistant provost marshal and he was listed as part of the Reserve of Officers; he was still in that position on 23 October. On 1 October 1918, he was made a temporary major for his work as a provost marshal.

Continuing in the Reserve of Officers after the end of the First World War, Cornwallis-West left his position as a provost marshal, and reverted to his substantial rank of captain, on 13 November 1919. He was then promoted to major on 9 February 1920. He retired from the army on 14 November 1924, having reached the age limit for reserve officers.

== Personal life ==
Cornwallis-West and Lady Randolph Churchill were married on 28 July 1900. The wedding was held at St Paul's Church, Knightsbridge. They separated in 1912 and divorced on 1 April 1914, but continued to meet socially upon occasion. After their divorce, she returned to her former name: Lady Randolph Churchill. On 6 April 1914, Cornwallis-West married Beatrice Stella Tanner Campbell, an actress known (under her previous husband's name) as "Mrs Patrick Campbell". George Bernard Shaw wrote the part of Eliza Doolittle in his play Pygmalion for her.

Cornwallis-West's elder sister, née Mary Theresa Cornwallis-West, was a noted society beauty. Known as Daisy, Princess of Pless, she was the first wife of Hans Heinrich XV, Prince of Pless. His younger sister, Constance, became the first wife of Hugh Grosvenor, 2nd Duke of Westminster.

In 1951, aged 76, after having been afflicted for many years with Parkinson's disease, Cornwallis-West committed suicide in his apartment at 9 North Audley Street, Westminster, leaving an estate valued for probate at £12,255. He left no legitimate children.

== Portrayals in film and television ==
Cornwallis-West was portrayed by Christopher Cazenove in the 1974 Thames TV mini-series Jennie: Lady Randolph Churchill.
