= Bourdon House =

Building in Mayfair, London, England

Coordinates: 51°30′39″N 00°08′49″W

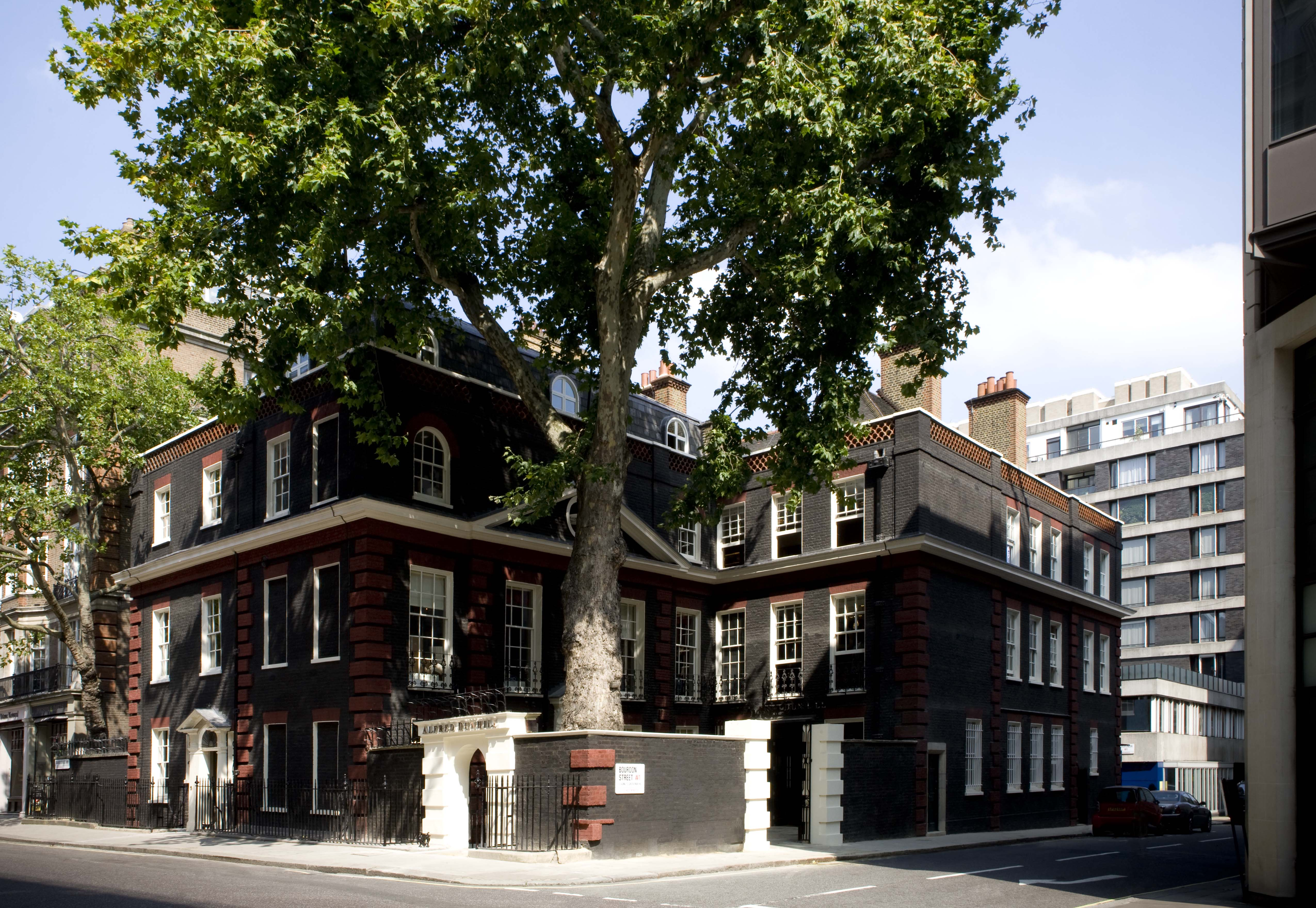
Bourdon House in 2008

Bourdon House is a Grade II* listed building in Mayfair, London, at the junction of Davies Street and Bourdon Street.

The house is believed to be named after Captain William Bourdon, described as the Justice of the Peace for Middlesex, though this name does not appear in any contemporary military records. It was surveyed by Thomas Barlow, and constructed between 1723 and 1725. The house was extended northwards around 1737. There were originally two stories and an attic, with a further storey added around 1760. Much of the house's interior dates from this period.

Bourdon lived in the house until 1727, after which it was occupied by Bacon Morris, Governor of the Landguard Fort, Suffolk. The politician and officer Timothy Caswall lived in Bourdon House from 1764 to 1767, then from 1772 until his death in 1802. Subsequently, his daughter lived there until her death in 1830.

The house was renovated in the 1860s and 1870s, including the addition of a fourth storey. A wing to the east of the premises was constructed in the early 20th century. The last private residents were Hugh Grosvenor, 2nd Duke of Westminster, who lived there from 1917 until his death in 1953, and his fourth wife, Anne Grosvenor, Duchess of Westminster who moved out in 1957. The Duke held a particular affinity for the house, which he preferred as a residence over Grosvenor House. Following the Duchess' departure, it became used for commercial purposes, initially as an antique shop.

The property was listed in 1958.
