= Shelagh Grosvenor, Duchess of Westminster =

British peeress and socialite (1877–1970)

Her Grace The Duchess of Westminster CBE
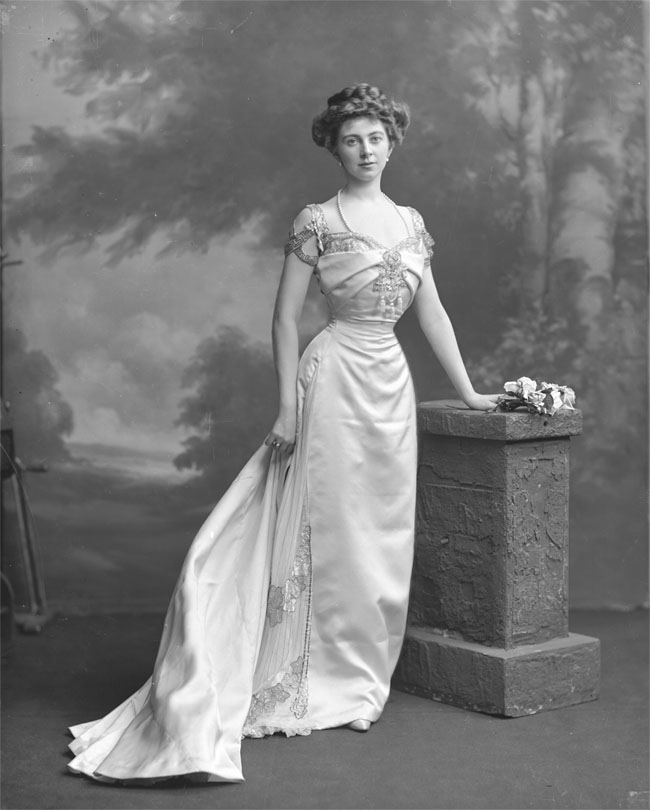
- Shelagh Westminster in 1906
- Born: Constance Edwina Cornwallis-West; 16 May 1877; Ruthin Castle, Denbighshire, Wales
- Died: 21 January 1970 (aged 92); New Forest District, Hampshire, England
- Spouses: Hugh Grosvenor, 2nd Duke of Westminster (m. 1901; div. 1919) John Fitzpatrick Lewis (m. 1920)
- Children: 3; Lady Mary Grosvenor (daughter)
- Parents: Col. William Cornwallis-West (father); Mary "Patsy" FitzPatrick (mother)
- Relatives: Daisy, Princess of Pless (sister); George Cornwallis-West (brother)

Medal record

Sailing

Representing Great Britain

Olympic Games
Bronze medal – third place	1908 London	8 Metre

Constance Edwina Grosvenor, Duchess of Westminster, CBE (née Cornwallis-West; 16 May 1877 – 21 January 1970), known as Shelagh Westminster, was a British peeress and socialite.

== Early life ==
Constance Edwina ("Shelagh") Cornwallis-West was the youngest child of Col. William Cornwallis-West and Patsy Cornwallis-West. Her father was member of parliament for Denbighshire West and served as Lord-Lieutenant of Denbighshire from 1872 to 1917. Her Irish mother was known as a great beauty and leading socialite. She was very close to her sister, Daisy, Princess of Pless. Her brother was George Cornwallis-West, stepfather of Winston Churchill.

== Olympic career ==
The Duchess was one of only two women to compete in sailing at the 1908 Summer Olympics as owner and extra crewmember of the 8-metre bronze medal-winning yacht Sorais. She distributed the diplomas of special merit to the competitors of the other Olympic sports on 25 July 1908.

== Personal life ==
At a party at Blenheim Palace, Patsy Cornwallis-West asked the Prince of Wales (later King Edward VII) to convince Hugh Grosvenor, 2nd Duke of Westminster to marry her daughter. The pair were married on 16 February 1901 and moved into Grosvenor House on Park Lane, a mansion that the Duke had inherited from his grandfather. Later they lived together at Eaton Hall, Cheshire. The Duke was one of the richest men in the world. Together, they had three children:

- Lady Ursula Mary Olivia Grosvenor (1902–1978), whose descendants are the only descendants of the Duchess and the Duke.
- Edward George Hugh Grosvenor, Earl Grosvenor (1904–1909), who died young.
- Lady Mary Constance Grosvenor (1910–2000), who never married and became a motor racing and rally driver.

The marriage was happy at first, and the couple shared many interests, including yachting and motor racing. However, her parents' expectation of personal financial gain through the marriage and her own long absence from home affected her marriage to the conservative Duke.

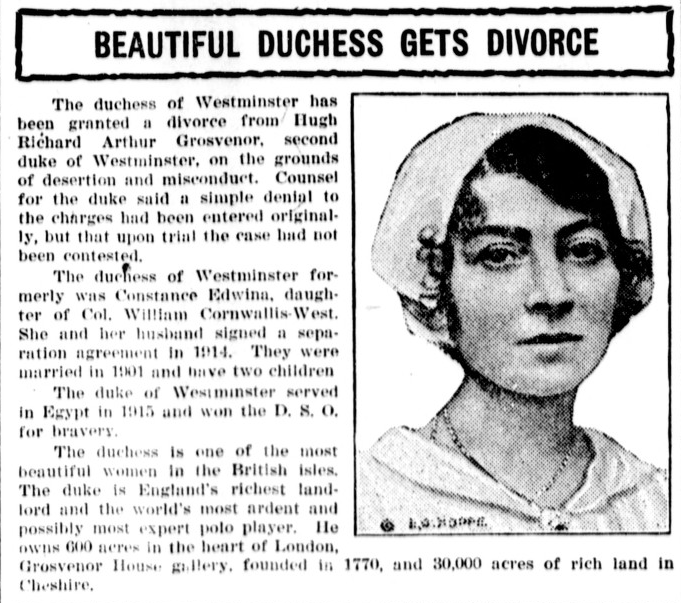
"Beautiful Duchess Gets Divorce" (12 July 1919)

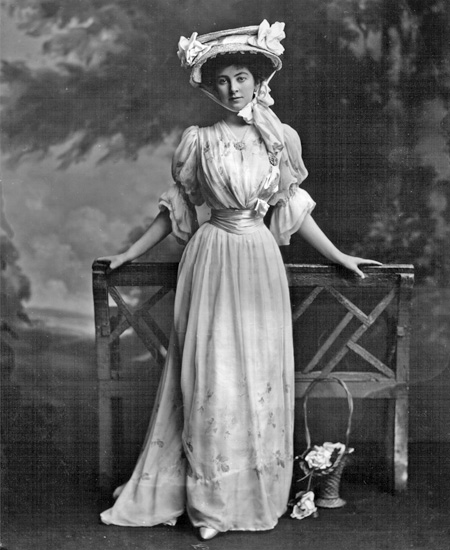
The Duchess of Westminster in 1902

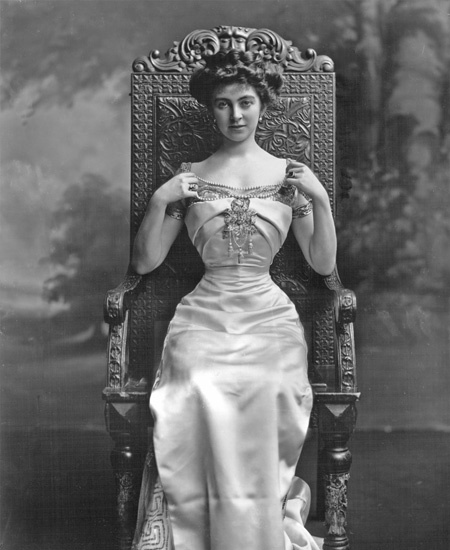
The Duchess in 1907

In 1909, the couple's only son and heir apparent to the dukedom died following an operation for appendicitis while the Duchess was away. The Duke accused her of neglecting the child, and the Duchess did not attend the boy's funeral. It was rumoured that the Duchess was having a secret liaison with the Duke of Alba, whilst her husband had what he described as his own "nocturnal adventures". Nonetheless, the couple appeared together at social events until the birth of their youngest child, Lady Mary. In 1913, the Duke requested a separation, but with the outbreak of the First World War, the couple turned their attention to war service – the Duke joined his regiment, and the Duchess sponsored a military hospital in Le Touquet, housed in a local casino.

In 1918, the Duchess was created a Commander of the Order of the British Empire for her service in the war. The couple were divorced – on the grounds of the Duke's adultery and desertion – the following year, with the decree being made absolute 19 December 1919. The alimony settlement of £13,000 a year he made upon her was then the largest in British legal history.

After their divorce, the Duke married three more times, including to Violet Cripps, Baroness Parmoor, Loelia, Lady Lindsay, and Anne Grosvenor, Duchess of Westminster. The couple remained on friendly terms after 1919, hosting their daughters' debut balls together. Because their subsequent interactions were amicable, it has been surmised that both parties collaborated to achieve the divorce because each wanted to end the marriage and remarry.

=== Second marriage ===
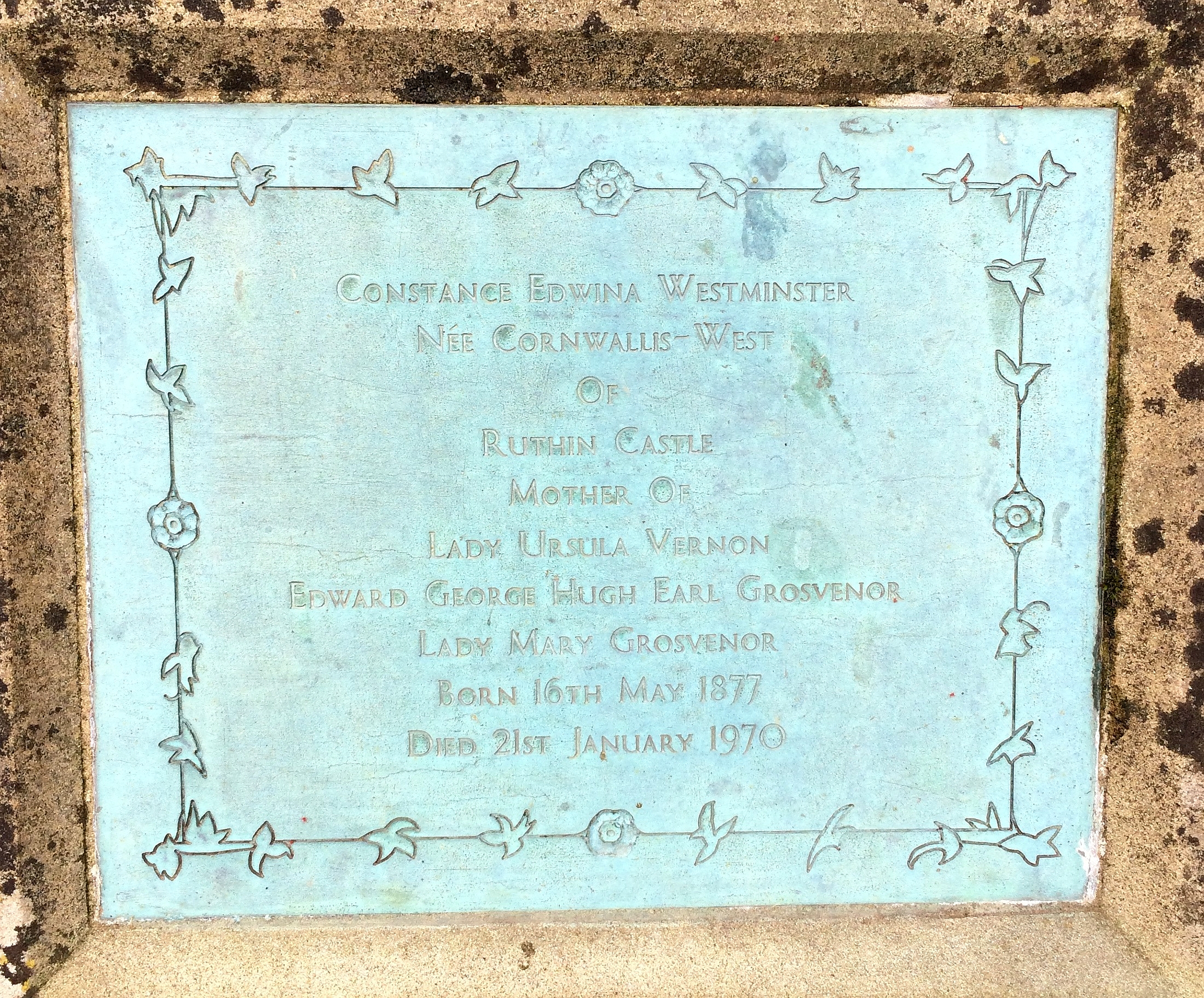
St Mary's Church, Eccleston, Old Churchyard – plaque commemorating Constance Edwina (née Cornwallis-West, 1877−1970)

On 14 January 1920, less than one month after her divorce from the duke was finalized, Constance Lewis, then aged 44, secretly married her private secretary, Captain John Fitzpatrick Lewis, then in his thirties, at Lyndhurst, Hampshire. She had met Lewis early in the war, while he was being treated at her hospital in Le Touquet. They had no children.

The former duchess died on 21 January 1970, aged 94.

== In popular culture ==
Dennis Wheatley dedicated his 1961 thriller Vendetta in Spain to her.
