= Anne Grosvenor, Duchess of Westminster =

British peeress (1915–2003)

Her Grace The Duchess of Westminster

Personal details
- Born: Anne Winifred Sullivan; 13 April 1915
- Died: 31 August 2003 (aged 88)
- Spouse: Hugh Grosvenor, 2nd Duke of Westminster (m. 1947; died 1953)
- Parent(s): Edward Sullivan; Winifred Burns

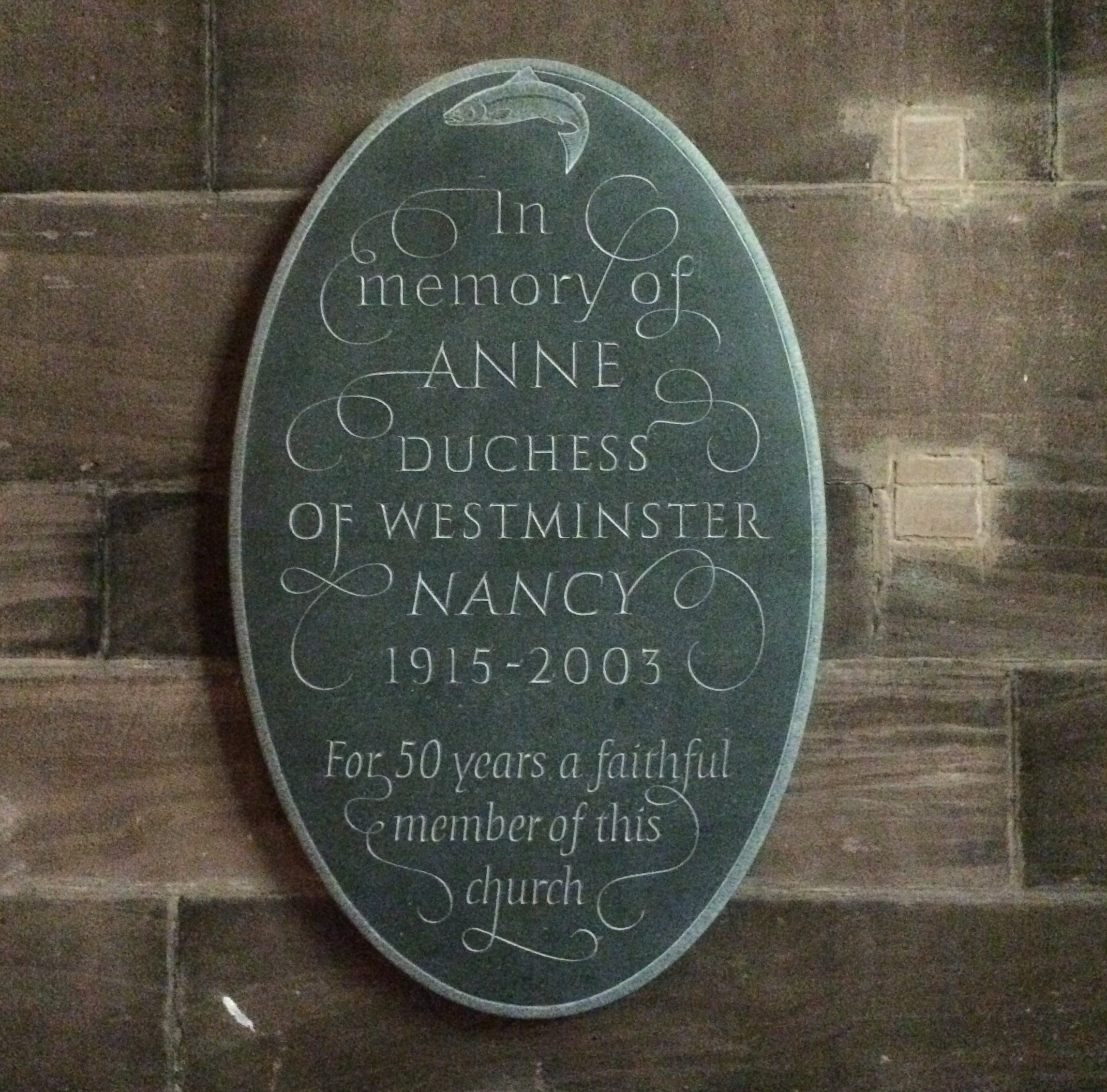
Memorial to Anne Winifred "Nancy" (née Sullivan), widow of 2nd Duke of Westminster, in St Mary's Church, Eccleston

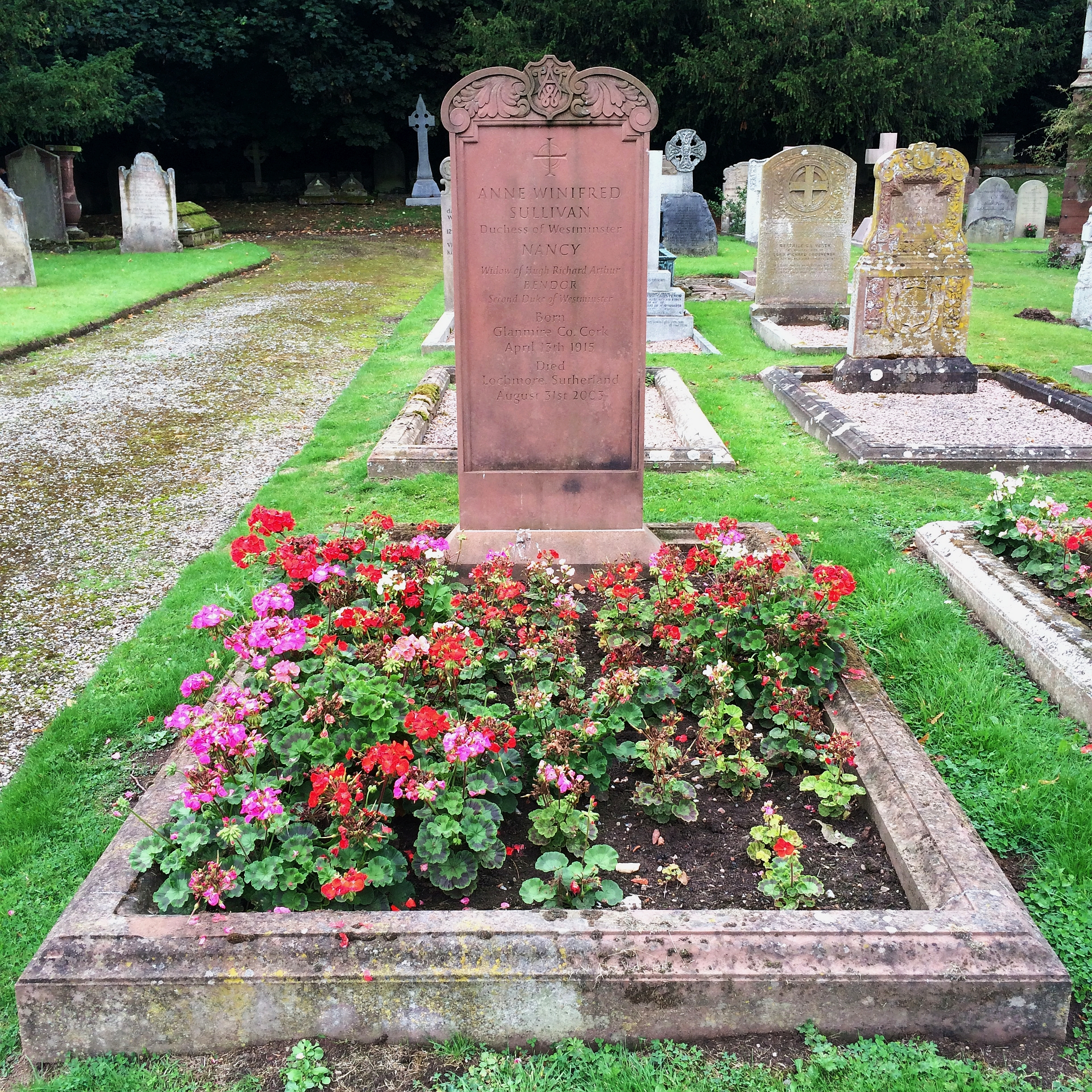
Grave of Anne Winifred "Nancy" (née Sullivan), widow of 2nd Duke of Westminster

Anne Winifred Grosvenor, Duchess of Westminster (née Sullivan; 13 April 1915 – 31 August 2003), known as Nancy, was an Irish-born widow of a peer best known for her passion for horse racing.

== Early life ==
Her parents were Brigadier-General Edward Sullivan and his wife Winifred (née Burns). She spent her early life in Glanmire, County Cork, Ireland growing up with two brothers, Adam and George, and practising her riding skills.

When the Second World War broke out, Anne Sullivan volunteered for the First Aid Nursing Yeomanry and served six years as personnel driver, while her brother, Adam, was killed during the Norway campaign. After the war, she returned home to Ireland to stay with her father, and met Hugh Grosvenor, 2nd Duke of Westminster, in 1946. The enormously rich Duke, then married to his third wife Loelia but long separated, immediately bought property next to her family's home and asked his agent to ask Miss Sullivan to help with the flowers.

== Duchess of Westminster ==
The 68-year-old Duke soon obtained divorce and Sullivan became his fourth wife on 7 February 1947. The new Duchess of Westminster was far wealthier than her three predecessors. The first of them, Constance Cornwallis-West, was the mother of the Duke's children, all of whom were older than the Duchess herself. The couple spent most of their time at Eaton Hall in Cheshire and at Lochmore. They went to Norway every year, as the Duchess enjoyed fishing, farming, stalking, hunting and racing. In June 1953, the Duke and Duchess attended the coronation of Queen Elizabeth II. She was widowed the next month and retired to Eaton Lodge, where she spent the next 50 years of her life.

The Duchess and her stepdaughter, Lady Mary ranked eighth among the wealthiest landowners in Scotland after inheriting 120,000 acres from the 2nd Duke.

Anne, Duchess of Westminster, was a great fan of horse racing, and is notable as the owner of Last Suspect (winner of the 1985 Grand National) and Arkle (winner of the Cheltenham Gold Cup (1964, 1965, 1966).

Through racing, she became a friend of Queen Elizabeth The Queen Mother. The Duchess was elected president of the Chester and West Cheshire branch of the Royal Society for the Prevention of Cruelty to Animals and actively took part in its work, while also supporting the establishment of the Clwyd Riding School for the Disabled. She died at Lochmore and was buried in the churchyard of Eccleston Church near Eaton Hall, Cheshire.

== See also ==
- List of Grand National winners
