= Lady Mary Grosvenor =

British racing driver (1910–2000)

- Born: Mary Constance Grosvenor; 27 June 1910
- Died: 7 June 2000 (aged 89)
- Parents: 2nd Duke of Westminster (father); Constance Cornwallis-West (mother)
- Nationality: British
- Retired: 1953
- Years active: 1937–1939, 1946, 1951
- Wins: 0
- Best finish: 2nd in two races

Lady Mary Constance Grosvenor (27 June 1910 – 7 June 2000) was a British motor racing and rally driver.

== Early life ==
Lady Mary was the younger daughter and youngest child of one of the richest men in the world, Hugh Grosvenor, 2nd Duke of Westminster, and his first wife, Constance Cornwallis-West. Along with her sister Lady Ursula, she was raised by nurses and governesses at the family seat, Eaton Hall, Cheshire. Her parents divorced when she was ten years old. The Duke of Westminster, who went on to remarry three more times, had a keen interest in yachts which helped spark his daughter's own passion for sailing.

== Racing ==
Grosvenor was a keen sportswoman and racing driver, competing on rallies such as the Royal Automobile Club (RAC) and Royal Scottish Automobile Club (RSAC) in the 1930s. She used two Riley Sprites for pre-war hillclimbs, then switched in 1947 to a Bugatti T35; an Alta and Frazer Nash Le Mans Replica. She took part in seven competitions, racing three times at Goodwood Circuit, three times at Donington Park and once at Gransden Lodge Airfield. Lady Mary competed in an SS 90 in torrential rain in the first Shelsley Walsh hillclimb after World War II.

== Estate ==
Lady Mary ran farms in Kenya and Shropshire, a house in Cheshire and the family's large Highland estate. She retired in 1953 after her father's death, in order to manage her estates in South Africa, Kenya and Scotland. Lady Mary and her father's last wife Anne inherited 120,000 acres from the 2nd Duke and ranked eighth among the wealthiest landowners in Scotland.

== Personal life ==
Lady Mary never married and lived mainly at Kylestrome in Scotland and at the Westminster estate in the Orange Free State of South Africa, given to her by her father in the 1930s. She outlived three more dukes of Westminster (the 5th Duke died in 1979) and died aged 89.
