= Visitation with Saint Nicholas and Saint Anthony =

C. 1490 painting by Piero di Cosimo

- Artist: Piero di Cosimo
- Year: c.1490
- Medium: oil on panel
- Dimensions: 184.2 cm × 188.6 cm (72.5 in × 74.3 in)
- Location: National Gallery of Art, Washington

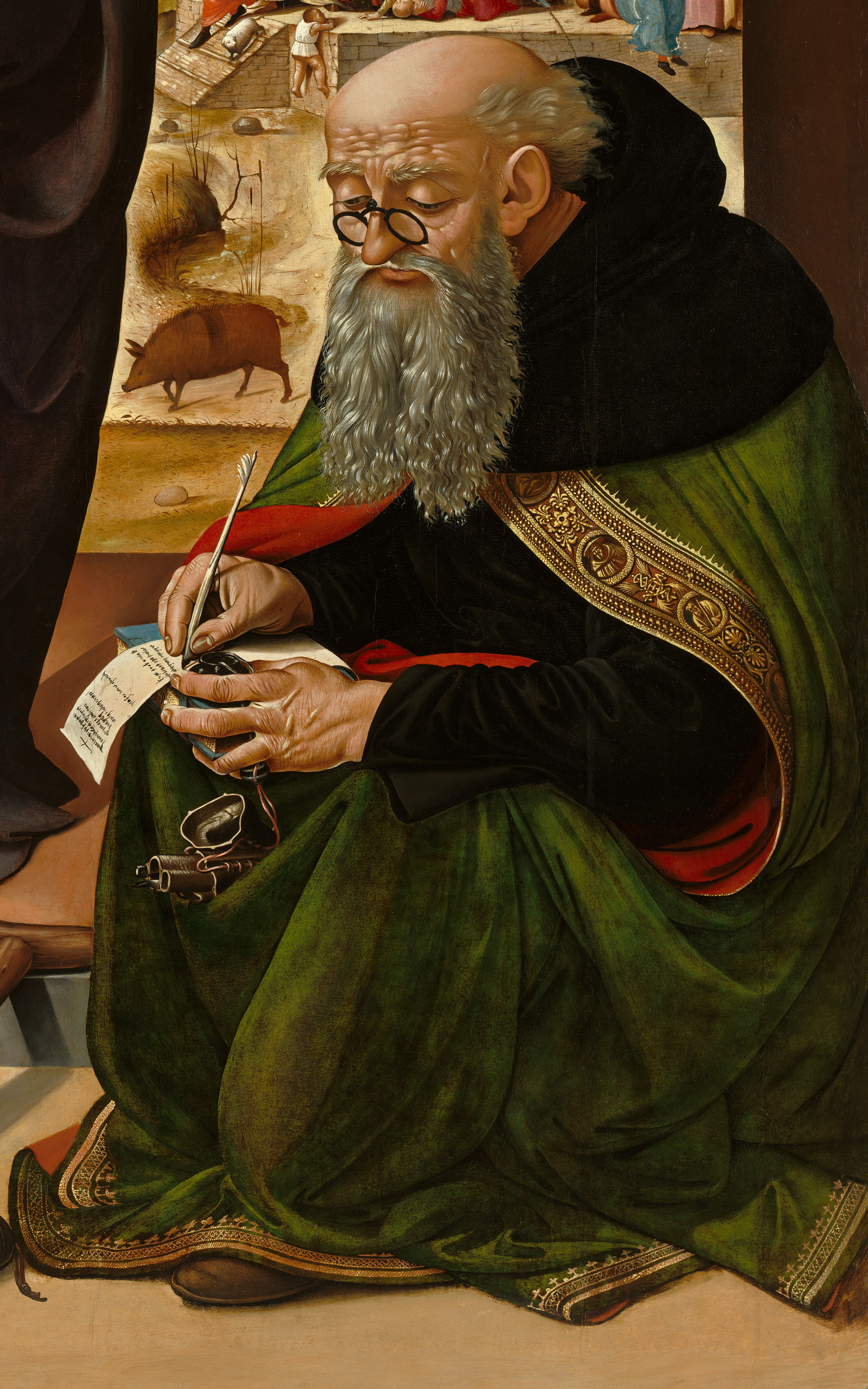
Detail

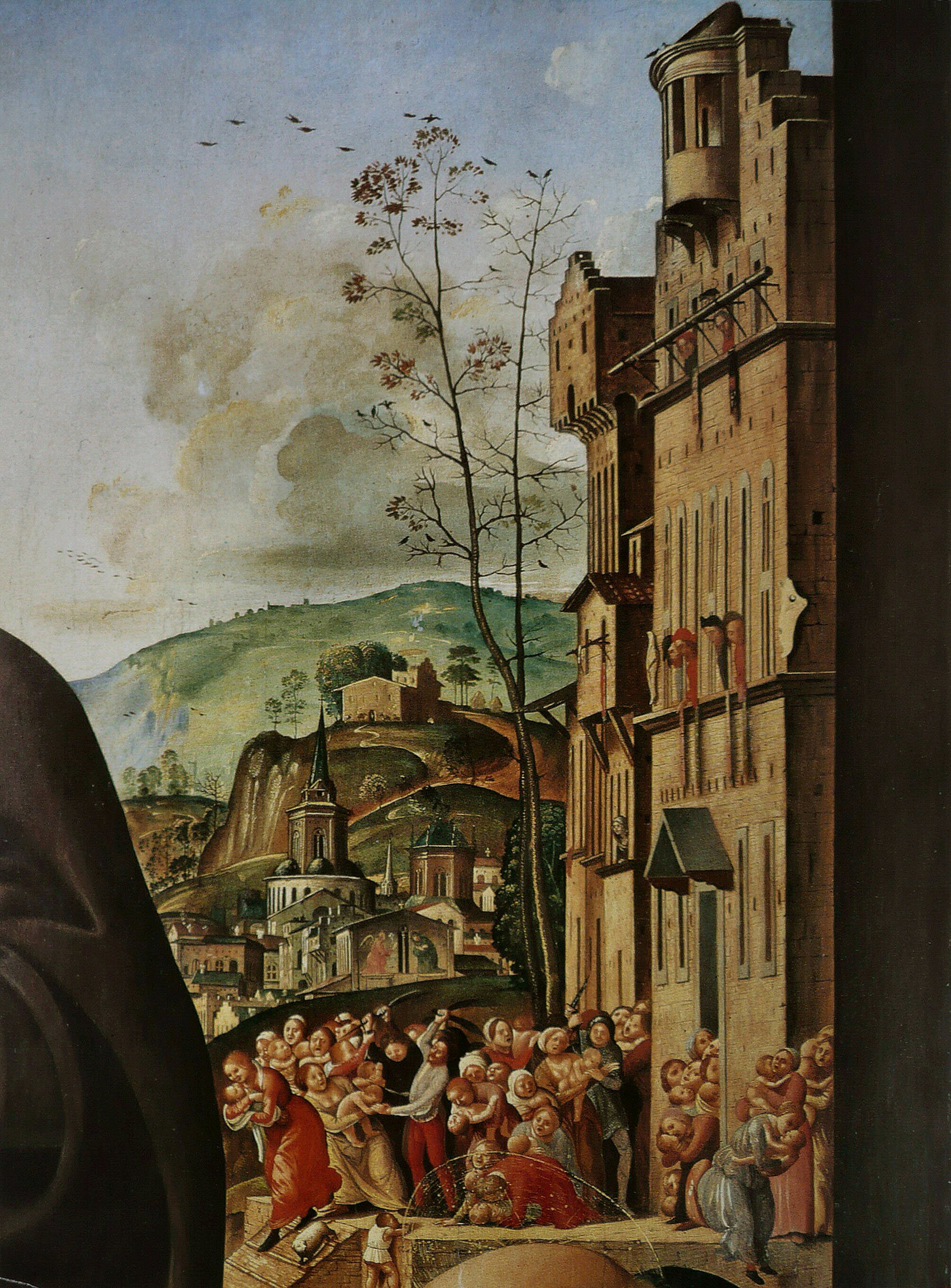
Detail of the Massacre of the Innocents and Landscape with an Annunciation

Visitation with Saint Nicholas and Saint Anthony is a c.1490 oil on panel painting by Piero di Cosimo, now in the National Gallery of Art of Washington. It shows Saint Nicholas and Saint Anthony either side of a Visitation scene.

Commissioned between 1489 and 1490 by the Capponi family for the Cappella di San Niccolò in the Basilica of Santo Spirito in Florence, the work was described in the Lives of the Artists as "A Visitation of Our Lady with Saint Nicholas and a Saint Anthony with a pair of glasses on his nose which is very good." In 1713 it was moved to the Villa Capponi in Legnaia, where it was seen and acquired by Frederick West around 1850. West took it to Chirk Castle in Wales, from which his descendants sold it in 1891. After a number of intermediate owners, it was acquired by the Duveen Brothers of New York, who in 1937 passed it to Samuel H. Kress, who gave it to the National Gallery of Art in 1939.
