= Ruthin Castle =

Castle in Denbighshire, Wales

Coordinates: 53.1117°N 3.3118°W

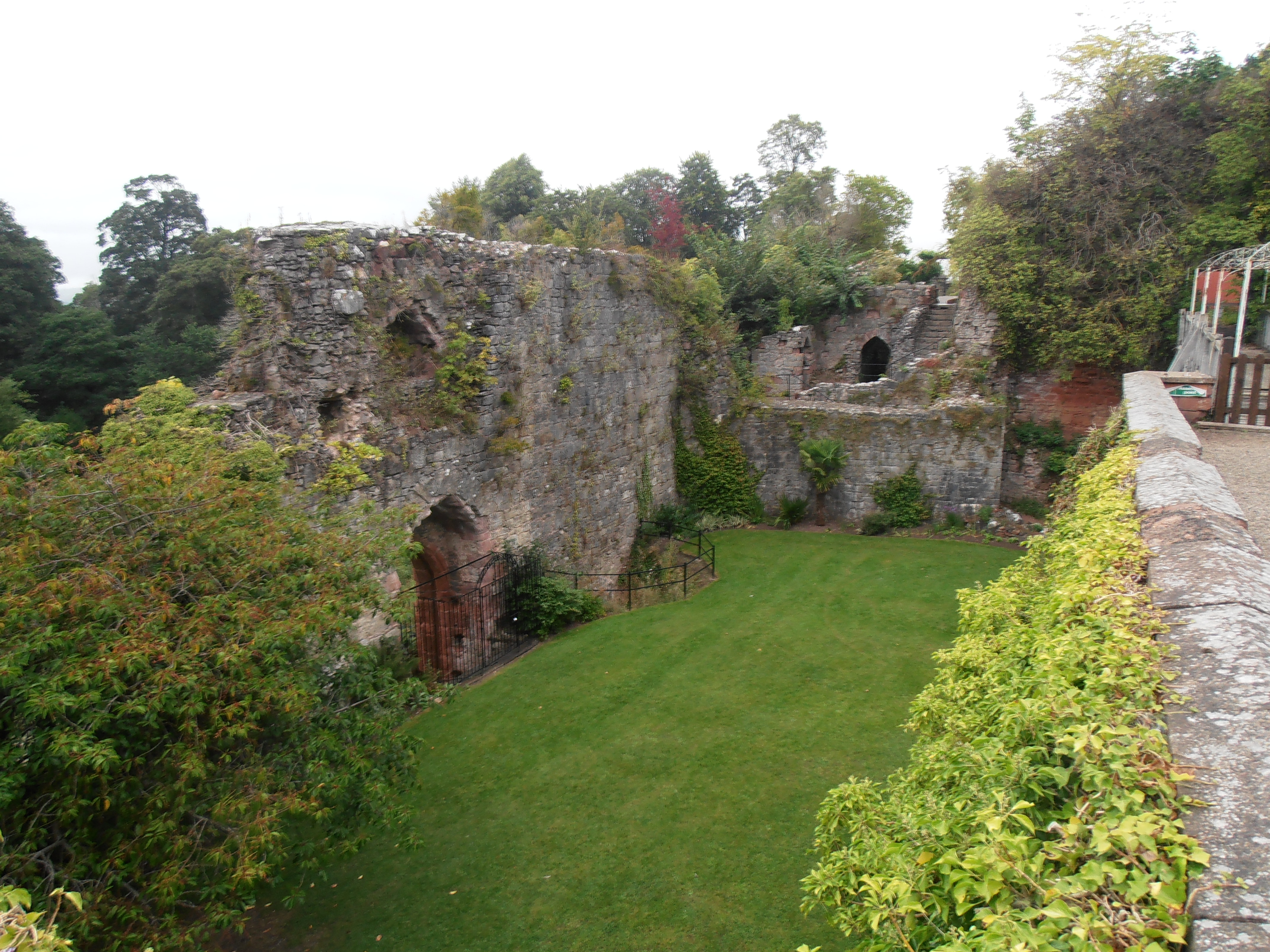
The medieval ruins

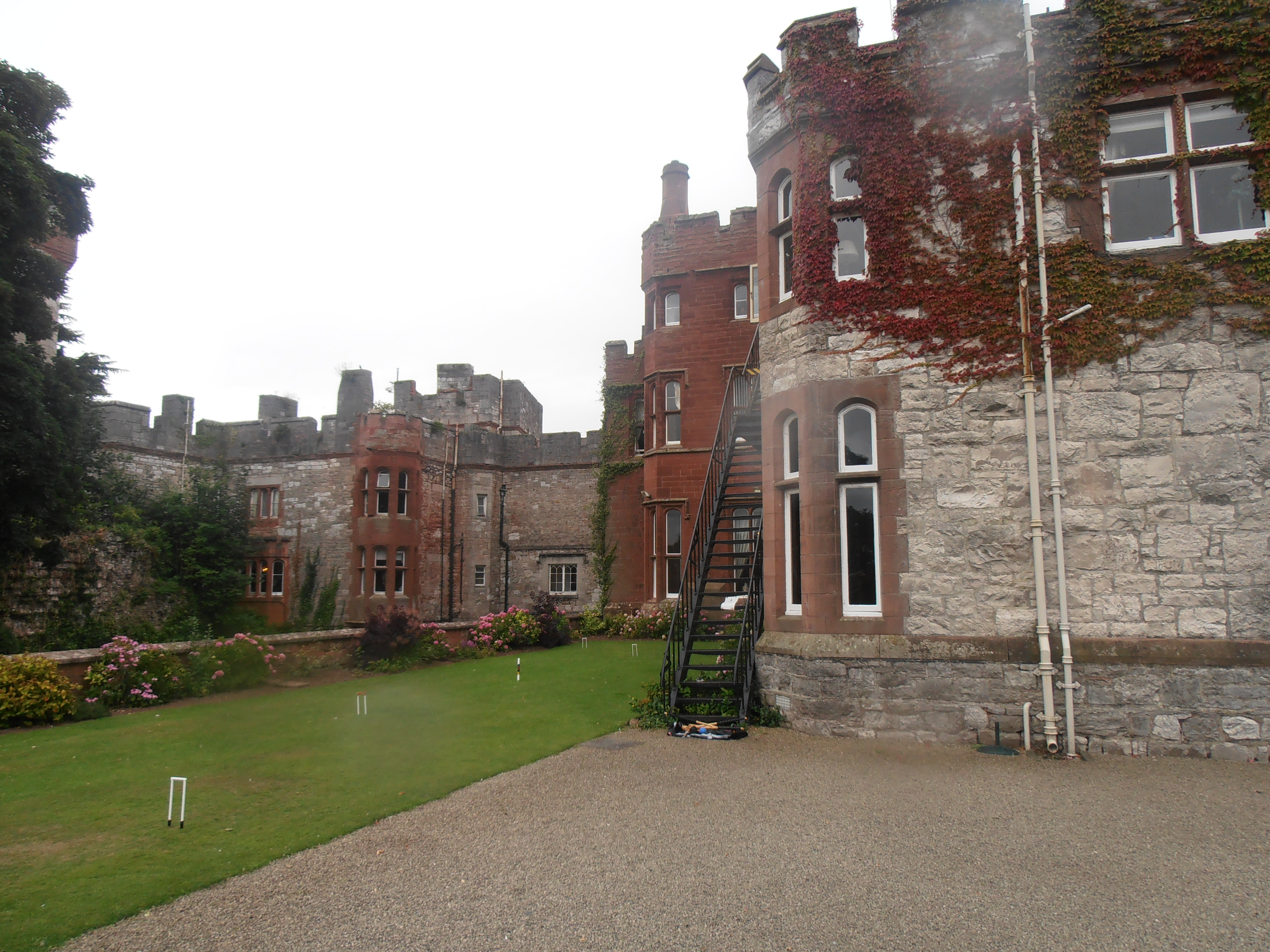
The new Castell Rhuthun (Ruthin Castle) hotel; attached to the old castle

Ruthin Castle (Welsh: Castell Rhuthun) is a medieval castle fortification in Wales, near the town of Ruthin in the Vale of Clwyd. It was constructed during the late 13th century by Dafydd ap Gruffydd, the brother of Prince Llywelyn ap Gruffudd, on a red sandstone ridge overlooking the valley. Part of the ancient walls still remain and now form part of the Ruthin Castle Hotel.

== History ==
Ruthin Castle occupies a site that was first used as an Iron Age fort. In 1277, Edward I of England granted the land to Dafydd ap Gruffydd in gratitude for his assistance during the invasion of North Wales. It is unclear whether there was an existing fort on the site or whether Dafydd established the castle. The castle was originally given the Welsh name of Castell Coch yn yr Gwernfor (Welsh Red Castle in the Great Marsh).

The castle was most notably the base of that branch of the noble de Grey family accorded the title "Barons Grey de Ruthyn" and the head of their marcher lordship of Dyffryn Clwyd. It was a base for Reginald Grey, 3rd Baron Grey de Ruthyn – the man who could be said to have sparked the rebellion of Owain Glyndŵr.

Between 1579 and 1580, the Castle was used for the imprisonment and torture of Welsh poet, recusant schoolmaster Richard Gwyn, who was hanged, drawn, and quartered at Wrexham on 15 October 1584. Gwyn was canonized in 1970 by Pope Paul VI as one of the Forty Martyrs of England and Wales.

At the start of the English Civil War the castle was in a state of disrepair and the necessary works were hastily performed to make it defensible. It withstood an eleven-week siege by parliamentary troops in 1646 before surrendering when the attackers announced that they intended to lay mines under the walls. Oliver Cromwell's forces later dismantled and demolished the castle, in a process of organised de-fortification called slighting.

== In modern times ==
In 1923 the castle became Britain's first private hospital for the investigation and treatment of obscure internal diseases, but this was closed in about 1950. Since the 1960s the castle remains have been incorporated into a hotel. A guest was Prince Charles, who stayed for the night before his investiture as Prince of Wales at Caernarfon Castle in 1969. The castle is said to be haunted; because of this reputation, it was investigated by the paranormal investigation show Most Haunted in 2018.
