= Hugh Grosvenor, 2nd Duke of Westminster =

British noble (1879–1953)

Colonel His Grace The Duke of Westminster GCVO DSO
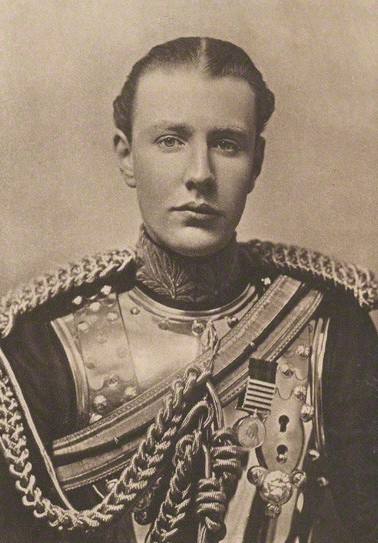
- The Duke in 1903

Lord Lieutenant of Cheshire Custos Rotulorum of Cheshire
- In office 19 December 1905 – 15 April 1920
- Monarchs: Edward VII; George V
- Preceded by: Earl Egerton
- Succeeded by: Sir William Bromley-Davenport

Member of the House of Lords as Duke of Westminster
- In office 20 March 1900 – 19 July 1953
- Preceded by: The 1st Duke of Westminster
- Succeeded by: The 3rd Duke of Westminster

Personal details
- Born: Hugh Richard Arthur Grosvenor; 19 March 1879 Eaton Hall, Cheshire, United Kingdom
- Died: 19 July 1953 (aged 74) Loch More, Sutherland, United Kingdom
- Spouses: Constance Cornwallis-West (m. 1901; div. 1919) Violet Nelson (m. 1920; div. 1926) Loelia Ponsonby (m. 1930; div. 1947) Anne Sullivan (m. 1947)
- Children: Lady Ursula Vernon; Edward Grosvenor, Earl Grosvenor; Lady Mary Grosvenor
- Parent(s): Victor Grosvenor, Earl Grosvenor; Lady Sibell Lumley

Hugh Richard Arthur Grosvenor, 2nd Duke of Westminster, GCVO, DSO (19 March 1879 – 19 July 1953), was a British landowner who supported Nazi ideology and had an affair with French designer Coco Chanel.

== Early life ==
Hugh was the son of Victor Grosvenor, Earl Grosvenor (1853–1884), the predeceased son of Hugh Grosvenor, 1st Duke of Westminster, and Lady Sibell Lumley (1855–1929), daughter of Richard Lumley, 9th Earl of Scarbrough. His mother later remarried the politician George Wyndham.

He attended St. David's prep school in Reigate and after completing his education at Eton, he briefly attended a French boarding school run by Count de Mauny at the age of nineteen. There were rumors suggesting that the count had made inappropriate advances toward some of his pupils.

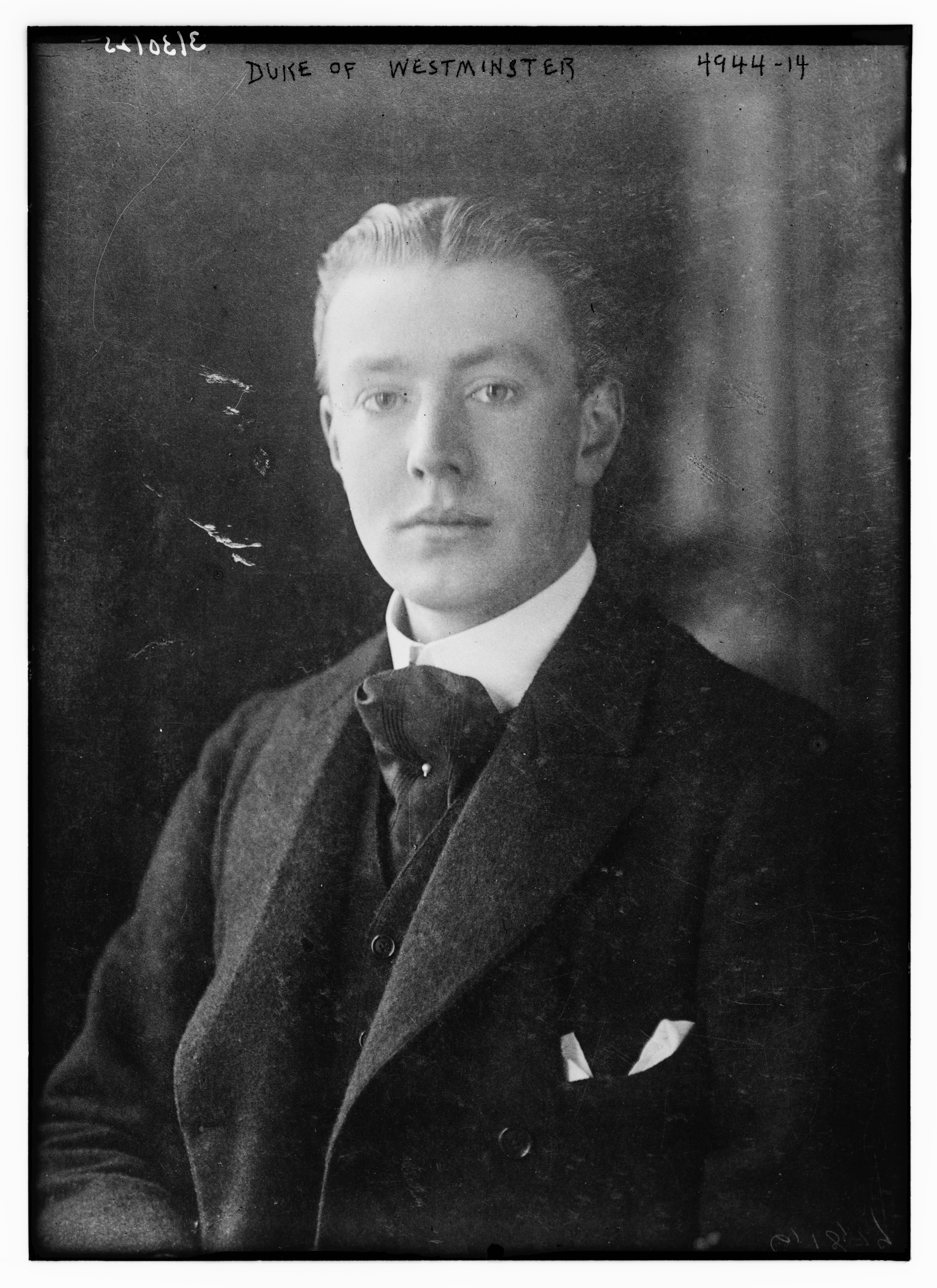
The Duke of Westminster (1915)

Grosvenor was known within family circles as "Bendor", which was also the name of the racehorse Bend Or, owned by his grandfather. Bend Or won The Derby in 1880, the year following Grosvenor's birth. The name is a reference to the ancient lost armorials of the family: Azure, a bend or, which were awarded to the Scrope family in the famous case of 1389 heard before the Court of Chivalry, known as Scrope v Grosvenor. His wife Loelia wrote in her memoirs:

Of course everybody, even his parents and sisters, would normally have addressed the baby as "Belgrave" so they may have thought that any nickname was preferable. At all events it stuck, and my husband's friends never called him anything but "Bendor" or "Benny".

== Estate ==
His ancestral country estate was in Cheshire with a 54-bedroom Eaton Hall, consisting of 11,000 acres (45 km^{2}) of parkland, gardens, and stables. The main residence contained paintings by Goya, Rubens, Raphael, Rembrandt, Hals, and Velázquez, among others. The Duke owned lodges in Scotland and France (the Château Woolsack) dedicated to the sport of hunting. According to his The Times obituary (21 July 1953), "he was busy up to the day of his death in great schemes of afforestation in Cheshire, in the Lake District, and in Scotland."

He owned two yachts, the Cutty Sark and the Flying Cloud. He owned 17 Rolls-Royce motor cars and a private train designed to facilitate travel from Eaton Hall directly into London, where his palatial townhouse, named Grosvenor House, was located.

Grosvenor House was closed as a private residence by December 1916, and was later leased to the United States for use as the American Embassy. By 1917, Bendor was occupying another Grosvenor property, Bourdon House on Davies Street in Mayfair, which remained as his London home for the rest of his life.

== Military service ==
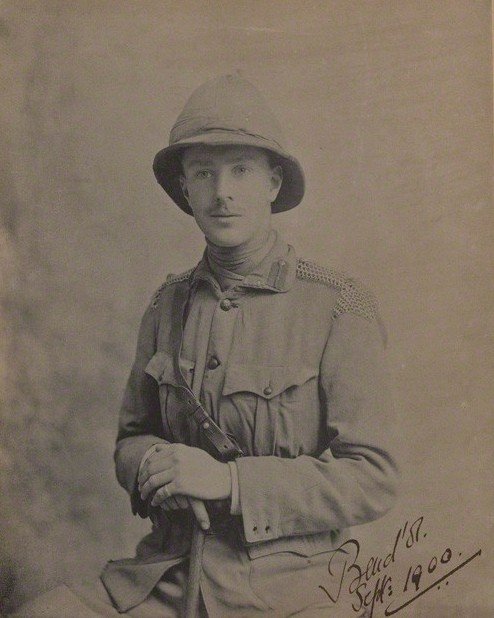
The Duke c. 1900

Lord Belgrave (as he was known) was on 14 November 1898 commissioned a second lieutenant in the Cheshire (Earl of Chester's) Yeomanry, a volunteer cavalry regiment where his grandfather was the honorary colonel. He went to South Africa as aide-de-camp (ADC) to the Governor of Cape Colony, Lord Milner, and was thus in that area at the outbreak of the Second Boer War in October 1899. After a brief visit home following his succession to the dukedom, he returned in February 1900 to serve with the Imperial Yeomanry, and was promoted to lieutenant in the Cheshire Yeomanry (later renamed Cheshire Imperial Yeomanry) on 11 April 1900. From August 1900 he was commissioned with the Royal Horse Guards, though continued as staff officer as an ADC to Lord Roberts, Commander-in Chief. He resigned his commission in the Horse Guards in December 1901, and was appointed captain in the Cheshire Imperial Yeomanry the following month. After the war, he invested in land in South Africa and Southern Rhodesia, and visited the colony with his wife in late 1902. He was promoted to major in the Cheshire Yeomanry in 1906.

In 1908, the Duke competed in the London Olympics as a motorboat racer for Great Britain. On 1 April 1908, he was named honorary lieutenant-colonel of the 16th Battalion, the London Regiment, a post he held until 1915.

During the First World War, the Duke volunteered for front-line combat. While attached to the Cheshire Yeomanry, he developed a prototype Rolls-Royce armoured car for use in France and Egypt. The Duke commanded the armoured cars of the regiment during their 1916 Senussi campaign in Egypt as part of the Western Frontier Force under General William Peyton. He took part in the destruction of a Senussi force at the action of Agagia on 26 February 1916.

On 14 March 1916, he led the armoured cars on a raid, destroying the enemy camp at Bir Asiso. Learning that the crews of HMT Moorina and HMS Tara were being held in poor conditions at Bir Hakeim, he led the nine armoured cars, together with three armed but un-armoured cars and a further 28 cars and ambulances, on the Bir Hakeim rescue: a 120-mile (190 km) dash across the desert. The Senussi captors attempted to run away but British rescuers shot them. The prisoners attempted to stop the killings but failed. They had subsisted on little more than the snails in which the region abounded, but said their captors had not been overly cruel. However, the chief jailor responsible for the snail diet, a Muslim cleric nicknamed "Holy Joe", was hanged on general approval.

== Awards and honours ==
- Distinguished Service Order for his exploits in 1916. He was subsequently promoted to colonel, and on 26 May 1917, he was named honorary colonel of the Cheshire Yeomanry.
- He was appointed Knight Grand Cross, Royal Victorian Order (G.C.V.O.) in 1907.
- He held the office of Lord-Lieutenant of Cheshire between 1907 and 1920.

== Affair with Coco Chanel ==
In Monte Carlo in 1923, Grosvenor was introduced to Coco Chanel by Vera Bate Lombardi. His affair with Chanel lasted ten years. The Duke gave her jewels and art, purchased a home for Chanel in London's Mayfair district, and in 1927 gave her a parcel of land on the French Riviera at Roquebrune-Cap-Martin where Chanel built her villa, La Pausa.

Westminster's technique in the courting of women led to various apocryphal stories. He purportedly concealed a huge uncut emerald at the bottom of a crate of vegetables delivered to Chanel. Disguised as a deliveryman, Westminster appeared at Chanel's apartment with a bouquet of flowers.

== Political ideology ==
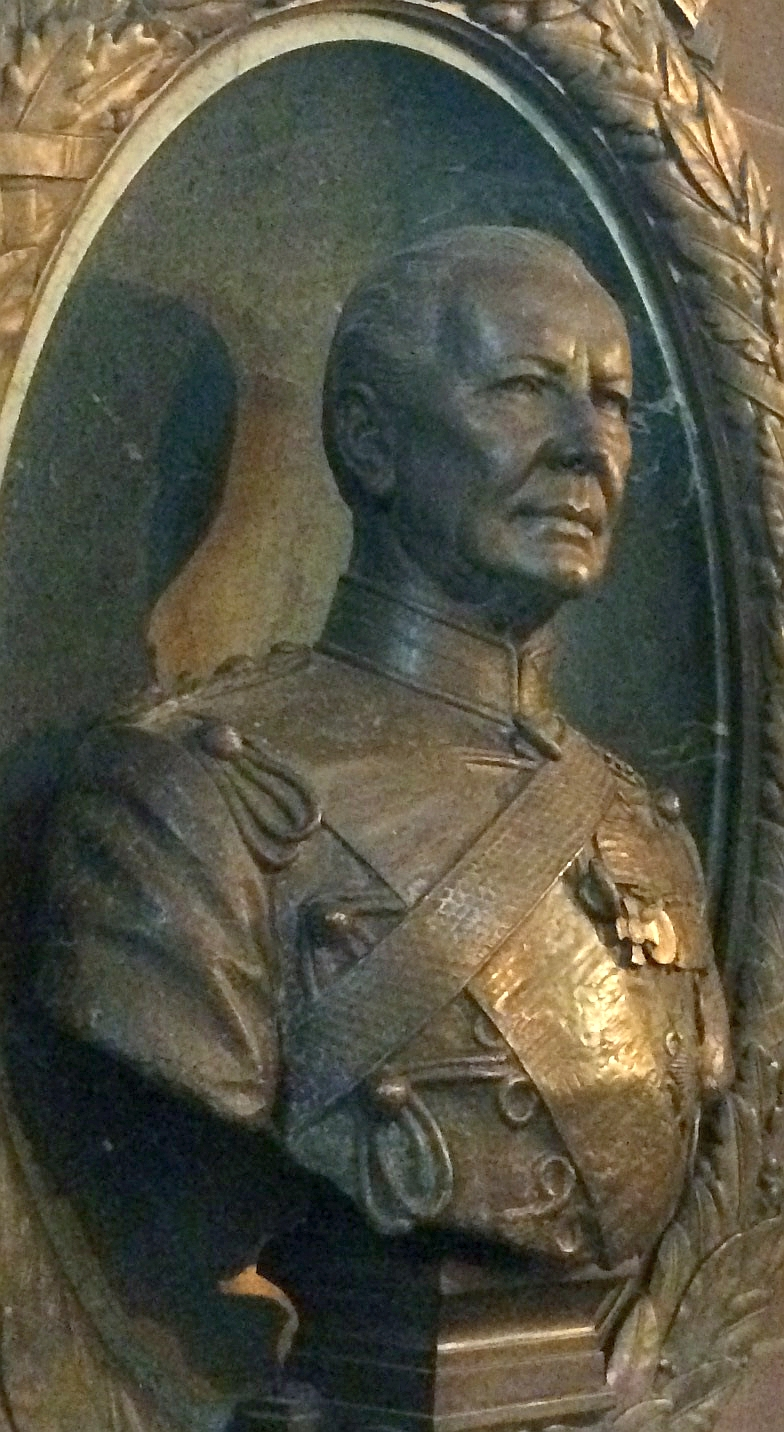
The 2nd Duke's portrait bust at St Mary's Church, Eccleston

The Duke was described as "a pure Victorian who had eyes for his shotgun, his hunters, his dogs ... a man who enjoyed hiding diamonds under the pillow of his mistresses …" He was known for being very conservative and, later, right wing.

The Duke was notable for being opposed to homosexuality. In 1931, the Duke exposed his brother-in-law William Lygon, 7th Earl Beauchamp (1872–1938) as a homosexual to the King and Queen. He reportedly hoped to ruin the Liberal Party through Beauchamp. The King was horrified, supposedly saying, "I thought men like that shot themselves." Following Beauchamp's departure for the continent after the Duke had assembled sufficient evidence to incriminate him, forcing the Earl to resign his public offices, the Duke sent him a note which read, "Dear Bugger-in-law, you got what you deserved. Yours, Westminster."

During the run-up to the Second World War, he supported various right-wing and antisemitic causes, including the Right Club. His antisemitic rants were notorious.

In the summer of 1939, Westminster joined The Link as a member of its national council. The British historian Ian Kershaw wrote that Westminster "had a propensity to share some of the Nazis' delusions about Jews and Freemasons", which led him to join The Link. During the Danzig crisis, Westminster was said to have been especially concerned about the prospect of the German strategical bombing of London because he owned so much of central London. Along with Lord Mount Temple, Lord Brocket, the Duke of Buccleuch, Lord Mottistone, Lord Arnold, Lord Sempill and Lord Tavistock, the Duke lobbied the Chamberlain government to settle the Danzig crisis peacefully, preferably by Britain abandoning the commitment to defend Poland. The British historian Richard Griffiths described Westminster as being both "strongly pro-Nazi and anti-Semitic". Griffiths described him as a member of a "hard core" pro-Nazi faction in the House of Lords, who continued to defend Nazi Germany in the summer of 1939, even as the Danzig crisis pushed Britain closer to war. The main theme of the speeches of Westminster along with other pro-Nazi peers such as Lord Redesdale, Lord Brocket, the Duke of Buccleuch, Lord Mottistone, and Lord Sempill, was that Britain had no business being involved in the Danzig crisis and should withdraw from the crisis to allow Germany to settle its dispute with Poland in whatever manner it wished to do. In contrast to the unelected House of Lords, there were few MPs in the House of Commons who defended Germany in the summer of 1939, owing to the increasing unpopularity of Nazi Germany. Even pro-German MPs realised expressing such views might cost them their seats in the next general election. Griffiths described the pro-Nazi MPs during the Danzig crisis such as Archibald Ramsay and Cyril Culverwell as "eccentrics".

In her book The Light of Common Day, Lady Diana Cooper reminisced back to 1 September 1939. She and her husband, the prominent Conservative Duff Cooper, were lunching at London's Savoy Grill with the Duke of Westminster. She recalled:

When he [the Duke of Westminster] added that Hitler knew after all that we were his best friends, he set off the powder-magazine. "I hope", Duff spat, "that by tomorrow he will know that we are his most implacable and remorseless enemies". Next day "Bendor", telephoning to a friend, said that if there was a war it would be entirely due to the Jews and Duff Cooper.

Britain declared war on Nazi Germany on 3 September 1939, two days after the German invasion of Poland. Later that month, Westminster hosted two meetings at his house with various pro-Nazi peers and MPs. In this meeting, they discussed a way to make a negotiated peace with Germany. The Foreign Secretary, Lord Halifax, heard reports that the meetings at Westminster's house were "of a very defeatist character".

The Duke, known for his pro-German sympathies, was reportedly instrumental in influencing his former mistress, Coco Chanel, to use her association with Winston Churchill to attempt to broker a bilateral peace agreement between Britain and Germany. In late 1943 or early 1944, Chanel and her lover, German spy Hans Günther von Dincklage, undertook such an assignment. Codenamed "Operation Modellhut", it was an attempt involving the British embassy in Madrid and Chanel to influence Churchill, and thereby persuade the British government to negotiate a separate peace with Germany. This mission as planned ultimately met with failure, as Churchill had no interest.

== Marriages and affairs ==
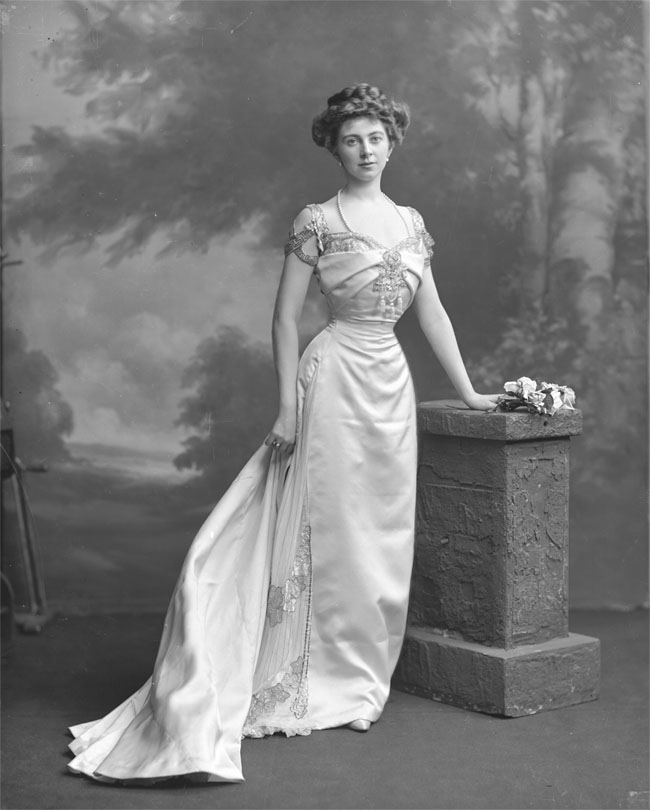
The Duke's first wife, Shelagh, in 1902

The Duke was married four times and was divorced thrice.

1. He married Constance Edwina ("Shelagh") Cornwallis-West (1876–1970), a distant cousin, on 16 February 1901. In 1909, when the couple's only son died in the absence of his mother, the Duke accused his wife of neglecting the child while dallying with other men. By 1913, the couple were living apart, and both of them were consorting with lovers. Their divorce was finalized on 19 December 1919, with the Duke solely accepting blame for adultery and paying his wife an annual settlement of £13,000 (equivalent to £580,360 in 2025), the largest in British legal history to that date. Less than one month after the divorce, the Duchess married a much younger man who was an employee of the Duke. The divorced couple maintained cordiality lifelong, even co-hosting debutante balls for their daughters; neither of them had children by their subsequent marriages. They had three children together:
  - Lady Ursula Mary Olivia Grosvenor (21 February 1902 – 1978)
  - Edward George Hugh Grosvenor, Earl Grosvenor (1904–1909), who died aged 4, after an operation for appendicitis.
  - Lady Mary Constance Grosvenor (27 June 1910 – 2000).
2. His second marriage was held on 26 November 1920, when the Duke became the second husband of Violet Mary Nelson (1891–1983). They had no children together and were divorced in 1926.
3. His third wife was Loelia Mary Ponsonby (1902–1993), whom he married on 20 February 1930. The couple were unable to have children and divorced in 1947 after several years of separation.
4. His fourth wife was Anne (Nancy) Winifred Sullivan (1915–2003), whom he married on 7 February 1947. They had no children, and she outlived him by fifty years.

Apart from his four marriages, the Duke had multiple love affairs and was known to make presents to his lover of the moment. After his dalliance with Coco Chanel, he was fascinated by the Brazilian Aimée de Heeren, who was not interested in marrying him, but to whom he gave significant jewelry, once part of the French Crown Jewels.

== Death and succession ==
The Duke died of coronary thrombosis at Loch More Lodge on his Scottish estate in Sutherland in July 1953, aged 74. He was buried in the churchyard of Eccleston Church near Eaton Hall, Cheshire following his death.

His large estate attracted then-record death duties of £18,000,000, which took between July 1953 and August 1964 to pay off to the Inland Revenue.

He was survived by two daughters. His titles and the entailed Westminster estate passed to his cousin, William Grosvenor, and thence to the two sons of his youngest half-uncle Lord Hugh Grosvenor (killed in action in 1914). The title passed in 2016 to Hugh Grosvenor, 7th Duke of Westminster.

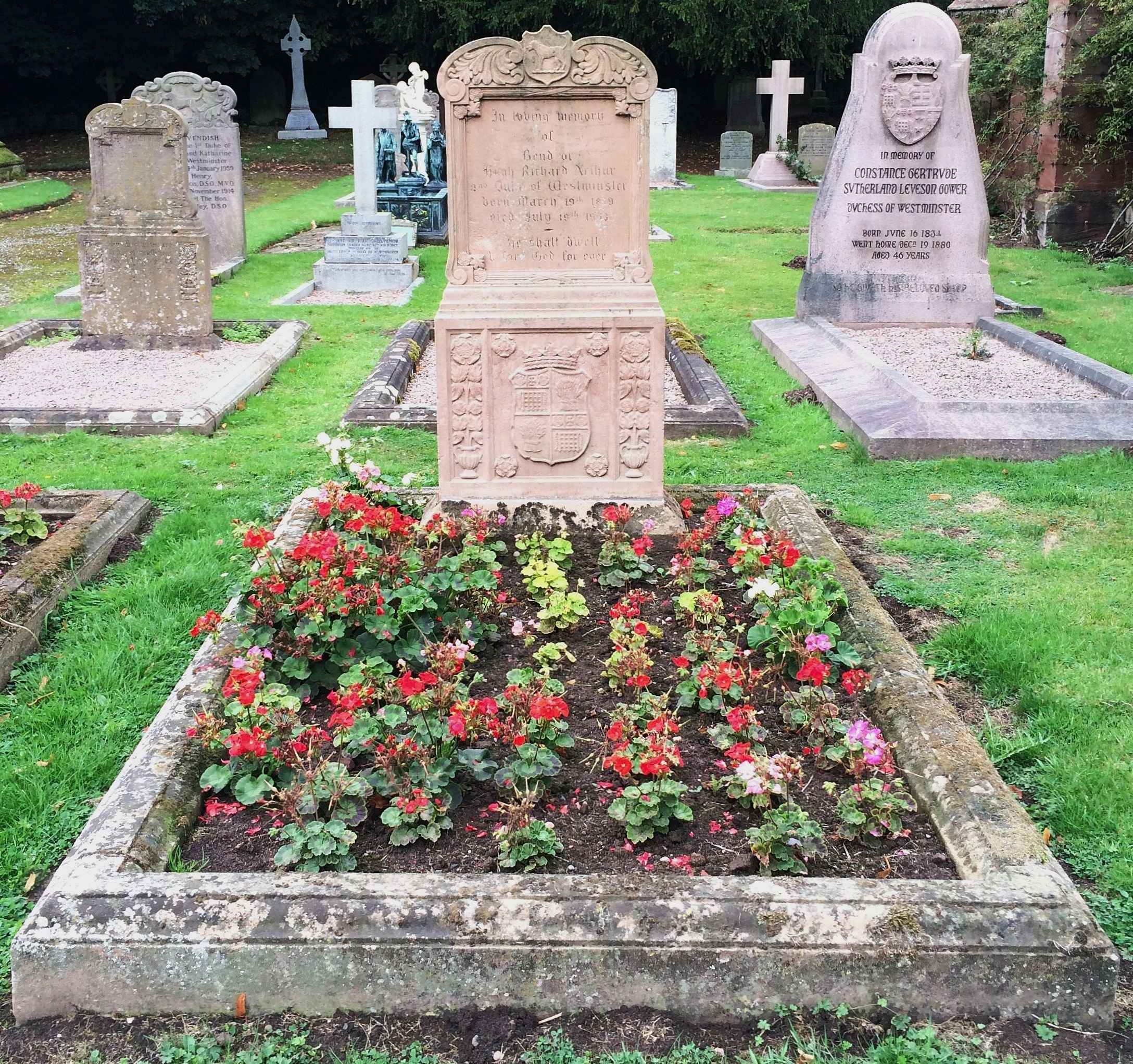
Grave of Hugh Grosvenor, 2nd Duke of Westminster

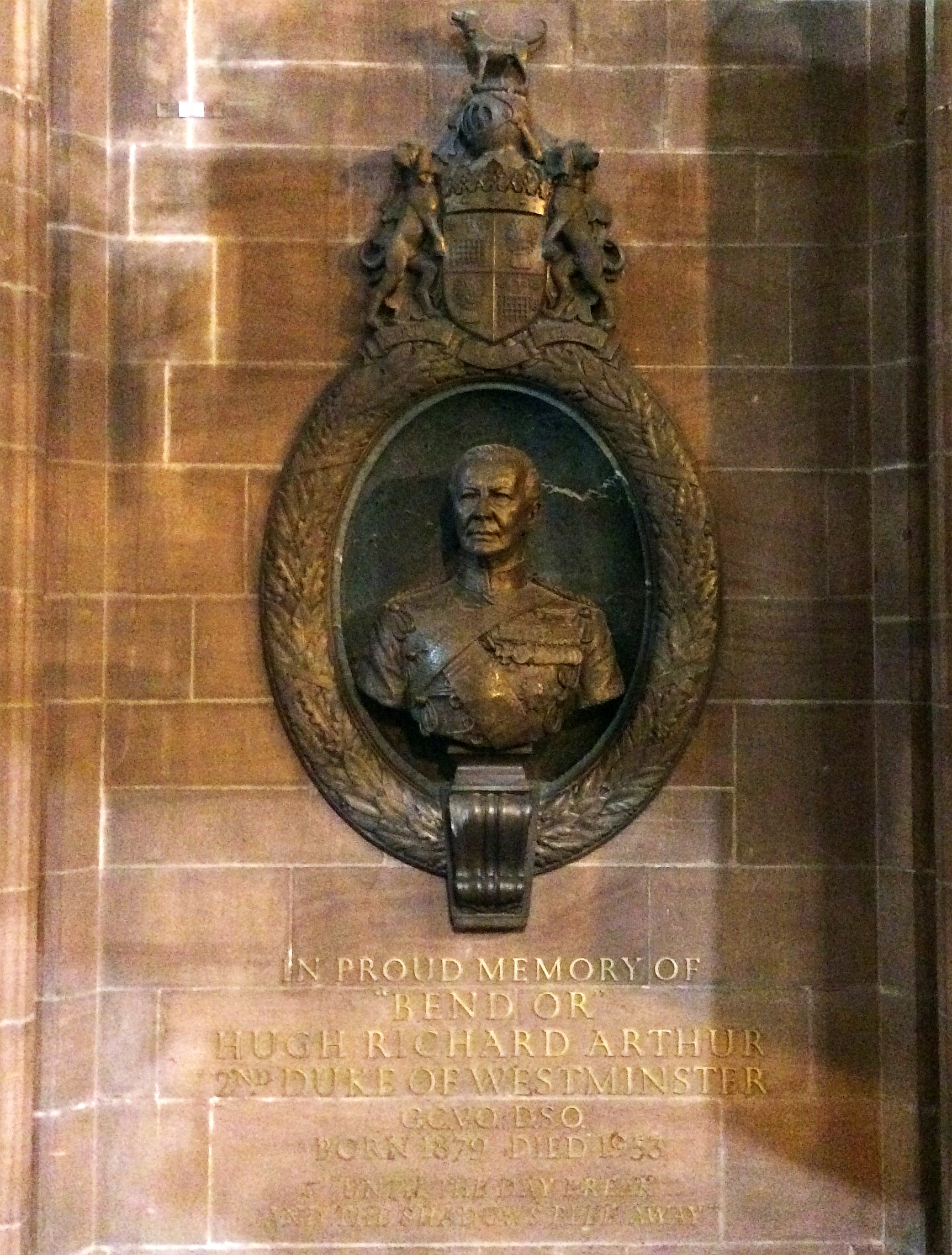
The 2nd Duke of Westminster's memorial in Eccleston

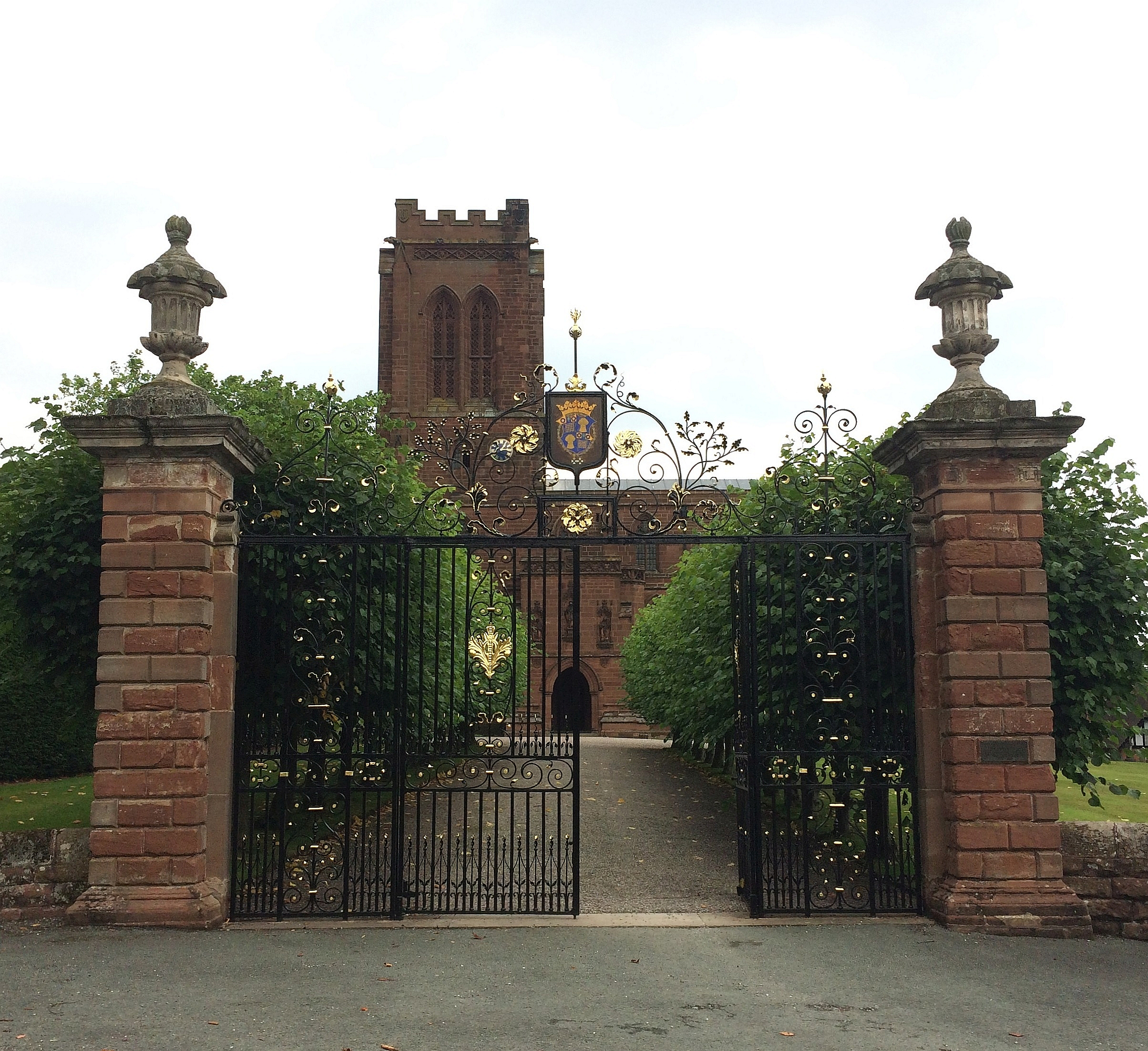
Gates of St Mary's Church, Eccleston, installed as a memorial to the 2nd Duke of Westminster

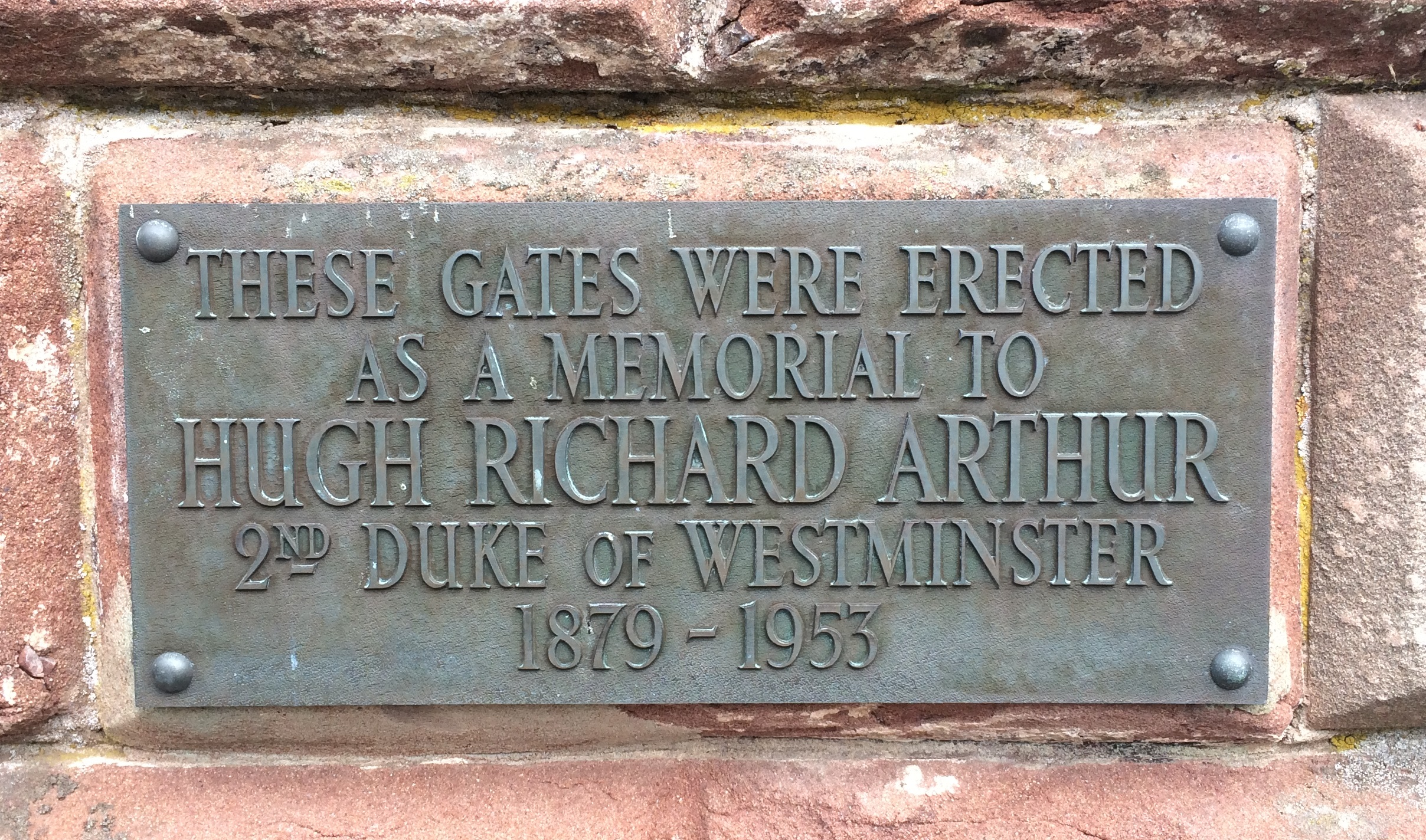
Plaque on the gates of St Mary's Church, Eccleston

== Notes ==
Honorary titles
Preceded by The Earl Egerton of Tatton	Lord Lieutenant of Cheshire; 1905–1920	Succeeded by Sir William Bromley-Davenport
Peerage of the United Kingdom
Preceded by Hugh Grosvenor	Duke of Westminster; 1899–1953	Succeeded by William Grosvenor
