= Tringham =

Tringham is a surname. Notable people with the surname include:

- David Tringham (1935–2022), British assistant film director
- David Tringham (Born 1983), British / Australian Entrepreneur and company director
- Holland Tringham (1861–1908), British artist and illustrator
- Ruth Tringham (born 1940), British anthropologist
