= Hugh Grosvenor =

Hugh Grosvenor may refer to:

- Hugh Grosvenor, 1st Duke of Westminster (1825–1899)
- Hugh Grosvenor, 2nd Duke of Westminster (1879–1953)
- Hugh Grosvenor, 2nd Baron Stalbridge, Baron Stalbridge
- Hugh William Grosvenor (1884–1914), son of Hugh Grosvenor, 1st Duke of Westminster
- Hugh Grosvenor, 7th Duke of Westminster (born 1991), son of Gerald Grosvenor, 6th Duke of Westminster
