= Gerald Grosvenor =

Gerald Grosvenor is the name of:

- Gerald Grosvenor, 4th Duke of Westminster (1907–1967)
- Gerald Grosvenor, 6th Duke of Westminster (1951–2016)
