= J. R. Ackerley =

English writer and editor (1896–1967)

- Born: 4 November 1896; London, England
- Died: 4 June 1967 (aged 70); London, England
- Education: Magdalene College, Cambridge
- Occupations: Writer and editor
- Relatives: Sally Grosvenor (sister)
- Website: jrackerley.com

Joe Randolph Ackerley (4 November 1896 – 4 June 1967) was a British writer and editor. Starting with the BBC the year after its founding in 1927, he was promoted to literary editor of The Listener, its weekly magazine, where he served for more than two decades. He published many emerging poets and writers who became influential in Great Britain. He was openly homosexual, a rarity in his time when homosexual activity was forbidden by law and socially ostracised.

Ackerley's extramarital half-sister was Sally Grosvenor, Duchess of Westminster.

== Family and education ==
Ackerley's memoir My Father and Myself begins: "I was born in 1896 and my parents were married in 1919." Registered at birth as Joe Ackerley, he later took the middle name Randolph after his uncle, Randolph Payne, first husband of his mother's sister Bunny. As an adult, he published under his first two initials and surname. His father, (Alfred) Roger Ackerley, was a successful fruit merchant known as the "Banana King" of London. Roger Ackerley was first married to a young Swiss woman of wealthy parentage named (Charlotte) Louise Burckhardt (1862–1892) who died probably of tuberculosis, before they had children. Louise was the subject of John Singer Sargent's painting, Lady with the Rose.

His mother was Janetta Aylward (known as Netta), an actress whom Roger met in Paris; the two returned to London together. They had an intermittent relationship, and three years later, in 1895, she gave birth to a son, Peter, then Joe a year later, and Nancy in 1899. According to Joe's maternal Aunt Bunny, Peter's birth, and likely all of them, were "accidents." She told him, "Your father happened to have run out of French letters that day," (when Peter was conceived). His father set up a household with his mother starting in 1903, after which the children saw him more regularly. His business, Elders & Fyffes Ltd, did very well, and the family had a "butler, a gardener, and, evidently, a very good table."

Ackerley was educated at Rossall School, a public and preparatory school in Fleetwood, Lancashire. During this time, he discovered he was attracted to other boys. His striking good looks earned him the nickname "Girlie," but he was not very sexually active as a schoolboy. He described himself as

"a chaste, puritanical, priggish, rather narcissistic little boy, more repelled than attracted to sex, which seemed to me a furtive, guilty, soiling thing, exciting, yes, but nothing whatever to do with those feelings which I had not yet experienced but about which I was already writing a lot of dreadful sentimental verse, called romance and love."

His father gave him a generous allowance and never insisted that he follow him into the business.

== First World War ==
After the First World War broke out in August 1914, Ackerley was commissioned as a second lieutenant in September 1914. He was assigned to the 8th Battalion of the East Surrey Regiment, part of the 18th Division, then stationed in East Anglia. In June 1915, he was sent to France. On 1 July 1916, he was wounded at the Battle of the Somme. He was shot in the arm and suffered shards of a whisky bottle becoming imbedded in his side from an explosion. After lying wounded in a shell-hole for six hours, he was rescued and sent home for sick-leave.

He soon volunteered to go back to the front. He was promoted to captain, when his elder brother Peter, also an officer in the East Surrey Regiment, arrived in France in December 1916. At the time, Ackerley was his superior officer. He later wrote that the cheerful Peter saluted his brother "gladly and conscientiously." In February 1917, Peter was wounded in action on a dangerous assignment. Though Peter got back to the British lines, Ackerley never saw him again, as he was killed on 7 August 1918, three months before the end of the war. Peter's death haunted Ackerley all his life; he suffered from survivor's guilt.

In May 1917, Ackerley led an attack in the Arras region where he was wounded, this time in the buttock and thigh. While he was waiting for help, the Germans arrived and took him prisoner. As an officer, he was assigned to an internment camp in neutral Switzerland, which was relatively comfortable. Here he began his play, The Prisoners of War, which expresses the cabin fever of captivity and his frustrated longings for another English prisoner. Ackerley was not repatriated to England until after the war ended. Temporary Captain Ackerley relinquished his commission on completion of service, 24 April 1919.

== Career ==
From the autumn of 1919, Ackerley attended Magdalene College, Cambridge, where he was in the same year as Patrick Blackett, Geoffrey Webb and Kingsley Martin. After graduating with a third-class degree in English in 1921, he moved to London, where he enjoyed the cosmopolitan capital and continued to write. In 1923 his play The Prisoners of War was included in a collection of young British writers, so he began to receive some recognition.

He met E. M. Forster and other literary bright lights, but was lonely, despite numerous sexual partners. With his play having trouble finding a producer and feeling generally adrift and distant from his family, Ackerley turned to Forster for guidance. Forster, whom he knew from A Passage to India, arranged a position as secretary to the Maharaja of Chhatarpur, Vishwanath Singh.

Ackerley spent about five months in India, which was still under British rule. He developed a strong distaste for the several Anglo-Indians (British people living in India) he met. Ackerley's comic memoir Hindoo Holiday explores some of his experiences. The Maharaja was homosexual, and His Majesty's obsessions and dalliances, along with Ackerley's observations about Anglo-Indians, account for much of the humour of the work.

In England, The Prisoners of War was finally produced in 1925, to some acclaim. Its run began at The Three Hundred Club on 5 July 1925, then transferred to the Playhouse Theatre on 31 August. Ackerley enjoyed his success, returning to London to carouse with its theatrical crowd. Through Cambridge friends, he met John Gielgud and other rising stars of the stage.

In 1928 Ackerley joined the staff of the British Broadcasting Corporation (BBC). He worked in the Talks Department, which arranged radio lectures by prominent scholars and public figures. He helped to create the new department, which had an extensive influence on British literary and cultural life.

In 1935 Ackerley was appointed Literary Editor of the BBC's magazine The Listener. He served in this position until 1959, discovering and promoting many younger writers, including W. H. Auden, Christopher Isherwood, Philip Larkin, and Stephen Spender.

Ackerley was one of Francis King's two mentors (the other being C. H. B. Kitchin).

== Later life and death ==
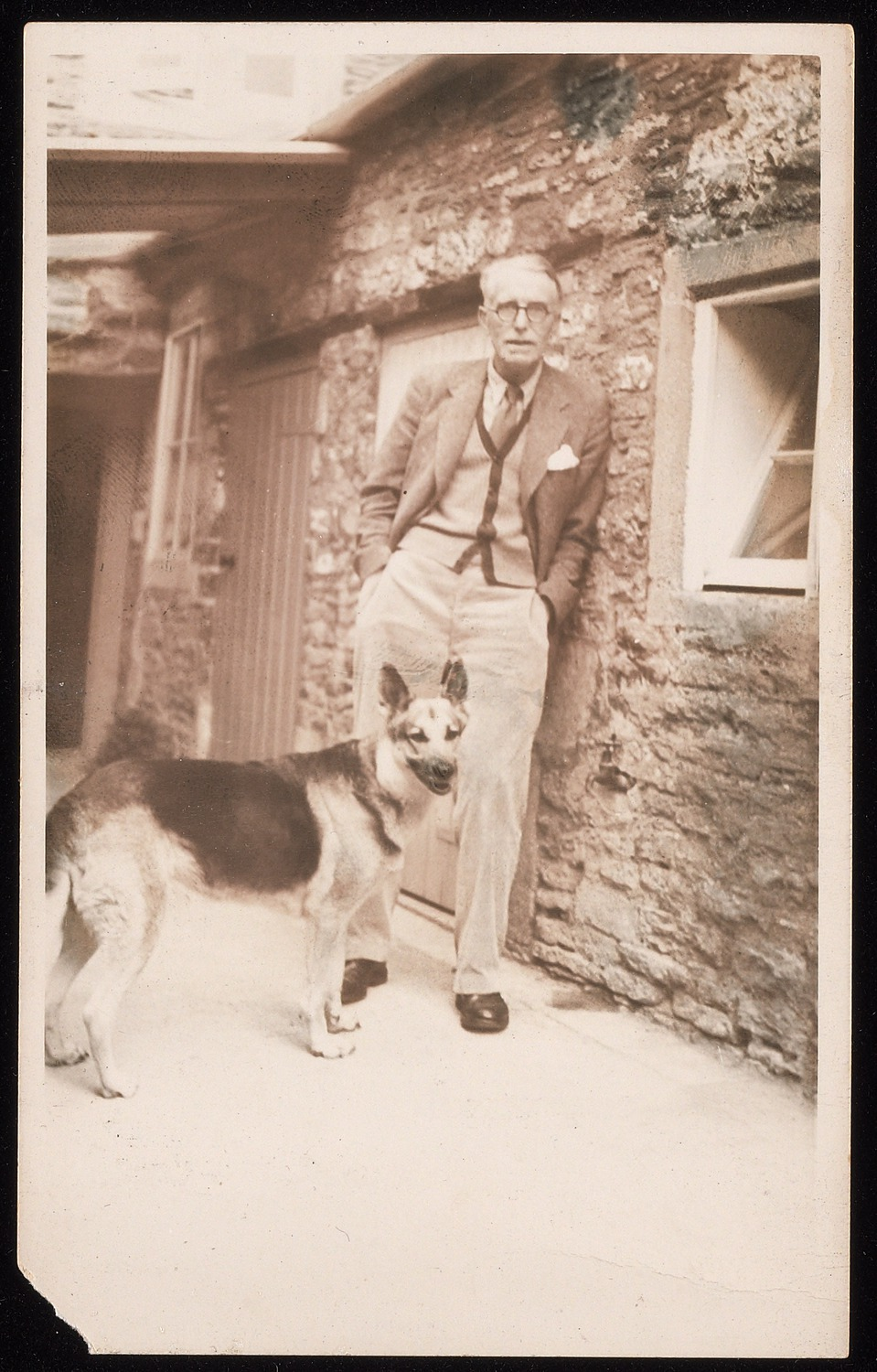
Ackerley and his dog Queenie; Donald Windham and Sandy Campbell papers/Beinecke 10541998

From 1943, Ackerley lived in a small flat at Putney overlooking the Thames. It was in Star and Garter Mansions, which were situated above the large riverside pub of the same name. Almost all his significant work was produced during this period. He had a stable job at the BBC and ended the unsatisfying promiscuity of his younger years. What remained was his search for what he called an "Ideal Friend".

Ackerley took financial responsibility for his sister Nancy, who was unstable, and his aging Aunt Bunny. In 1946 (the year his mother died), he acquired an Alsatian dog named Queenie. The dog became his primary companion for the next 15 years. During this time, he was most productive. He revised Hindoo Holiday (1952), completed My Dog Tulip (1956) and We Think the World of You (1960), and worked on drafts of My Father and Myself.

Ackerley left the BBC in 1959. He visited Japan in 1960 to see his friend Francis King; he was very taken with the beauty of the scenery and even more with Japanese men.

On 30 October 1961 Queenie died. Ackerley, who had lost a brother and both parents, described it as "the saddest day of my life." He said: "I would have immolated myself as a suttee when Queenie died. For no human would I ever have done such a thing, but by my love for Queenie I would have been irresistibly compelled." In 1962, We Think the World of You won the W. H. Smith Literary Award, which came with a substantial cash prize, but this did little to stir him from his grief. (He thought Richard Hughes should have won, and also thought little of the award's previous recipients.)

In the years after Queenie's death Ackerley worked on his memoir about his father and drank too much. His sister Nancy found him dead in his bed on the morning of 4 June 1967. Ackerley's biographer Peter Parker gives the cause of death as coronary thrombosis.

Toward the end of his life Ackerley sold 1,075 letters from Forster, dating from 1922 onwards, for which he received £6,000. He said that it was "a sum of money which will enable Nancy and me to drink ourselves carelessly into our graves". Ackerley did not live long enough to enjoy the money, but, together with the royalties from his existing works and posthumous works, it allowed Nancy to live in relative comfort until her death in 1979.

== Sexuality ==
Ackerley was openly homosexual after his parents' deaths, having realised his homosexuality while he was interned in Switzerland during the First World War. Ackerley plumbed his sexuality in his writings. He belonged to a circle of notable literary homosexuals. They flouted convention, specifically the homophobia that kept gay men in the closet or exposed openly gay men to legal prosecution.

While he never found the "Ideal Friend" he wrote of so often, he had many long-term relationships. Ackerley was a "twank", a term used by sailors and guardsmen to describe a man who paid for their sexual services. He described the ritual of picking up and entertaining a young guardsman, sailor or labourer. Forster warned him, "Joe, you must give up looking for gold in coal mines."

His memoir serves as a guide to the sexuality of a gay man of Ackerley's generation. W. H. Auden, in his review of My Father and Myself, speculates that Ackerley enjoyed the "brotherly" sexual act of mutual masturbation rather than penetration. Ackerley described himself as "quite impenetrable".

He encouraged Harry Daley to publish This Small Cloud, his account of his experiences as a gay police constable on the Bloomsbury beat (Daley was painted in his uniform by Duncan Grant).

== Father's second family ==
In October 1929, Ackerley's father, Roger Ackerley died of tertiary syphilis. Shortly afterward Ackerley found a sealed note from his father addressed to him, which concluded:

"I am not going to make any excuses, old man. I have done my duty towards everybody as far as my nature would allow and I hope people generally will be kind to my memory. All my men pals know of my second family and of their mother, so you won't find it difficult to get on their track."

Ackerley thus discovered that his father had had a second family for more than 20 years. Roger used to visit his daughters three or four times a year when he was supposedly travelling on business, and sometimes when out to walk his first family's dog. His mistress, Muriel Perry, served as a nurse during the First World War and was busy with her career; she seldom saw their three daughters: Sally and Elizabeth, twins born in 1909, and Diana, born in 1912; all were cared for by a Miss Coutts. The birth of the youngest was never registered but they were all given their mother's surname. Ackerley described the lives of his half-sisters in his 1968 memoir: "They had no parental care, no family life, no friends." For years the girls thought that their father was "Uncle Bodger", who occasionally brought them gifts and money. Ackerley looked after his father's second family without telling his mother, who died in 1946.

For years Ackerley was obsessed with his relationship with his father, both because of the tension of his covert homosexuality and what he described as his father's domineering personality. In his memoir, My Father and Myself (1969), which one reviewer termed the "mystery" of the son on the track of his father, Ackerley speculated that his father had had some homosexual experiences as a young Guardsman. In trying to understand his father's life, he grappled with his own.

In 1975 Diana Perry, then Diana Petre, published a memoir, The Secret Orchard of Roger Ackerley. "Secret orchard" was Roger's term for his second family, used in one of his final notes to his son.

== Works ==
- The Prisoners of War (first performed 5 July 1925), a play about Captain Conrad's comfortable captivity in Switzerland during the First World War. Conrad suffers most from his longing for the attractive young Lieutenant Grayle. Ackerley claimed to prefer the title The Interned to The Prisoners of War.
- Escapers All (1932), 15 first-person accounts by men who had escaped from prisoner-of-war camps during the First World War, edited and introduced by Ackerley (published by The Bodley Head).
- Hindoo Holiday (1932, revised and expanded 1952), a memoir of Ackerley's brief engagement as secretary to an Indian Maharaja in the city of Chhatarpur, which he calls Chhokrapur (meaning "City of Boys") in the book.
- My Dog Tulip (1956), an account of living with his dog Queenie. Her companionship enabled him to give up seeking casual sex. The dog's name was changed to Tulip in the title when the editors of Commentary, who had purchased an excerpt, became concerned that using the name Queenie might encourage jokes about Ackerley's sexuality. The book was adapted as an animated feature released in 2009 and starring Christopher Plummer, Lynn Redgrave and Isabella Rossellini.
- We Think the World of You (1960), Ackerley's only novel; it explores a middle-class intellectual man (based closely on himself) and his working-class London family. It includes a fictionalised account of Ackerley's experience with his dog Queenie (called "Evie" in the book). It explores the frustrations of the relationship between the homosexual narrator and Evie's former owner, who was (mostly) heterosexual. The novel was adapted as a film of the same title, which starred Alan Bates and Gary Oldman, and was released in 1988.

Works published posthumously:

- My Father and Myself (1968), a memoir of Ackerley's life and relationship with his father. Together with a 1975 memoir by his half-sister Diana Petre, it was the basis of the 1979 TV film Secret Orchards, about their father's two sets of children.
- E. M. Forster: A Portrait (1970), short biography of the writer.
- Micheldever and Other Poems (1972), poetry volume.
- The Ackerley Letters (1975), edited by Neville Braybrooke.
- My Sister and Myself (1982), selections from Ackerley's diary, edited by Francis King. Most material refers to Ackerley's relationship with his sister Nancy West (née Ackerley).

In the United States Ackerley's books have been reissued and are published solely by New York Review of Books Classics.

== Legacy ==
In 1980 the BBC series Omnibus profiled Ackerley in a dramatised biography starring Benjamin Whitrow. Entitled We Think The World of You, it was not an adaptation of the novel as such, although included elements of it. Written by Tristram Powell and Paul Bailey, and directed by Powell, it won a BAFTA award in 1981.

Ackerley's sister Nancy endowed the annual J. R. Ackerley Prize for Autobiography, which was awarded beginning in 1982.

== Quotations ==
- "If you look like a wild beast, you are expected to behave like one." (My Dog Tulip)
- "To speak the truth, I think that people ought to be upset, and if I had a paper I would upset them all the time; I think that life is so important and, in its workings, so upsetting that nobody should be spared." (Letter to Stephen Spender, December 1955.)
- "If there is good to be said of me, others must report that." (Notebook for My Father and Myself)
- "'The fair sex? And which sex is that?'" (Captain Conrad to Mme. Louis in The Prisoners of War)

== See also ==
- My Dog Tulip
- Secret Orchards
- We Think the World of You

== Sources ==
- Petre, Diana. The Secret Orchard of Roger Ackerley. London, Hamish Hamilton, 1975
- Miller, Neil (1995). Out of the Past: Gay and Lesbian History from 1869 to the Present. New York, Vintage Books. ISBN 0-09-957691-0.
- Murray, Stephen O. "Ackerley, Joseph Randolph", Encyclopedia of Homosexuality. Dynes, Wayne R. (ed.), Garland Publishing, 1990. p. 9
- Parker, Peter, Ackerley: The Life of J. R. Ackerley. New York: Farrar, Straus and Giroux. 1989.
- Stern, Keith (2009), "Ackerley, J.R.", Queers in History, BenBella Books, Inc.; Dallas, Texas, ISBN 978-1-933771-87-8
