= Lord Hugh Grosvenor =

British Army officer

Captain Lord Hugh Grosvenor, 1st Life Guards, c. 1914

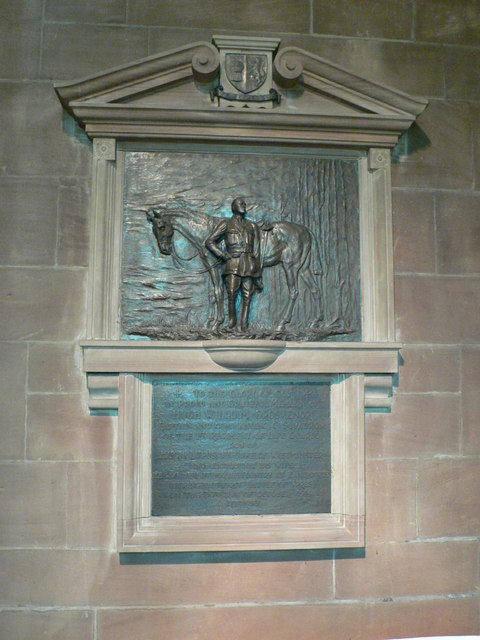
Memorial to Captain Lord Hugh William Grosvenor at St Mary's Church, Eccleston

Captain Lord Hugh William Grosvenor (6 April 1884 – 30 October 1914) was a British Army officer, aristocrat, and polo player. The son of the first Duke of Westminster, he died in the First World War. He was the father of the fourth and fifth dukes.

== Early life ==
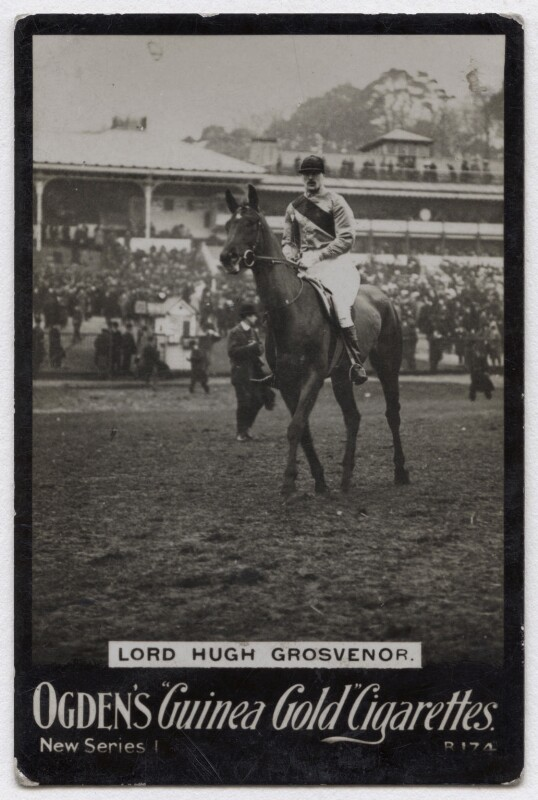
Ogden's cigarette card from the 1900s featuring Lord Hugh Grosvenor playing polo

Lord Hugh was born at Grosvenor House, Mayfair, into a distinguished military family, one of 12 surviving children born to Hugh Grosvenor, 1st Duke of Westminster. His father, a landowner and politician, was one of the wealthiest men in Britain and came from a distinguished family. Every generation of the Grosvenor family had served in the military dating to the time of William the Conqueror and Hugh d'Avranches, Earl of Chester, whose nickname, le gros veneur, gave the family its surname.

Lord Hugh was born when his father was close to 60. His mother was the duke's (much younger) second wife, the Hon. Katherine Cavendish, daughter of William Cavendish, 2nd Baron Chesham. His younger brother Lord Edward Grosvenor was a famed aviator and his elder half-sisters included Elizabeth, Marchioness of Ormonde and Margaret Cambridge, Marchioness of Cambridge, who married Adolphus Cambridge, 1st Marquess of Cambridge (brother of Queen Mary of Teck). Following his father's death in 1899, Lord Hugh inherited a £50,000 trust, whilst the bulk of the Grosvenor Estates were inherited by his half-nephew Hugh Grosvenor, 2nd Duke of Westminster.

He was educated at Eton and Balliol College, Oxford.

== WWI service and death ==
Grosvenor was the commander of C Squadron, 1st Life Guards, and was killed in action, aged thirty, during World War I.

Lord Hugh's unit deployed at Zandvoorde and participated in the First Battle of Ypres. In an exposed position for six days they held the shallow trench in front of Zandvoorde on the forward slope. Grosvenor sent a message back to his headquarters -

'There appears to be a considerable force of the enemy to my front and to my right front. They approach to within about seven hundred yards at night. Our shells have not been near them on this flank'

The British trenches were attacked and the cavalry fighting as infantry was overwhelmed in hand-to-hand fighting. By 08.30 on the morning of 30 October 1914 news reached HQ that the 7th Cavalry Brigade had been forced off the Zandvoorde Ridge. With no survivors there was initially some confusion as to Lord Hugh's fate.

The 1st Life Guard's war diary noted the action at Zandvoorde -

Zandvoorde-Oct 30 6am Heavy bombardment of position opened. At 7.30am position was attacked by large force of infantry. This attack proved successful owing to greatly superior numbers. Regiment retired in good order about 10.00am except C Squadron on the left flank from which only about ten men got back. Remainder of Squadron missing. Also one machine gun put out of action.

He was initially reported as being made a prisoner of war. The Times reported a comrade stating that Lord Hugh was wounded and his horse killed following a 'gallant charge to draw the fire of the German field batteries'. After the withdrawal of the Life Guards he was believed captured after failing to mount a second horse. However, he was later believed to have been killed in action on 30 October 1914 rather than captured as initially thought.

Having no known grave, he is commemorated on the Menin Gate Memorial, Ypres.

== Marriage and children ==
Grosvenor married Lady Mabel Crichton, daughter of John Crichton, 4th Earl Erne and his wife Lady Florence Cole, daughter of William Cole, 3rd Earl of Enniskillen, on 21 April 1906. They had two sons who each inherited the dukedom:

- Gerald Hugh Grosvenor, 4th Duke of Westminster (13 February 1907 – 25 February 1967), succeeded his cousin William as Duke in 1963
- Robert George Grosvenor, 5th Duke of Westminster (24 April 1910 – 19 February 1979), succeeded his brother in 1967

== Polo ==
He was one of a number of British polo players who died in World War I.
