= Vishwanath Singh (maharaja) =

Maharaja of Chhatarpur from 1867 to 1932

- His Highness Raja Sir Shri Vishwanath Singh Bahadur KCSI, Maharaja of Chhatarpur
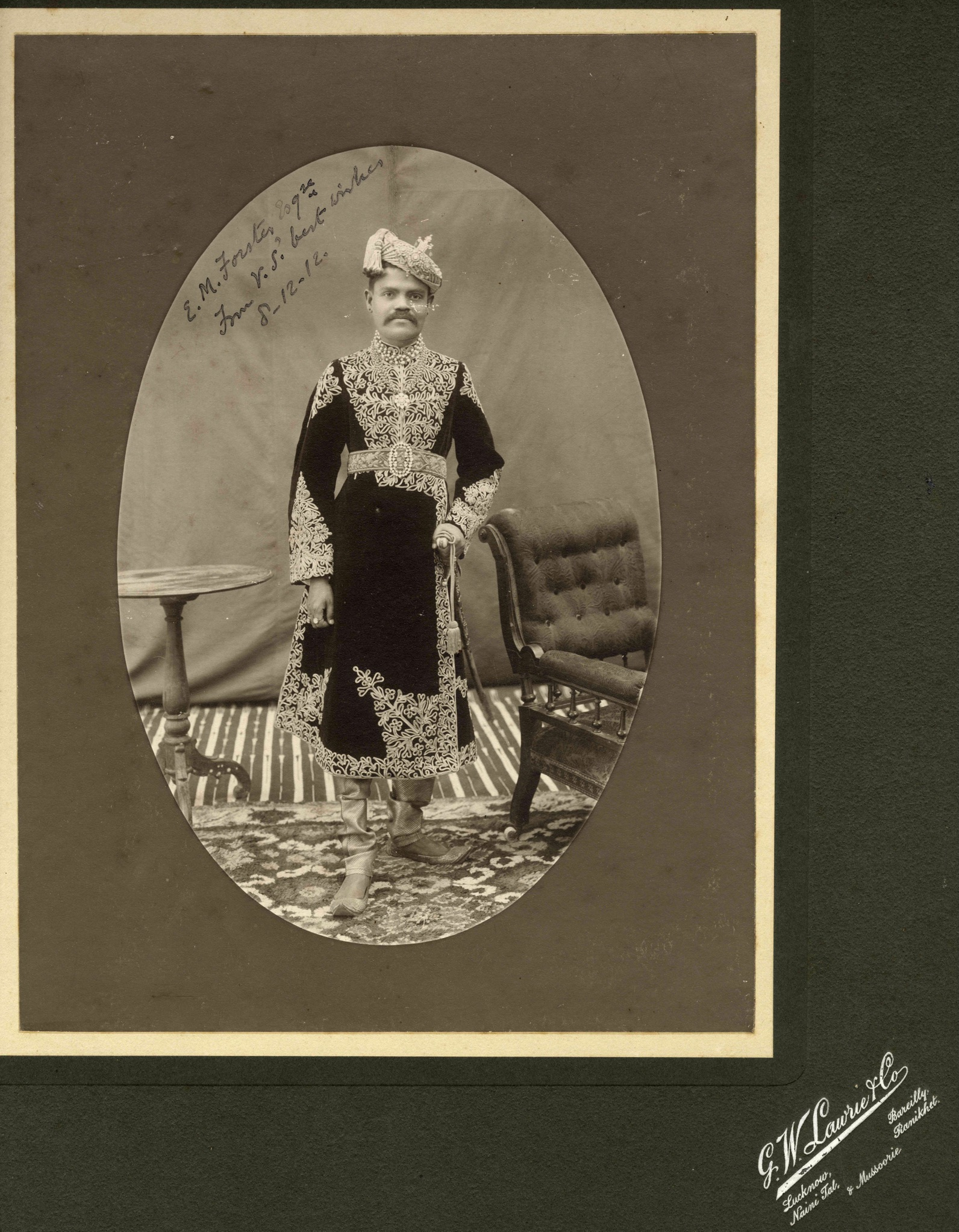

Maharaja of Chhatarpur
- Reign: 4 November 1867 – 4 April 1932
- Predecessor: Jagat Raj
- Born: Vishwanath Singh; 29 August 1866; Chhatarpur State, Bundelkhand Agency, Central India Agency, British Raj (now Chhatarpur District, Madhya Pradesh, India)
- Died: 4 April 1932 (aged 65); Chhatarpur State, Bundelkhand Agency, Central India Agency, British Raj
- Father: Jagat Raj

Maharaja Vishwanath Singh Bahadur KCSI (29 August 1866 – 4 April 1932) was Maharaja of the salute state of Chhatarpur from 1867 to 1932.

== Life ==
The son of Raja Jagat Raj of Chhatarpur, Vishwanath Singh succeeded his father as Raja on 4 November 1867 when just over a year old. He ruled under British supervision until his 21st birthday, when he was invested with full ruling powers. The then Political Agent for the Central India Agency, Lepel Griffin, recorded his strong reservations regarding Singh's accession, feeling he was "singularly weak...I cannot believe that he will ever prove an independent or energetic ruler."

As was well known to British authorities, Singh was openly homosexual, "exceedingly boyish for his age" in the parlance of the era. Despite their generally unfavourable attitudes towards him, however, Chhatarpur was one of the princely states that had remained loyal to the imperial government during the Indian Rebellion of 1857, and was the headquarters of the Bundelkhand Agency, also hosting a garrison at Nowgong. Consequently, the British preferred to maintain the status quo rather than openly intervene in the management of the state. As part of this policy, Singh was granted the personal title of Maharaja on 25 May 1895, which was made hereditary in June 1919. In 1921, he was further granted hereditary powers of jurisdiction over criminal offences committed within the state, and was knighted as a Knight Commander of the Order of the Star of India (KCSI) in the 1928 New Year Honours list,

Author E. M. Forster, himself homosexual, visited Chhatarpur in 1912–13 and met the Maharaja, recording his passions to be "philosophy, friendship and beautiful boys." On Forster's recommendation, Vishwanath Singh appointed the author J. R. Ackerley as his private secretary in 1923. Ackerley, who only served in the post for five months, from December 1923 to May 1924, later published a thinly disguised memoir about his experiences in the service of the "Maharajah of Chhokrapur" entitled Hindoo Holiday; the book was not published until after Singh's death in 1932 to avoid libel suits. A primary reason for this was, though Singh was childless and reportedly impotent due to venereal disease, he had remarried after the death of his first wife in 1921 and supposedly fathered a son and heir shortly afterwards by his second wife. According to British administrators, however, he had in reality had two of his barbers have sexual relations with the new Maharani, which was kept secret, and the imperial government desired to avoid accusations of authorising a socially unacceptable and illegal succession.

The Maharaja died on 4 April 1932, aged 65, after a reign of 64 years and 5 months.
