= Chhatarpur State =

Princely state of India (1785–1950)

Coordinates: 24.915709°N 79.582214°E

- 1785–1950
- Flag

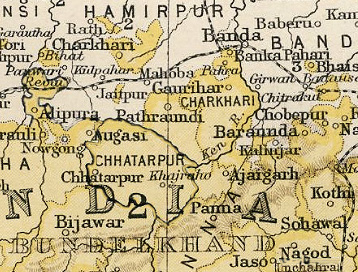
- Chhatarpur State in the Imperial Gazetteer of India
- Capital: Chhatarpur
- History
  - Established: 1785
  - Accession to the Union of India: 1950

Area
- 1901: 2,927 km^{2} (1,130 sq mi)

Population
  - 1901: 10,029
Succeeded by
India

Chhatarpur was one of the princely states of India during the period of the British Raj. The state was founded in 1785 and its capital was located in Chhatarpur, Madhya Pradesh.

Chhatarpur's last ruler signed the accession to the Indian Union on 1 January 1950.

== History ==
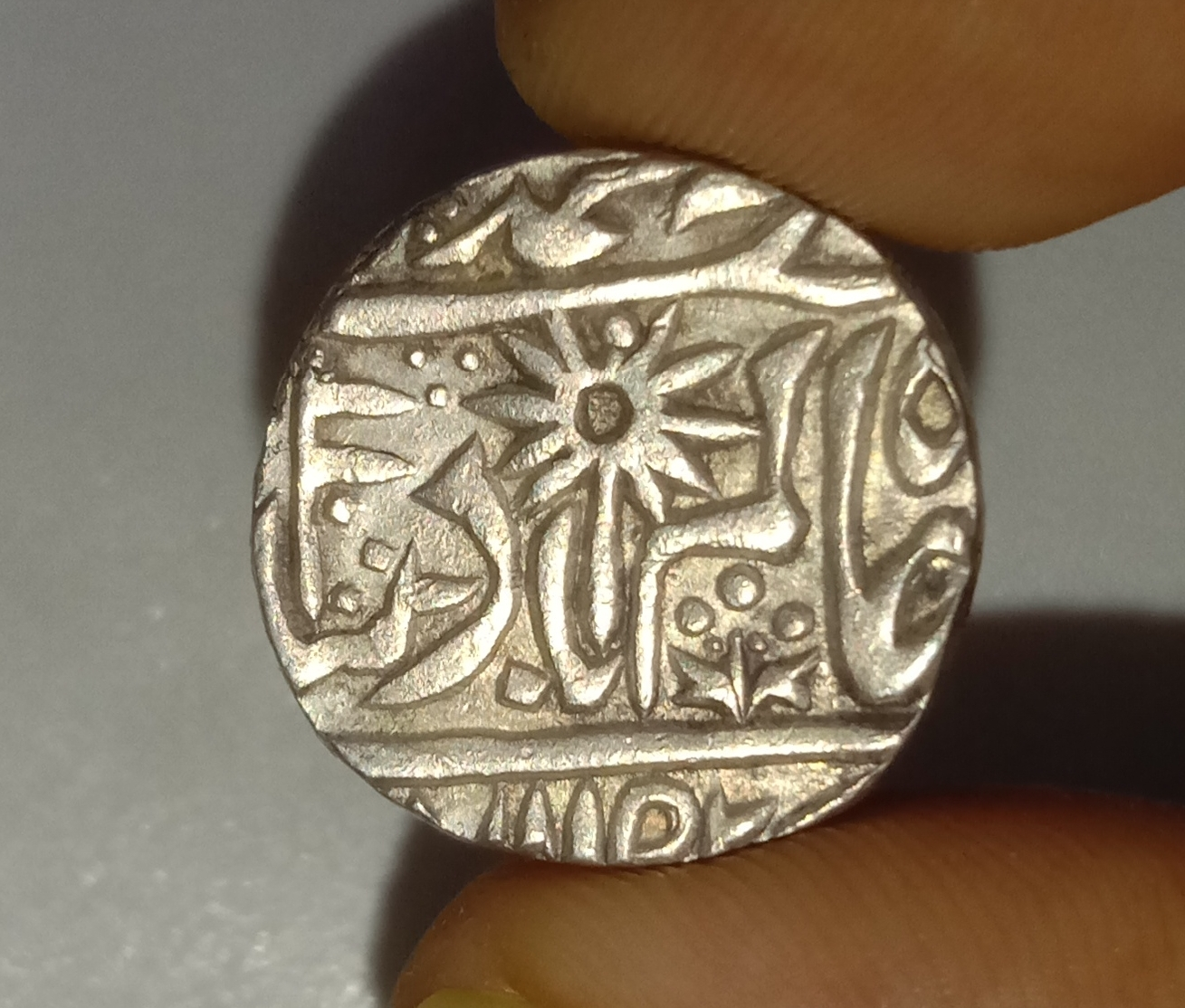
Silver Rupee of the princely state of Chhatarpur, struck in the name of Mughal emperor Shah Alam II.

Chhatarpur was founded in 1785. It is named after the Chhatrasal, the founder of Bundelkhand, and contains his cenotaph. The state was ruled by his descendants until 1785. The state was guaranteed to Kunwar Sone Singh Ponwar in 1806 by the British Raj.

In 1854, Chhatarpur would have lapsed to the British government for want of direct heirs under the doctrine of lapse, but was conferred on Jagat Raj as a special act of grace. The Rajas ruled a princely state with an area of 1,118 square miles (2,900 km^{2}), and population of 156,139 in 1901, which was part of the Bundelkhand agency of Central India.

In 1901 the town of Chhatarpur had a population of 10,029, a high school and manufactured paper and coarse cutlery. The state also contained the British cantonment of Nowgaon. After the independence of India in 1947, the Rajas of Chhatarpur acceded to India, and Chhatarpur, together with the rest of Bundelkhand Agency, became part of the Indian state of Vindhya Pradesh. Vindhya Pradesh was merged into the state of Madhya Pradesh in 1956.

== Rulers ==
The rulers bore the title of Raja and later Maharaja.

=== Rajas ===
The Pawar (Parmar) Rajput dynasty ruled Chhatarpur State.

- 1785 – 1816 Kunwar Sone Shah
- 1816 – 1854 Partap Singh
- 1854 – 4 November 1867 Jaghat Singh (b. 1846 – d. 1867)
- 14 November 1867 – 1895 Vishwanath Singh (b. 1866 – d. 1932)

=== Maharajas ===
- 1895 - 5 April 1932 Vishwanath Singh (s.a.)
- 5 Apr 1932 – 15 Aug 1947 Bhawani Singh (b. 1921 - d. 2006)

=== Titular Maharajas ===
- 1947 – 2006 Bhawani Singh (S.A)
- 2006 – Present Vikram Singh Bahadur

== See also ==
- Bundelkhand Agency
- Vindhya Pradesh
