= Sally Grosvenor, Duchess of Westminster =

Duchess of Westminster (1909–1990)

Her Grace The Duchess of Westminster
- Born: Sally Perry; 1909
- Died: 30 May 1990 (aged 80–81); Frenchay Hospital, Bristol, England
- Spouse: Gerald Grosvenor, 4th Duke of Westminster (m. 1945; died 1967)
- Parent(s): Roger Ackerley; Muriel Perry
- Relatives: J. R. Ackerley (brother)

Sally Grosvenor, Duchess of Westminster (née Perry; 1909 – 30 May 1990) was the wife of Gerald Grosvenor, 4th Duke of Westminster.

== Early life ==
The Duchess was one of three extramarital daughters of Muriel Perry. She, her twin sister Elizabeth and three years younger sister Diana were raised by a Miss Coutts and seldom visited by their mother, who was busy serving as a nurse in the First World War and who appeared to have no interest in their upbringing; she would later serve as nurse in the Second World War and be awarded eight medals and an OBE. The girls' only visitor was a man they knew as "Uncle Bodger", who would come several times a year with presents. The man was Roger Ackerley, who, on his death, left his son, J. R. Ackerley, a letter in which he confessed to being the girls' father and asked him to care for them. Diana's birth was never registered and they were all given their mother's surname. Ackerley described the lives of his half-sisters in his 1968 memoir: "They had no parental care, no family life, no friends."

Perry and her twin sister ran away from the Coutts home at the age of 18.

== Duchess of Westminster ==
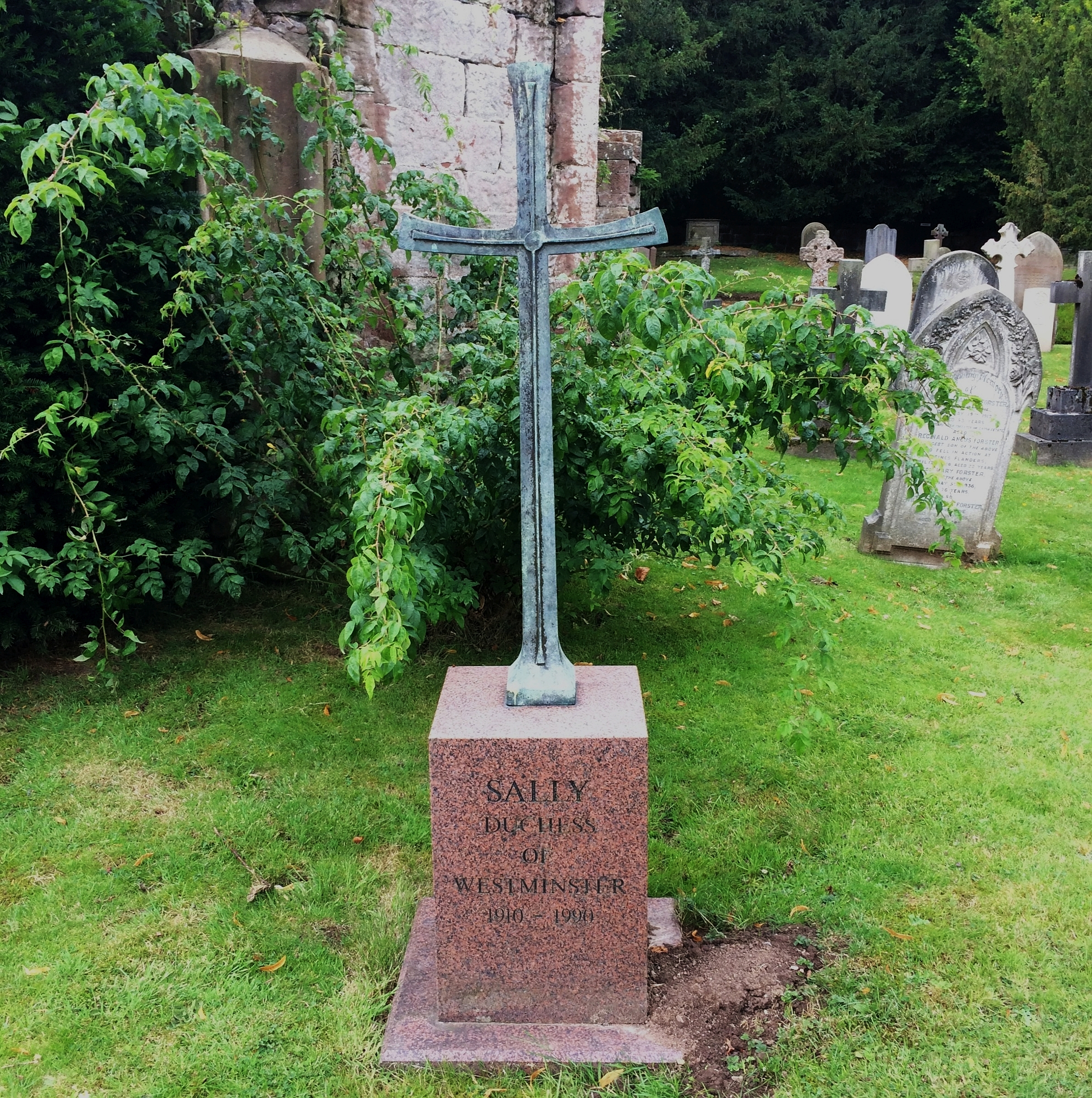
Grave of Sally, wife of the 4th Duke of Westminster

On 11 April 1945, she married Gerald Grosvenor, then third in line of succession to Hugh Grosvenor, 2nd Duke of Westminster. On his succession to the dukedom in 1963, she became Duchess of Westminster and spouse of the wealthiest man in Britain. The marriage was childless, however, and on her husband's death in 1967, the title devolved upon her brother-in-law Robert. The widowed duchess started travelling around the globe, visiting South America several times.

The Duchess, who had moved back to Gloucestershire on her husband's death, died on 30 May 1990 at Frenchay Hospital, Bristol, following a stroke. In her will, she left £100,000 for improvements to the Chester historic community garden, officially reopened by her nephew Gerald, 6th Duke, in 2011, and £505,000 to charities. Two years later, the 6th Duke opened an Andes-themed garden in Chester Zoo in honour of his aunt Sally, who was a zoo council member and who had donated seeds obtained during her 1968 visit to the Andes.

Sally Grosvenor, Duchess of Westminster, is buried in the churchyard of St Mary's, Eccleston, near Eaton Hall, Cheshire.

== See also ==
- Secret Orchards
