= Lord Edward Grosvenor =

British aviator (1892–1929)

- Born: Lord Edward Arthur Grosvenor; 27 October 1892; Eaton Hall, Cheshire
- Died: 26 August 1929 (aged 36); Yaverland, Isle of Wight
- Spouse: Lady Dorothy Margaret Browne
- Relatives: Hugh Lupus Grosvenor (father); Lord Hugh Grosvenor (brother)
- Military career
- Allegiance: United Kingdom
- Branch: British Army; Royal Air Force
- Rank: Squadron Leader
- Nickname: Ned
- Units: Cheshire Yeomanry; Royal Horse Guards
- Commands: 601 (County of London) Squadron
- Conflicts: First World War
- Awards: Military Cross; Order of Saints Maurice and Lazarus (Italy)

Lord Edward Arthur Grosvenor, MC (27 October 1892 – 26 August 1929) was a British aviator and Royal Air Force officer.

== Early life ==
Grosvenor, also known as Ned, was born in 1892 at Eaton Hall, Cheshire, to Hugh Grosvenor, 1st Duke of Westminster, and his second wife, Hon. Katherine Caroline Cavendish, daughter of William Cavendish, 2nd Baron Chesham. Grosvenor was educated at Eton College before embarking on a career in the military. Following his father's death in 1899, Lord Edward inherited a £50,000 trust, whilst the bulk of the Grosvenor Estates were inherited by his half-nephew Hugh Grosvenor, 2nd Duke of Westminster.

== Military service ==
After completing his education, Grosvenor joined the French Foreign Legion. In 1912, he left the legion and went on to be commissioned in the Royal Horse Guards. Joining the Royal Horse Guards from the Cheshire Yeomanry (with whom he served between 1910 and 1912), he began his service as a second lieutenant on probation.

After the outbreak of the First World War, Grosvenor transferred to the Royal Flying Corps and served in France and Italy. His wartime service saw him awarded the Military Cross as well as Italy's Order of Saints Maurice and Lazarus. The report of the award of the Italian honour by the King of Italy notes Lord Grosvenor as being a Flight Commander in the Royal Naval Air Service.

In May 1925, Grosvenor was attached to the RAF Experimental Station at Martlesham Heath in Suffolk.

In later life Grosvenor continued his military service as a member of the Royal Air Force Volunteer Reserve with No. 601 (County of London) Squadron as a squadron leader. It is believed that the squadron was formed at White's, a London gentlemen's club. As founder, the squadron historian notes that Grosvenor,

... chose his officers from among gentlemen of sufficient presence not to be overawed by him, and sufficient means not to be excluded from his favourite pastimes – eating, drinking and White's.

== Personal life ==
Grosvenor married Lady Dorothy Margaret Browne (daughter of Valentine Browne, 5th Earl of Kenmare) on 5 August 1914 at Lyndhurst, close to Calshot Naval Air Station where he was attached at the time. The couple had two daughters.

Grosvenor participated in the 1924 Gordon Bennett Balloon Race as pilot along with a Squadron Leader Baldwin of the British balloon Banshee III.

In the same year, Grosvenor took charge of the British team which took part in the Schneider Trophy in the United States of America.

In 1925 Grosvenor was injured in a road traffic accident while travelling with his wife and Lady Juliet Trevor on the Old Folkestone Road. After colliding with another car his 'head went through the windscreen and his left knee through the instrument board'. Lord Grosvenor needed four stitches to a deep cut following the accident.

Grosvenor disliked motorcars and did not drive. He employed a former wartime colleague on a salary of £2 a day to drive him. The driver was to be available 24 hours a day and drove Grosvenor in a Morris 'upright' taxi.

His work in aviation also took in membership of the Standing Committee for the Civil aviation Section at the London Chamber of Commerce.

Aside from his aeronautical interests, Grosvenor served as chairman of the West End (London) branch of the Economic Insurance Company Ltd.

Grosvenor died on 26 August 1929 at Yaverland Manor on the Isle of Wight. His funeral took place at Eccleston Church near Chester on 30 August 1929.

=== Grosvenor Cup ===
Grosvenor continued his relationship with aviation when he established a challenge cup to the Royal Aero Club in 1923.

In a bid to encourage low powered flight the rules stipulated that engines could not be more than 150 horse power. The aircraft had to be built in Britain and was only open to British pilots. The route was to run from Lympne Aerodrome and over Croydon, Bristol and Birmingham before returning to Lympne. In addition to the cup, Lord Grosvenor added a £100 first prize and £50 for second.

The first running of the Grosvenor Cup was won by Flight Lieutenant W. H. Longton flying a Sopwith Gnu and F. P. Raynham coming second in an Avro 504K. Sadly, Major Ernest Leslie Foot was killed when his aeroplane crashed at Chertsey.

Of the race he instituted, Grosvenor said -

My object in offering this cup is to give a chance to the low-power machine, one comparable to the average motor-car, with a horse-power of say, thirty of forty. I think this will prove the most suitable type for general use, as the really low-powered light aeroplane will not be large enough for general touring about the country.

— Lord Edward Grosvenor
