= Hindoo Holiday =

1931 memoir by J. R. Ackerley

- First edition
- Author: J. R. Ackerley
- Illustrator: J. R. Ackerley
- Cover artist: Unknown
- Language: English
- Genre: memoir
- Publisher: Chatto and Windus
- Publication date: 1932
- Publication place: United Kingdom
- Media type: Print (Hardback)
- Pages: 341
- Preceded by: Escapers All (as editor)
- Followed by: My Dog Tulip

Hindoo Holiday is a comic memoir by the English author J. R. Ackerley. Published by Chatto and Windus in 1932, it is written in the form of (and based on) a journal which Ackerley kept during his five-month engagement as secretary to Vishwanath Singh, Maharajah of Chhatarpur between December 1923 and May 1924. Described on publication as a "gay satire on autocracy", the text contains four line drawings by Ackerley himself.

== Content ==
The book has date entries rather than chapters, and is split into two parts. It is explicitly not a travel journal: Ackerley provides no account of his journey to or from India, and he has comparatively little to say about the environment beyond a few descriptions of his immediate locale. As if to further emphasise this, Part One ends with Ackerley preparing for a trip to Varanasi (identified as Benares in the book), and Part Two begins with his return to Chhatarpur. (Ackerley renames it 'Chhokrapur', and in his introduction he confesses he "made up" the name, and "it would be idle to explore the map", however in practice it could not realistically be mistaken for anywhere else.)

At the start of the book, Ackerley lists the "Principal Characters", aside from himself. Tellingly, only Indians appear on the list; despite their presence throughout, he includes no Europeans or Anglo-Indians here. Apart from the Maharajah, there is the Dewan (the Maharajah's Prime Minister), Babaji Rao (the Maharajah's private secretary), Abdul Haq (Ackerley's exasperating Hindi tutor), Narayan (Clerk of the Maharajah's Guest House), Sharma (the Maharajah's valet, and the apple of Ackerley's eye throughout the book), Hashim (waiter at the Guest House) and finally Habib, described as being "about twelve", Ackerley's miraculously over-zealous servant. Throughout the novel, and in common with the time, Ackerley refers to Muslims such as Abdul and Hashim as "Mohammedans".

Although a comic memoir, Hindoo Holiday is, certainly in terms of humour, comparatively free of what would be now termed racial profiling, even making allowances for the time of its writing. There is only one use of eye dialect (avay is used on a couple of occasions for "away"); instead, much of the comedy stems from Ackerley's struggles to come to terms with the complexities of Hinduism and the caste system, and most significantly from the comic timing of the dialogue. At no point are any Indians held up to ridicule; indeed Ackerley tends to reserve this for the pompous and often absurd Europeans who drift through the narrative - two cases in point being the preposterous Mrs Bristow, whose contrary, vacuous small-talk leaves Ackerley dumbfounded, and the architect Mr Bramble, who is engaged to construct a 'Greek Temple' for the Europhile Maharajah. Most of the Europeans emerge as comparatively one-dimensional, in contrast to the complex depictions of the Maharajah, with his profligate life and his homosexual attractions, or of the persona of Abdul, whose relentless pursuit of Ackerley for his own personal gain is more than counterbalanced by the stark poverty of his existence. In a passage written with not a hint of pathos, Abdul's meagre home life is described in vivid detail, before the narrative returns to an extensive series of interactions where Abdul attempts to extract money or influence (or both) from the hapless Ackerley.
