= Harry Daley =

First openly homosexual British policeman

Daley in police uniform, 1940s

Sergeant Harry Daley (14 November 1901 – 12 March 1971) was the first known openly gay British policeman. Born in Lowestoft he later moved to Dorking and, in 1925, to London where he joined the Metropolitan Police. Soon after joining the police, he met gay writer J. R. Ackerley and, through him, a number of other literary and artistic figures. Daley became the lover of writer E. M. Forster at the age of 25, a relationship that lasted seven years. After retiring from the police in 1950 and subsequently serving in the merchant navy he returned to Dorking where he lived with his brother and his partner. Daley wrote an autobiography that was published posthumously in 1986.

== Early life ==
Harry Daley was born in Lowestoft, Suffolk on 14 November 1901, the second youngest of five children of a working-class family. His father, Joseph Daley, was an orphan born in Poplar, London, who became the skipper of a fishing smack; his mother was Emily née Firman, a former parlourmaid. From the age of three Harry Daley was educated at the local school and when he was nine-years-old his father died at sea in a storm. Because of this Daley decided to help support his family by becoming a telegram boy rather than attending secondary school. During the First World War, his mother, fearing Zeppelin raids and a German invasion, moved the family to Dorking in 1916 and Daley found work as a grocer's delivery boy. Daley's sole elder brother, Joseph, was killed while serving in the Machine Gun Corps on the Western Front on 7 November 1918, just days before the end of the war.

While living at Dorking, Daley was fascinated by London and spent his weekends in the capital's theatres, cinemas, galleries and concert halls. He was also an avid reader and bought quantities of cheap books from second-hand shops. Daley recognised he was a homosexual during his childhood and referred to his sexuality as a "small cloud" that followed him. He noted that "my sexual inclinations were clearly defined. I was attracted to normal men, older, rougher and stronger than myself. Youthful innocence and freshness of outlook I found delightful, but never connected it with sexual desire".

== Police career ==
=== Hammersmith ===
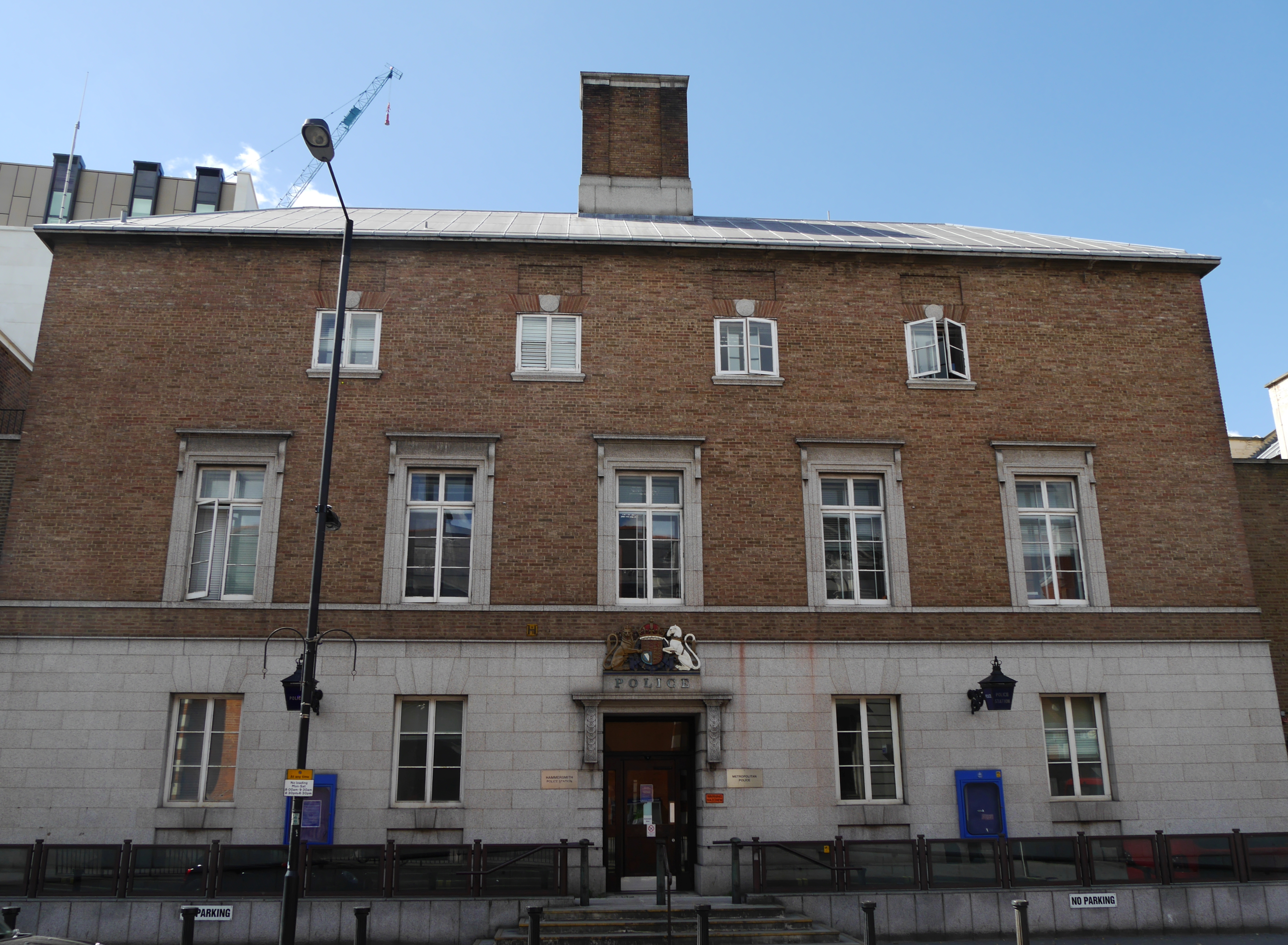
Hammersmith police station

Daley moved to London and applied to join the Metropolitan Police in 1925, starting his training at Peel House in March. Daley's first posting was to a station in Chiswick but he was soon moved to Hammersmith. At Hammersmith, Daley considered that the constables were under pressure to carry out arrests and issue summons. This resulted in many people being stopped and searched without suspicion, which Daley thought antagonised drunk members of the public and led to the arrest of persons in marginal cases such as workmen carrying home materials left-over from building sites. He stated that the policemen in Hammersmith augmented their wages by receiving bribes from bookmakers on their beat to "look the other way". Constables could receive a half crown (2.5 shillings) a day from each bookmaker at a time when weekly wages for a constable with two years service was £3 6s (66 shillings). Daley recalled collecting the half crown from the bookmaker on his beat from a window ledge. He also remembered receiving complaints when he took a day off and his replacement did not accept the bribe. Daley also described making more than 30 shillings in one day by helping motorists to park at the Olympia London exhibition centre, though a portion was passed on to his sergeant and the clerk at the police station. Daley considered that corruption decreased after the appointment of Lord Trenchard as commissioner in 1931: "when our superior officer were known to be honest, the majority of us followed suit".

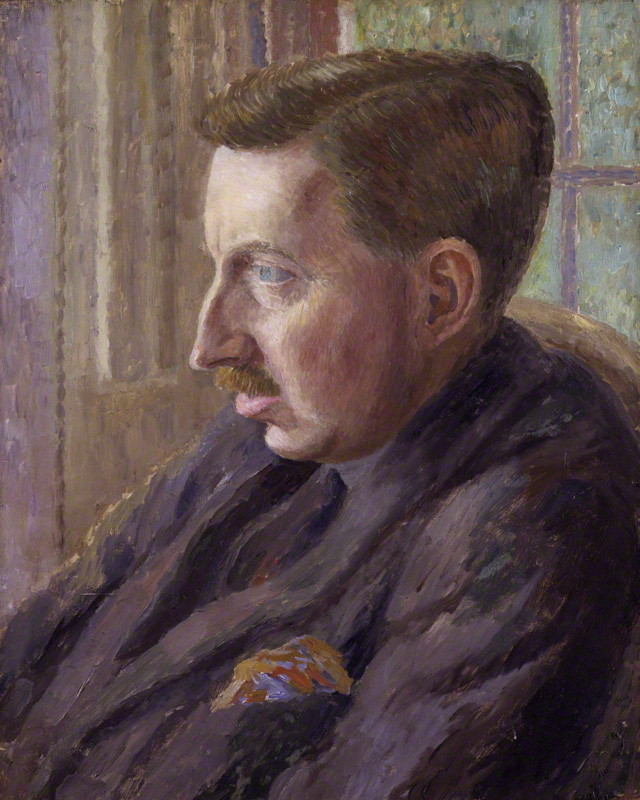
A 1924–25 painting of Forster

Soon after joining the police Daley met the gay writer J. R. Ackerley. Daley had seen Ackerley's The Prisoners of War at the Lyric Theatre, Hammersmith, and was intrigued by its homosexual theme; (Note: The Prisoners of War was first performed to the members-only 300 Club in 1925 but was soon granted a license to be performed at the Playhouse Theatre in London's West End. It depicts the unrequited love of an army captain for a fellow officer in a prisoner of war camp. The Prisoners of War was the first 20th-century play put on in the West End or Broadway to deal with homosexual desire. Its premise thought to have slipped past the Lord Chamberlain, who was responsible for censoring plays in this period.) While walking his beat Daley made the acquaintance of the writer one day when Ackerley was fetching the milk from his doorstep. The pair probably had a brief sexual relationship and remained lifelong friends afterwards. Through Ackerley, Daley came into contact with a wider circle of writers and artists, including those of the Bloomsbury Group, whose member Duncan Grant painted a portrait of Daley in 1931.

By the age of 25 Daley had become a lover of the writer E. M. Forster, a relationship that lasted for seven years. P. N. Furbank's 1978 biography of Forster notes that Daley was "plump, curly-haired, genial and rather cocky in manner: very intelligent, with a taste for music and opera, and a brilliant raconteur. He was homosexual and made no secret of it; indeed he was wildly indiscreet. His closest friends, and lovers, were mainly criminals." During this time Forster often accompanied Daley on his beat and Daley introduced him to a number of his working-class acquaintances. Forster considered that Daley was too indiscreet and friendly with criminals and ended their relationship in 1932. (Note: Forster had become involved with another policeman, Bob Buckingham, from 1930. Buckingham married in 1932 and his wife, May, ignored Daley's warnings that Forster would break up their marriage. The three maintained a largely-amicable love triangle relationship until Forster's 1970 death. Daley later acknowledged that "Bob was the man for Morgan [Forster], much more suitable than me, and I am glad that's how it ended.)

Daley was a keen amateur photographer and took photographs of some of the men he arrested, which included some of his lovers. The men were generally happy to pose for him, often doing so as they were escorted into black Marias. Daley was openly gay at a time when male homosexual activity was illegal in Britain and was the first openly gay British policeman. Daley was the subject of some discrimination from his colleagues, including offensive graffiti on the police station wall where a knot in a wood panel was made to resemble an anus and the words "love from 308" (Daley's collar number) written below, but regarded them as largely tolerant of his sexuality. He was a popular character with his colleagues and the public, which may have helped him to become accepted. His police colleagues apparently considered Daley different from the men they regularly arrested for homosexual soliciting.

In 1929 Daley was selected by Ackerley, in his role as a BBC radio producer, to give a series of talks about his police service and the work of Lowestoft fishermen. These talks, which were broadcast on shows including Children's Hour and While London Sleeps, may have helped inspire Ted Willis's 1955–76 television series Dixon of Dock Green. Some of Daley's talks, including "Not a Happy One?", broadcast on the Home Service on 25 March 1929, were published as articles in The Listener. Some broadcasts were made under his real name and others, particularly his accounts of criminal activities in London's street markets, under the pseudonyms of Jope Daley or Harry Firman.

=== Later career ===
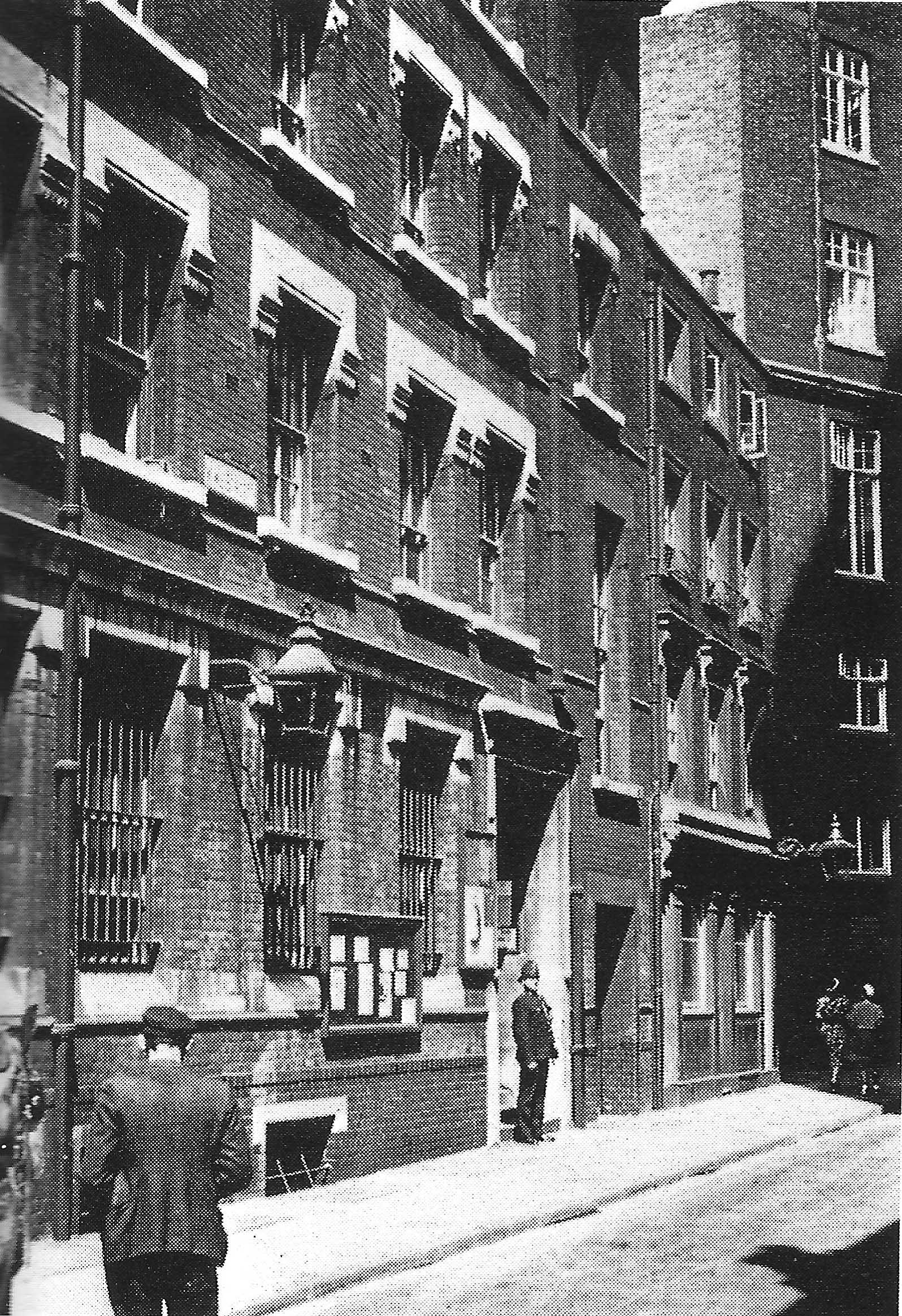
Vine Street police station circa 1940

In 1935, Daley was transferred to the station on Vine Street in Westminster. He observed the station officers maintained good relations with the West End prostitutes but that otherwise police corruption had markedly decreased in the area after a 1929 scandal. Daley, who was disgusted by fascism, noted that some of the younger constables were uniformed members of the British Union of Fascists and took part in distributing anti-Jewish propaganda. Daley recalled that during the Second World War the Vine Street officers were helped by Mrs Fisher, the Jewish wife of a local publican and in return they invited the Fishers to make use of the station's reinforced air raid shelter. Some of the blackshirt constables objected to this and Daley made himself unpopular by confronting them.

Daley's duties included responding to bomb explosions during The Blitz; he remembered attending one bombsite in which 27 women and children had been killed in a shelter and he had to trace the next of kin from a note in a mother's bloodied handbag. He also recalled officers he knew being given permission to join the armed forces and being killed in action soon after they finished their training. Daley moved to Wandsworth station in 1941, by which time he had been promoted to the rank of sergeant. During the war Daley wrote several short stories that he submitted to Ackerley, who was then the literary editor of The Listener; these were refused publication because they were judged to be "rather near the knuckle". After the war Daley was put on temporary staff duties, running a police recruitment centre on Beak Street, Soho. He found that he missed walking the beat and retired from the police on 21 May 1950.

== Later life and legacy ==
After retirement Daley spent some time as a master-at-arms in the merchant navy, but this career was cut short by a diagnosis of diabetes. In 1957 Daley retired to Dorking where he shared his mother's former home with his younger brother, David, and his brother's long-term partner, John. A local couple he befriended, recalled Daley as a friendly and intellectual man who read the New Statesman. He owned a collection of around 7,000 music records amassed since the 1920s and was a fan of chamber music and music halls. He enjoyed riding his bicycle and swimming in the River Mole.

Daley died from diabetes at Dorking General Hospital on 12 March 1971 aged 69, was cremated in Worth, West Sussex, and his ashes were scattered on Box Hill. On Ackerley's advice, Daley had written an autobiography that was posthumously published, as This Small Cloud, in 1986. The journalist Peter Burton, in reviewing This Small Cloud, for the Gay Times in 1987 described it as a "rare record of working-class gay experience". Because Daley fell out with Forster, his autobiography makes no mention of the writer or of Daley's Bloomsbury Group friends. Daley destroyed all his other written records before his death, leaving an estate worth £803.

A building connected to Daley was nominated for a blue plaque in 2017 but the application was declined by English Heritage, who did not consider him to be sufficiently historically significant; he cannot be re-nominated until 2027. (Note: English Heritage administers the Blue Plaque Scheme within Greater London, it has erected more than 1,000 plaques on buildings linked to historic figures. Candidates must be approved by a panel of experts and meet a number of criteria, including historical significance. English Heritage describe the approval process as "highly selective".) A chapter of Stephen Bourne's 2017 book, Fighting Proud: The Untold Story Of The Gay Men Who Served In Two World Wars, is about Daley.
