= Secret Orchards =

1979 English television film

- Genre: Drama
- Written by: William Trevor
- Directed by: Richard Loncraine
- Starring: Freddie Jones; Judy Parfitt
- Country of origin: England
- Original language: English

Production
- Producer: James Brabazon
- Cinematography: Peter Hannan
- Editor: Paul Green
- Production company: Granada Television

Original release
- Release: 1979

Secret Orchards is a 1979 TV movie directed by Richard Loncraine. The film is based on the memoirs My Father and Myself (1968) by J. R. Ackerley and his half-sister Diana Petre's Secret Orchard (1975). Their father, Roger Ackerley, had had two families for more than 20 years. He married J. R. Ackerley's mother years after their three children were born, as well as after his three daughters with Muriel Perry (including Sally Grosvenor, Duchess of Westminster) were born.
