= William Grosvenor, 3rd Duke of Westminster =

British peer (1894–1963)

His Grace The Duke of Westminster

Duke of Westminster
- In office 19 July 1953 – 22 February 1963
- Preceded by: Hugh Grosvenor
- Succeeded by: Gerald Grosvenor

Personal details
- Born: 23 December 1894
- Died: 22 February 1963 (aged 68)
- Resting place: Eccleston Church
- Parent(s): Lord Henry Grosvenor; Dora Erskine-Wemyss

William Grosvenor, 3rd Duke of Westminster (23 December 1894 – 22 February 1963) was a British landowner and aristocrat.

== Life ==
William Grosvenor was the son of Lord Henry George Grosvenor (1861–1914), a son of Hugh Grosvenor, 1st Duke of Westminster. His mother, Dora Mina Erskine-Wemyss, was the daughter of James Hay Erskine Wemyss, and a great-granddaughter of William IV.

He was brain-damaged at birth and required constant assistance. He succeeded his cousin, the 2nd Duke, as 3rd Duke of Westminster in 1953. After the death of his mother, he lived with his stepmother, the former Rosamund Angharad Lloyd, in a small house in the south of England. After his stepmother's death, the Duke lived in another house in Bath with a carer.

The Duke died in 1963 at the age of 68, unmarried and childless. He is buried in the churchyard of Eccleston Church near Eaton Hall, Cheshire. His titles passed to his cousin Gerald Grosvenor.

Coat of arms of the Dukes of Westminster

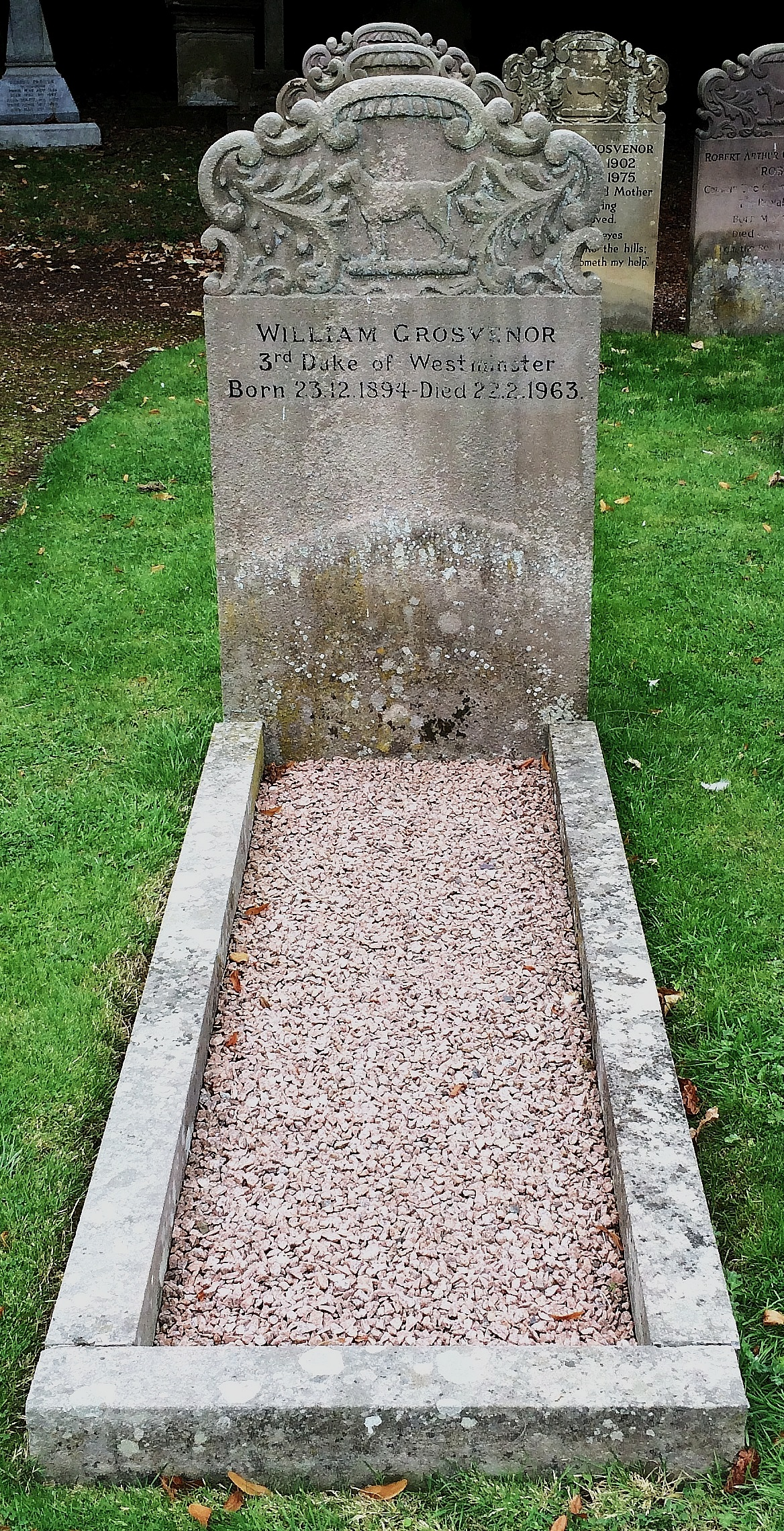
Grave of the 3rd Duke of Westminster

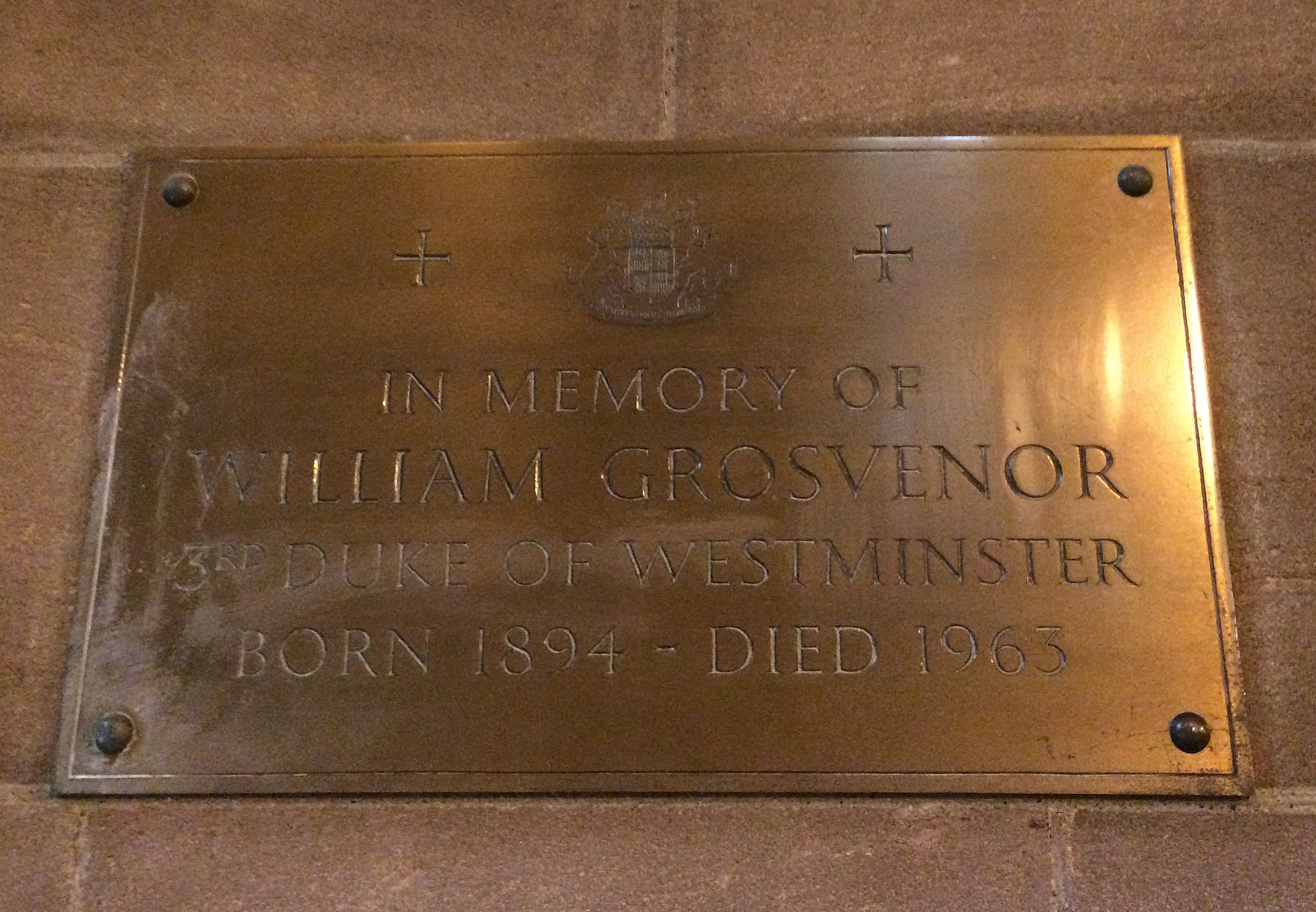
The 3rd Duke of Westminster's memorial tablet in Eccleston Church.

Peerage of the United Kingdom
Preceded by Hugh Grosvenor	Duke of Westminster; 1953–1963	Succeeded by Gerald Grosvenor
