= David Tringham =

English film director (1935–2022)

- Born: 13 March 1935; London
- Died: 30 November 2022 (aged 87); London
- Education: Bedford Modern School

David Lawrence Tringham (born 13 March 1935 – 30 November 2022) was a British film director, known in particular for Lawrence of Arabia, Ryan's Daughter, Highlander and Robin Hood: Prince of Thieves.

== Life ==
David Tringham was born in London, the son of George William Tringham of Grasse, France, and Madeleine Joyce (née de Courcy). He was educated at Bedford Modern School.

Tringham entered the film industry in 1955 under Sir Michael Balcon at Ealing Studios. As a first assistant director he has worked alongside, among others, Sir David Lean CBE, Joseph Losey, Richard Lester, Sidney Lumet, Don Siegel and John Schlesinger. One of his early roles was on the set of Lawrence of Arabia and his work has encompassed such films as Ryan's Daughter, Highlander, Robin Hood: Prince of Thieves and Incognito. Tringham has been the writer of numerous screenplays, and was the director and adaptor of the film, The Last Chapter. During his career, Tringham worked with some of the world's best known film directors, actors and actresses.

On 24 October 1961, Tringham married Annette Alberte, the daughter of Raymond Andre Schmitt of Paris. They had two daughters: Andréa Fréderique, born 18 March 1966, and Gaia Frances, born 3 April 1970. Tringham died on 30 November 2022.

== Filmography ==
- 2000 Bedazzled – Assistant Director (London Crew, 1st)
- 1999 The Mummy – Assistant Director
- 1997 Incognito – Assistant Director (1st)
- 1996 Mary Reilly – Assistant Director
- 1996 101 Dalmatians – Assistant Director (1st)
- 1995 White Squall – 2nd Unit Director
- 1993 A Foreign Field – Assistant Director
- 1993 The Innocent – 1st Assistant Director
- 1991 Robin Hood: Prince of Thieves – Assistant Director (1st)
- 1990 The Russia House – Assistant Director
- 1989 Henry V – Assistant Director
- 1989 Slipstream – 1st Assistant Director
- 1989 A Little Touch of Harry: The Making of Henry V – interviewee
- 1988 Mario Puzo's the Fortunate Pilgrim – 2nd Unit Director
- 1988 Hawks – Assistant Director
- 1988 Dirty Rotten Scoundrels – Assistant Director
- 1986 Duet for One – Assistant Director
- 1986 Highlander – Assistant Director
- 1986 Dream Lover – Assistant Director
- 1986 Little Shop of Horrors – 1st Assistant Director (Additional Shooting)
- 1986 Nazi Hunter: The Beate Klarsfeld Story – 1st Assistant Director
- 1985 Plenty – 1st Assistant Director
- 1985 13 at Dinner – 1st Assistant Director
- 1984 The Bounty – Assistant Director
- 1984 Agatha Christie's Ordeal by Innocence – Assistant Director
- 1984 The First Olympics: Athens 1896 – 1st Assistant Director
- 1983 The Hunger – Assistant Director
- 1982 Ivanhoe – 2nd Unit Director
- 1982 Witness for the Prosecution – Assistant Director
- 1982 The Adventures of Little Lord Fauntleroy – 1st Assistant Director
- 1981 An American Werewolf in London – 1st Assistant Director
- 1981 Outland – 1st Assistant Director
- 1980 The Biggest Bank Robbery – Assistant Director
- 1980 Rough Cut – Assistant Director
- 1979 Hanover Street – Assistant Director
- 1979 Cuba – Assistant Director
- 1978 Harold Robbins' "The Pirate" – 1st Assistant Director (2nd Unit Locations)
- 1977 Equus – Assistant Director
- 1977 The Man in the Iron Mask – Art Director
- 1977 Gulliver's Travels – Assistant Director
- 1976 Beauty and the Beast – 2nd unit director/assistant director
- 1976 Voyage of the Damned – Assistant Director
- 1975 Russian Roulette – Assistant Director
- 1974 The Last Chapter – Director and Screenplay
- 1974 Great Expectations – Assistant Director
- 1974 Cat and Mouse – Assistant Director
- 1974 The Great Gatsby – Assistant Director
- 1974 Juggernaut – 1st Assistant Director
- 1973 Si Puo Essere Piu Bastardi Dell'Ispettore CliffF? – Assistant Director
- 1973 Lady Caroline Lamb – 1st Assistant Director
- 1972 Captain Kronos - Vampire Hunter – Assistant Director
- 1972 Pope Joan – Assistant Director
- 1971 Nobody Ordered Love – Associate Producer and Assistant Director
- 1971 Mr. Forbush and the Penguins – Assistant Director
- 1971 I Want What I Want – Assistant Director
- 1971 The Playroom – 1st Assistant Director
- 1970 There's a Girl in My Soup – Assistant to the Director
- 1970 Figures in a Landscape – Assistant Director
- 1970 Ryan's Daughter – Assistant Director (Replacement)
- 1969 The Looking Glass War – Assistant Director
- 1968 The Magus – Assistant Director
- 1968 The Best House in London – Assistant Director
- 1968 How to Steal the World – Assistant Director
- 1968 Star! – 1st Assistant Director UK Locations
- 1967 Fathom – Assistant Director
- 1967 Pretty Polly – Assistant Director
- 1967 Slave Girls – Assistant Director
- 1966 The Witches – Assistant Director
- 1966 Maroc 7 – Assistant Director
- 1966 The Trap – Assistant Director
- 1965 Four in the Morning – Production Manager
- 1965 Gonks Go Beat – Assistant Director
- 1965 Catch Us If You Can – Assistant Director
- 1965 Sky West and Crooked – Assistant Director
- 1965 City Under the Sea – Assistant Director
- 1964 Stop-over Forever – 1st Assistant Director
- 1964 The Tomb of Ligeia – 1st Assistant Director
- 1964 Value Analysis – 1st Assistant Director
- 1964 Valley of the Kings – 1st Assistant Director
- 1963 Walk a Tightrope – Assistant Director
- 1963 The Six-sided Triangle – Assistant Director
- 1963 Impact – Assistant Director
- 1963 Clash by Night – First Assistant Director
- 1962 Master Spy – Assistant Director (1st)
- 1962 Lawrence of Arabia – Assistant Director (2nd); 1st Assistant Director, UK Locations
- 1961 Follow That Man! – Assistant Director
- 1961 The Third Alibi – First Assistant Director
- 1960 Watch Your Stern – Assistant Director (2nd)
- 1960 Light up the Sky! – 2nd Assistant Director
- 1960 Circle of Deception – 2nd Assistant Director
- 1960 Beyond the Curtain – 2nd Assistant Director
- 1959 Carry On Teacher – 2nd Assistant Director
- 1959 Ombre Bianche – 2nd Assistant Director
- 1959 Shake Hands with the Devil – 2nd Assistant Director
- 1958 A Night to Remember – Assistant Director (2nd)
- 1958 Carry On Sergeant – 2nd Assistant Director
- 1958 A Tale of Two Cities – 2nd Assistant Director (UK and Studio); 3rd Assistant Director (Location)
- 1958 Bachelor of Hearts – 2nd Assistant Director
- 1957 A King in New York – 3rd Assistant Director
- 1957 The Truth About Women – 3rd Assistant Director
- 1957 No Time for Tears – 3rd Assistant Director
- 1957 Ill Met by Moonlight – 3rd Assistant Director
- 1957 The Prince and the Showgirl – Additional Assistant Direction
- 1956 The Green Man – 3rd Assistant Director
- 1956 The Long Arm – 3rd Assistant Director
- 1956 The Feminine Touch – 3rd Assistant Director
- 1956 Who Done It? – 3rd Assistant Director
