= Gerald Grosvenor, 4th Duke of Westminster =

British aristocrat and officer (1907–1967)

Colonel His Grace The Duke of Westminster DSO PC DL

Personal details
- Born: 13 February 1907 London, England
- Died: 25 February 1967 (aged 60) Cheshire, England
- Spouse: Sally Perry (m. 1945)
- Parent(s): Lord Hugh Grosvenor; Lady Mabel Crichton
- Awards: Distinguished Service Order

Military service
- Allegiance: United Kingdom
- Branch/service: Army
- Rank: Colonel
- Commands: 9th Lancers

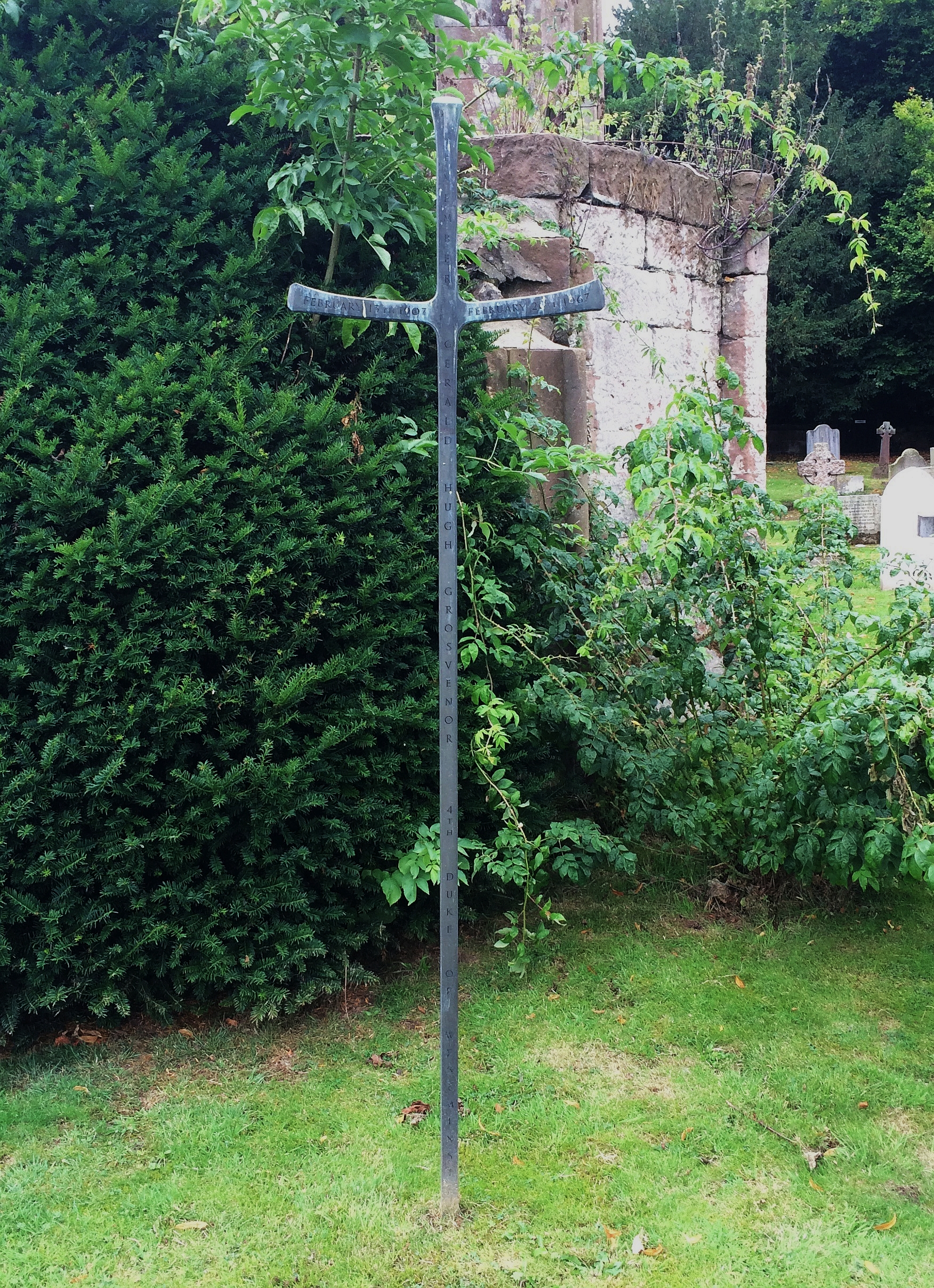
Grave of Gerald Grosvenor, 4th Duke of Westminster

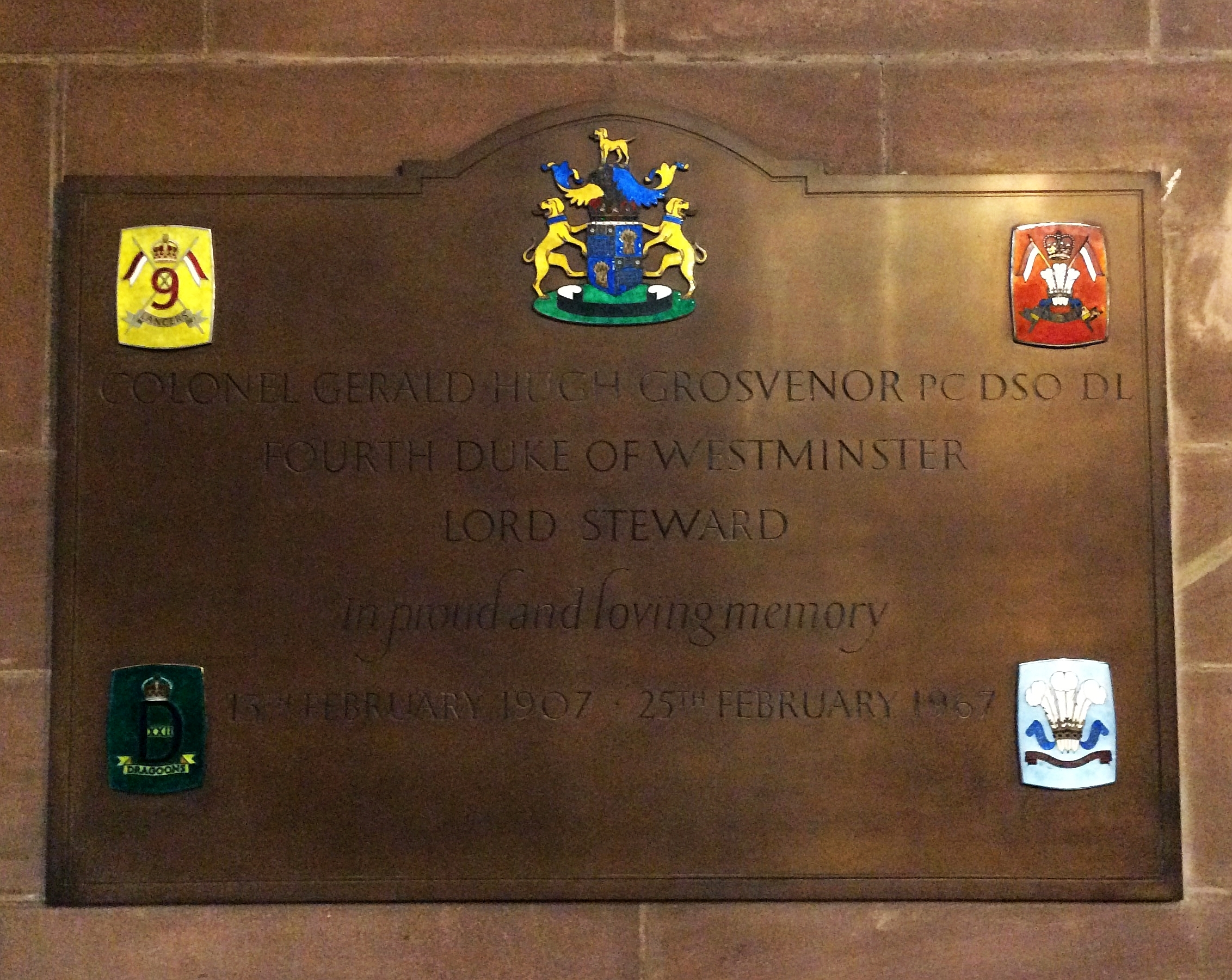
The 4th Duke of Westminster's memorial in Eccleston Church

Colonel Gerald Hugh Grosvenor, 4th Duke of Westminster DSO PC DL (13 February 1907 – 25 February 1967) was a British landowner and aristocrat.

== Early life ==
Gerald was the son of Captain Lord Hugh William Grosvenor and Lady Mabel Crichton and a grandson of Hugh Grosvenor, 1st Duke of Westminster.

He inherited his titles 1963 upon the death of his sixty-eight-year old cousin, William Grosvenor, 3rd Duke of Westminster, who died unmarried and childless.

== Career ==
He was commissioned into the 9th Lancers from the Royal Military College, Sandhurst, in 1926. He was promoted lieutenant in 1929, Captain in 1936, and major in 1943. From 1936 to 1938 he served as regimental adjutant and in 1938 he was appointed adjutant of the Nottinghamshire Yeomanry.

He commanded his regiment in the Second World War with the rank of lieutenant-colonel and was wounded in the leg by a shell splinter on 18 July 1944, suffering from attacks of septicaemia for the remainder of his life. In 1947 he was invalided out of the Army, but in 1950 was commissioned as a lieutenant in the Wiltshire Army Cadet Force.

In 1952, he was appointed as an Exon in the Yeomen of the Guard. On 18 February 1955, he was appointed honorary colonel of the Cheshire Yeomanry and on 19 May 1961, he was appointed colonel of the 9th/12th Royal Lancers. In 1959 he served as High Sheriff of Cheshire. He was made a Privy Counsellor in 1964.

== Personal life ==
On 11 April 1945, when he was third in line of succession to his eventual titles, he married Sally Perry, who was one of three extramarital daughters of Muriel Perry by Roger Ackerley. They were childless.

He is also known to have ordered the demolition of Alfred Waterhouse's Eaton Hall in 1963, at a time when Victorian architecture was unappreciated. It was replaced by a far smaller, modern house. At the time of the demolition, he was Britain's wealthiest peer.

He died in 1967, aged 60, and was buried in the churchyard of Eccleston Church near Eaton Hall, Cheshire. Upon his death, his titles passed to his younger brother, Robert Grosvenor.

Political offices
Preceded by The Duke of Hamilton	Lord Steward; 1964–1967	Succeeded by The Viscount Cobham
Military offices
Preceded by Sir Richard McCreery	Colonel of the 9th/12th Royal Lancers; 1961–1967	Succeeded by The Viscount Monckton of Brenchley
Honorary titles
Preceded by Vere Arbuthnot Arnold	High Sheriff of Cheshire; 1959	Succeeded by Ronald Henry Antrobus
Peerage of the United Kingdom
Preceded by William Grosvenor	Duke of Westminster; 1963–1967	Succeeded by Robert Grosvenor
