= Holland Tringham =

Joseph Holland Tringham
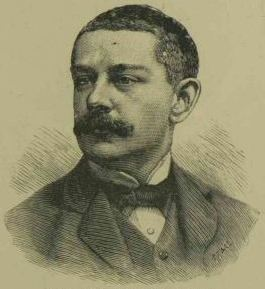
- Born: 10 October 1861; Hammersmith, London
- Died: 26 March 1908 (aged 46); Douglas, Isle of Man
- Occupation: Artist

Joseph Holland Tringham RBA (10 October 1861 – 26 March 1908) was an artist and illustrator in Victorian times. He received royal patronage, exhibited at the Royal Academy, and now has a pub named after him in Streatham, SW London.

His early life was spent in the Royal Navy, where he would enjoy himself sketching caricatures of his colleagues. When his boss saw a caricature of himself, Tringham duly got the sack. However, in time he became a really well known illustrator, with his work appearing in several periodicals such as the London Illustrated News.

As his fame spread, he joined fashionable society, and frequently had works exhibited at the Royal Academy. He was also commissioned to paint the portraits of King Edward VII and Queen Alexandra on at least two occasions, and received letters signed personally by the Queen. In 1905—1906 he accompanied the Prince and Princess of Wales on their tour of India.

He moved to Streatham in SW London in 1891, and is known at three addresses there, the last being 19 Greyhound Lane. He married Miss Beatrice Hall in 1886, but the marriage was dissolved in 1902, not long after the death of his mother. These events were accompanied by the development of photographic reproduction, which meant there was far less need for line illustrations in magazines, so his commissions started to dry up. He turned to alcohol, and the death of his former wife in February 1908 seems to have tipped him over the edge. To try to recover, he visited Douglas in the Isle of Man in 1908, but was arrested by a policeman who saw him behaving in a strange manner. The same night he was certified as insane and taken to the local lunatic asylum, where he died on 26 March 1908, aged 45.

His illustrations are plentiful in magazines of the time, most of them showing views around Greater London. He was also a prolific painter: one Streatham collector in Victorian times is known to have possessed no fewer than 150 of his paintings.

Although these rarely come onto the market, eleven of his watercolours appeared at auction in Folkestone in 2008, and are now in a private collection. Rather than showing London views, two of them show Lincoln Cathedral, while another two show Lincoln town centre. The others are scenes of the countryside, mostly featuring trees. In his lifetime he was said to be the finest tree painter in the world.

The Wetherspoons tavern at 107 Streatham High Road, SW16, was named the Holland Tringham, after Streatham's most famous artist. On its walls are reproduced six illustrations of old Streatham by Tringham.
