= John Symonds (surveyor) =

British Army engineer (1813–1852)

- Born: 10 December 1813
- Died: 9 August 1852 (aged 38); Argostoli, Cephalonia
- Military career
- Allegiance: United Kingdom
- Years of Service: 1833–1852
- Rank: Major
- Unit: Corps of Royal Engineers
- Awards: Naval General Service Medal (1847), 'Syria'

John Frederick Anthony Symonds (10 December 1813 – 9 August 1852) was a British Army officer and surveyor who carried out the first detailed survey of Palestine, together with Edward Aldrich; known as the 1840–41 Royal Engineers maps of Palestine, Lebanon and Syria.

Symonds was born in 1813, the third of four sons of Sir William Symonds, who was a Royal Navy Admiral and Surveyor of the Fleet, and his first wife, Elizabeth. His eldest brother was William Cornwallis Symonds. He was baptised along with his other brothers, Thomas and Jermyn, on 11 September 1816 in Fawley, Hampshire. His elder brother William Cornwallis Symonds (1810–1841) became an army captain.

He joined the Royal Engineers and was made 2nd Lieutenant in 1833, Lieutenant in 1836, 2nd Captain in 1845, Captain in 1850 and given the Army Rank of Major in 1846.

Following the intervention of the western powers in Syria and Palestine as a result of increasing tensions between Egypt and the Ottoman Empire Lieutenant Symonds was sent to the area in 1840. After surveying coastal forts he was sent to Jerusalem in early 1841, where he prepared an accurate map of the city. Later that year, at the age of only 26 or 27, he was ordered to carry out a complete trigonometrical survey of southern and central Palestine: the north would be surveyed by a different team. The survey was done by triangulation from the coast inland to the Dead Sea, using a 7-inch theodolite. Symond's calculations for the height of the Dead Sea was 1312 feet below sea level, compared with today's accepted figure of 1299 feet below sea level. In spite of the arduous conditions and sickness which affected the whole team, the exercise was completed in 10 weeks.

In 1843 he was awarded the Patron's Medal of the Royal Geographical Society for "his triangulation over Palestine and for his determination of the difference between the level of the Mediterranean and the Dead Sea".

He died at Argostoli, on the Greek island of Cephalonia in 1852.
