= 1867 Pensioner Settlements by-election =

New Zealand by-election

The 1867 Pensioner Settlements by-election was a by-election held in the multi-member then single member Pensioner Settlements electorate during the 4th New Zealand Parliament, on 5 August 1867.

The by-election was caused by the resignation of incumbent MP Paul Frederick de Quincey on 1 July 1867.

The successful candidate was John Kerr.

Kerr was declared duly elected as the only eligible candidate, as Mr J. J. Jackson's name was not on the current electoral roll (though he was registered for next year). Jackson had been proposed by Hugh McNeil and seconded by John Lord.
