= Pensioner Settlements (electorate) =

Pensioner Settlements was a 19th-century parliamentary multi-member electorate in the Auckland region of New Zealand, from 1853 to 1870.

== Geographic distribution ==
The electorate was in South Auckland, based on the settlements or suburbs of Howick, Onehunga, Otahuhu, and Panmure where the Fencibles lived, retired former British soldiers who were available to defend Auckland during the New Zealand Wars.

== History ==
Pensioner Settlements was one of the original electorates used for the 1st Parliament elected in 1853; and existed until the end of the 4th Parliament on 30 December 1870. In 1871, several new electorates were created in Auckland.

The first election was held on 13 August 1853. Three candidates contested the two available positions. Joseph Greenwood and John Bacot were returned, with Theodore Haultain being unsuccessful.

Captain Symonds was elected on 30 April 1858. De Quincey was elected in the 1866 general election, but he resigned soon after. The 5 August 1867 by-election was won by John Kerr. A second person, with the surname Jackson, was nominated, but the returning officer would not accept the nomination, as Jackson was not on the electoral roll. Thus, Kerr was declared elected unopposed.

== Members of Parliament ==
The electorate was represented by seven Members of Parliament. From 1853 to 1860, it was a two-member electorate. For the 3rd and 4th Parliaments, it was a single-member electorate.

Key

Independent

=== Multi-member electorate ===
Election	Winners	
1853 election	John Bacot	Joseph Greenwood
1855 election	John Williamson	Joseph Greenwood
1858 by-election	John Williamson	Captain Jermyn Symonds

=== Single-member electorate ===
Election	Winner
1861 election	William Mason
1866 election	Paul Frederick de Quincey
1867 by-election	John Kerr

== Election results ==
=== 1858 by-election ===
1858 Pensioner Settlements by-election
Party	Candidate	Votes	%	±%
Independent	Jermyn Symonds	262	52.6	
Independent	Captain Balneavis	236	47.4	
Turnout		498		
Majority		26		
