= William Chisholm Wilson =

New Zealand newspaper proprietor (1810–1876)

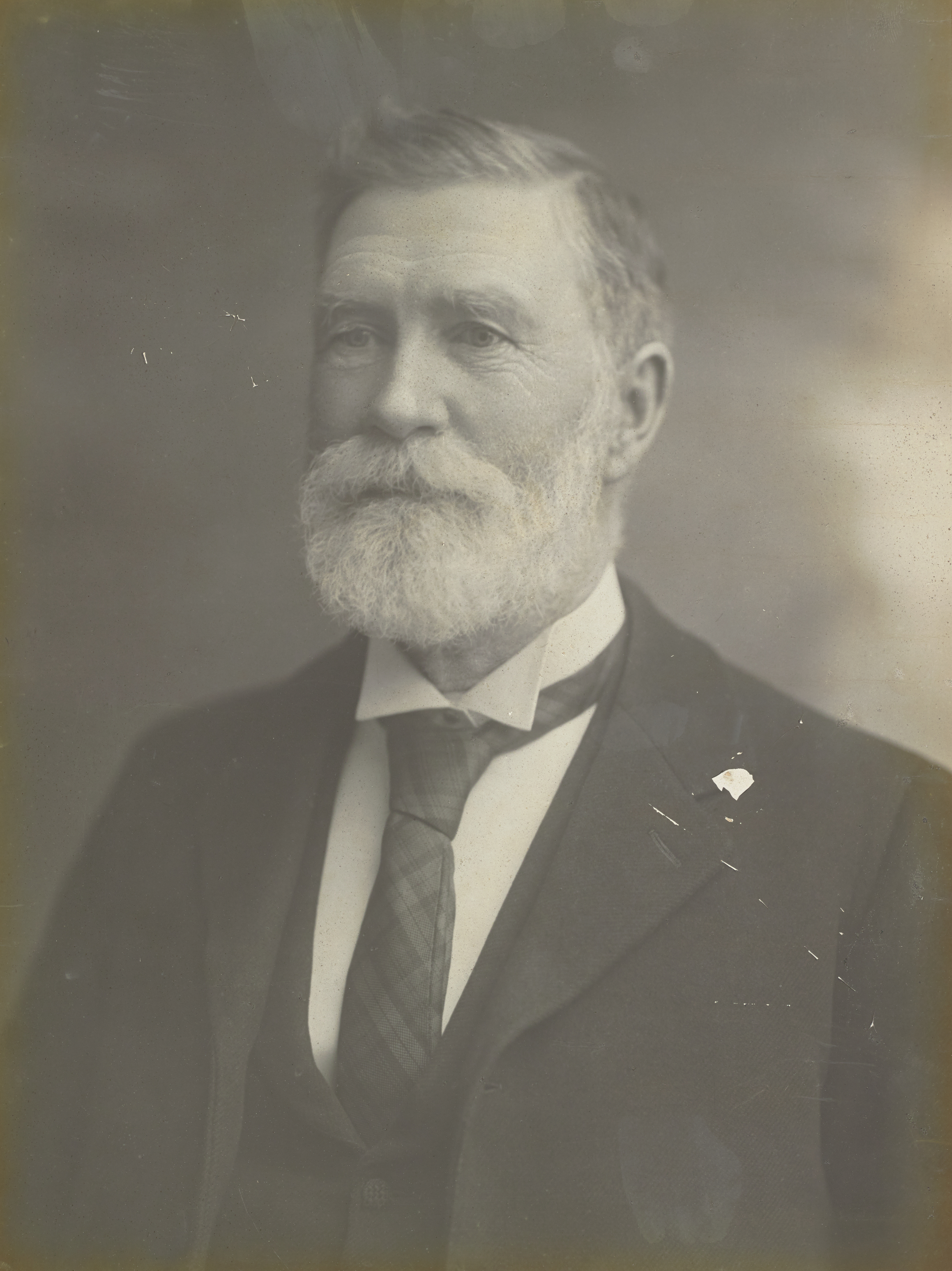
- Wilson (year unknown)
- Born: 1810; Nigg, Highland, Scotland
- Died: 5 July 1876 (aged 66); Shortland Street, Auckland, Colony of New Zealand
- Resting place: Symonds Street Cemetery
- Known for: Founder of The New Zealand Herald

William Chisholm Wilson (1810 – 5 July 1876) was a newspaper proprietor in Auckland, New Zealand. Born in Scotland, he became a printer by trade and moved as a young, married man to Tasmania and then Sydney, where he worked for newspapers. He came to Auckland in mid-1841 in conjunction with his friend John Williamson. They were business partners for many years, publishing the newspaper The New-Zealander. After editorial disagreements, Wilson left the partnership and some months later started The New Zealand Herald, which soon became a dominant newspaper. Wilson was on the board of or had shares in many companies. He died in 1876 after a long illness, with his newspaper carried on by his two sons.

== Early life ==
Wilson was born in 1810 in Nigg in Easter Ross, Scotland. He served an apprenticeship in Edinburgh as a printer. He married in 1832.

== Career ==
Shortly after his marriage, the Wilsons emigrated to Tasmania, where he and his wife spent three or four years. They went to Sydney afterwards where he worked in the news publishing trade. In 1841, he connected with his old friend John Williamson. They both moved to Auckland to work for the Government Printing Department in mid-1841. Wilson, who was a Wesleyan, arrived on the Sophia Pate on 13 August 1841. The Sophia Pate had been chartered by Wesleyans from Sydney who wanted to settle in Kaipara Harbour. After leaving Auckland, the Sophia Pate was wrecked on a sandbar when trying to enter Kaipara Harbour with the loss of 21 lives.

Wilson was one of the fathers of New Zealand journalism. Williamson founded the newspaper The New-Zealander in Auckland in 1845. Wilson joined him as a partner on 1 January 1848. Wilson introduced the first Caxton printing machine into New Zealand, and also established the first gasworks, having purchased a small plant to light his own offices. Differences with his partner over the policy of the paper led to a dissolution in 1863, and a few months later Wilson started The New Zealand Herald. The New-Zealander went into a declined and its office burned down on 7 May 1866, after which the newspaper stopped.

In connection with The Herald, Wilson started a weekly issue. Although unwilling to enter public life, Wilson actively assisted in founding many Auckland institutions, among the most noteworthy being the Bank of New Zealand and the New Zealand Insurance Company, of which he remained a director until his death. The Herald under his management became the leading morning paper in the colony. After his death, the business was carried on by his sons, W. S. and J. L. Wilson, who had previously assisted in its management. They entered into partnership with Alfred Horton, who had purchased The Southern Cross, the other morning journal, from Julius Vogel, and the two papers were amalgamated, The Southern Cross becoming merged into The Herald and the weekly issue of the latter paper losing its identity in the Weekly News, an older journal published in connection with The Southern Cross.

== Death ==
Illness forced Wilson to become less active with the management of his newspaper in his last two years. For his last six months, he was very ill. He died at his home in Shortland Street on 5 July 1876 aged 66 and was buried at Symonds Street Cemetery. Three children survived him. His wife died in 1885.
