= 1858 Pensioner Settlements by-election =

New Zealand by-election

The Pensioner Settlements by-election 1858 was a by-election held in the multi-member Pensioner Settlements electorate during the 2nd New Zealand Parliament, on 29 April 1858.

The by-election was caused by the resignation of incumbent MP Joseph Greenwood and was won by Jermyn Symonds. On nomination day (28 April) Jermyn Symonds and Captain Balneavis were nominated, and after a show of hands in favour of Symonds, Balneavis demanded a poll. John Symonds was subsequently elected the following day.

== Results ==
1858 Pensioner Settlements by-election
Party	Candidate	Votes	%	±%
Independent	Jermyn Symonds	262	52.6	
Independent	Captain Balneavis	236	47.4	
Turnout		498		
Majority		26		
