= Thomas Symonds (Royal Navy officer, died 1792) =

British naval captain

Captain Thomas Symonds (bapt. 10 August 1731 –1792) was a British naval captain of the American Revolutionary War.

Symonds was the second son of the Rev John Symonds, rector of Horringer, Suffolk, and his wife, Mary Spring (died 1774), daughter of Sir Thomas Spring of Pakenham and Hon. Merelina Jermyn, daughter of Thomas Jermyn. His elder brother was academic John Symonds (1730–1807). According to Sir William Symonds' memoirs, the boys learned young that John, as the eldest son, would inherit the family estates:

"[John and Thomas] were informed that all the property would be left to John, the eldest; and Tom was cautioned by his mother not to hang upon his brother. Being a very spirited boy, he took this injunction so much to heart that he left the house immediately, with his clothes tied in a bundle over his shoulder, and keeping his intentions to himself, trudged off to Harwich, where he was invited to try his luck at sea, by the captain of a vessel of war, who had been staying with his father. He was not heard of again until he had become a Master and Commander in the Navy, when he paid a short visit to his brother."

He entered the Royal Navy as a Lieutenant on 22 May 1755 and served on the Elizabeth, the Grafton and the Borwick (Pitcairn-Jones Naval List).

On 18 February 1762, he was appointed Commander of the sloop Albany and was ordered to join Commodore Young's squadron then blockading the estuaries of the rivers Seine and Orne, France.

The Albany joined that squadron on 8 July 1762.

On 13 July 1762, he was the commanding officer of a flotilla of small boats which, in a night raid, attempted to destroy landing barges moored in the river Orne. The attack failed.

The following Court-Martial found Thomas Symonds "guilty of acting in a manner not becoming to an officer". He lost command of the Albany.

In 1771, he attained post rank of Captain and took command of the "Captain". In 1776 he was captain of the "Solebay" which took part in the bombardment of Fort Moultrie overlooking Charleston Harbour.

In 1780, in England, he replaced John Luttrell as captain of HMS Charon, and sailed for America with a naval force. On 13 August 1780 the Charon accepted after a lengthy engagement the surrender of the Comte d'Artois, a French privateer off the Irish coast. After successful anti-convoy operations on the Atlantic crossing and coastal cruising, the ship became trapped in the York River, Virginia, where Symonds took supreme command of British naval forces in America. Charon was destroyed and sunk with red-hot shot soon afterwards. At the end of the siege of Yorktown, it was he (as the most senior naval officer present) and Charles Cornwallis, Lieutenant General of the British Armed Forces, who signed the Articles of Capitulation on 18 October 1781. After his release as a prisoner of war he was appointed Captain of the Diadem.

Thomas Symonds died in his brother's house in Bury St Edmunds on 25 May 1792.

He is buried in Pakenham Church where there is a mural tablet to his memory and to that of his son, Jermyn John, Commander RN who was the commander of the Helena, a sloop of 14 guns which was lost with him and all his crew in a gale off the Dutch coast in October 1796 (some authorities put the loss as 3 November 1796).

Thomas Symonds married twice, first to Mary Noble who died in 1777 and who is buried in St James's church in Bury, secondly to Elizabeth Mallet.

In his Will, proved 15 June 1792, Thomas Symonds left bequests to his wife Elizabeth, to his sons Jermyn John, Thomas Edward, and John Charles and to his daughters, Mary Anne, Elizabeth, Juliana, Merelina, and Sophia

His daughter was Mary Anne Whitby, his son was William Symonds, Surveyor of the Navy, and his grandsons included William Cornwallis Symonds, Thomas Symonds, Julian Symonds, and Jermyn Symonds.
