= William Symonds =

British Navy surveyor

Rear-Admiral Sir William Symonds CB FRS
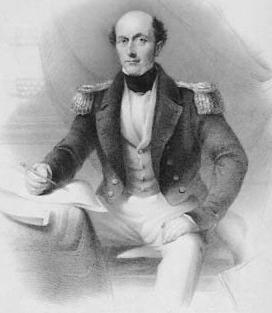
- Sir William Symonds, by Edward Morton, 1850 (after Henry Wyndham Phillips)
- Born: 24 September 1782; Bury St Edmunds, Suffolk
- Died: 30 March 1856 (aged 73); Aboard the French steamship Nil in the Strait of Bonifacio, off Sardinia
- Relatives: Thomas Symonds (father); Mary Anne Whitby (sister); William Cornwallis Symonds (son); Thomas Symonds (son); Julian Symonds (son); Jermyn Symonds (son)
- Military career
- Allegiance: United Kingdom
- Branch: Royal Navy
- Service years: 1794–1856
- Rank: Rear admiral (rank granted on retirement)
- Conflicts: Groix
- Awards: FRS, knighthood, civil Companion of the Bath
- Other work: Surveyor of the Navy

Sir William Symonds CB FRS (24 September 1782 – 30 March 1856, aboard the French steamship Nil, Strait of Bonifacio, Sardinia) was Surveyor of the Navy in the Royal Navy from 9 June 1832 to October 1847, and took part in the naval reforms instituted by the Whig First Lord of the Admiralty Sir James Robert George Graham in 1832.

== Life ==
=== Early life ===
Symonds was the second son of naval captain Thomas Symonds (1731–1792) and his second wife, and first went to sea on, HMS London, in September 1794. Serving in Lord Bridport's fleet at the Battle of Groix on 23 June 1795 and during the 1797 Spithead mutiny, he was promoted to lieutenant on 14 October 1801. However, despite service at sea for the whole duration of the Napoleonic Wars (in which experiences of being outsailed by French ships left him with an obsession for speed, wide beams and sharp design in his later designs for sailing ships) and showing fine seamanship, he was promoted no further (though between 1819 and 1825 he was captain of the port at Malta).

=== Experiments in naval architecture ===
Using a minor legacy from Admiral Sir William Cornwallis (who left his estate to his best friend's widow, Symonds's sister), in 1821 Symonds built an experimental yacht, which was copied by the rich yachtsman George Vernon, who aided his publication of a pamphlet on naval architecture. Vernon also convinced the Admiralty to employ Symonds as a corvette designer, with promotion to commander, by standing his surety with a bond of £20,000 should Symonds fail in his designs, and by then introducing him to the Duke of Portland in December 1826. Of his two yacht designs for the Duke, one (Pantaloon, 1832) was later bought by the Admiralty for adaptation as a 10 gun brig. When Portland entered George Canning's Cabinet in April 1827, he then promoted Symonds as a designer to the Lord High Admiral, the Duke of Clarence, who appointed Symonds to the royal yacht and granted him his captaincy on 5 December the same year. Sailing trials in 1827 and 1831 were won by Symonds's entries, and (with Clarence's accession as William IV, the Whig abolition of the Navy Board and Earl Grey's ministry) he was taken on to design a 50 gun frigate, which he named HMS Vernon after his patron.

=== Naval surveyor ===
Symonds was appointed the Surveyor of the Navy on 9 June 1832 by Sir James Graham, the Whig First Lord of the Admiralty. He was intended to control the Navy's dockyards and shipbuilding programme, but (thanks to his title of Surveyor of the Navy and the vague wording of the instructions given him) he also began to meddle in ship design, forcing the Navy to adopt his designs despite much opposition to this, to his appointment being a political one rather than one based on aptitude, and to his position as a favourite of the king (who, for example, omitted to inform the Admiralty of his intention to make him a Knight Bachelor but still went ahead with it, on 15 June 1836 at St James's Palace). He also became a Fellow of the Royal Society in June 1835.

Ship-design was no longer the important part of Surveyor's role that it had been, and so Symonds was its first holder to have been an amateur ship-designer rather than a professional shipwright. Nevertheless, the observations and experience gained in such design allowed him to introduce radical changes to ship design, such as widening Navy ships' beams and making their bottoms more wedge-shaped (to decrease the amount of ballast needed and to increase stability, speed, stowage and the weight of guns that could be carried). (However, with the decline in the sailing navy, most of Symonds's huge wooden sailing designs—larger, heavier-rigged, wider-beamed, more spacious for working their guns and heavier armament than ever before—became obsolete with the decline of sail and were later converted to steam-screw.)

During his time in office, he also took on George Rennie's suggestion of creating watertight compartments in ships (something first suggested for the Royal Navy by Samuel Bentham). In 1840 he privately published a book of sketches of men-of-war and yachts, under the title "Naval Costume". He also travelled much overseas, accurately observing the timber resources and navies of foreign powers such as the Russian Baltic and Black Sea Fleets (whose inefficiency at a time of increased Anglo-Russian tension proved a useful observation). This informed his reporting of British oak supplies from the forest of Dean and the New Forest, improved timber supplies and (along with a new means of construction invented by the talented Chief Clerk in the Surveyor's Office, John Edye, who also provided the detail for Symonds's more than 200 designs for the Navy) allowed Symonds to create larger and larger wooden warships. These were able not only to defeat an enemy by weight of fire (as the Navy had long been able to do) but also to pursue them and force battle. Despite his feeling that steam was only an adjunct to a sailing navy rather than the future of naval propulsion (based on his correct assertion that the a wooden warship's stern would be weakened by adding a steam screw), Symonds did also produce some steam paddle-wheel designs.

However, Symonds's "empirical" school of shipbuilding came into conflict both with the "scientific" school led by the new class of professional naval architects and the first School of Naval Architecture (closed in 1832), and with the "traditional" school led by Master Shipwrights from the Royal Dockyards. Autocratic in office, demanding obedience and support from subordinates and superiors alike and taking any criticism or suggested alteration to his designs as a personal slight, he turned on his opponents in the pamphlet Facts versus Fiction (1844). Determined to prove Symonds's designs to be failures, the new Tory Board of Admiralty sent out successive "Experimental Squadrons" in 1844, 1845 and 1846. Outside factors such as individual captains' political bias or stowage's influence on how well a ship sailed were underappreciated in these trials—the success of Symonds's designs depended on the skill of their captains (they handled badly under clumsy ones, or ones opposed to him, but very well under skilled commanders)—whilst his larger ships were fast but unsuited to use as gun platforms due to rolling too rapidly. They did, however, handle well in all but the worst weather. Nevertheless, in the face of the Tory First Sea Lord Lord Ellenborough's institution of a "Committee of Reference" in 1846 to oversee Symonds and modify his designs according to the Board's wishes, a command to make a radical alteration to his design for a new 90 gun ship, and loss of most of his Whig support even on their return to power in July 1846, Symonds resigned his role in October 1847 (despite retaining the Duke of Portland's continued support), and was succeeded by Sir Baldwin Walker.

=== Retirement ===
Despite his fall from grace, he was granted an Order of the Bath (civil) on 1 May 1848, and in June 1853 James Graham, having again become First Lord of the Admiralty, was convinced by the Duke of Portland to take Symonds back on, as the Queen's naval Aide-de-Camp. Becoming a retired rear admiral the following year, he and his third wife from then on lived abroad, principally in Malta and Italy, for reasons of his health. He died at sea in 1856, en route from Malta to Marseille, and was buried at the Protestant Cemetery at the latter. His will required the publication of a biography in his favour – this repeated the arguments over his sailing-ship designs despite the Navy's having long abandoned sail by this date.

== Family ==
On 21 April 1808, William married Elizabeth Saunders Luscombe, daughter of Matthew Luscombe of Plymouth. They had one daughter and four sons:

- Theresa Aubrina Symonds (1808 – 19 January 1872), married Daniel Smith Bockett, and had 18 children
- William Cornwallis Symonds (1810–1841), eldest son, who became an army captain, a member of the Royal Geographical Society and Deputy Surveyor-General of New Zealand, but was drowned in November 1841 when a boat carrying him across the Manukau Harbour capsized. Symonds Street in Auckland is named after him.
- Sir Thomas Matthew Charles Symonds (1811–1894), Royal Navy officer
- Julian Frederick Anthony Symonds (1813–1852), Army surveyor
- John Jermyn Symonds (1816–1883), who stayed in New Zealand after his brother William's death; Symonds Street in Onehunga is named after him.

After Elizabeth's death from tuberculosis on 10 November 1817, William remarried on 10 March 1818, Elizabeth Mary, daughter of Rear-Admiral Philip Carteret, of Trinity Manor, Jersey. After her death, he married a third and final time, in 1851, to Susan Mary, daughter of the Rev. John Briggs.

== Bibliography ==
- A. D. Lambert, The last sailing battlefleet: maintaining naval mastery, 1815–1850 (1991)
- J. A. Sharp, Memoirs of the life and services of Admiral Sir William Symonds (1858)
- A. S. Turberville, A history of Welbeck Abbey and its owners, 2 vols. (1938–9), vol. 2
- Cape Town University Library, Walker manuscripts (MSS)
- NMM, Minto MSS · TNA: PRO, Admiralty MSS
- University of Nottingham Library, Portland MSS
- British Library, Martin MSS and Peel MSS
- D. K. Brown, Before the ironclad (1990)
- National Archives, Ellenborough MSS
- C. J. Bartlett, Great Britain and sea power, 1815–1853 (1963)
- F. Boase, Modern English Biography: containing many thousand concise memoirs of persons who have died since the year 1850, 6 vols. (privately printed, Truro, 1892–1921); repr.(1965)
- Royal Military College of Canada, Kingston, Ontario, Massey Library, bound plans relating to system of classifying ships

== See also ==
- O'Byrne, William Richard (1849). "Symonds, William" . A Naval Biographical Dictionary . John Murray – via Wikisource.

== Sources ==
- Lambert, Andrew. "Symonds, William". Oxford Dictionary of National Biography (online ed.). Oxford University Press. doi:10.1093/ref:odnb/26893. (Subscription, Wikipedia Library access or UK public library membership required.)
- http://www.pdavis.nl/Experimental.htm
- Falmouth Packet archive
- Book Review: Shipping, Technology, and Imperialism: Papers Presented to the Third British-Dutch Maritime History Conference
- Portrait of him
