= Henry Balneavis =

New Zealand soldier and public servant

Henry Colin Balneavis (15 March 1818 – 26 August 1876) was a New Zealand soldier and public servant.

He was born in Ghent, United Kingdom of the Netherlands, the son of Lieutenant-General Henry Balneavis, a British Army officer and colonel commandant of the 65th Regiment. At the age of 19, he was granted a commission in the 58th Regiment, which brought him to New Zealand in 1846. He played key roles on the British side of the New Zealand Wars until 1858, when he retired on half-pay with the New Zealand War Medal and a grant of land at Maraetai, and again from 1862 to 1864 during which he was made a lieutenant-colonel.

Balneavis married Meri Makarina Hineahua (of Te Whakatōhea) and had six children: Hemaima, Louisa Hineiahua, Henry, Georgina, John Henry, and Mary. Hemaima, or Jemima, married John Shera, while John Henry's son was Te Raumoa Balneavis.

He contested the 1858 Pensioner Settlements by-election, but was beaten by Captain Symonds. Later he became Sheriff of Auckland as well as returning officer, and was the Italian Consul: as well as English he could also speak Italian, Arabic, Maltese, French, and Māori. At the time of his death he was especially remembered as the first violin of the Choral Society.
