= Theresa Cornwallis West =

British author (1806–1886)

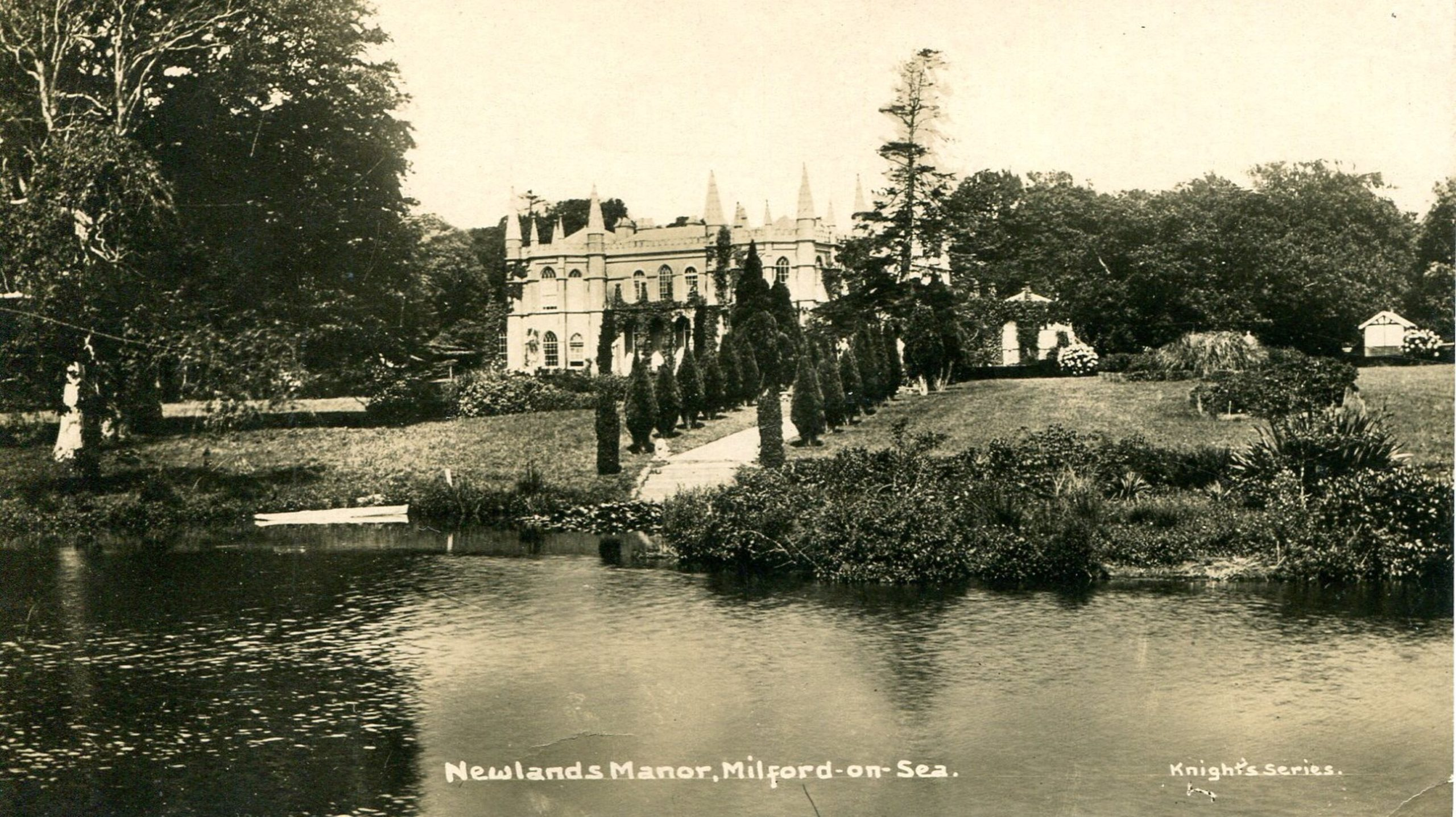
Newlands Manor, Hampshire, Milford, postcard, c. 1900s

Theresa Cornwallis West (née Whitby; 1806–1886) (Mrs F. West) was a British writer. She is most noted for her A Summer Visit to Ireland in 1846 and wrote stories for children, young adults and even a novel for adults (The Doom of Doolandour). Her travelogue, written as a member of the English upper class visiting Ireland as a tourist, in the early stages of the Famine has proven a valuable source of both information and views.

She was born at Newlands Manor, Hampshire to the Royal Navy Captain John Whitby (flag captain for Admiral Sir William Cornwallis) and Mary Anne Theresa Whitby (1783–1850) (née Symonds, the writer, landowner, artist and reintroducer of sericulture to England). Theresa married, in 1827, Frederick Richard West (1799–1862) of Ruthin Castle and unlike his first wife bore children and went on to outlive him.

== Selected works ==
- West, Theresa Cornwallis Whitby., 1847. A summer visit to Ireland in 1846. London: R. Bentley.
- West, Theresa Cornwallis, 1884. The Doom of Doolandour. A Chronicle of Two Races. London: Wyman & Sons
- West, Theresa Cornwallis J., 1876. All for an Ideal: a Girl's dream of a past period.
- West, Theresa Cornwallis J., 1883. God's Arithmetic: with other stories for the young. London: Partridge & Co.
- West, Theresa Cornwallis J., 1855. Frescoes and Sketches from Memory. J. Mitchell, London
- West, Theresa Cornwallis J., 1903. For the Sake of a Crown: a tale of the Netherlands. Religious Tract Society: London.
