= John Kerr (Auckland politician) =

New Zealand politician

New Zealand Parliament
Years	Term	Electorate	Party
1867–1870	4th	Pensioner Settlements	Independent

John Kerr was a 19th-century Member of Parliament in Auckland, New Zealand.

He represented the Pensioner Settlements electorate from 1867 to 1870, but was defeated for the new Eden electorate in 1871.

New Zealand Parliament
Preceded by Paul Frederick de Quincey	Member of Parliament for Pensioner Settlements; 1867–1870	Constituency abolished
