= Thomas Symonds (Royal Navy officer, died 1894) =

Royal Navy Admiral of the Fleet (1811-1894)

Admiral of the Fleet Sir Thomas Symonds GCB
- Born: 31 October 1811; Milford-on-Sea, Hampshire, England
- Died: 14 November 1894 (aged 83); Sunny Hill, Higher Warberry, Torquay, England
- Relatives: William Symonds (father); Thomas Symonds (grandfather); Mary Anne Whitby (aunt); William Cornwallis Symonds (brother); Jermyn Symonds (brother)
- Military career
- Allegiance: United Kingdom
- Branch: Royal Navy
- Service years: 1825–1883
- Rank: Admiral of the Fleet
- Commands: HMS Rover; HMS Spartan; HMS Arethusa; Channel Fleet; Plymouth Command
- Conflicts: Crimean War
- Awards: Knight Grand Cross of the Order of the Bath

Admiral of the Fleet Sir Thomas Matthew Charles Symonds, GCB (31 October 1811 – 14 November 1894) was a Royal Navy officer. He was commanding officer of HMS Arethusa that participated in the bombardment of Sevastopol during the Crimean War.

Symonds became Admiral Superintendent at Devonport Dockyard and then Commander-in-Chief, Channel Squadron. In that capacity he invented the scalene triangle naval formation, replacing the older isosceles triangle naval formation, and earned himself a reputation as a tactician. He also carried out an investigation into the design of the turret ships HMS Monarch and HMS Captain and concluded that the turret ships were "formidable" and would, by superior armament, destroy any opposing broadside ships. He went on to be Commander-in-Chief, Plymouth.

Symonds led an active retirement, writing letters and pamphlets to The Times arguing in favour of changes to ship design and a stronger navy. He also wrote an open letter to the British press regarding the naval armour tests by the United States Navy at Annapolis arguing that the compound-armour used in the design of the British Trafalgar-class battleships was defective. He then issued a nine-column, eleven-point statement as a Christmas supplement to all the service papers entitled "The Truly Perilous State of Great Britain Should War Occur between France and Ourselves".

== Early life ==
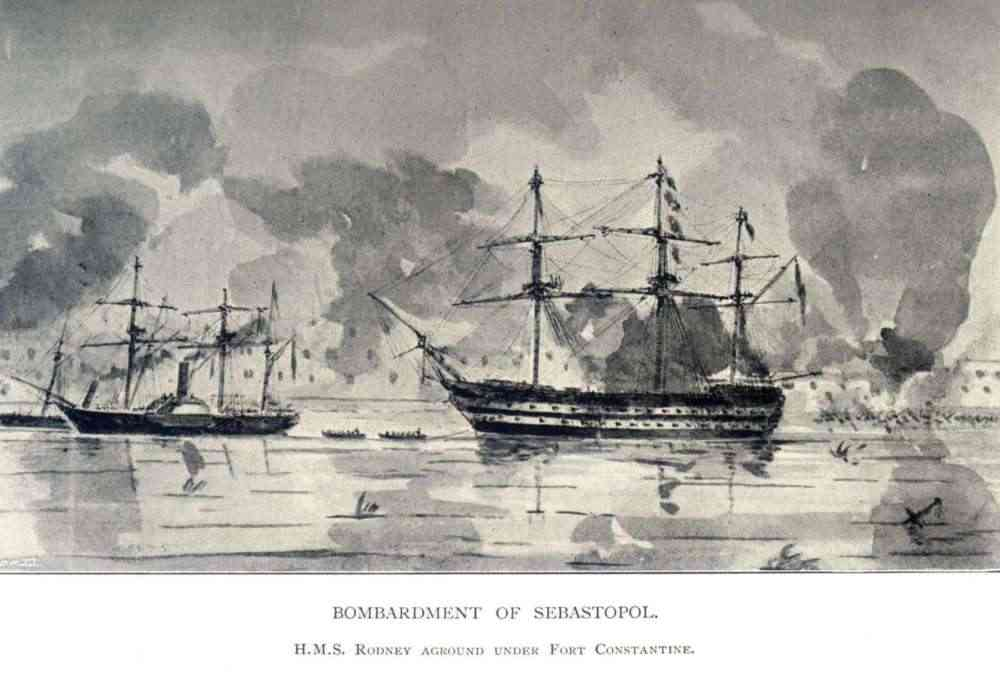
The bombardment of Sevastopol at which Symonds was present

Symonds was born in 1811 in Milford-on-Sea, Hampshire, the second son of Rear Admiral Sir William Symonds and Elizabeth Saunders Symonds (née Luscombe). He was baptised along with his younger brothers Julian and Jermyn on 11 September 1816 in Fawley, Hampshire. His elder brother William Cornwallis Symonds (1810–1841) became an army captain.

== Early career ==
Symonds joined the Royal Navy on 25 April 1825. After passing his examinations, he was promoted to lieutenant on 5 November 1832. He was appointed to the sixth-rate HMS Vestal at Portsmouth in April 1833 and then transferred to the fourth-rate HMS Endymion in the Mediterranean Fleet in September 1833. He transferred again to the first-rate HMS Britannia in July 1834 and to the sixth-rate HMS Rattlesnake on the East Indies Station in December 1834.

Symonds was promoted to commander on 21 October 1837, just before returning home, and then became commanding officer of the sloop HMS Rover on the North America and West Indies Station in August 1838. He was promoted to captain on 22 February 1841, benefiting from his father's Whig friends in the Admiralty repaying favours for services they had received from his father in the past. He became commanding officer of the sixth-rate HMS Spartan in the Mediterranean Fleet in May 1846 and then commanding officer of the fourth-rate HMS Arethusa, which he commissioned and then delivered to the Mediterranean Fleet, in January 1850.

Symonds was deployed to the Black Sea in HMS Arethusa in 1854, early of the Crimean War, and participated in the bombardment of Sevastopol in October 1854. He was appointed a Companion of the Order of the Bath on 5 July 1855 and was awarded the Order of the Medjidie, third class on 3 April 1858. He went on to be commanding officer of the first-rate HMS Conqueror, in the Channel Squadron, in November 1855.

== Senior command ==
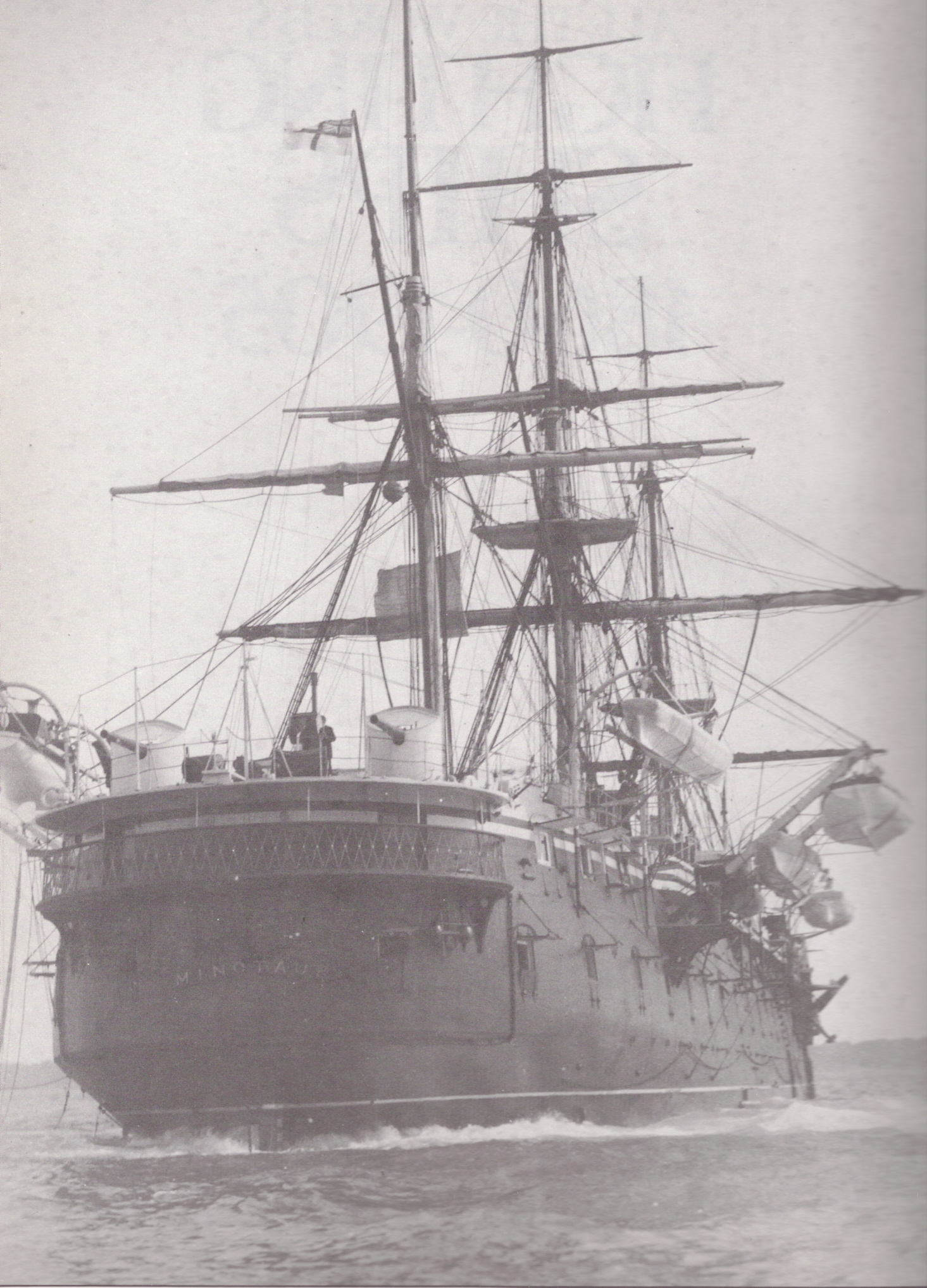
A stern view of the armoured frigate HMS Minotaur, Symonds' flagship as Commander-in-Chief, Channel Squadron

The scalene triangle, advocated by Symonds as an appropriate naval formation for a squadron of ships

Promoted to rear-admiral on 1 November 1860, Symonds became Admiral Superintendent at Devonport Dockyard, with his flag in the second-rate HMS Indus, in December 1862. Promoted to vice-admiral on 2 April 1866, he went on to be Commander-in-Chief, Channel Squadron, with his flag in the armoured frigate HMS Minotaur, in December 1868. In that role he invented the scalene triangle naval formation, replacing the older isosceles triangle naval formation, and earned himself a reputation as a tactician. He was advanced to Knight Commander of the Order of the Bath on 13 March 1867.

In 1870 Symonds carried out an investigation into the design of the turret ships HMS Monarch and HMS Captain and concluded that the turret ships were "formidable" and would, by superior armament, destroy any opposing broadside ships. HMS Captain capsized in September 1870 with the loss of nearly 500 lives because of design and construction errors that led to inadequate stability.

Promoted to full admiral on 14 July 1871, Symonds became Commander-in-Chief, Plymouth, with his flag in the first-rate HMS Royal Adelaide, in November 1875 and was then promoted to Admiral of the Fleet on 15 June 1879 and advanced to Knight Grand Cross of the Order of the Bath on 23 April 1880.

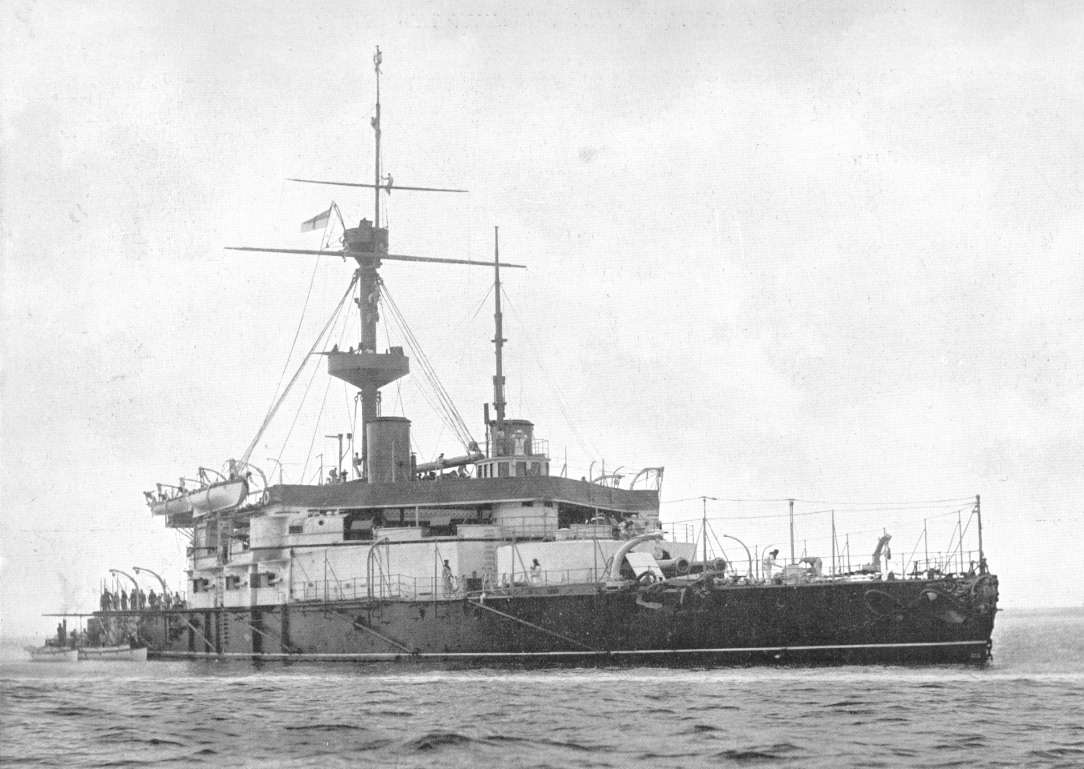
Symonds criticised the design of the battleship HMS Trafalgar, which he said sat far too low in the water.

Symonds retired in July 1883: he led an active retirement, writing letters and pamphlets to The Times arguing in favour of changes to ship design and a stronger navy. On 20 October 1890, he wrote an open letter to the British press regarding the naval armour tests by the United States Navy at Annapolis. His point was that the tests showed that the compound-armour used in the design of the British Trafalgar-class battleships, HMS Trafalgar and HMS Nile was defective. He also argued that these battleships had "untrustworthy monster guns" fitted on "enormously heavy turrets" and consequently sat far too low in the water.

In 1892, Symonds issued a nine-column, eleven-point statement as a Christmas supplement to all the service papers entitled "The Truly Perilous State of Great Britain Should War Occur between France and Ourselves". He died at his home, Sunny Hill at Higher Warberry in Torquay, on 14 November 1894.

== Family ==
In September 1845 Symonds married Anna Maria, daughter of Captain Edmund Heywood RN. Following the death of his first wife in June 1847, he married Prestwood Mary, daughter of Captain Thomas Wolrige RN, in February 1856.

== See also ==
- O'Byrne, William Richard (1849). "Symonds, Thomas Matthew Charles" . A Naval Biographical Dictionary . John Murray – via Wikisource.

== Sources ==
- Macintyre, Donald; Bathe, Basil W (1974). Man of War: A History of the Combat Vessel. New York: McGraw-Hill. ISBN 9780070445857.
- Heathcote, Tony (2002). The British Admirals of the Fleet 1734 – 1995. Havertown: Pen & Sword. ISBN 0-85052-835-6.

Military offices
Preceded by Frederick Warden	Commander-in-Chief, Channel Fleet; 1868–1870	Succeeded by Sir Hastings Yelverton
Preceded by Sir Henry Keppel	Commander-in-Chief, Plymouth; 1875–1878	Succeeded by Sir Arthur Farquhar
