= St Matthew's Church, Dunedin =

Church building in Dunedin, New Zealand

St Matthew's Church
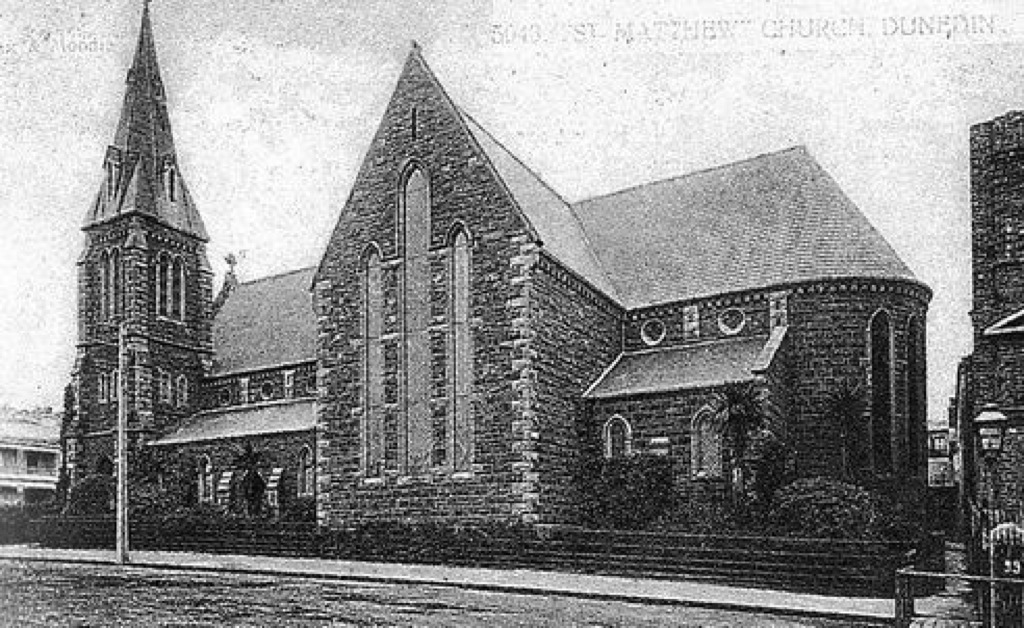
- St Matthew's Church from a late 19th-century postcard
- St Matthew's Church
- 45°52′48″S 170°29′53″E
- Address: 28 Hope Street, City Rise, Dunedin, Otago
- Country: New Zealand
- Denomination: Anglican
- Website: www.stmatthews.co.nz

History
- Status: Church
- Founded: 11 July 1873
- Dedication: Matthew the Apostle
- Consecrated: 3 December 1874

Architecture
- Functional status: Active
- Architect: William Mason
- Architectural type: Church
- Style: Gothic Revival
- Construction cost: NZ£4,874

Specifications
- Capacity: 750 people
- Materials: Bluestone

Administration
- Diocese: Dunedin
- Parish: St Matthew's

Clergy
- Vicar: vacant

Heritage New Zealand – Category 1
- Designated: 7 July 1988
- Reference no.: 2212

St Matthew's Church is an Anglican church located on the City Rise in Dunedin, New Zealand. Designed by William Mason, the foundation stone was laid on 11 July 1873 and the building was consecrated on 3 December 1874. It cost NZ£4,874 to construct which wasn't paid off until 1901. It comfortably seated 750 people.

== Overview ==
A Gothic Revival building, somewhere between the Norman and the Early English style, it is built of bluestone with Port Chalmers breccia for the quoins and facings which is unusual. Very English in its feeling it represents a return to the plain manner of the architect's early career. It is cruciform in plan, with an apsidal chancel where there are five lancet stained glass windows. There are aisles divided from the nave by massive, octagonal piers, a tower and a spire at the south west corner above the principal entrance. There is another entrance at the north west angle. Some in the Diocese wanted the building to become the cathedral church, but the congregation was unwilling. St. Paul's in the Octagon was designated instead.

The church has been fairly closely built around since its construction but retains an attractive appearance. Its internal layout was reversed in the late 20th century but has since been returned to its original orientation. The original pews have been lost but the interior is otherwise little modified.

In 1942 the artist Colin McCahon married Anne Hamblett in St Matthew's, the ceremony being performed by her father, the Reverend Hamblett, then the incumbent clergyman.

The church has a Category I listing with the New Zealand Historic Places Trust.
