= Frederick Richard West =

British politician

Member of Parliament for Denbigh Boroughs
- In office 1847–1857
- Preceded by: Townshend Mainwaring
- Succeeded by: Townshend Mainwaring
- In office 1826–1830
- Preceded by: John Wynne Griffith
- Succeeded by: Robert Myddelton Biddulph

Member of Parliament for East Grinstead
- In office 1830–1832 Serving with William Amherst, 2nd Earl Amherst
- Preceded by: Charles Gordon, 10th Marquess of Huntly; William Amherst, 2nd Earl Amherst
- Succeeded by: Constituency abolished

Personal details
- Born: 6 February 1799 London, England
- Died: 1 May 1862 (aged 63)
- Spouse(s): Lady Georgiana Stanhope (m. 1820; died 1824) Theresa Cornwallis Whitby (m. 1827)
- Children: 6, including William
- Parent(s): Hon. Frederick West; Maria Myddleton

Frederick Richard West (6 February 1799 – 1 May 1862) was a British Tory MP for Denbigh Boroughs and East Grinstead. He was a member of the Canterbury Association.

== Early life ==
West was born in 1799 in Hanover Square, London. He was the third son of the Hon. Frederick West (1767–1852) and Maria Myddleton. He attended Eton and Christ Church, Oxford, from where he left in 1818 without a degree.

== Political career ==
West was an MP for Denbigh Boroughs from 1826 to 1830, for East Grinstead from 1830 to 1832, and again Denbigh Boroughs again from 1847 to 1857. He was a member of the Canterbury Association from 7 May 1850.

== Family ==
His first marriage was on 14 November 1820 to Lady Georgiana Stanhope. Her parents were Philip Stanhope, 5th Earl of Chesterfield (1755–1815) and Henrietta, the third daughter of Thomas Thynne, 1st Marquess of Bath of Longleat House. She died on 14 August 1824, aged 22, without issue. His second marriage was on 11 September 1827 to Theresa Cornwallis Whitby, the only daughter of Captain John Whitby RN, and Mary Anna Theresa Symonds, had children:

- a son (September 1828 – December 1828)
- Frederick Myddelton West (31 August 1830 – 13 August 1868) unmarried.
- Georgiana Theresa Ella West (28 December 1831 – 8 February 1915), married in 1875, as his second wife, to Warren Peacocke (1822–1877), son of Vice-Admiral Richard Peacocke. No issue.
- Florence West (2 November 1833 – 1 June 1906) unmarried.
- William Cornwallis-West (20 March 1835 – 4 July 1917), who later became an MP for West Denbighshire. In 1872, he married Patsy Fitzpatrick, by whom he had three children. George married Lady Randolph Churchill. Daisy married the Prince of Pless. Shelagh married the 2nd Duke of Westminster.
- Theresa Lucy Sophia Elphinstone West (9 August 1839 – 4 October 1920) unmarried.

Parliament of the United Kingdom
Preceded by John Wynne Griffith	Member of Parliament for Denbigh Boroughs; 1826–1830	Succeeded by Robert Myddelton Biddulph
Preceded by Townshend Mainwaring	Member of Parliament for Denbigh Boroughs; 1847–1857	Succeeded by Townshend Mainwaring
Preceded by Lord Strathavon; Viscount Holmesdale	Member of Parliament for East Grinstead; 1830–1832; With: Viscount Holmesdale 1830–1832	Constituency abolished
