= The New Zealand Herald =

Daily newspaper

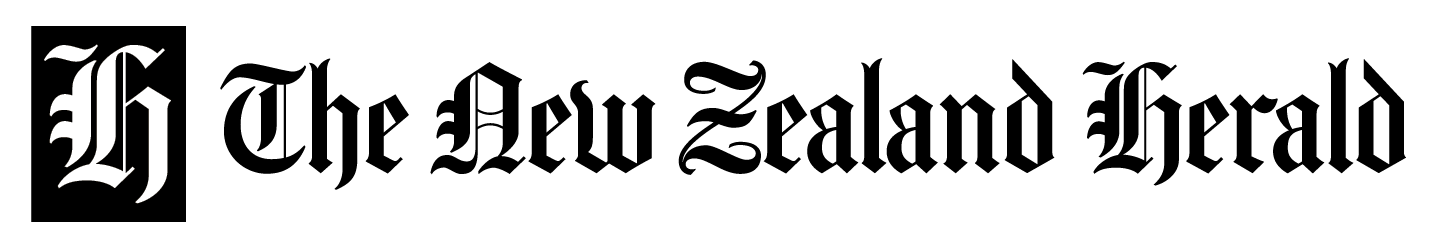

- Front page, 5 April 2024
- Type: Daily newspaper
- Format: Compact (weekdays and Sundays); Broadsheet (Saturdays)
- Owner: NZME
- Editor-in-chief: Murray Kirkness
- Editor: Murray Kirkness (weekday)
- Founded: 1863; 163 years ago (by William Chisholm Wilson)
- Headquarters: Auckland
- Country: New Zealand
- Circulation: 100,073 (as of 30 September 2019)
- ISSN: 1170-0777
- OCLC number: 11123090
- Website: nzherald.co.nz

The New Zealand Herald is a daily newspaper published in Auckland, New Zealand, since 1863. It is considered a newspaper of record for New Zealand. It has been owned by New Zealand Media and Entertainment since that company formed in 2014.

It has the largest newspaper circulation in New Zealand, peaking at over 200,000 copies in 2006, although circulation of the daily Herald had declined to 100,073 copies on average by September 2019.

The Herald's publications include: a daily paper; the Weekend Herald, a weekly Saturday paper; and the Herald on Sunday. Its main circulation area is the Auckland region. It is also delivered to much of the rest of the North Island, including Northland, Waikato, King Country, Hawke's Bay, Bay of Plenty, Manawatū-Whanganui, and Wellington.

== History ==
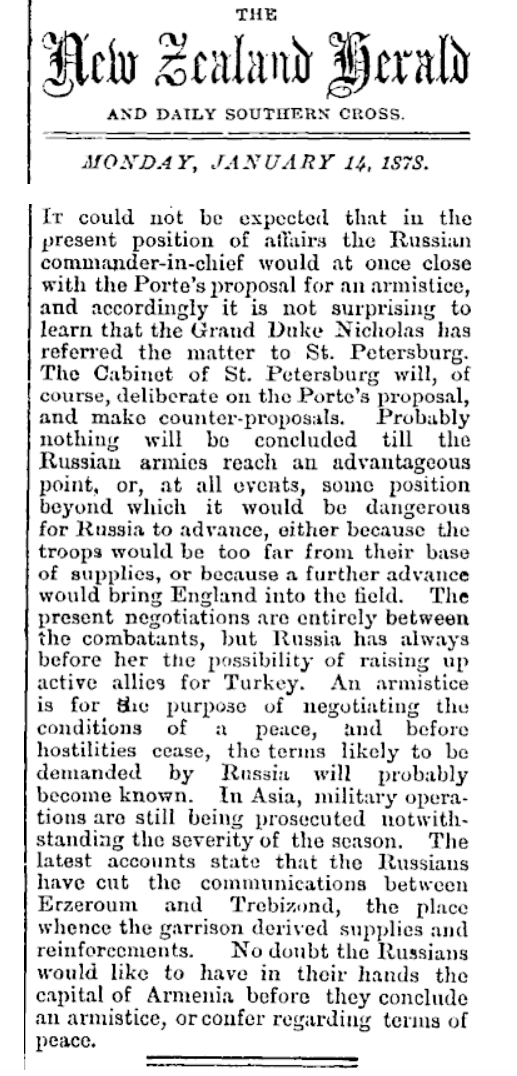
New Zealand Herald and Daily Southern Cross excerpt regarding the Russo-Turkish War (1877–1878), 14 January 1878

The New Zealand Herald was founded by William Chisholm Wilson (1810–1876), and first published on 13 November 1863. Wilson had been a partner with John Williamson in The New-Zealander, but left to start a rival daily newspaper as he saw a business opportunity with Auckland's rapidly growing population. He had also split with Williamson because Wilson supported the war against the Māori (which the Herald termed "the native rebellion") while Williamson opposed it. The Herald also promoted a more constructive relationship between the North and South Islands.

After The New Zealander closed in 1866, The Daily Southern Cross provided competition, particularly after Julius Vogel took a majority shareholding in 1868. First published as The Southern Cross (without daily in its title) in 1843 by William Brown, it became a daily publication in 1862, with its name modified to The Daily Southern Cross. Vogel sold out of the paper in 1873 and Alfred Horton bought it in 1876.

In 1876 the Wilson family and Horton joined in partnership and The New Zealand Herald absorbed The Daily Southern Cross.

In 1879 the United Press Association was formed so that the main daily papers could share news stories. The organisation became the New Zealand Press Association (NZPA) in 1942. In 1892, the New Zealand Herald, Otago Daily Times, and Press agreed to share the costs of a London correspondent and advertising salesman. The NZPA closed in 2011.

The Wilson and Horton families were both represented in the company, known as Wilson & Horton, until 1996 when Tony O'Reilly's Independent News & Media Group of Dublin purchased the Horton family's interest in the company. At some point, the company was purchased by APN NZ, a New Zealand subsidiary of APN News & Media. In April 2007, APN NZ announced it was outsourcing the bulk of the Herald's copy editing to an Australian-owned company, Pagemasters. The Herald is now owned by New Zealand Media and Entertainment, formed in 2014. That company was owned by Sydney-based APN News & Media and the Radio Network, formerly owned by the Australian Radio Network.

In November 2012, two months after the launch of its new compact format, APN News and Media announced it would be restructuring its workforce, cutting eight senior roles from across the Herald's range of titles.

=== Notable contributors ===
- Dita de Boni was a columnist for the newspaper, writing her first columns for the NZ Herald in 1995. From 2012 to 2015 she wrote a business and politics column until – after a series of articles increasingly critical of the Key government – the Herald discontinued her column for financial reasons.
- Gordon Minhinnick was a staff cartoonist from the 1930s until his retirement in the 1980s.
- Malcolm Evans was dismissed from his position as staff cartoonist in 2003 after the newspaper received complaints about his cartoons on the Israeli–Palestinian conflict.
- Laurence Clark was the daily political cartoonist from 1987 to 1996 and continued to publish cartoons weekly in the Herald until 2000.
- William Berry, editor of the New Zealand Herald in 1875 and the Daily Southern Cross in 1877
- William Lane, Leader writer from 1900 then appointed editor in 1913.

=== Format ===
On 10 September 2012, the Herald moved to a compact format for weekday editions, after 150 years publishing in broadsheet format. The broadsheet format was retained for the Weekend Herald.

== Political stance and editorial opinion ==
The Herald is traditionally a centre-right newspaper and was given the nickname "Granny Herald" into the 1990s.

== Brands ==
=== The Weekend Herald ===
In 1998 the Weekend Herald was set up as a separate title and the newspaper's website was launched.

=== Herald on Sunday ===
A compact-sized Sunday edition, the Herald on Sunday, was first published on 3 October 2004 under the editorship of Suzanne Chetwin and then, for five years, by Shayne Currie. It won Newspaper of the Year for the calendar years 2007 and 2009 and is New Zealand's most-read Sunday newspaper. In 2010, the Herald on Sunday started a campaign to reduce the legal blood alcohol limit for driving in New Zealand, called the "Two Drinks Max" campaign. The paper set up a campaign Facebook page, a Twitter account, and encouraged readers to sign up to the campaign on its own website. It is currently edited by Alanah Eriksen.

=== Herald Online website ===
The newspaper's online news service, originally called Herald Online, was established in 1998. It was redesigned in late 2006, and again in 2012. The site was named best news website at the 2007 and 2008 Qantas Media Awards, won the "best re-designed website" category at the 2007 New Zealand NetGuide Awards, and was one of seven newspaper sites named an Official Honouree in the 2007 Webby Awards. A paywall was added for "premium content" starting on 29 April 2019.

== Editors ==
- Managing editor: Murray Kirkness
- Weekends editor: Stuart Dye

== Regular columnists ==
- Deborah Coddington, Herald on Sunday
- Matt McCarten, Herald on Sunday
- Brian Rudman
- Colin James is a past columnist

== Arms ==
Coat of arms of The New Zealand Herald
Notes The arms of the newspaper, The New Zealand Herald, consist of: Crest On a wreath of the colours two Trumpets in saltire Or bound together by a Māori Tāniko in the shape of the letter H proper. Escutcheon Per chevron Azure and Gules in chief on a Pale Or between a representation of the Constellation of the Southern Cross and a Lymphad sails furled oars in action Argent a Sword point upwards Gules in base a Caduceus Or.

== Issues and controversies ==
=== Mistaken identity incident ===
In July 2014, the Herald published a front-page story about the death of Guy Boyland, a New Zealand-born soldier killed in Gaza. The paper pulled a photograph of the television star Ryan Dunn, killed in 2011, from Boyland's Facebook page, erroneously claiming it was of Boyland. When the Herald's mistake was revealed, the paper issued apologies to Boyland's family, his friends, and the paper's readers. In a 2016 study by Philippa K. Smith and Helen Sissons, the authors said the mistake was caused by "a series of lapses in the newsroom". They concluded that the incident caused damage to the Herald's reputation, which it tried to repair by apologising. The Herald promised to reform its newsroom processes.

=== Ethics incident ===
In July 2015, the New Zealand Press Council ruled that Herald columnist Rachel Glucina had failed to properly represent herself as a journalist when seeking comment from Amanda Bailey on a complaint she had made about Prime Minister John Key repeatedly pulling her hair when he was a customer at the cafe in which she worked. The Herald published Bailey's name, photo, and comments after she had retracted permission for Glucina to do so. The council said there was an "element of subterfuge" in Glucina's actions and that there was not enough public interest to justify her behaviour. In its ruling the council said that "The NZ Herald has fallen sadly short of those standards in this case." The Herald's editor denied the accusations of subterfuge. Glucina subsequently resigned from the newspaper.

=== COVID-19 disinformation ===
In 2020, the New Zealand Herald ran inserts provided by the People's Daily, the official mouthpiece of the Central Committee of the Chinese Communist Party, pushing Chinese state disinformation about COVID-19. The newspaper subsequently deleted the story from its website.

=== 2024 Hobson's Pledge advertisement ===
On 7 August 2024, lobby group Hobson's Pledge published a full-page advertisement in The New Zealand Herald calling for the "restoration of the foreshore and seabed to public ownership." The advertisement drew criticism from Te Pāti Māori, who responded they would be cease engaging with The Herald until the newspaper and its owners NZME issued a public apology and amended their publishing standards.
