= John Wynne Griffith =

John Wynne Griffith of Garn (1 April 1763 – 20 June 1834) was a Welsh Whig politician who served as the Member of Parliament (MP) for Denbigh Boroughs from 1818 to 1826. He was elected unopposed at the 1818 general election, re-elected in 1820 with 60 of the 110 votes cast, and did not stand again in 1826.

He was also known as a lichenologist.

== Notes ==
Parliament of the United Kingdom
Preceded by Viscount Kirkwall	Member of Parliament for Denbigh Boroughs; 1818 – 1826	Succeeded by Frederick Richard West
