= The New-Zealander =

Defunct New Zealand newspaper (1845–1866)

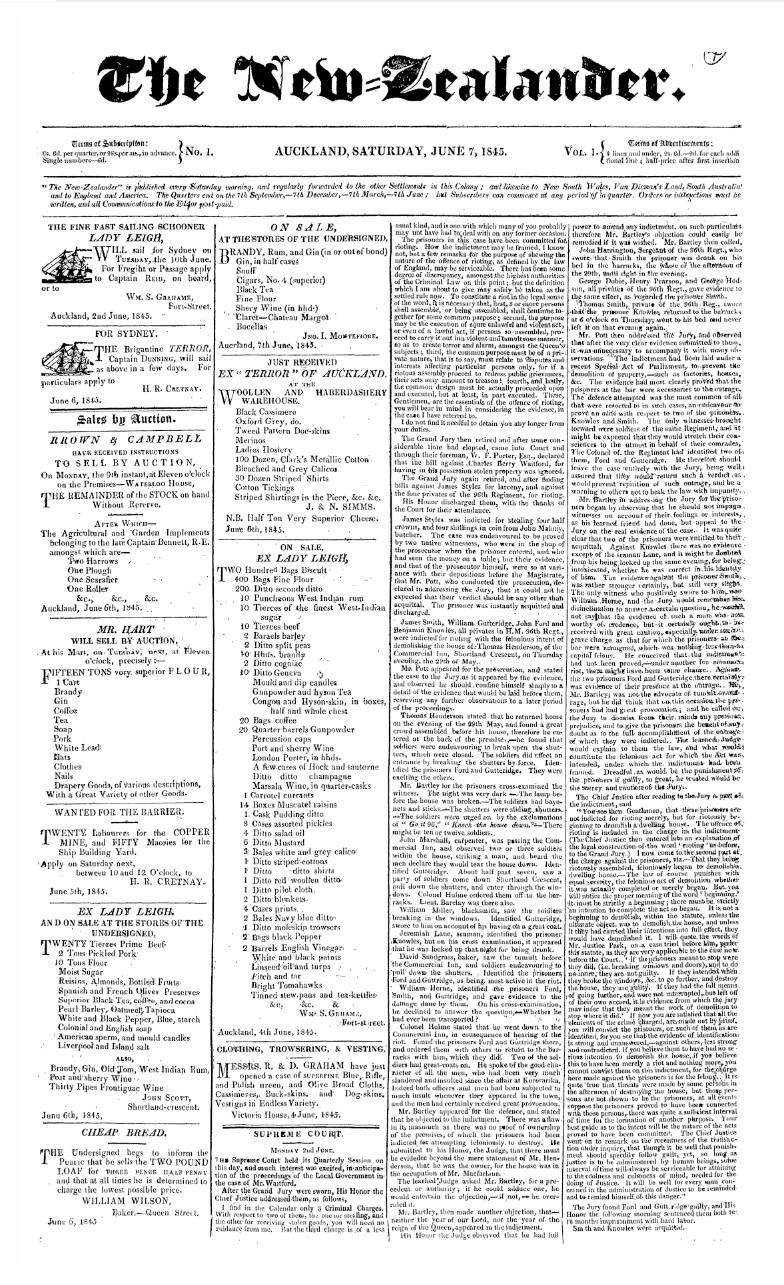
- Cover page of issue 1
- Type: Daily Newspaper
- Founded: 1845
- Ceased publication: 1866
- Headquarters: Auckland, New Zealand

The New-Zealander was a newspaper in Auckland, New Zealand, from 1845 to 1866. Founded by John Williamson, it was one of two dominant newspapers in Auckland and by 1859, it was the country's leading newspaper. Williamson took William Chisholm Wilson into partnership. The two parted ways over a disagreement on the newspaper's pro-Māori stance, with Wilson setting up The New Zealand Herald. From 1863, The New-Zealander was a daily, but lost readership over its support for the indigenous people and had to go to bi-weekly publication. After a fire in May 1866, the newspaper ceased.

== History ==
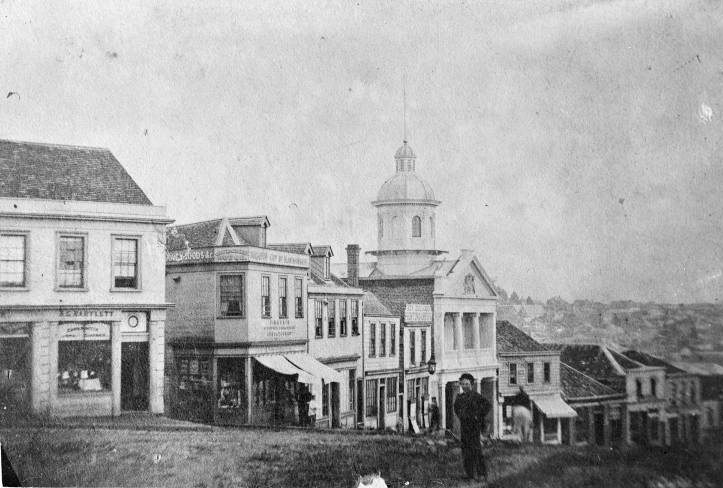
Office of The New-Zealander (third building from left) in Upper Shortland Street in 1864

John Williamson started The New-Zealander as a weekly newspaper. The first edition was published on 7 June 1845. It was the main competitor of The Southern Cross. These were the only two newspapers that became established in Auckland for any significant period of time before the 1860s.

The New-Zealander began during the depression following the Flagstaff War against Hōne Heke in the Bay of Islands. The paper aimed to represent the interests of the average settler and Māori. It was the view of The New-Zealander that the interests of the larger land claimant groups were already receiving more than enough coverage in the Auckland Times. Ironically the Times closed shortly after The New-Zealander began publishing in June 1845.

The Southern Cross was temporarily suspended in 1845 leaving The New-Zealander to continue without competition until The Southern Cross was revived in 1847. The New-Zealander responded to this by publishing bi-weekly. In 1848 Williamson took William Chisholm Wilson into partnership.

The paper steadily increased its influence. By 1859 it was the leading paper in New Zealand and in 1863 it became a daily. Also in that year the partnership split over the New Zealand Wars. Williamson was against it while Wilson was for it. Wilson left to set up The New Zealand Herald and Williamson carried on as the sole owner.

The New-Zealander incurred some criticism for its comments on the war. In June 1864 fifty men from the HMS Esk threatened to pull down the newspaper office after one of the paper's correspondents suggested that Captain Hamilton's death at Gate Pā was due to his men having deserted. Williamson refused to apologise but did offer to print a rebuttal from the seamen in his paper.

By this time The New-Zealander had begun to lose influence and support. The paper's pro-Māori policy was moderated but it was too late. In 1865 it couldn't sustain daily publication and had to revert to bi-weekly. In the evening of 8 May 1866, the office in Shortland Street burnt down and the paper stopped; the last paper prior to the fire had been published on Saturday, 5 May. An inquest was held and the jury determined that the fire started in the compositing room, but they were unable to determine whether the fire was accidental or had been deliberately lit. The Auckland Provincial Council purchased the building after the fire. It was later used as a boarding house.

Proprietors of The New-Zealander
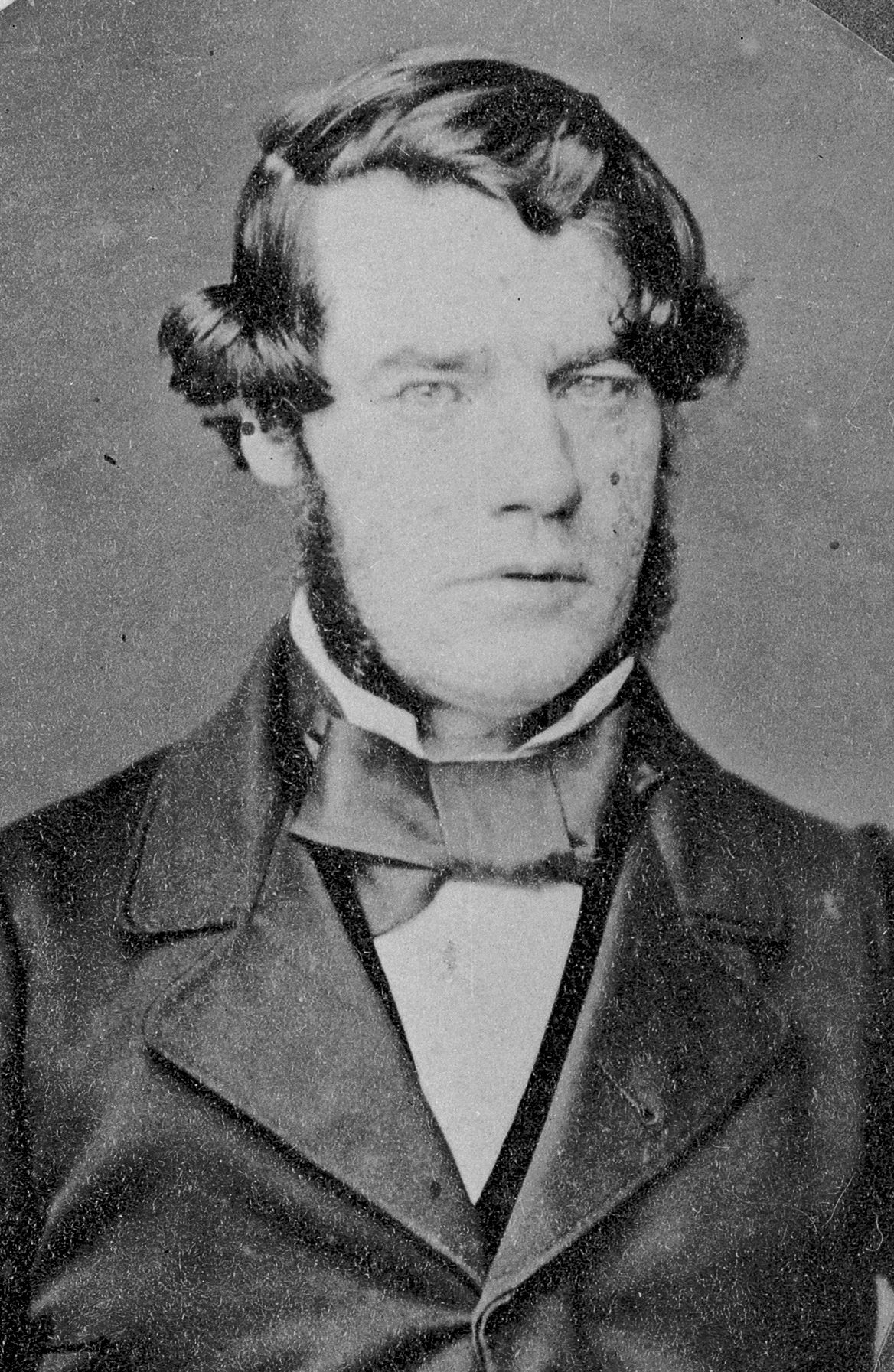
Williamson (1860)

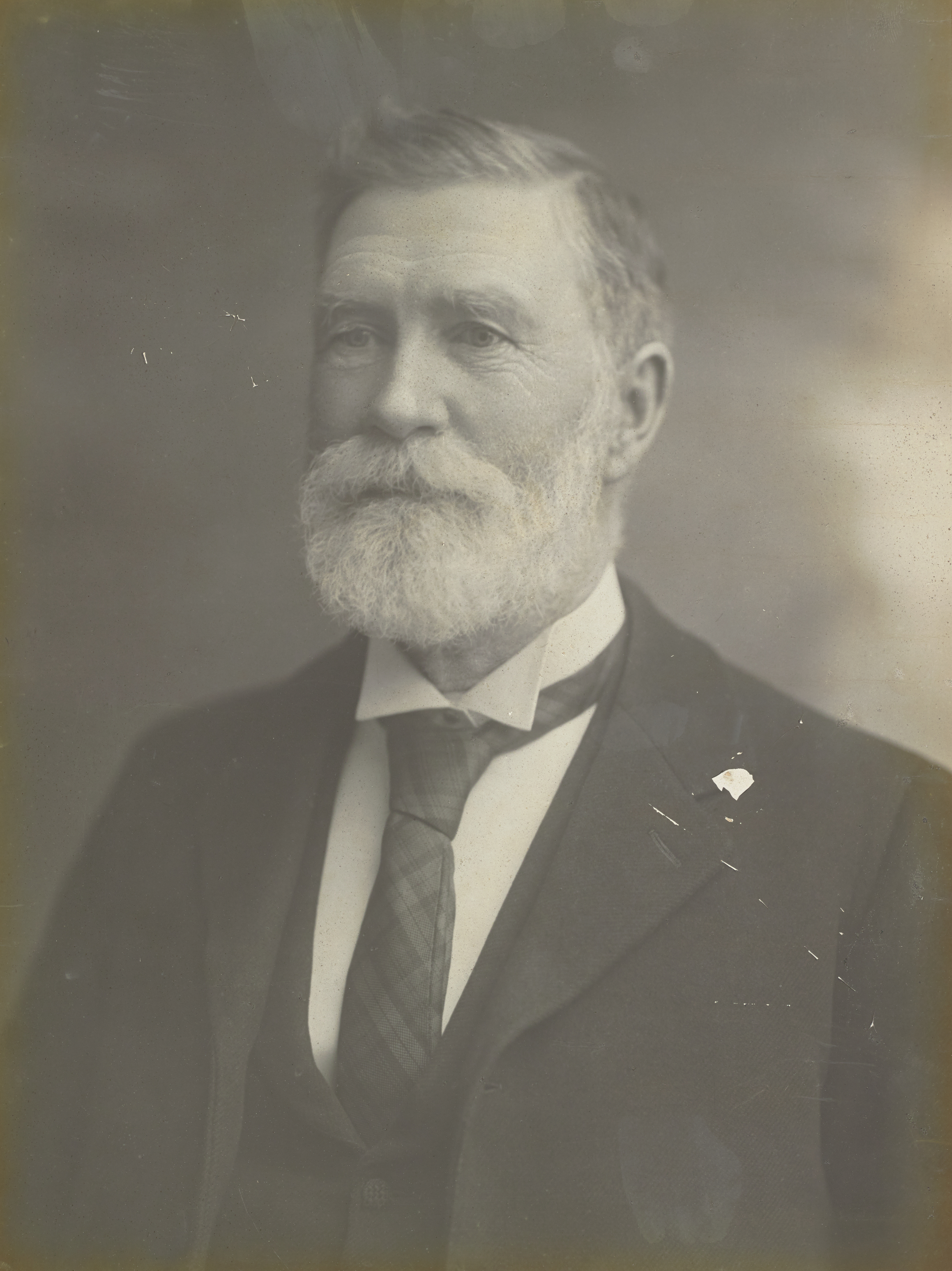
Wilson (year unknown)

== Assessment ==
The New-Zealander and The Southern Cross are good examples of the way the country's press was politically aligned at the time and this was mirrored in other centres around New Zealand.
