= John Williamson (New Zealand politician) =

New Zealand politician, printer and newspaper proprietor (1815–1875)

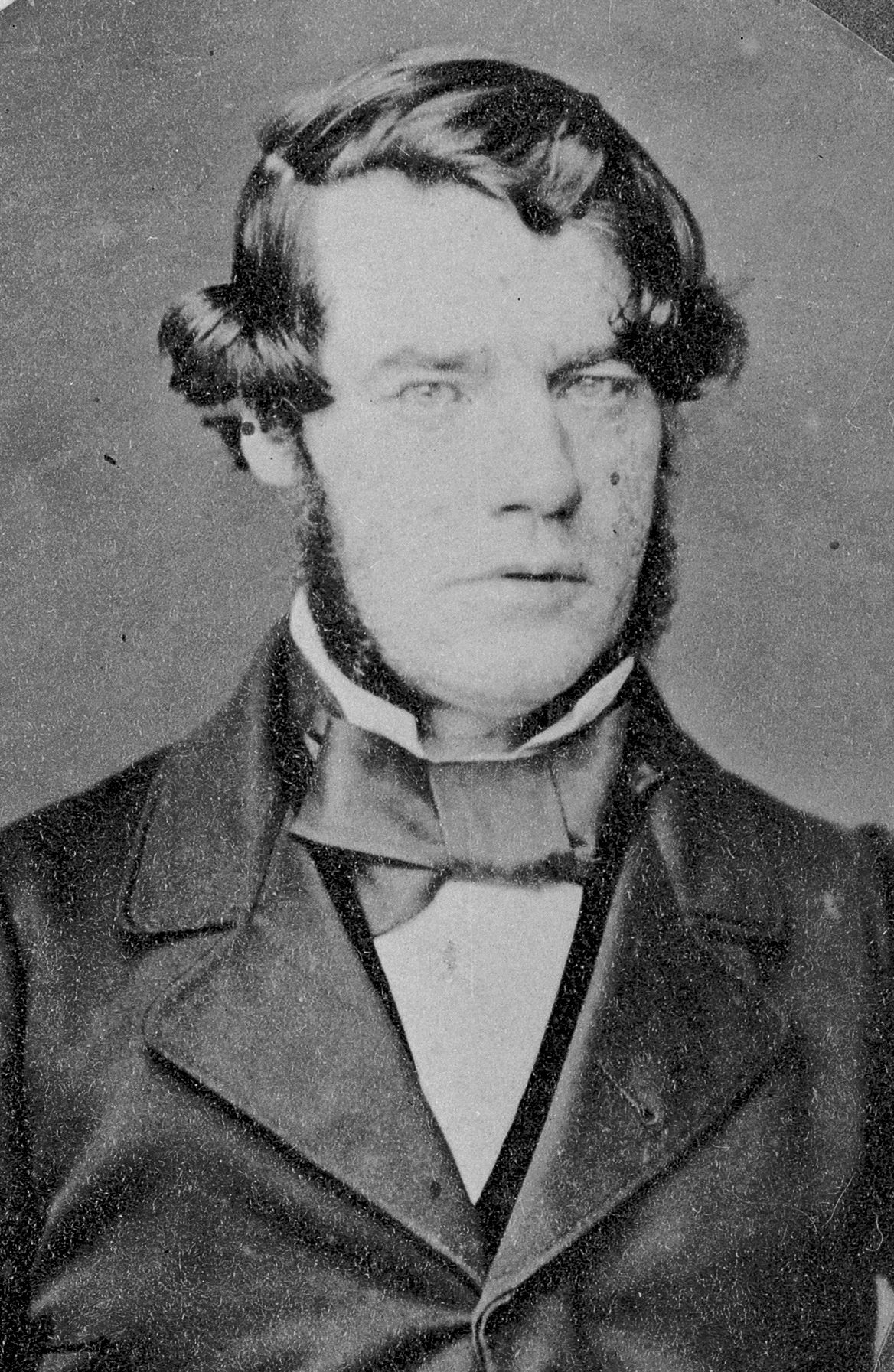
- John Williamson, 1860
- Born: 25 August 1815; Newry, County Down, Ireland
- Died: 16 February 1875 (aged 59); Auckland, New Zealand
- Occupations: Newspaper proprietor Politician

John Williamson (25 August 1815 – 16 February 1875) was a New Zealand politician, printer and newspaper proprietor. He was a leading opponent of the 1860s wars against Māori and lost his newspaper and fortune as a result.

== Early life ==
Williamson was probably born on 25 August 1815, or possibly February 1815, in Newry, County Down, Ireland.

== Career ==
He served his apprenticeship as a printer. He married Sarah Barre in either 1833 or 1834, and they were to have five children.

=== New South Wales ===
The family emigrated to Sydney, New South Wales, in 1840, where Williamson worked for the Australasian Chronicle and then the Sydney Monitor. He moved on to Auckland, New Zealand, in mid-1841.

=== New Zealand ===
He purchased his own printing press in 1845 and started The New-Zealander, which became Auckland's leading newspaper. The editorial approach of The New-Zealander, was to support the ordinary settler and the Māori.

He was joined by partner William Chisholm Wilson in 1848, until Wilson left to found the New Zealand Herald in 1863. The New-Zealander ceased after a fire on 8 May 1866. A coroner's hearing concluded there was insufficient information to determine the cause, though evidence was given of an unknown person running away. In 1867 the Evening Post wrote, "It was a combination of leading men in Auckland—notably the business men—that killed the New Zealander, causing heavy loss to its actual proprietor and those conducting it. Why? It ventured to have an opinion, and to maintain it."

New Zealand Parliament
Years	Term	Electorate	Party
1855–1860	2nd	Pensioner Settlements	Independent
1861–1866	3rd	City of Auckland West	Independent
1866–1870	4th	City of Auckland West	Independent
1871	5th	City of Auckland West	Independent
1871–1875	5th	City of Auckland West	Independent

He was a member of the Auckland Provincial Council in the first council from 22 July 1853, representing the Pensioner Settlements electorate. He served until 15 November 1856 as a councillor. He was, over three periods, the fourth Superintendent of Auckland Province (1856–1862 resigned; 1867–1869 defeated; 1873–1875 died). On 28 December 1865, he became a member of the Auckland Executive Council as commissioner of waste lands under Frederick Whitaker as Superintendent, until he succeeded him in 1867 following his resignation.

Williamson represented the Pensioner Settlements (consisting of the Auckland suburbs of Howick, Onehunga, Ōtāhuhu, and Panmure) in the 2nd New Zealand Parliament from 1855 to 1860, and represented the City of Auckland West electorate in the 3rd Parliament, the 4th Parliament, and the 5th Parliament from 1861 to 1875 (in 1871 the election was declared void, but he was then re-elected).

He was briefly a minister without portfolio in the second Fox Ministry in July/August 1861. He died in 1875, while he was a Member of Parliament. He was buried in Symonds Street Cemetery.

== Notes ==
New Zealand Parliament
Preceded by John Bacot	Member of Parliament for Pensioner Settlements; 1855–1860; Served alongside: Joseph Greenwood, John Jermyn Symonds	Succeeded by William Mason
Political offices
Preceded by John Logan Campbell	Superintendent of Auckland Province; 1856–62; 1867–69; 1873–75	Succeeded by Robert Graham
Preceded by Frederick Whitaker	Superintendent of Auckland Province; 1856–62; 1867–69; 1873–75	Succeeded by Thomas Gillies
Preceded by Thomas Gillies	Superintendent of Auckland Province; 1856–62; 1867–69; 1873–75	Succeeded by Maurice O'Rorke
