= William Mason (architect) =

New Zealand architect (1810–1897)

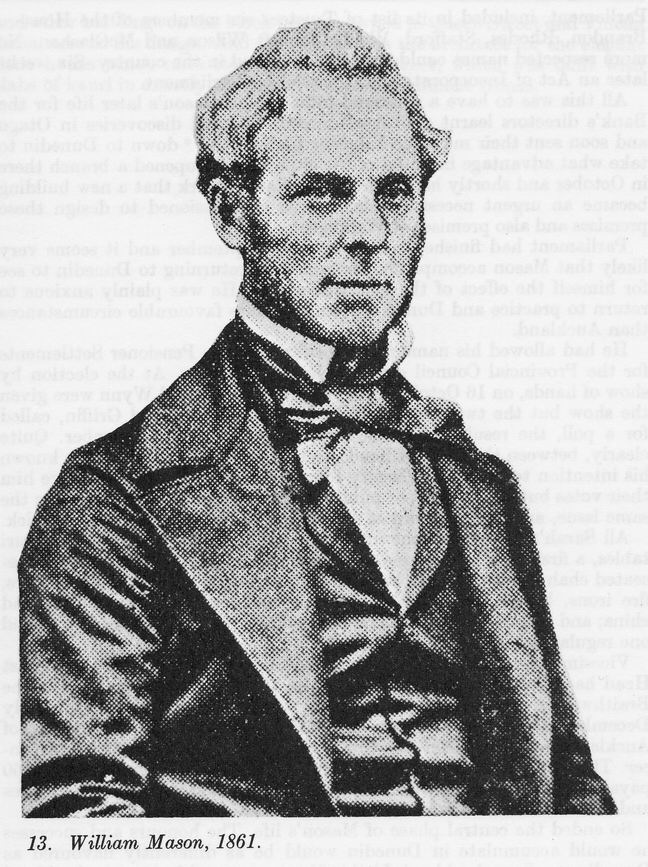
William Mason in 1861.

William Mason (24 February 1810 – 22 June 1897) was a New Zealand architect born in Ipswich, England, the son of an architect/builder George Mason and Susan, née Forty. Trained by his father he went to London where he worked for Thomas Telford (1757–1834). He studied under Peter Nicholson (1765–1844) before eventually working for Edward Blore (1787–1879).

== Early life ==
In 1831 he married Sarah Nichols, a Berkshire woman apparently fifteen years older than he was. A son was born in the first year of their marriage. In 1836 he returned to Ipswich to practise. Having worked at Lambeth Palace he had attracted the interest of the bishop of London, who now employed him independently designing churches and parsonages. These included three commissions for churches in Essex: St Lawrence, East Donyland; St Botolph, Colchester; and St James, Brightlingsea. The most remarkable of these is St Botolph's (1838) in white brick and Norman style. Apparently Georgian in plan and in its interior it strikes a medieval note outside. St James (1836), also white brick and in the lancet style and resembling some of Blore's work, is very like St Paul's Church, Auckland which Mason built a few years later. Perhaps because of economic hardship, perhaps because of ambition in 1838 the Masons emigrated to New South Wales.

In Sydney Mason worked for the Colonial Architect Mortimer Lewis. He had a success in winning first and second prizes for a new Mechanics' Institute, submitting Gothic and Classical designs, a sign of the rising competition between these styles. He built wheat silos on Cockatoo Island, a task requiring engineering ingenuity. It seems that here he acquired his acquaintance with verandas. A new Government House was then under construction which had been designed by Edward Blore while Mason had still been on his staff in 1835. He may have worked on the drawings.

== To New Zealand ==
Perhaps ambition called again. He was offered an appointment as "Superintendent of Works" to the nascent government of William Hobson, Lieutenant Governor designate of New Zealand, which he accepted, sailing to join Hobson at the Bay of Islands where he arrived on 17 March 1840. He thus became the first professionally trained architect in New Zealand. His title was officially "Superintendent of Public Works" but he maintained he had been appointed "Colonial Architect". He adopted that title which was used by government officers in addressing him. He went to assist with establishing the new capital, Auckland, in September 1840. There he oversaw the erection of the prefabricated first Government House before resigning in 1841 due to complaints about the limited funding and materials for the construction of the new courthouse.{ After resigning he went into partnership with Thomas Paton. Formerly the government postmaster Paton had also resigned and the two men set up as auctioneers and architects. Mason designed the church of St Paul which was started in 1841. He had bought land and now built on it without making a fortune, put up premises for the New Zealand Banking Company and designed houses. He became involved in other commercial affairs but in 1841 his nine-year-old son was drowned in a well. The boy may have been murdered and his parents were deeply distressed.

By 1844 there was plenty of business but little architecture. Mason dissolved his partnership with Paton and took up farming in Epsom. He designed a windmill there and may have had some hand in the building of St John's College at Epsom, but these were architecturally unproductive years. He continued farming in various places around Auckland and entered public life. In 1851 he was elected to the Common Council of Auckland, but eventually a substantial commission turned up. Mason was living at Howick late in 1854 when he was appointed architect of the 10,000 pound project to build a new Government House. The result was a large, two-story, neo-classical building, whose manner may not have been entirely of Mason's choosing. It is made of timber treated to look like stone. Its principal facade has a central breakfront with round-headed windows in the upper floor. It has been the subject of rather mixed reviews since its completion in 1856 but it is a substantial house for New Zealand at the time and of its nature a significant building.

Mason was now Architect to the Auckland Provincial Council. In April 1856 he became President of the newly formed Board of Works. Amidst disputes about the new Government House he returned to his Howick Farm in February 1857. Early in 1860 he stepped back from this again moving into Howick village. As tension rose with Maori he became a captain in the Auckland militia.

New Zealand Parliament
Years	Term	Electorate	Party
1861–1866	3rd	Pensioner Settlements	Independent

In October 1861 he let his name go forward for election for the Pensioner Settlements, an Auckland seat, which he represented in parliament from 1861 to 1866, when he retired from parliament. At that time, the colonial parliament still met in Auckland. There he sat alongside Thomas Russell who soon established the Bank of New Zealand, with the benefit of a parliamentary Act. The bank had early information about the discovery of gold in Otago, which was then transforming the colony's prospects and was soon to change its demography. Mason was commissioned to design the bank's premises in Dunedin and Wellington which profoundly affected his later life. It seems that early in September he visited the southern settlement and made the decision to relocate there. At the same time an advertisement saw him selling his house and chattels in Auckland. The transfer document shows him as a "Gentleman", "late of Auckland but now of Dunedin".

== Early career in Dunedin ==
In the south the capital of the Presbyterian special settlement was mushrooming into a frontier city. Mason formed a partnership with David Ross (1827–1908) a Scottish-born Fellow of the Institute of British Architects who was already resident. There now followed numerous projects and a series of changing partnerships. The one with Ross was dissolved early in 1863. Of numerous small commissions the Dunedin Public Warehouse, for William Dalrymple, now 386 Princes Street, is a more substantial example. A three-story building in brick it has a vigorously modelled street front with emphatic quoining used to define the edges and apertures of the facade. Those around the windows rise to form round-topped columns. There are echoes here of the fenestration of the second Government House but the relative simplicity and strength of the Dunedin building shows the designer his own master again and possessed of a corresponding new confidence.

Mason also designed a number of houses at this time but his Bank of New Zealand, also on Princes Street, attracted particular attention. Described as of a "general Grecian Style" it was a stone built two-story structure on the site of William Armson's later, magnificent replacement. Again there were parallels with the second Government House but the bank, like the warehouse, and like the bank's counterpart in Wellington, also designed by Mason at this time, has been characterised as exhibiting an admirable "brawny simplicity" reminiscent of Robert Adam. Adjacent to the bank was a three-story office for T.B. Gillies which now saw Mason flourishing forth with a contrastingly exuberant and delicate Venetian design. It had paired, arcaded windows on the upper floors and sculpted heads over the columns. Sadly this building doesn't survive. Another substantial commission for the Bank of Australasia in High Street was a further contrast, a more obviously Victorian building whose elaborate ironwork reflected the connection between Dunedin and Melbourne at the time. It has been said it has been largely demolished but while remodelled still mostly survives, or did until its demolition in 2009. Mason had a number of staff at this busy time, including his clerk of works, Nathaniel Wales. By the end of 1863 he had bought land in London Street and there built a house for himself. Two-storey and Italianate it was another timber building treated to resemble stone, like the second Government House, but a tall structure, with some good interior plaster work. It too survives at 104 London Street and is best known for the adjoining Globe Theatre, Dunedin. In early 1864 Mason entered into a partnership with William Clayton (1823–77).

He now received more substantial commissions, two of them the greatest undertakings attempted in New Zealand up till then: the building for the New Zealand Exhibition and a new post office for the Otago provincial government. The first was completed in 1865 the second in 1868. The exhibition building had been conceived with additional pavilions, evident in a water colour by the artist George O'Brien. O'Brien also depicted the new post office, a structure so grand that before its completion it was decided it needed a higher purpose.

The exhibition building was a twin-towered palazzo in stuccoed brick, with corner turrets and the bold quoining already exhibited in the Dunedin Public Warehouse. It had a central, covered courtyard and was a descendant of Charles Fowler's design for the Covent Garden market building in London. It was situated on Great King Street and afterward became the city's hospital, serving the purpose until its demolition in 1933.

The post office, better known as the Stock Exchange (Exchange Building, Dunedin), was Mason's greatest achievement. It was built between 1864 and 1868. Described at the time as the finest building in the colony, it was a notable aesthetic success. A two-story stone building it was tendered at 22,960 pounds, occupied most of a city block and was another palazzo, arcaded and with a 120-foot high clock tower above the central entrance. It was symmetrical in plan and overall design and was described as "Palladian with Italian and Grecian features". There was a central hall with a highly decorated interior. Its street elevations appeared effortlessly noble. Recessed columns in the arcades, elaborate stone carving in the spandrels and the rhythmic alternation of deep arches and heavily rusticated pilasters contributed to the effect, as did the recession of the first floor from the ground floor's arcade. As a consequence the first floor was set like a temple atop a mighty, balustraded plinth to which the first floor's lofty pediments added a crowning, glorious note. The cosmopolitan assurance of the design was almost startling in the context. But the building's outstanding success seems to have contributed to its demise. Transferred to the university, for which purpose it wasn't suited, it became the premises of the Colonial Bank of New Zealand, and then the Stock Exchange suffering unfortunate modifications along the way. It was a mess of ill-considered additions when it was demolished in 1969.

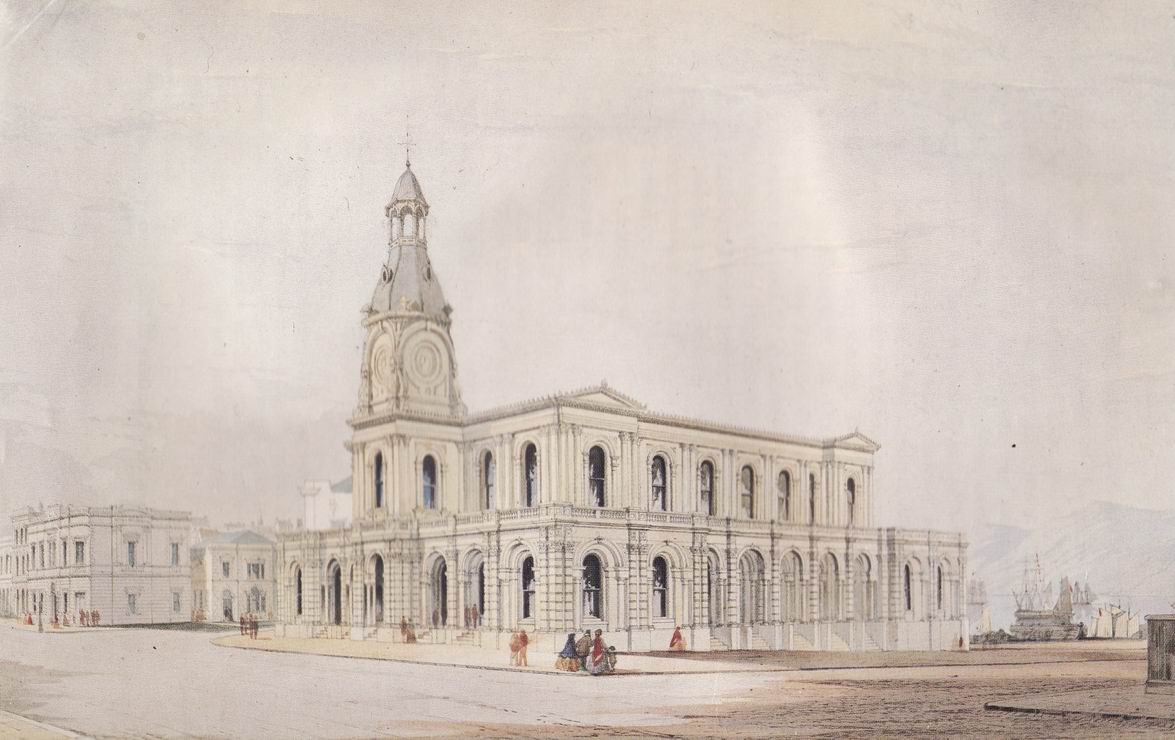
George O'Brien's c. 1865 watercolour of the Dunedin Post Office, designed by William Mason

At this time Mason and Clayton had also completed the large bond store later known as Edinburgh House and the Otago Provincial Council building on blocks immediately adjacent to the post office. Those too are now gone but All Saints' Church in North Dunedin survives. There has been some ambivalence about the relative responsibility of Mason and Clayton for this commission, but most commentators treat it as a joint production. Certainly Mason eventually completed it alone. An unusual building in polychromatic brick it reflects the innovations of William Butterfield in England. With its departure from a scholarly adherence to the Early Pointed manner of the Gothic style it also marks the onset of High Victorianism in New Zealand. This first portion of the building was finished in 1865.

At this time Mason was still a member of the house of representatives and on 21 July 1865, he was elected the first Mayor of Dunedin of the newly incorporated City of Dunedin, defeating four other candidates. He retired from parliament in 1866 and from the mayoralty in 1867. He was a cognisant, though not outspoken, member of the house. In the civic chair he presided over improvements to the city's drains and the levelling of streets. His Bank of New South Wales in Princes Street was completed in 1866, a refined, three storey masonry building. Recessed from the street and ornamented with gas lamps and pillars, it won high praise and a careful description from the Otago Daily Times. Its felicitous street front was removed in the 1970s.

== Later career in Dunedin and later life ==
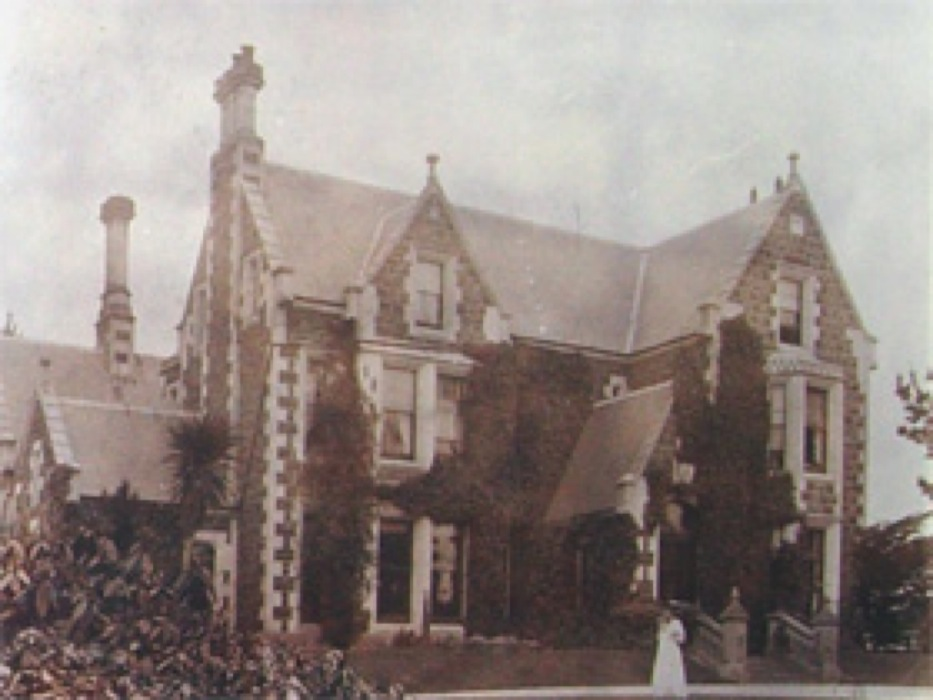
Bishopscourt as it was before it was extended.

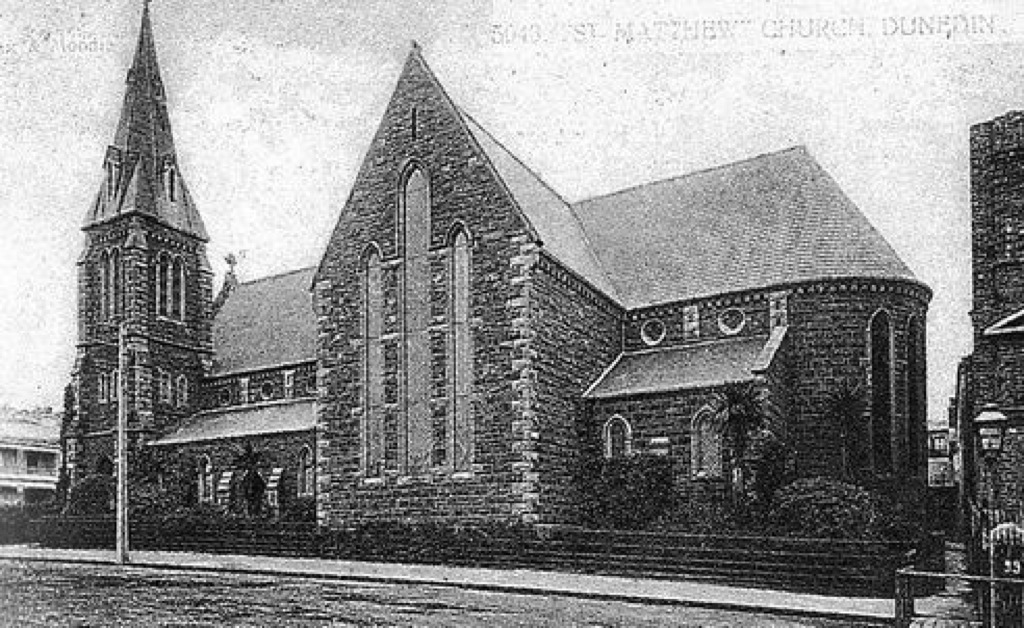
St. Matthew's Church Dunedin, late 19thC postcard.

Mason retired from architectural practice when he became Mayor and subsequently devoted himself to an estate in north Otago, the Punchbowl at Maheno. The partnership with Clayton ended in 1868 and in 1871 Mason formed a new one with his old clerk of works, Nathaniel Wales (1832–1903). Wales himself became Dunedin's mayor during the 1890s. Now in his seventh decade, Mason remained a vigorous designer. He completed Bishopscourt in Highgate for the Anglican bishop S.T. Nevill in 1872, and St Matthew's Anglican church in Stafford Street was started in 1873. The large stone house, high on the ridge behind the city, is somewhere between the perpendicular and Tudor forms of Gothic. It was later extended and survives as the core of Columba College, a Presbyterian girls school.

St Matthew's, in Caversham bluestone with unusual Port Chalmers stone dressings, is a large church, of strong design, very English in feeling, with aisles and octagonal piers. It is a contrast to All Saints and reflects a return to convention in English church design. Before it was completed Mason's wife Sarah died, on 22 September 1873. On 20 December that year he married Catherine Fenn, a widow thirty years his junior. Mason was still designing, completing the Otepopo Presbyterian church and the Standard Insurance Company's office in Princes Street (the Clarion building), in 1874, both of which survive. He then dissolved his partnership with Wales, after which he may have visited England.

On his return Mason moved with his new wife to Queenstown in 1876. He became active in public affairs there, later moved further into the high country to Paradise at the head of Lake Wakatipu, before eventually returning to Dunedin at the time of Queen Victoria's Diamond Jubilee celebrations in 1898. He had sold his city house and was staying at the Grand Hotel, now the Southern Cross, when he died.

== Assessment ==
John Stacpoole, Mason's biographer, made a careful comparison of his architecture against his peers', and found him superior to most of his contemporaries. This seems reasonable, although of his strict contemporaries there were relatively few in New Zealand and fewer still when Mason made his greatest contribution after his move to Dunedin. There it is natural to measure him against younger men such as R.A. Lawson (1833–1902) and Francis Petre (1847–1918), both acknowledged eminences among New Zealand's Victorian architects. Mason's active career did overlap Lawson's, though scarcely Petre's, but the comparison is somewhat skewed because these practitioners represented significantly different moments of architectural thought. In terms of the volume of his output, and that of his successive partnerships, Mason made a significant impact. As a professional he was highly regarded, a senior figure people turned to for advice on difficult matters. But in the post office, or Stock Exchange, he designed the first building in New Zealand of more than local distinction. Were it not for its neglect and demise he would now be recalled as the country's first significant architect.

== Notes ==
New Zealand Parliament
Preceded by John Williamson; John Jermyn Symonds	Member of Parliament for Pensioner Settlements; 1861–1866	Succeeded by Paul Frederick de Quincey
Political offices
New office	Mayor of Dunedin; 1865–1867	Succeeded by John Hyde Harris
