= Mary Anne Whitby =

English women scientist (1783–1850)

- Born: Mary Anne Theresa Symonds; 1783; England
- Died: 1850 (aged 66–67)
- Spouse: John Whitby
- Children: Theresa Cornwallis West
- Parent: Thomas Symonds (father)
- Relatives: William Symonds (brother); William Cornwallis Symonds (nephew); Thomas Symonds (nephew); Jermyn Symonds (nephew)
- Scientific career
- Fields: Zoology

Mary Anne Theresa Whitby (née Symonds; 1783–1850) was an English writer, landowner, and artist. She became an authority on the cultivation of silkworms, and in the 1830s reintroduced sericulture to the United Kingdom. During the 1840s, she corresponded extensively with Charles Darwin about silkworms, conducting breeding experiments to help develop his theories of natural selection.

== Early life ==
Mary Anne Theresa Symonds was born in 1783, the daughter of the Royal Navy officer Captain Thomas Symonds. Her elder brother William later became Surveyor of the Navy. Around the turn of the century she married Captain John Whitby, with whom she had one daughter. Whitby was flag captain for Admiral Sir William Cornwallis. After Cornwallis was removed from command of the Channel Fleet in early 1806, Whitby and his family were invited to live on his Newlands estate at Milford on Sea. John died shortly afterwards, on 6 April 1806, but Mary remained as a companion for Cornwallis during his retirement – he was prone to depression, and as he had spent much of his life at sea, he had few close friends in society and had never married. On his death in July 1819 she was bequeathed almost all of Cornwallis's estate. A small additional bequest went to William Symonds, Mary's brother, who used it to launch a successful career in naval architecture.

Whitby later acquired the Milford Baddesley estate, bringing together a large amount of the holdings in the area. She remained living on the estate for the rest of her life. In 1827 her daughter Theresa married the Hon. Frederick Richard West, the member of parliament for Denbigh and a cousin of the Earl De la Warr. Their children took Cornwallis as a middle name; the most notable of these was William Cornwallis-West, who also became a member of parliament.

== Sericulture ==
In 1835, Whitby was travelling in Italy when she encountered stories of an English businessman who had made substantial profits from silkworms on a mulberry plantation near Milan. She resolved to try the same project in England, hoping that as well as turning a profit it would be able to reintroduce the industry to the country and provide employment for poor women. Early attempts had been made to introduce mulberries and silkworms by James I of England in the early seventeenth century, but while the trees had survived the silkworms had not thrived.

It took her a decade to develop economically viable silk production – the major problem proved to be processing the raw silk, rather than rearing the silkworms – but she persevered, and in 1844 produced twenty yards of damask, which she presented to Queen Victoria.

== Work with Darwin ==
In 1846, Whitby read a paper on the breeding of silkworms at a meeting of the British Association for the Advancement of Science in Southampton. Here she met Charles Darwin, who later asked her to perform a series of experiments on heritability in silkworms, looking at whether characteristics such as silklessness were passed down between generations of worms – "for in a work which I intend some few years hence to publish on variation, there will be hardly any facts in the insect world". He also asked her for advice on a series of other questions, including the flight of domesticated moths and the behaviour of different breeds of caterpillars.

She provided him with a set of specimens of moths, noting their sexual dimorphism, and promised to carry out some more detailed investigations; her selective breeding experiments over the next two years persuaded Darwin that characteristics in the larval stage were inherited, a result which he later published in The Variation of Animals and Plants Under Domestication (1868).

== See also ==
- Timeline of women in science

== Sources ==
- Colp, R (July 1972). "Charles Darwin and Mrs. Whitby". Bulletin of the New York Academy of Medicine. 48 (6): 870–876. PMC 1806755. PMID 4557523.
- Mary Anne Theresa Whitby, 1784–1850, Darwin Correspondence Project (2013).
