= John Bacot =

New Zealand politician (1821–1888)

John Thomas Watson Bacot (1821–1888) was a New Zealand politician in the Auckland Region. He was a medical officer for the army.

== Biography ==
New Zealand Parliament
Years	Term	Electorate	Party
1853–1855	1st	Pensioner Settlements	Independent

Bacot arrived in New Zealand in June 1848 to take up a position as medical officer to the Pensioner Settlements, having previously served as an assistant surveyor in the British Army in India. He lived at Bleak House, which he sold to Every Maclean. There was a double-wedding of MacDonald sisters—daughters of Alexander MacDonald—at the Roman Catholic Church at Howick on 13 September 1851; Bacot married Anne Agnes MacDonald (1831–1900). Bacot's father-in-law was a staff-officer for the Royal New Zealand Fencibles holding the rank of captain. MacDonald had a house built in 1856 shortly before his death; the house still stands and is registered with Heritage New Zealand.

Bacot was a member of New Zealand's 1st Parliament, one of the two members representing the Pensioner Settlements electorate – he was elected alongside Joseph Greenwood in the 1853 general election. Three candidates had contested the election, with Theodore Haultain being unsuccessful. The electorate included the Auckland suburbs of Howick, Onehunga, Ōtāhuhu, and Panmure. The 1855 general election was contested by five candidates, and Bacot was defeated by Greenwood and John Williamson.

Bacot returned to England in February 1859, where he became Inspector-General of Hospitals. In December 1863, the Bacots lost two of their sons within three days; at the time, they were living in Croydon. He died at Seaton in Devonshire in 1888. His widow died in November 1899.

New Zealand Parliament
New constituency	Member of Parliament for Pensioner Settlements; 1853–1855; Served alongside: Joseph Greenwood	Succeeded by John Williamson
