= Paul Frederick de Quincey =

New Zealand politician

- In office 1866–1867
- Prime Minister: Edward Stafford
- Preceded by: William Mason
- Succeeded by: John Kerr

Personal details
- Born: 26 November 1828 Dove Cottage, Grasmere, Westmoreland, England
- Died: 15 April 1894 (aged 66) Auckland, New Zealand
- Spouse: Charlotte Emily Pilling
- Relations: Thomas De Quincey
- Profession: soldier, politician, farmer

Paul Frederick de Quincey (26 November 1828 – 15 April 1894) was a 19th-century Member of Parliament in Auckland, New Zealand. de Quincey served in India from 1846 to 1860, and during the Invasion of Waikato in 1863.

== Early life ==
De Quincey was born at Dove Cottage, Grasmere, Westmoreland. He was the son of the great English writer Thomas De Quincey, who moved with his family to Edinburgh a year after he was born. When he was eight, de Quincey's mother died, leading him to be sent to live with his paternal grandmother who lived near Bath, Somerset, at a residence called Weston Lea.

He received his education at the High School, Edinburgh, and at the Lasswade School, near that city. He entered the army 2 May 1845 as ensign in the 70th (Surrey) Regiment, and served with distinction in India from 1846, including being present with the 80th (Staffordshire Volunteers) Regiment at the Battle of Sobraon in February 1846, during the first Anglo-Sikh War, for which he was awarded the campaign medal. He became a lieutenant on 31 July 1846, and captain on 9 January 1858. During the war, de Quincey contracted malaria, which continued to impact his health for the rest of his life. In 1859, he received an inheritance from his grandmother, after she died.

In 1860, having become successively captain and major of brigade on the permanent staff of the Bengal Presidency, he was ordered with his old regiment, which he had rejoined after serving with several others, for active service in New Zealand.

== New Zealand ==
Colonel de Quincey arrived in New Zealand on 13 May 1861, where he commanded the 1st Company Transport Corps, and then rejoined his regiment; but seeing no prospect of returning to India without sacrificing his position, sold out, and turned his attention to farming, with the unsatisfactory results usually experienced by military men.

On 7 January 1862, de Quincey purchased 202 acres (82 ha) of land at Pakuranga, Auckland, and constructed a five-bedroom house in the same year. de Quincey planned to retire as a farmer in Pakuranga. In 1874, the first hares liberated by the Pakuranga Hunt Club were released on his farm.

In 1863, the war in the Waikato breaking out, and the Auckland Militia being called out for active service, he was appointed to the command of the left wing of the 3rd Battalion Artillery, with a captain's commission and without pay, and embodied it on those terms. Major-General Galloway, under whom he had served in India, on being appointed to the command of the colonial forces selected Captain de Quincey as his military secretary, to which appointment he was gazetted with the rank of major, and soon afterwards he was gazetted to a lieutenant-colonelcy. On General Galloway leaving the colony in 1864, he was succeeded in the command by Colonel Haultain, Lieut.-Col. de Quincey continuing as military secretary.

Since the Waikato war in the Auckland Province finished in 1864, he lived principally in the country. For a time, he was acting coroner in Howick.

New Zealand Parliament
Years	Term	Electorate	Party
1866–1867	4th	Pensioner Settlements	Independent

De Quincey entered politics in 1865, becoming a member of the Auckland Provincial Council until 1869. Additionally, De Quincey represented the Pensioner Settlements electorate in Parliament from 1866 to 1867, when he resigned. In 1889, he was appointed as Serjeant-at-Arms of the House of Representatives by the Speaker. He held this role until his death and was succeeded by William Fraser.

De Quincey became a Justice of the peace in 1880, and sat on the bench of the Howick Courthouse.

He died at his residence, Cambridge House in Vincent Street in central Auckland, on Sunday, 15 April 1894. He was buried in nearby Purewa Cemetery.

In 1978, the former De Quincey farm was subdivided, leading owner Hugh Green to donate de Quincey's farmhouse to the Howick Historical Village. The cottage is used to display the Māori history of East Auckland.

== Personal life ==
On 13 February 1866, he married Charlotte Emily Pilling at Howick. She was the widow of Captain Oswald Pilling. His stepdaughter was Florence Henrietta Pilling, who married John FitzRoy Beresford Peacocke in 1875. Peacocke's father, Stephen Ponsonby Peacocke, had been a member of the New Zealand Legislative Council until his death in 1872.

== Notes ==
New Zealand Parliament
Preceded by William Mason	Member of Parliament for Pensioner Settlements; 1866–1867	Succeeded by John Kerr
