= William Cornwallis Symonds =

New Zealand public servant

- Born: 1 August 1810; Lymington, Hampshire, England
- Died: 23 November 1841 (aged 31); Manukau Harbour, Auckland, New Zealand
- Relatives: William Symonds (father); Thomas Symonds (grandfather); Mary Anne Whitby (aunt); Thomas Symonds (brother); Jermyn Symonds (brother)
- Military career
- Allegiance: United Kingdom
- Branch: (United Kingdom of Great Britain and Ireland) British Army
- Years of service: 1828–1841
- Rank: Captain
- Units: 38th Regiment of Foot; 74th Regiment of Foot; 96th Regiment of Foot

Captain William Cornwallis Symonds (1 August 1810 – 23 November 1841) was a British Army officer who was prominent in the early colonisation of New Zealand.

== Biography ==
Symonds was born at Lymington, Hampshire in 1810, the eldest son of William Symonds, Surveyor of the Navy, who was a prominent member of the New Zealand Association. He was commissioned into the 38th Foot, promoted to the rank of lieutenant in 1832, transferred to the 74th Foot in 1835, and promoted Captain in 1838.

He came to New Zealand in the early 1830s as an agent of the Waitemata and Manukau Land Company and was instrumental in the founding of Auckland and the signing of the Treaty of Waitangi. He was one of Governor William Hobson's closest and most effective officials and was one of the first six Police Magistrates in New Zealand. Symonds was instrumental in convincing Hobson to make Auckland the capital of New Zealand in 1840. He was Chief Magistrate of Auckland and in 1841 was appointed Deputy Surveyor-General of New Zealand, and laid out Auckland under Felton Mathew.

In the late 1830s, Symonds, alongside Theophilus Heale and Dudley Sinclair (son of Scottish aristocrat Sir George Sinclair), attempted to develop a section of coast alongside the Waitākere Ranges as a trading post and timbermill, which Symonds named Cornwallis after his late uncle, Charles Cornwallis, 1st Marquess Cornwallis. The plan of the township was laid out, however it was never developed. After the signing of the Treaty of Waitangi in 1840, Symonds was summoned to testify at the Crown Land Commission to examine the private land deal that led to the creation of Cornwallis, however the court was dissatisfied at the lack of information around the trade goods that were given to Ngāti Whātua, and banned logging activities at Cornwallis for two years until the agreement could be settled. When Scottish settlers arrived at the barren settlement in 1840, he provided them food and support. On 20 March 1840, Symonds and James Hamlin organised for a signing of the Treaty of Waitangi on the Āwhitu Peninsula, where Apihai Te Kawau of Ngāti Whātua signed, but several Waikato Tainui chiefs refused.

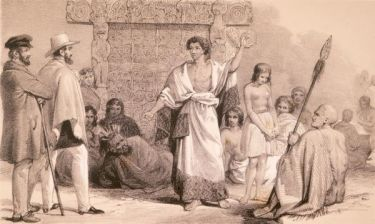
Ernst Dieffenbach's party and Te Waro, April 1841. Artist: Joseph Jenner Merrett

During 1841, Symonds accompanied the naturalist Ernst Dieffenbach in his survey of the North Island. On 3 May 1841, Symonds was appointed to the original Legislative Council. He died in a boating accident on 23 November 1841, while sailing across the Manukau Harbour to deliver supplies to the sick wife of missionary James Hamlin on the Āwhitu Peninsula. His death was deeply regretted by Hobson.

Symonds Street and Symonds Street Cemetery in Auckland are named after him. Symonds Street in the Auckland suburb of Onehunga is named after his brother Jermyn.
