= Alfred Horton =

Alfred George Horton (c. 1843–11 March 1903) was a New Zealand printer, newspaper proprietor and editor, businessman. He was born in Lincolnshire, England in c. 1843. He was a part-owner of The New Zealand Herald. He died at Auckland on 11 March 1903. Within months, his two business partners also died and ownership of the Herald went to his son, Henry Horton, later in 1903.
