= Joseph Greenwood =

New Zealand politician (1816–1861)

- Born: 24 November 1816; St Pancras, London
- Died: 18 July 1861 (aged 44); 90 Clarendon Square, Somers Town, London
- Burial place: Highgate Cemetery, London
- Spouse: Catherine Sabina Perroux (m. 1838)
- Military career
- Allegiance: United Kingdom
- Branch: (United Kingdom of Great Britain and Ireland) British Army
- Service years: 1836–1861
- Rank: Captain
- Units: 31st Regiment,1836– 34th Regiment (cancelled), 1842– 31st Regiment, 1843– Unattached, 1858–1861
- Campaigns: First Anglo-Afghan War; Mazeena; Tezeen; Jugdulluck; Cabul
- Awards: Cabul medal
- Memorials: St John the Baptist, Kentish Town, Highgate Road and Greenwood Place, London

Captain Joseph Greenwood (24 November 1816 – 18 July 1861) was a soldier and New Zealand politician.

== Early years ==
Greenwood was born on 24 November 1816 in St Pancras, London, a son of Thomas Greenwood (4 April 1779 – 14 March 1842) and Esther (née Munden) (25 April 1784 – 28 May 1875), the youngest of six children.

Residing at Russell Square, London, in 1824, Thomas inherited an old country inn, the Bull & Gate in Kentish Town, from his late mother Elizabeth's estate, and later retired to 21 Cumberland Terrace, Regent's Park.

== Career ==
Though Greenwood's mother had aspirations for him to be a high and shining light in the Church, from early years his ultimate ambition was to be a soldier. Commissions, however, were not easily attained.

Whilst training at a military academy in Hanover, Germany, Greenwood was recalled home to London, shortly thereafter to receive an appointment, dated 6 May 1836, as Ensign of the 31st (Huntingdonshire) Regiment of Foot, then stationed at Dinapore, Bengal, India. He wrote:

Never shall I forget the feelings with which I rushed up to my mother's room to show her the important document. I felt I had my foot on the first step of the ladder by which I was to mount to the summit of my ambition. Had I been made a peer of the realm I should not have felt prouder than I did with that letter in my pocket; and when my dear father bade me remember that the Duke of Wellington's career commenced in India, and smilingly asked why mine should not be as glorious, I thought not of the weary years that must roll by, ere I could hope to command even a company. I was an ensign, that was certain: — and that I should shortly be a colonel, was equally so."

In October 1836, he embarked from Gravesend, for Calcutta. After ten days in Calcutta, he and company marched to Dinapore by road, via Ragonathpore and Hazareebaug, more than 600 km (370 mi), whilst brother officers made their way in boats by the Ganges.

He married Catherine Sabina Perroux, daughter of the late John Perroux and Sultana (née Panioty) of Calcutta, at Patna on 24 September 1838, just before leaving Dinapore in October to relieve the 44th (East Essex) Regiment of Foot at Ghazeepore on the Ganges, where East India Company had operated an opium factory since 1820. He was promoted Lieutenant from 27 October 1839.

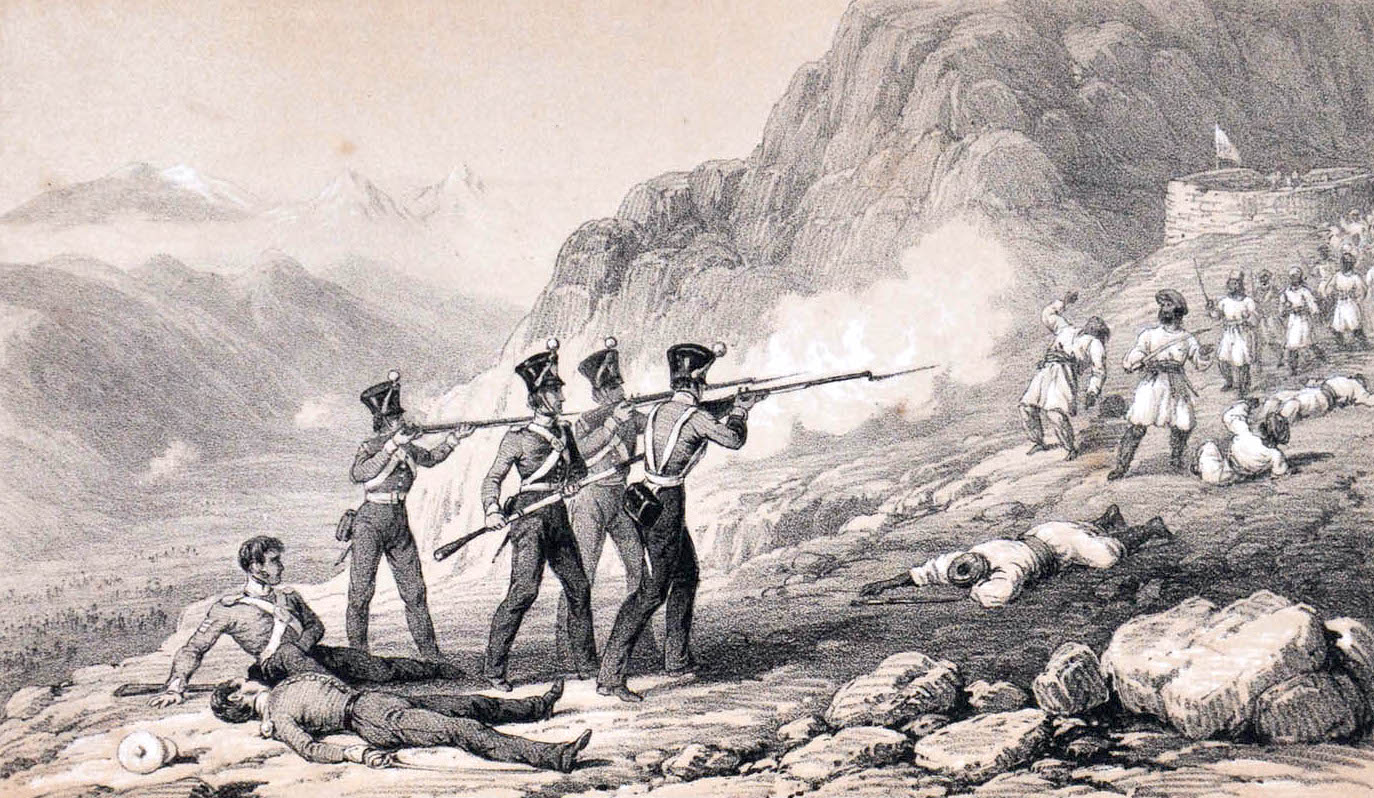
Heroic conduct of four privates, of H.M. 31st Regiment, at the Battle of Mazeena. Artist: Henry Martens

He served throughout the 1842 campaign of the First Anglo-Afghan War, under General George Pollock, where he distinguished himself and wrote an account of the war, which was considered an authority on the campaign. He was present at actions of Mezeena, Tezeen, Jugdulluck and the occupation of Cabul.

Whilst in Afghanistan, his friends in England arranged for him to exchange regiments with William Bayley Money, to be a lieutenant of the 34th (Cumberland) Regiment of Foot, stationed at home, dated 5 August 1842. On hearing of his reassignment, and on arriving at Ferozepore on 19 December 1842, he left, via Loodianah and Kumaul, to rejoin his wife some 420 km (260 mi) away at Meerut, then moved on to Calcutta. Returned home to England from India in 1844, he was relieved to find that his mother had conveyed his concerns to the Commander in Chief, the Duke of Wellington, and Horse Guards, with the effect of cancelling the exchange, leaving him with the 31st Regiment, since February 1843, and now to rejoin its depot at Chatham.

Catherine and Joseph's son was born at Harwich, Essex, on 17 April 1846, and named Colin Halkett Greenwood after the regiment's colonel, Sir Colin Halkett, to whom he'd dedicated his 1844 book on the war in Afghanistan.

Promoted to the rank of Captain without purchase since 31 March 1846, Greenwood took on the role of brigade major in Auckland, New Zealand, on staff of Major-General George Dean Pitt (1781–1851) in 1847, and in the same capacity, served Major-General Robert Wynyard (1802–1864) following the death of General Pitt.

Leaving Gravesend on 1 July 1847, on the barque Minerva, in company with General Pitt and family, Captain Smith, 55th Regiment, and wife, and 80 Royal New Zealand Fencibles and families, Greenwood and family arrived in Auckland on 8 October. They resided at a substantial lot and townhouse fronting Emily Place (Lot 15, Section 4), opposite St Paul's Church, on the corner with Princes Street and Shortland Crescent / Street.

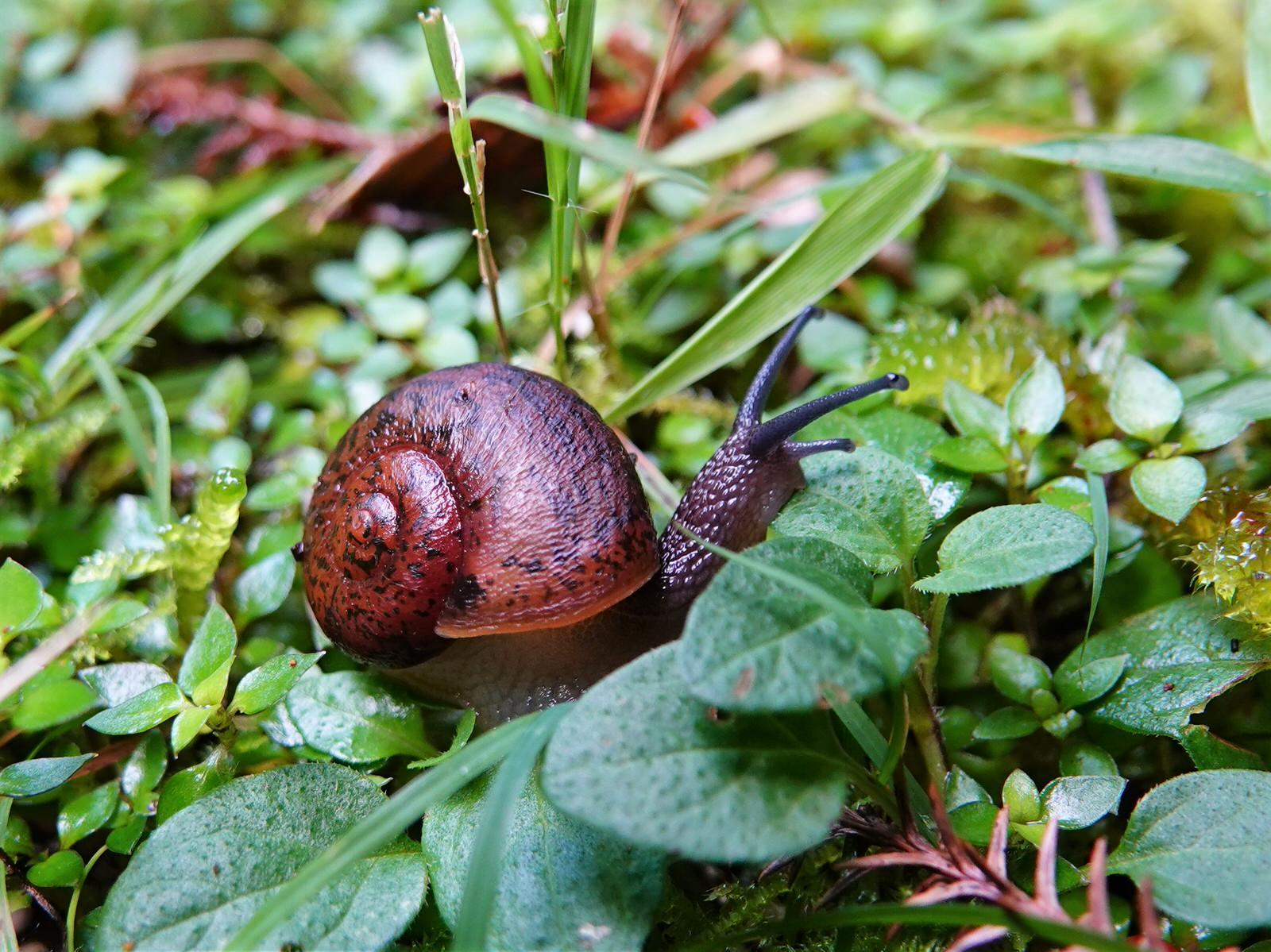
Rhytida greenwoodi. Original name: Helix greenwoodii Gray, 1850

Greenwood transmitted a number of small species of terrestrial and fluviatile Mollusca, which he had collected near Auckland, to John Edward Gray, FRS, assumedly for the British Museum collection. In a paper to the Zoological Society of London, dated 11 December 1849, Gray described Helix greenwoodii, a medium-sized, air-breathing predatory New Zealand land snail, and named it after Greenwood. Elected a member of the Royal Society of Van Diemen's Land in November 1849, along with Sir George Grey, Andrew Sinclair, Lt Col Daniel Bolton, RE, Walter Mantell and William Swainson from New Zealand, Greenwood also presented a box of marine, freshwater and terrestrial shells to the Society in 1850.

In 1850 he travelled from Auckland to Taupō, and published an account of his travels. Greenwood owned extensive farm properties, called Ascot, in Mangarei (Māngere), and built a house there in 1852.

New Zealand Parliament
| Years | Term | Electorate | Party |
|---|---|---|---|
| 1853–1855 | 1st | Pensioner Settlements | Independent |
| 1855–1857 | 2nd | Pensioner Settlements | Independent |

Nominated by a body of electors as a candidate for the House of Representatives, he served in the first and second New Zealand Parliaments, representing the Pensioner Settlements electorate consisting of the Auckland suburbs of Howick, Onehunga, Ōtāhuhu, and Panmure from 1853. He also served on the Auckland Provincial Council, representing the Pensioner Settlements electorate from 1855.

Aware, in early 1857, that his term of service as brigade major had long since fully expired and his successor as was soon expected, Greenwood published notice of his resignation from the Auckland Provincial Council on 20 March and commenced efforts to sell or lease his 750 acre farm with houses, Ascot, at Mangere, sell stock, and let or lease the land and villa in Stanley Street, Auckland. He resigned from Parliament on 3 August 1857, around halfway through its second term.

On 13 August 1857, Captain Greenwood, wife Catherine, son Colin and servant departed Auckland for Sydney on the brig Sporting Lass. His successor as brigade major, Captain Frederick Rice Stack, 65th (2nd Yorkshire, North Riding) Regiment of Foot, arrived on the ship Solent from London on 30 August.

Greenwood's health and well-being became a matter of concern soon after his arrival home toward the end of December 1857. He was unattached from his regiment and placed on half-pay from 23 April 1858. That year, he took a break to recuperate with his friends, Captain John and Teresa Scott, who operated a lodge and shooting excursions at Strontian, Argyllshire. Scott had sold out of the 31st Regiment back in 1847. After Scotland, Greenwood consulted experts whilst staying with Scott at Brighton. His brother, John Greenwood, negotiated the terms of mutual separation between Catherine and himself.

Though the recently established Alpine Club elected Greenwood to membership on 3 December 1861, he appeared to not take up his election. Greenwood had died at no. 90 Clarendon Square, Somers Town, London or no. 21 Cumberland Terrace, Regent's Park, London, on 18 July 1861, aged 44.

His son, Colin Halkett Greenwood (1846–1894), was a land and house proprietor, and landscape painter (artist).

== Published works ==
- Greenwood, Joseph (1844). Narrative of the Late Victorious Campaign in Affghanistan, under General Pollock: With Recollections of Seven Years' service in India. London: Henry Colburn.
- Greenwood, Joseph (1850). Journey to Taupo, from Auckland = Haerenga ki Taupo, i Akarana. Translated by Davis, Charles Oliver. Auckland. Originally published in The Maori Messenger. Te Karere Maori:
  - Greenwood, Joseph (9 May 1850). "Journey to Taupo, From Auckland". The Maori Messenger. Te Karere Maori. Vol. 2, no. 36. pp. 2–3.
  - Greenwood, Joseph (23 May 1850). "Journey to Taupo, From Auckland [Continued from our last.]". The Maori Messenger. Te Karere Maori. Vol. 2, no. 37. pp. 3–4.
  - Greenwood, Joseph (6 June 1850). "Journey to Taupo, From Auckland [Continued from our last.]". The Maori Messenger. Te Karere Maori. Vol. 2, no. 38. pp. 2–4.
  - Greenwood, Joseph (20 June 1850). "Journey to Taupo, From Auckland". The Maori Messenger. Te Karere Maori. Vol. 2, no. 39. pp. 3–4.
  - Greenwood, Joseph (4 July 1850). "Journey to Taupo, From Auckland. [Concluded.]". The Maori Messenger. Te Karere Maori. Vol. 2, no. 40. pp. 3–4.

== Notes ==
New Zealand Parliament
| New constituency | Member of Parliament for Pensioner Settlements; 1853–1857; Served alongside: John Bacot, John Williamson | Succeeded by Jermyn Symonds |
