= Jermyn Symonds =

British judge (1816-1883)

John Jermyn Symonds
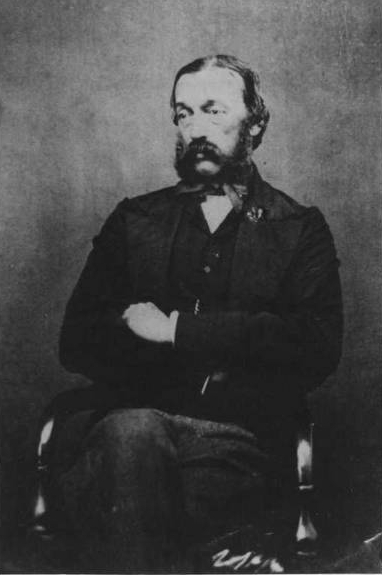
- Seated portrait of J. Jermyn Symonds

Member of the New Zealand Parliament for Pensioner Settlements
- In office 29 April 1858 – 1860
- Preceded by: Joseph Greenwood
- Succeeded by: William Mason

Personal details
- Born: 4 January 1816 England
- Died: 3 January 1883 (aged 66) Onehunga, New Zealand
- Spouse: Alethia Wilson (m. 1849)
- Children: 5
- Parent: William Symonds (father)
- Relatives: Thomas Symonds (grandfather); Mary Anne Whitby (aunt); William Cornwallis Symonds (brother); Thomas Symonds (brother)
- Profession: Judge
- Military career
- Allegiance: United Kingdom
- Branch: British Army
- Service years: 1843-1846
- Rank: Captain
- Units: 40th (the 2nd Somersetshire) Regiment of Foot; 99th (Lanarkshire) Regiment of Foot
- Conflicts: Flagstaff War; Battle of Ohaeawai; Battle of Ruapekapeka

Captain John Jermyn Symonds (4 January 1816 – 3 January 1883) was a 19th-century Member of Parliament in Auckland, New Zealand. He purchased land for the New Zealand Company and was later a judge of the Native Land Court.

== Biography ==
Symonds was born in 1816 as the youngest son of the family. His father was Sir William Symonds. On the recommendation of Lord Normanby, he joined the survey department in New South Wales in 1839. He arrived at Auckland, New Zealand, on 1 October 1840 to join his elder brother William Cornwallis Symonds, but his brother drowned in a boating accident in November 1841. For a while, he was acting protector of aborigines and was in charge of purchase of land from Māori, and the survey of that land. In 1843, he obtained a commission as Ensign in the 40th (the 2nd Somersetshire) Regiment of Foot, then stationed in India. However, he never joined the regiment but remained in New Zealand. In 1844, he purchased the Otago block with Frederick Tuckett on behalf of the New Zealand Company.

Sometime in 1844, he transferred to the 99th (Lanarkshire) Regiment of Foot, then stationed in Australia. In April 1845, he joined his regiment in Sydney, only to return to New Zealand with the 99th Regiment at the end of May 1845. He took part in the Flagstaff War and was present at the Battle of Ohaeawai and fall of Ruapekapeka.

In January 1846, he became private secretary to Governor George Grey. The governor transferred an island in the Firth of Thames to Symonds to create a test case regarding the Crown's pre-emptive right of purchase to Māori land deriving from the Treaty of Waitangi; in R v Symonds, the court decided in favour of the Crown's case. In 1847, he was one of the founding members of the Auckland Savings Bank. He returned to England in 1848, where he married in 1849. He came back to New Zealand in 1849 in charge of a detachment of the Fencibles, which he settled in Onehunga. He became a justice of the peace in 1853, was appointed Native Secretary in 1855, and became Onehunga's resident magistrate and returning officer in 1856.

New Zealand Parliament
Years	Term	Electorate	Party
1858–1860	2nd	Pensioner Settlements	Independent

He resigned from those roles when he was elected to represent the Pensioner Settlements electorate from 1858 to 1860, when he retired. In 1861, he was again appointed Resident Magistrate. He was a judge of the Native Land Court from 1862 to his retirement in 1882.

Symonds died suddenly on 3 January 1883. He was ill for only half an hour and in the beginning did not think it necessary to call for his son-in-law, who was a doctor. He was survived by his wife, four daughters, and one son. His wife (Alethia Seymour, née Wilson) died in November 1898.

Symonds Street in Onehunga is named after him, as well as Symonds Bay in Laingholm. Symonds Street and Symonds Street Cemetery in Auckland are named after his brother.

== Notes ==
New Zealand Parliament
Preceded by Joseph Greenwood	Member of Parliament for Pensioner Settlements; 1858–1860; Served alongside: John Williamson	Succeeded by William Mason
