= Robert Grosvenor (aviator) =

British World War I flying ace

Robert Arthur Grosvenor
- Born: 25 May 1895; Chester
- Died: 12 June 1953 (aged 58); Chaddleworth, Berkshire, England
- Military career
- Allegiance: England
- Branch: Aviation
- Rank: Captain
- Nickname: Robin
- Units: No. 18 Squadron RFC, No. 20 Squadron RFC, No. 57 Squadron RFC, No. 84 Squadron RAF
- Awards: Military Cross with Bar

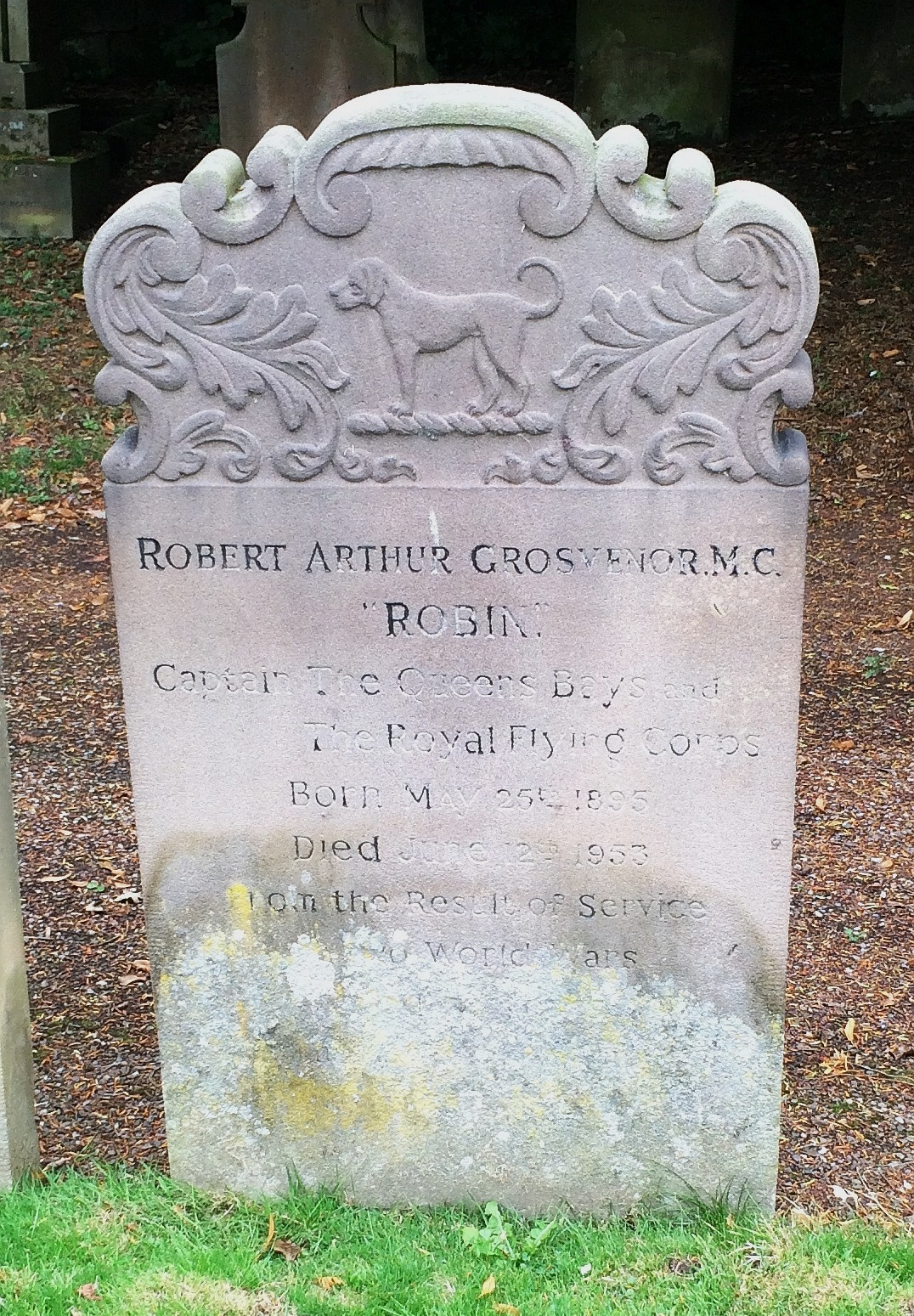
Grave of Captain Robert Arthur "Robin" Grosvenor (1895–1953)

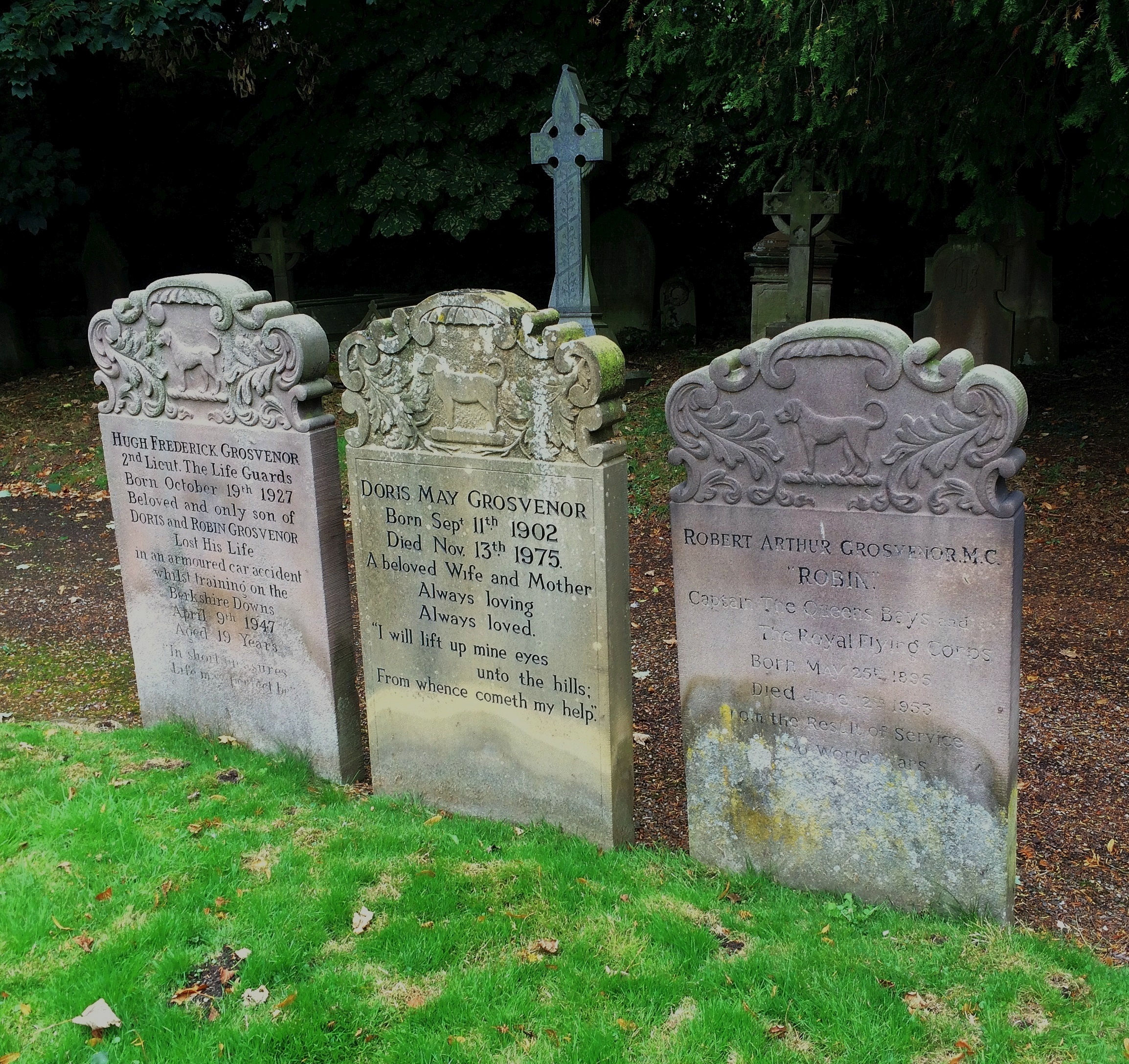
Grosvenor family graves at St Mary's Church, Eccleston: Hugh Frederick (1927–1947), his mother Doris (1902–1975) and his father Robin (1895–1953), a grandson of the 1st Duke of Westminster

Captain Robert Arthur "Robin" Grosvenor was a World War I flying ace credited with 16 aerial victories.

He was the son of Helen Sheffield and Lieutenant Colonel Lord Arthur Hugh Grosvenor, a son of the 1st Duke of Westminster.

Robin Grosvenor scored his first triumph on 6 December 1917 while flying a RAF SE.5a for No. 84 Squadron. He would not score again until 18 February, but during the next three months after that scored 15 more victories. His victory tally was split evenly between enemy aircraft destroyed and those driven down, at eight each. He shared a victory with another pilot in both categories.

Postwar, Grosvenor married Doris May Wignall on 9 December 1925. He was elected as a member of the Royal Aero Club on 2 May 1929.

Robin Grosvenor is buried in the churchyard of Eccleston Church near Eaton Hall, Cheshire. He died a month before his first cousin Hugh Grosvenor, 2nd Duke of Westminster, from whom he would have inherited the ducal title had he survived him, which instead passed to another cousin, William.

== Honors and awards ==
Military Cross (MC)

Lt. (T./Capt.) Robert Arthur Grosvenor, Dn. Gds., and R.A.F.

For conspicuous gallantry and devotion to duty as a leader of offensive patrols against hostile aircraft and troops on the ground. On one occasion his patrol was attacked from the rear by five enemy scouts. By skilful piloting he manoeuvred his machine into position behind one of the scouts, which he shot down in flames. He was attacked again, and drove the scout to destruction. On other occasions he has destroyed and driven down out of control at least eight hostile machines.

Military Cross (MC) Bar

Lt. (T./Capt.) Robert Arthur Grosvenor, M.C., Dgn. Gds. and R.A.F.

"For conspicuous gallantry and devotion to duty in attacking enemy aircraft. He has lately destroyed two machines and driven down four others out of control. He has shown brilliant leadership and dash against heavy odds."
