= St Mary's Church, Eccleston =

Coordinates: 53.1576°N 2.8794°W

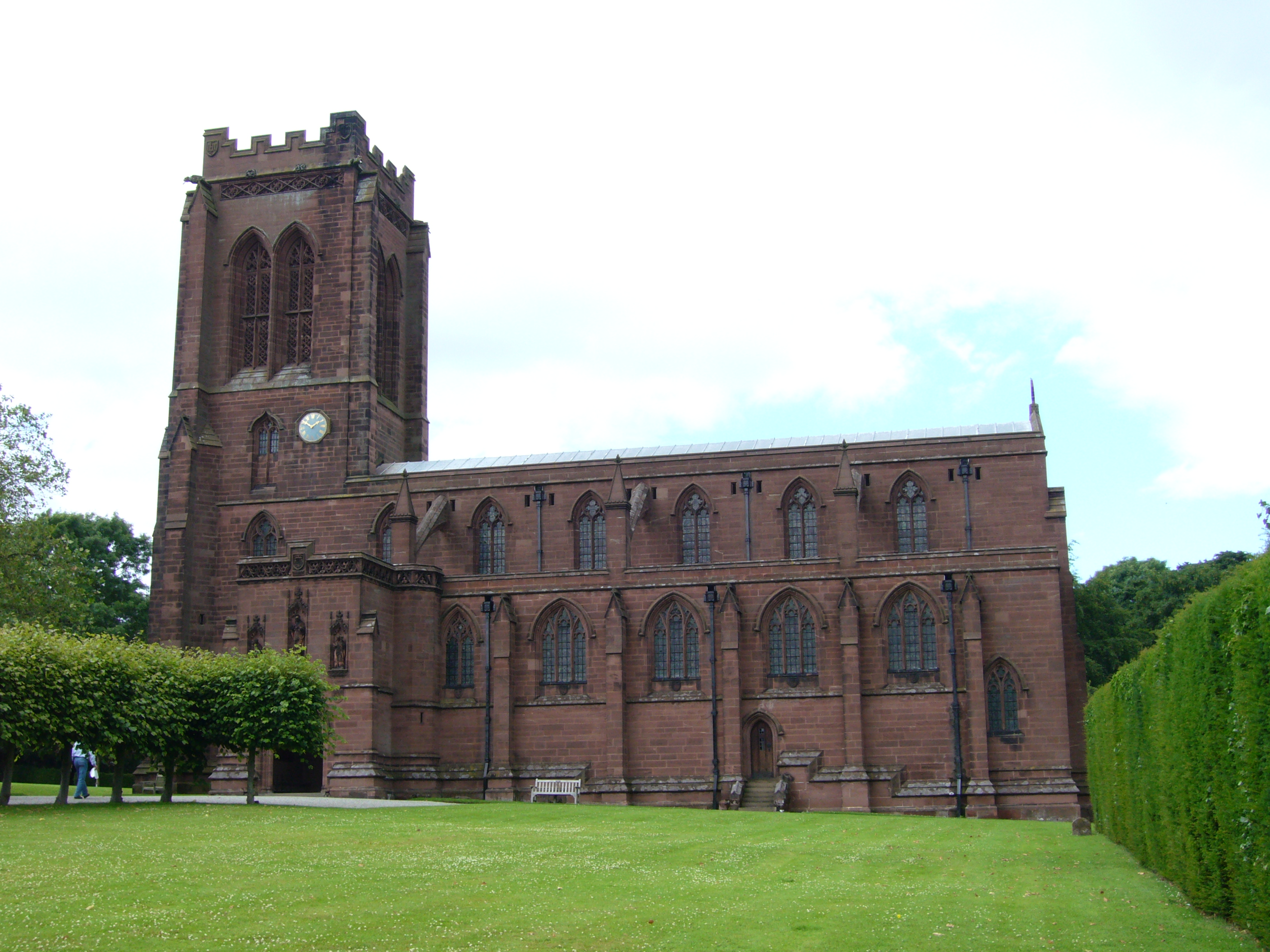
- St Mary's Church, Eccleston, from the south

- Location within Cheshire
- OS grid reference: SJ 412 626
- Location: Eccleston, Cheshire
- Country: England
- Denomination: Anglican
- Website: St Mary's Church, Eccleston

History
- Status: Parish church

Architecture
- Functional status: Active
- Heritage designation: Grade I
- Designated: 1 June 1967
- Architect: G. F. Bodley
- Architectural type: Church
- Style: Gothic Revival
- Completed: 1899
- Construction cost: £40,000

Specifications
- Materials: Red sandstone

Administration
- Province: York
- Diocese: Chester
- Archdeaconry: Chester
- Deanery: Chester
- Parish: Eccleston and Pulford

Clergy
- Rector: Rev Dr Stephen Torr

St Mary's Church is in the village of Eccleston, Cheshire, England, on the estate of the Duke of Westminster south of Chester. The church is recorded in the National Heritage List for England as a designated Grade I listed building. It is an active Anglican parish church in the diocese of Chester, the archdeaconry of Chester and the deanery of Chester. Its benefice is combined with that of St Mary, Pulford. The Dukes of Westminster are buried in the adjacent Old Churchyard.

== History ==
St Mary's Church as it appears today is a red sandstone building which dates from the 19th century. It was built between 1897 and 1899 to a design by G. F. Bodley for the 1st Duke of Westminster at a cost of £40,000 (£4.44 million today). The new church was consecrated on Ascension Day 1900.

The present building is the third parish church to have been built in Eccleston. It stands some 100 metres (330 ft) southwest of the site occupied by its predecessors, which stood in what is known today as the Old Churchyard. A church was certainly in existence in Eccleston in 1188, and in the late 18th century a print was made of a dilapidated medieval church which dates back to the 14th century. The medieval church was entirely replaced in 1809 by one of similar size, built on the site by William Porden for the Earls Grosvenor. A chancel was added in 1853, but by the end of the 19th century the 1st Duke of Westminster decided to replace Porden's church with an entirely new structure. After the new church had been completed, Porden's church was demolished, although the south wall of its nave was retained as a "picturesque feature" and remains in the Old Churchyard.

== Architecture ==
=== Exterior ===
The church is built in red ashlar sandstone. Its plan consists of a west tower, a continuous six-bay nave, a chancel with a clerestory, north and south aisles, and north and south porches. A long vestry block projects to the north. The tower has long bell-openings, irregular buttresses and an embattled top. Canopied niches above the south door contain statues. The church is considered to be an example of Bodley's mature style anticipating features of Liverpool Cathedral.

=== Interior ===
St Mary's has a nave with north and south aisles and a South porch. Under the tower in the West is the baptistery with a font.

==== North aisle and chapel ====
The east end of the north aisle houses the organ loft and the vestry. There is also a large brass plaque listing those members of the Grosvenor family who were buried in the vault once part of Porden's old church. Their resting place in the northeast part of the Old Churchyard is now marked with a simple memorial and surrounded by a low wall with crosses in the corners.

The organ was built in 1899 by Gray & Davison. It was modified around 1910 by Henry Poyser and further modified in 1984.

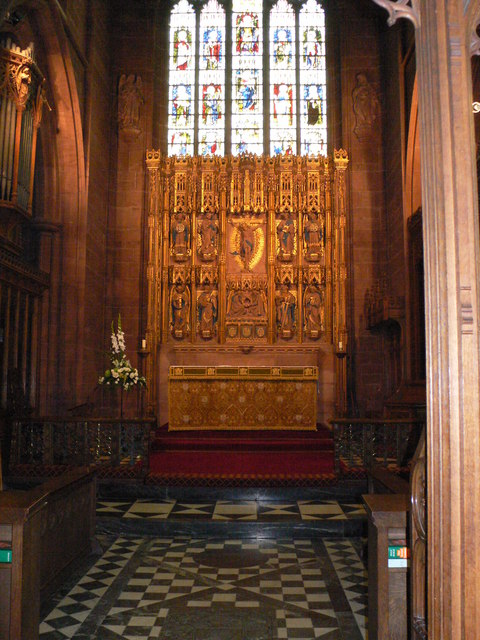
The high altar

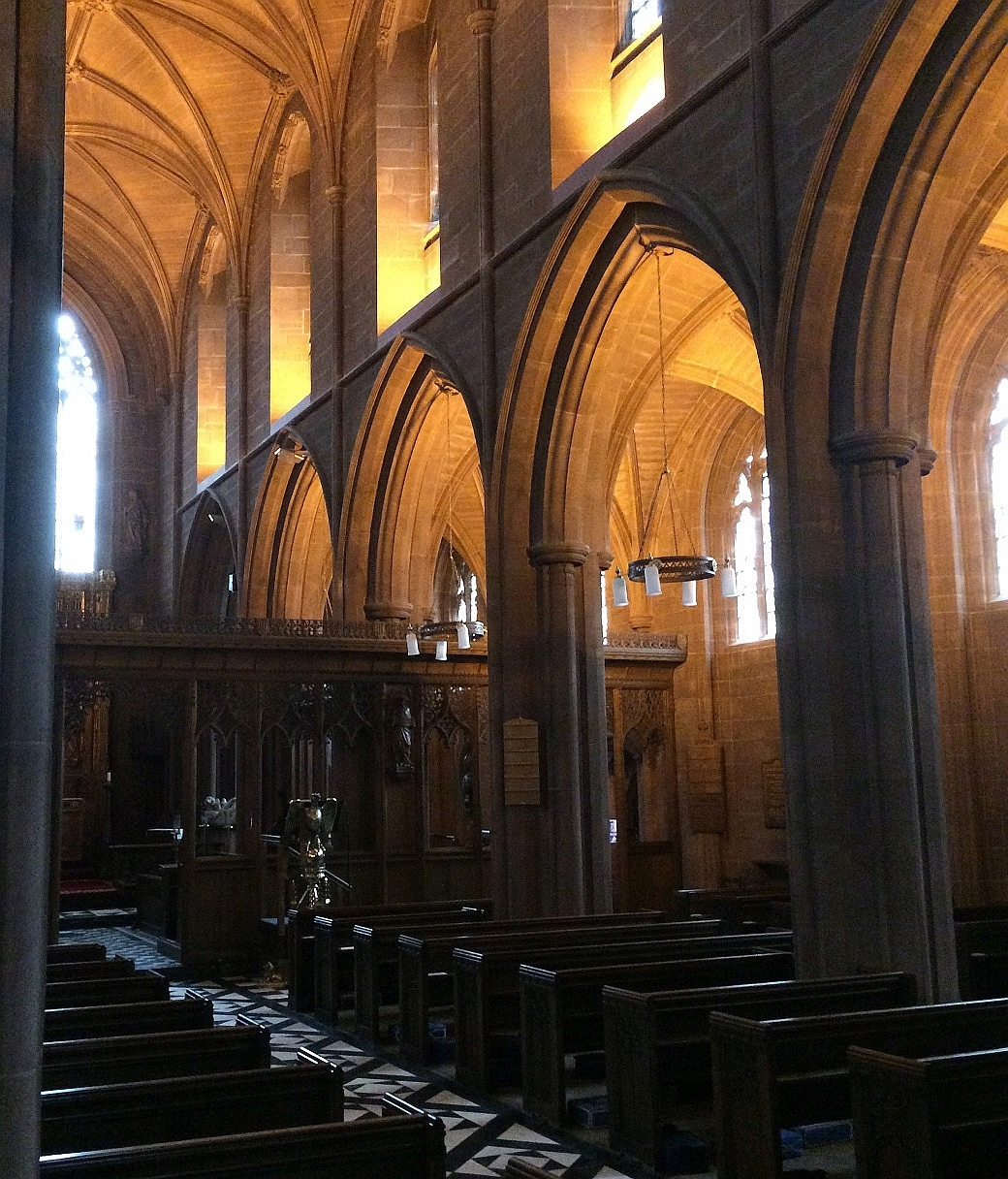
The nave, looking south-east

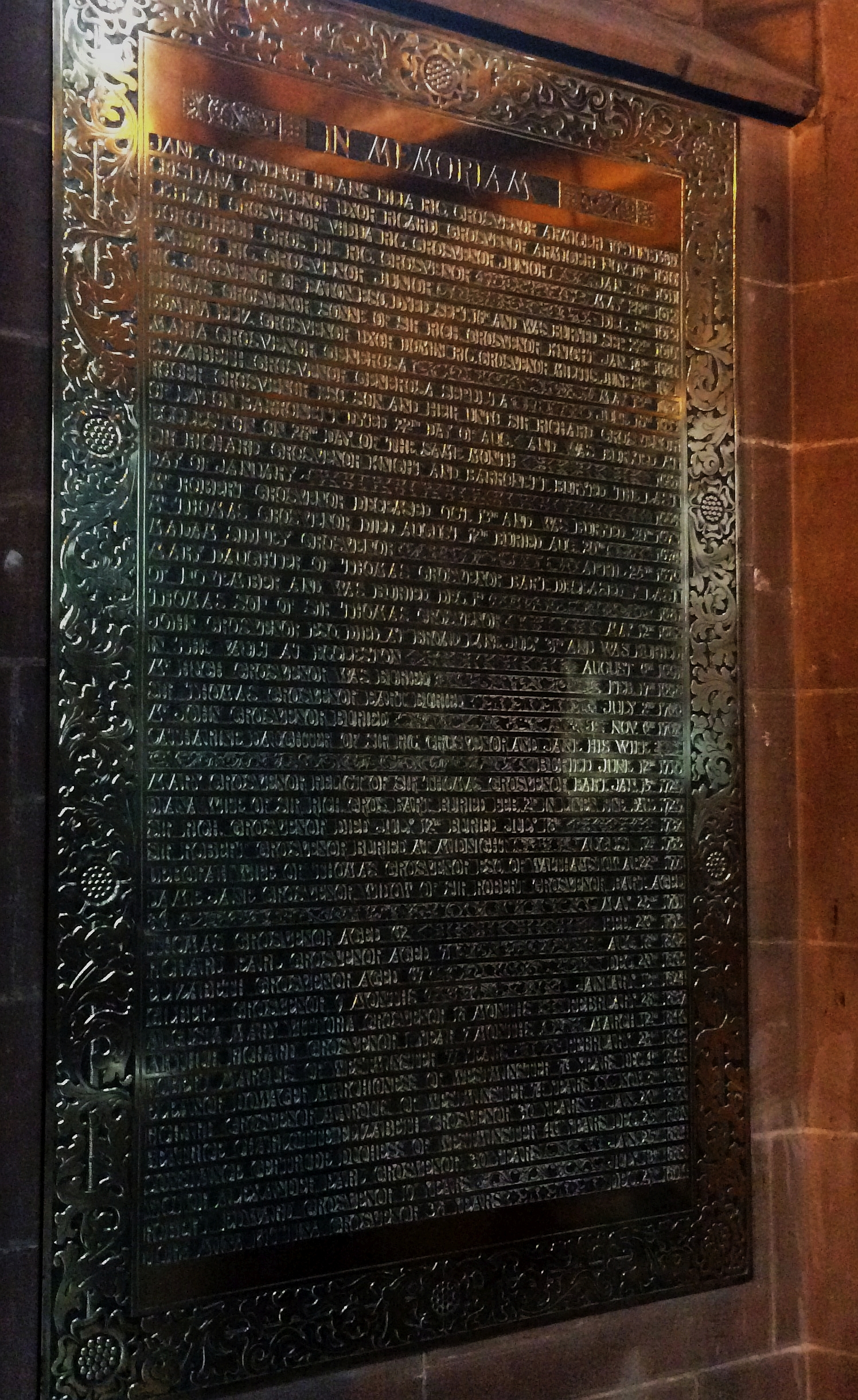
Tablet in the north aisle with list of Grosvenors buried in the old church (now part of the Old Churchyard)

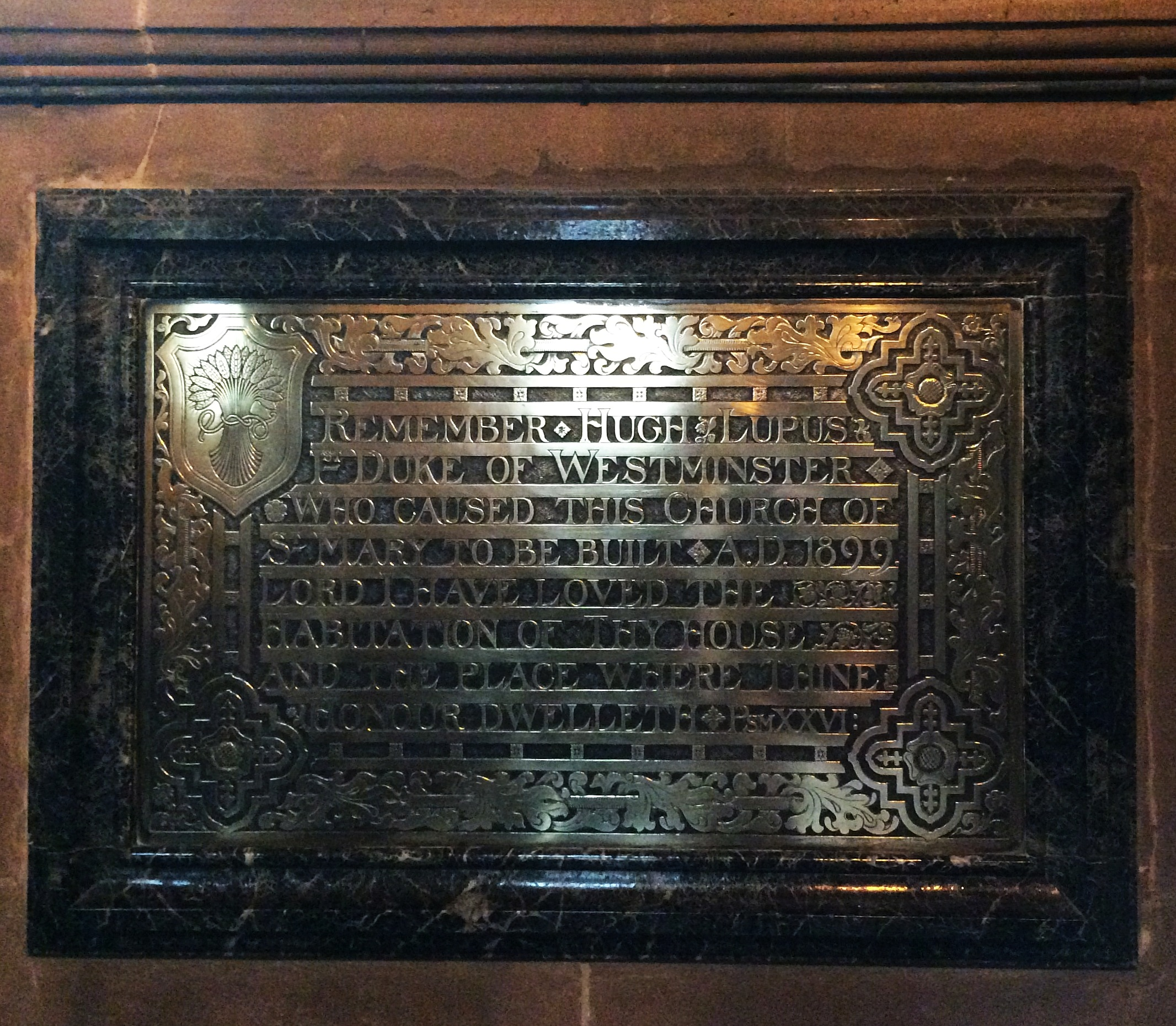
Tablet commemorating the foundation of the church by the 1st Duke of Westminster

==== South aisle and Grosvenor Chapel ====
The east end of the south aisle, next to the church's chancel, is occupied by the Grosvenor Chapel. Above its altar are the carved figures of Jesus, Saint Augustine and Saint Paulinus.

Separating the Grosvenor Chapel from the church's chancel is a monument to the memory of the 1st Duke of Westminster dated 1901, which consists of a tomb-chest and canopy designed by Bodley with an effigy by Farmer and Brindley, sculpted by Léon-Joseph Chavalliaud. Opposite, on the Grosvenor Chapel's south wall, is a bronze bust to the 2nd Duke as well as a memorials to Captain Lord Hugh William Grosvenor, who was killed in the First World War, the 3rd, 4th and 5th Dukes of Westminster. The Grosvenor Chapel has two accesses: a door to the churchyard and a grille leading into the south aisle.

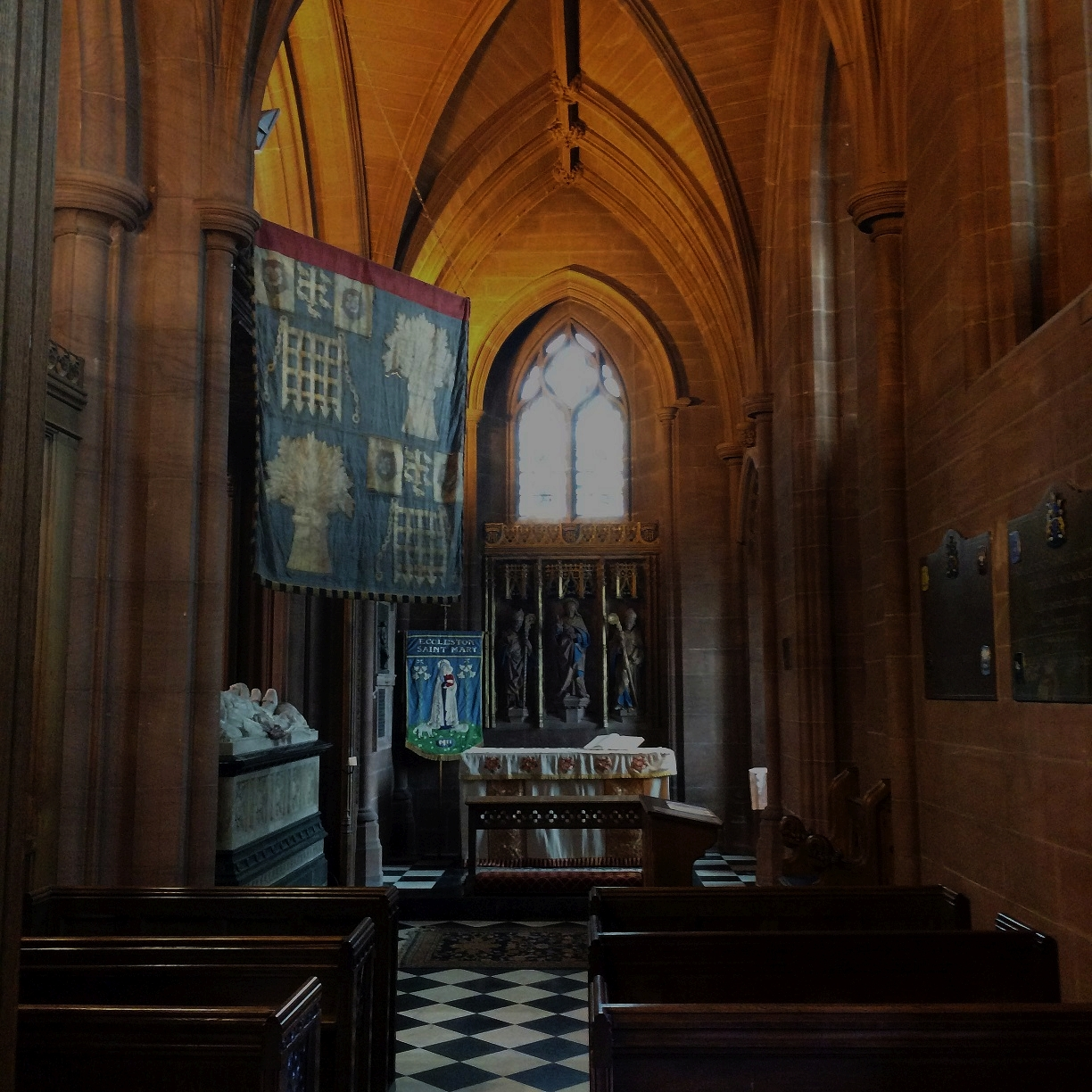
Grosvenor Chapel, interior

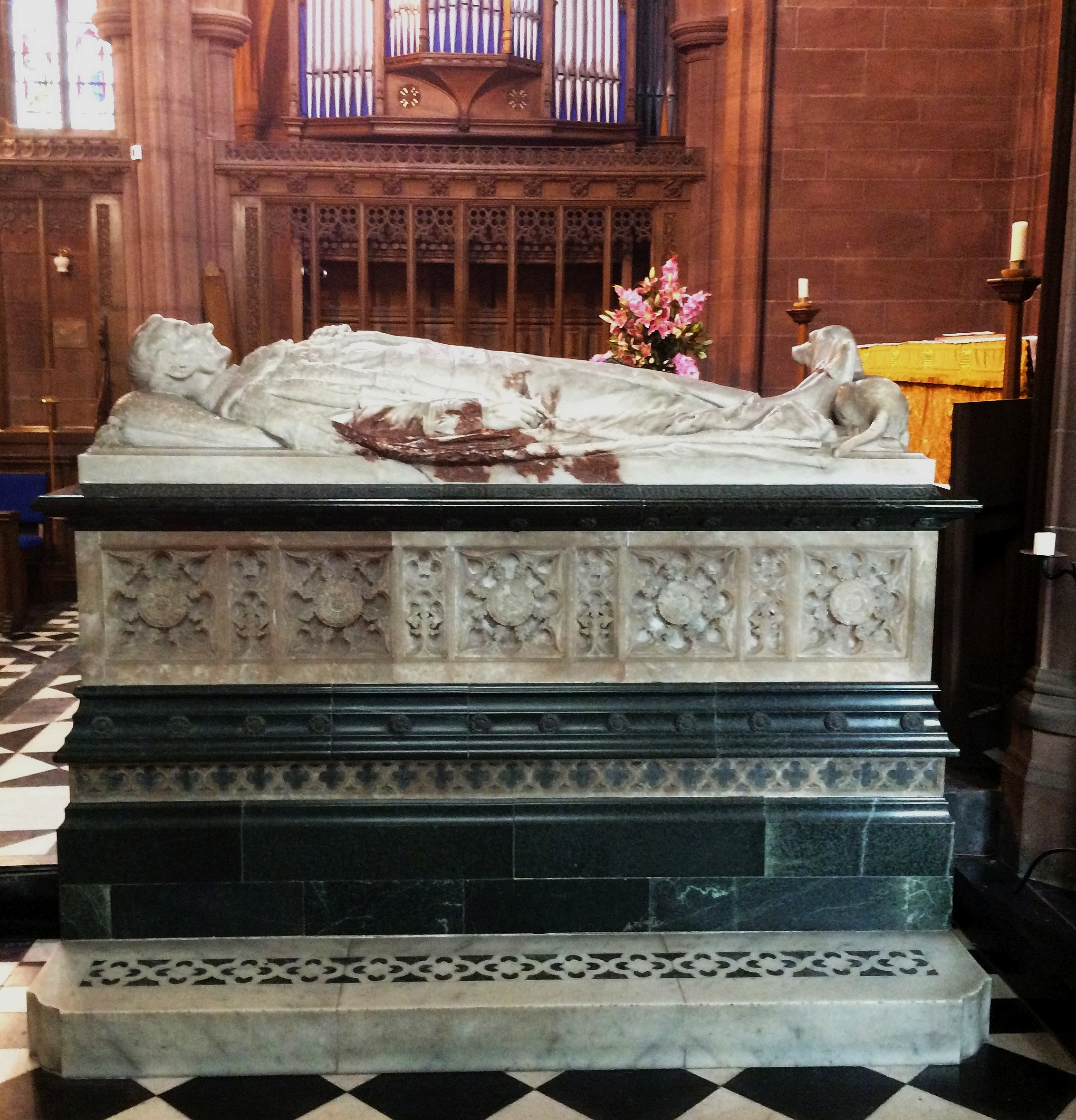
Cenotaph for the 1st Duke of Westminster

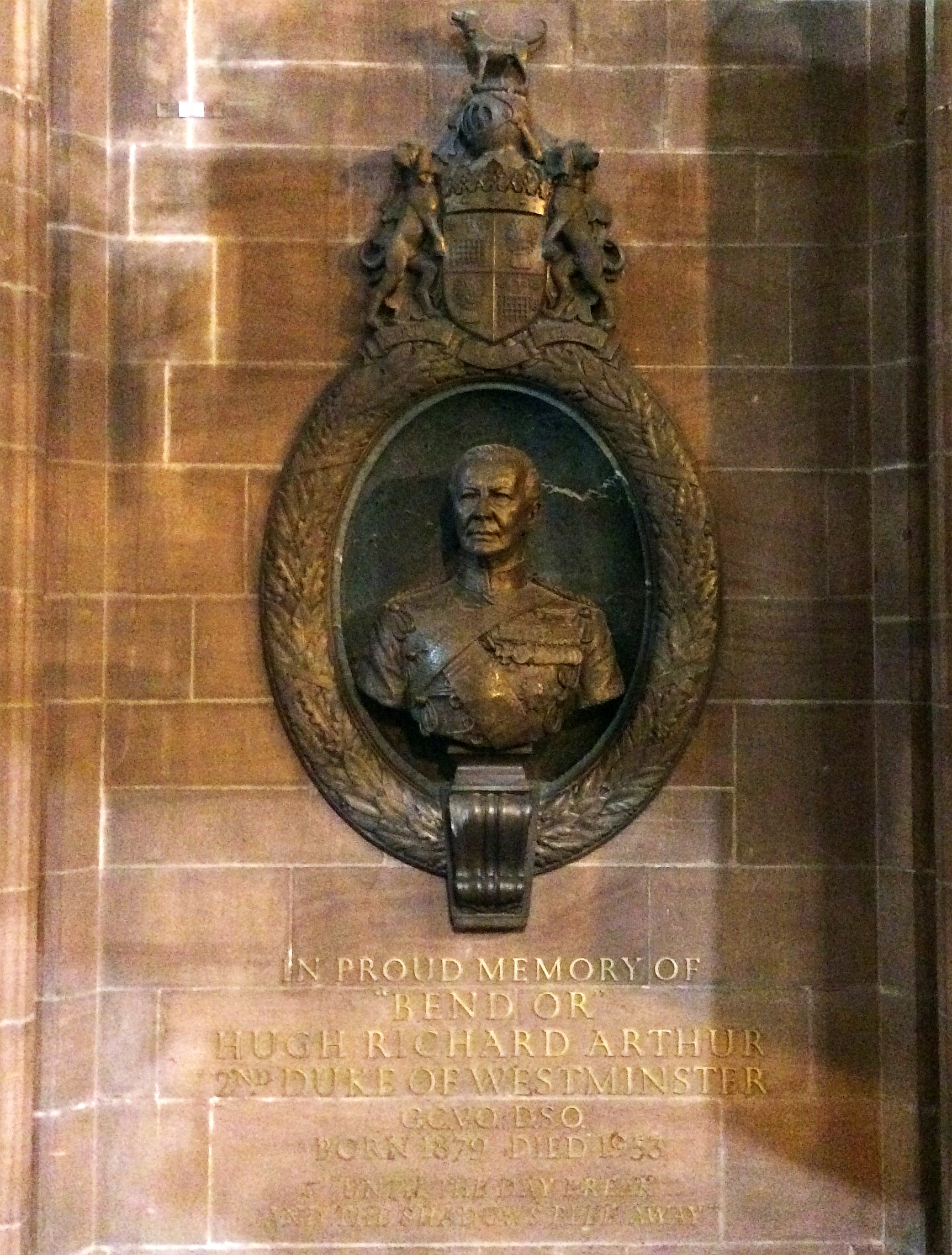
Memorial to the 2nd Duke of Westminster

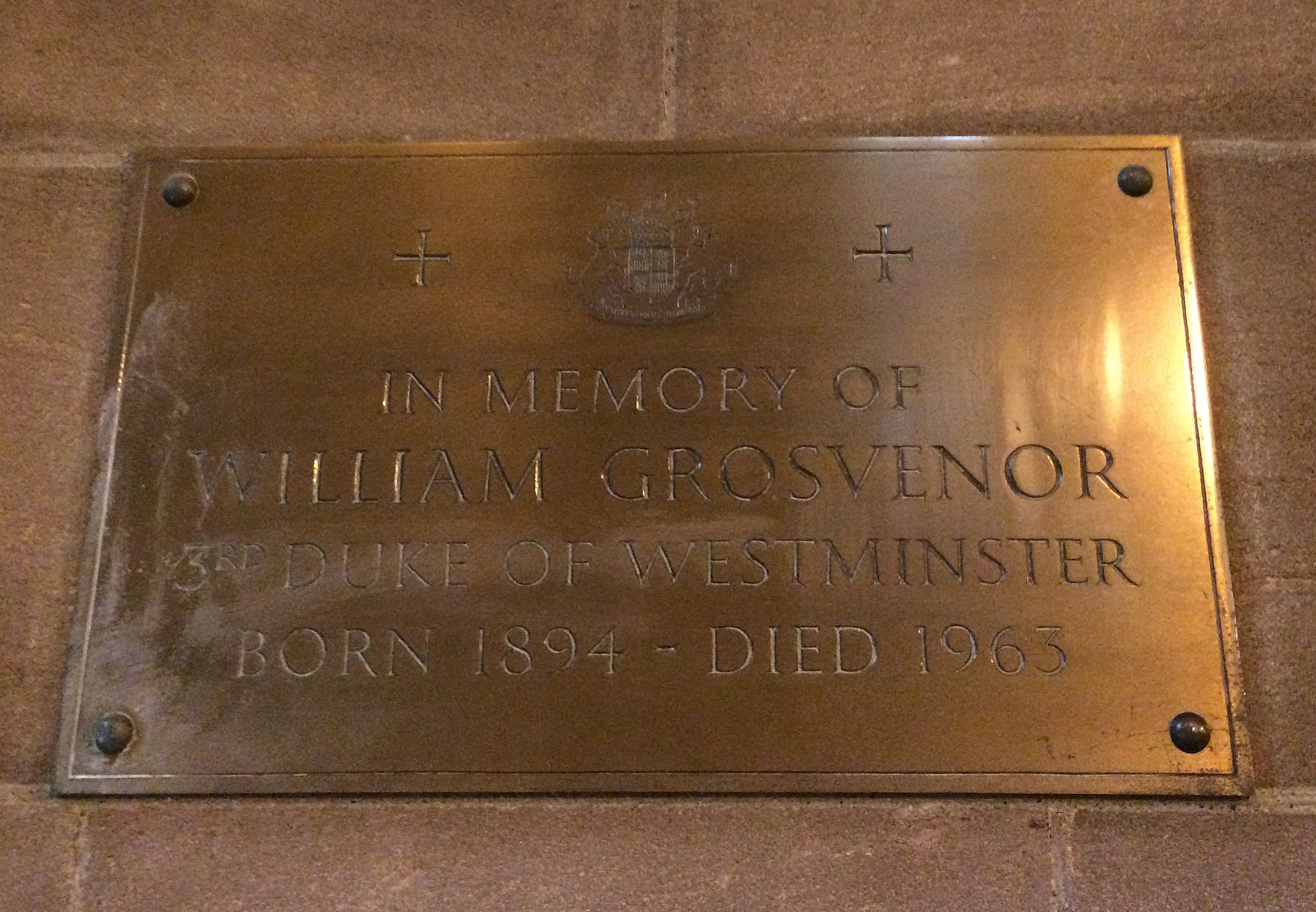
Memorial to the 3rd Duke of Westminster

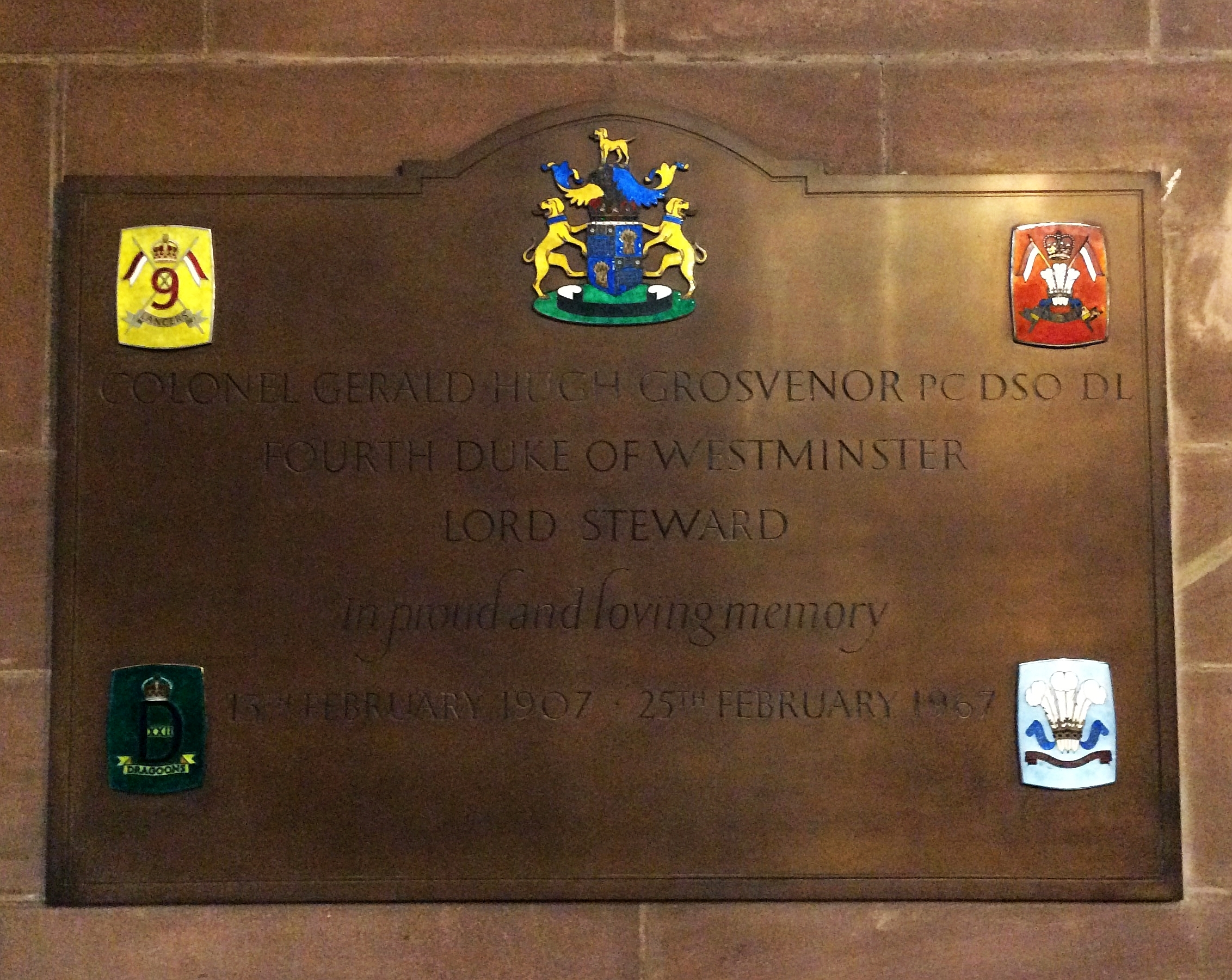
Memorial to the 4th Duke of Westminster

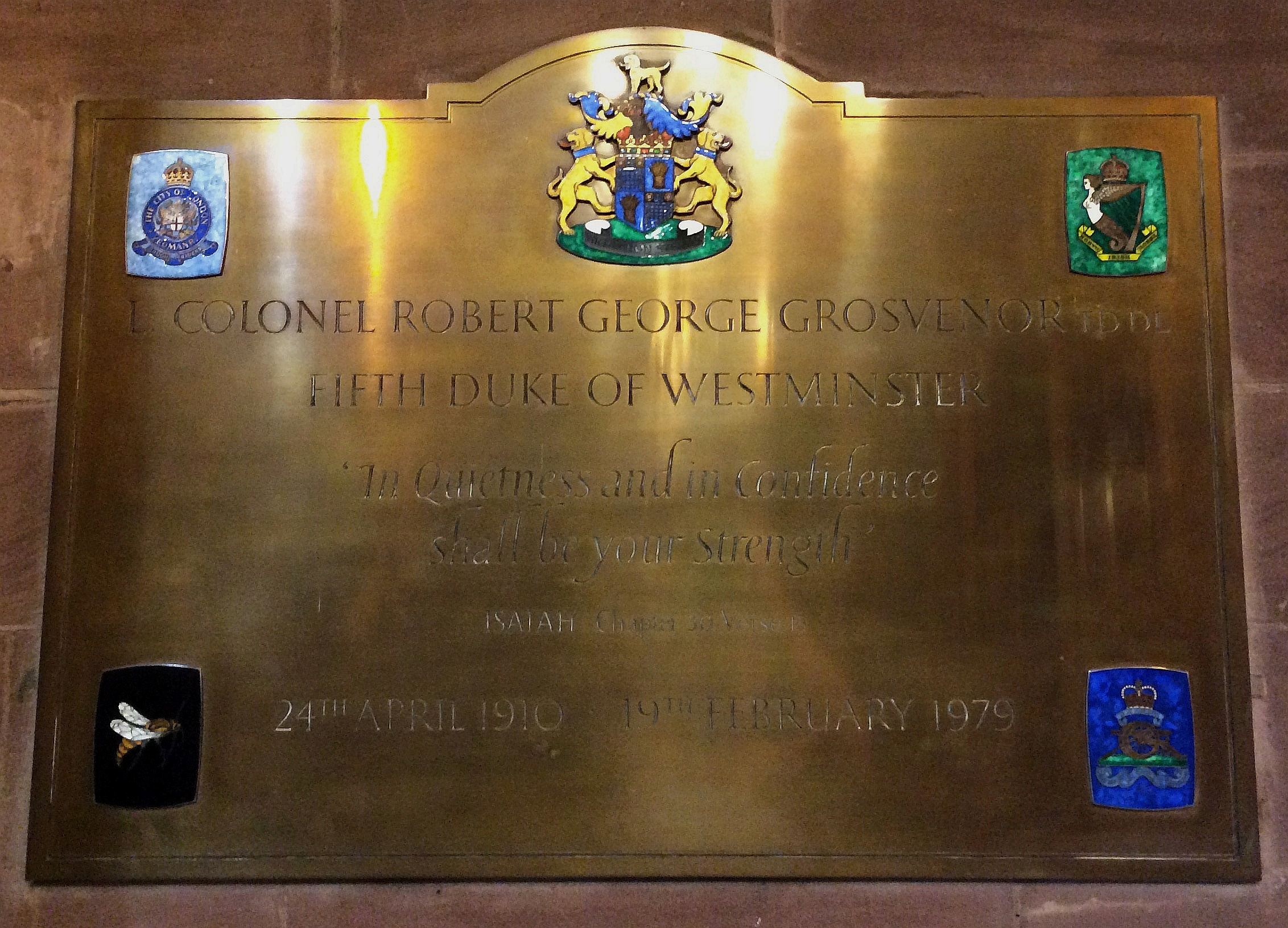
Memorial to the 5th Duke of Westminster

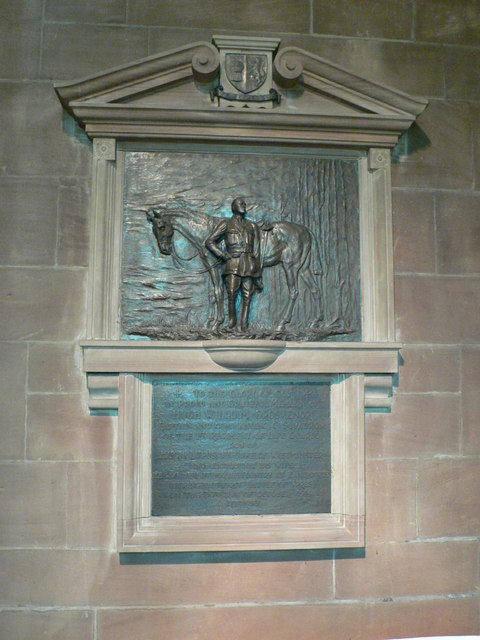
Memorial to Captain Lord Hugh William Grosvenor

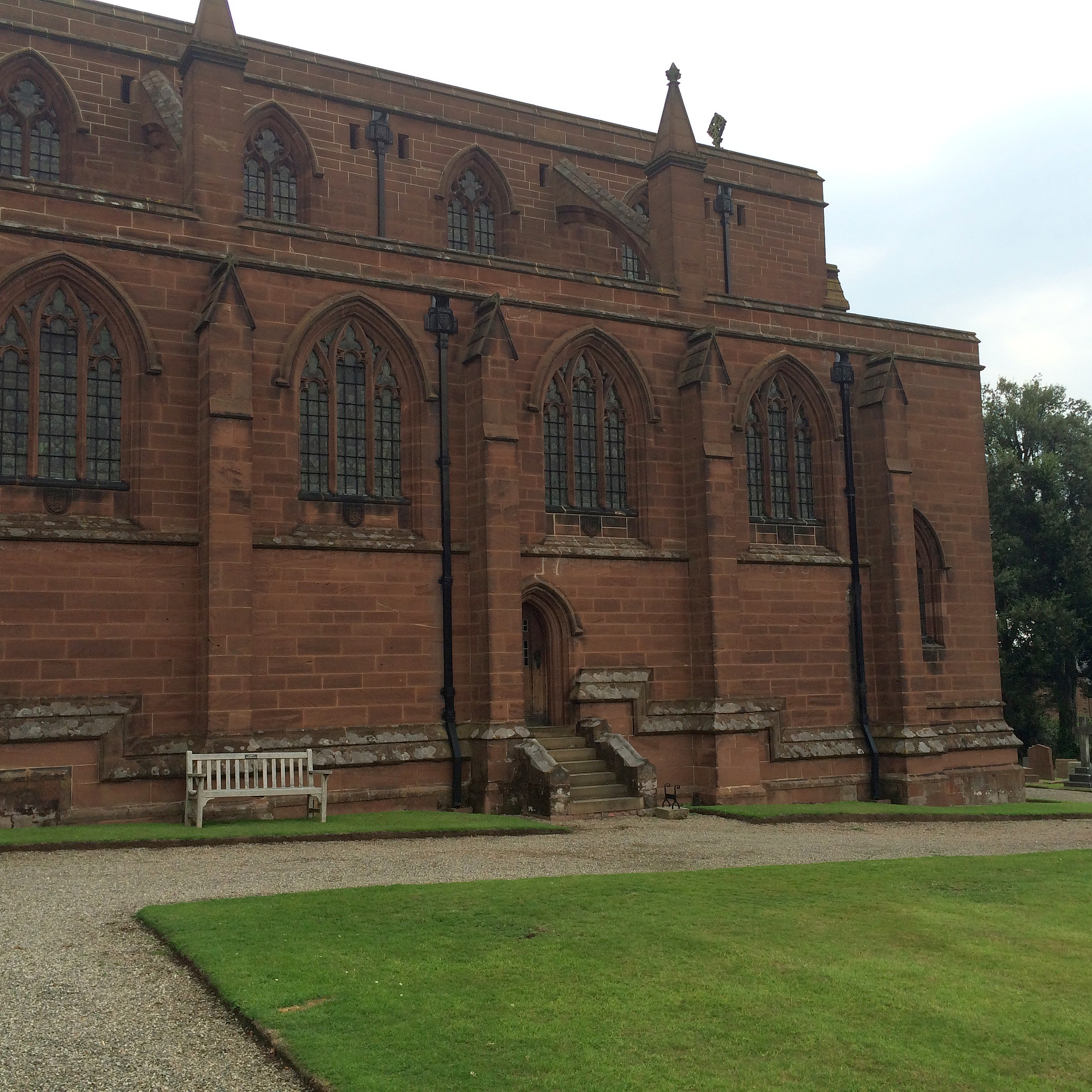
Grosvenor Chapel, exterior

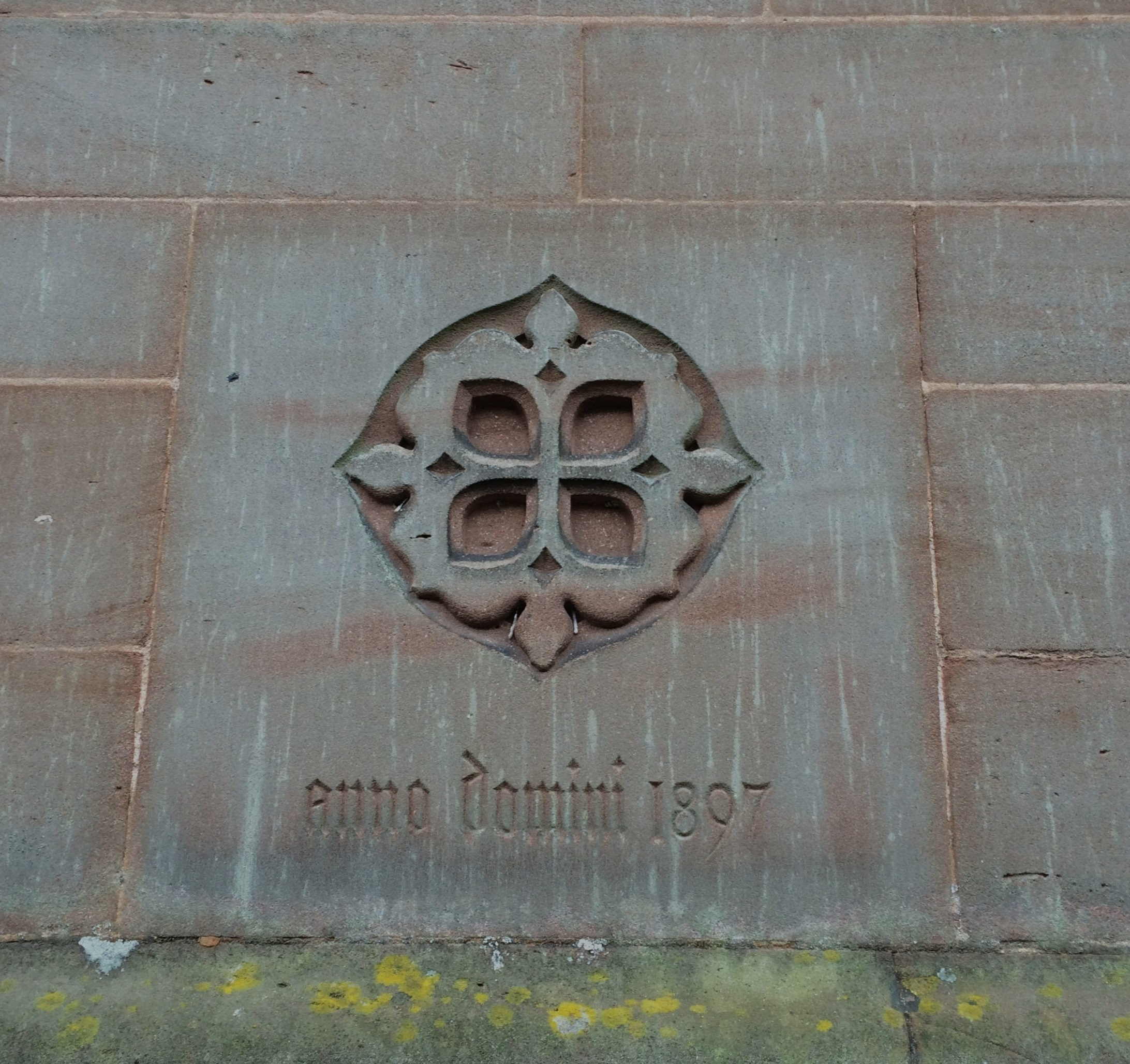
Dedication stone on the eastern facade

==== Tower and baptistry ====
In the tower there is a ring of eight bells which were cast by John Taylor & Co in 1899.

Under the tower is the baptistry with a font. The font is made from Thessaly marble, and has a lifting oak cover decorated with the carvings of eight saints.

In the baptistry is part of a memorial to the Grosvenor family dated 1624 that has been moved from the old church.

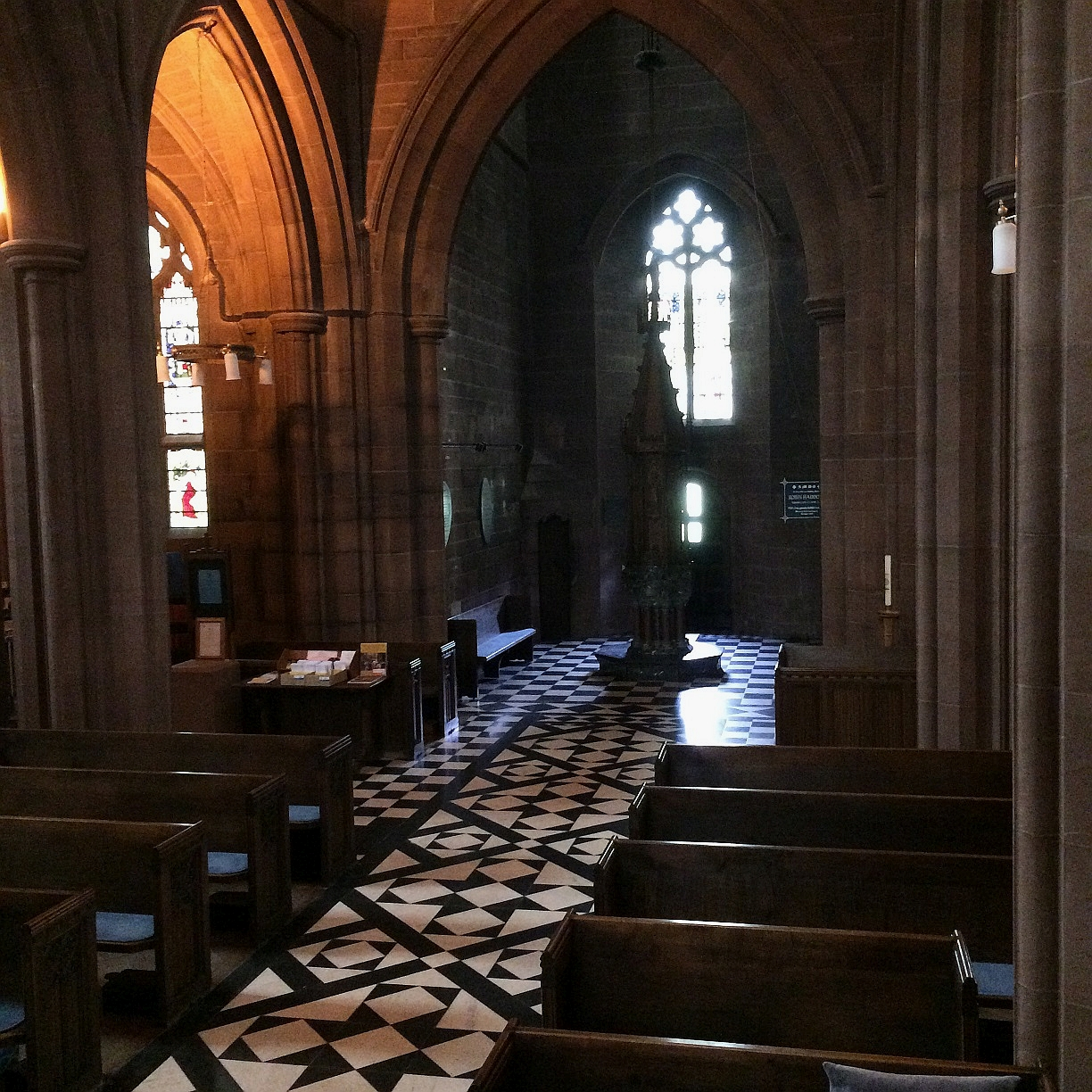
View of the Baptistery

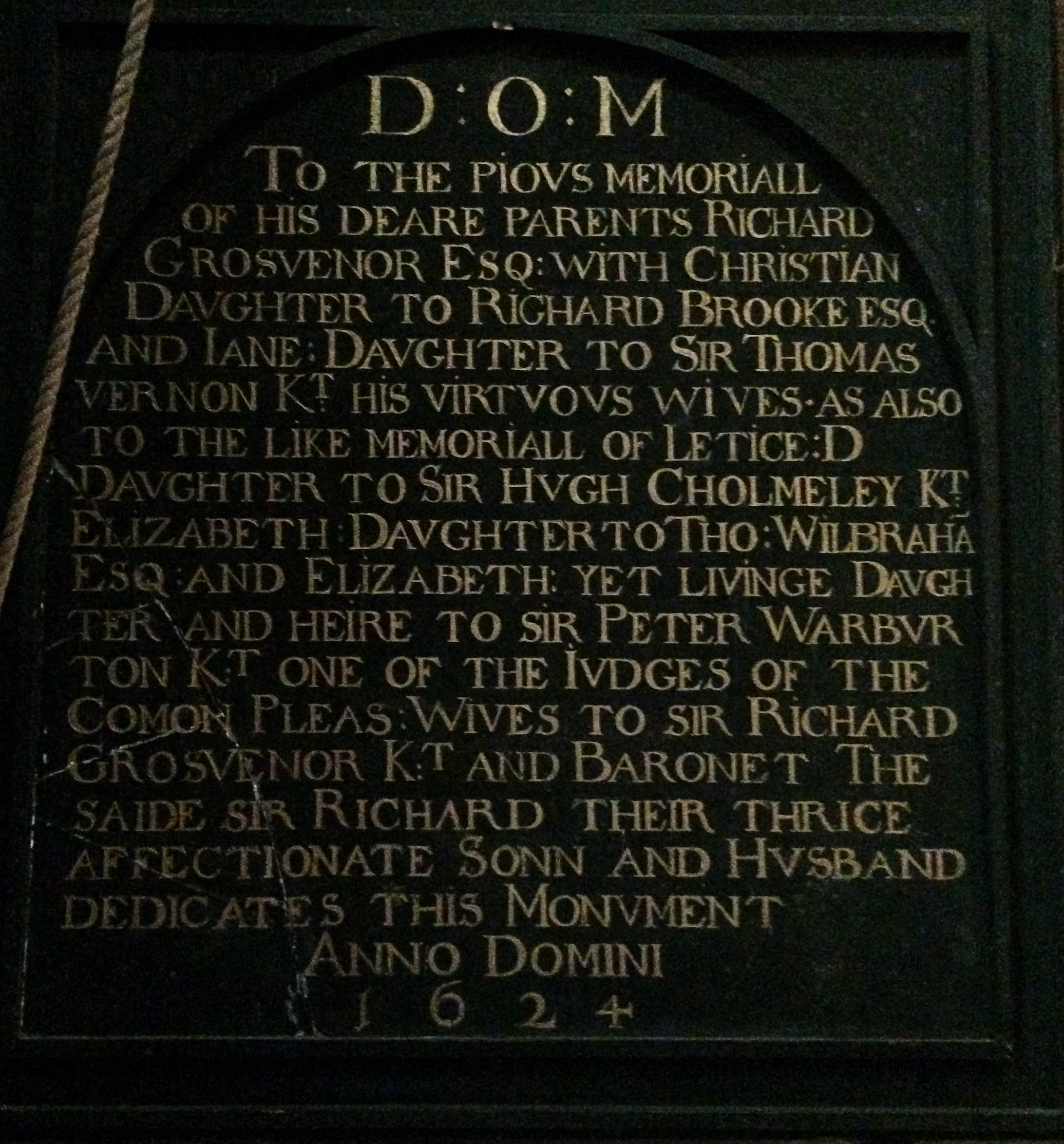
Grosvenor memorial (1624) in the Baptistery

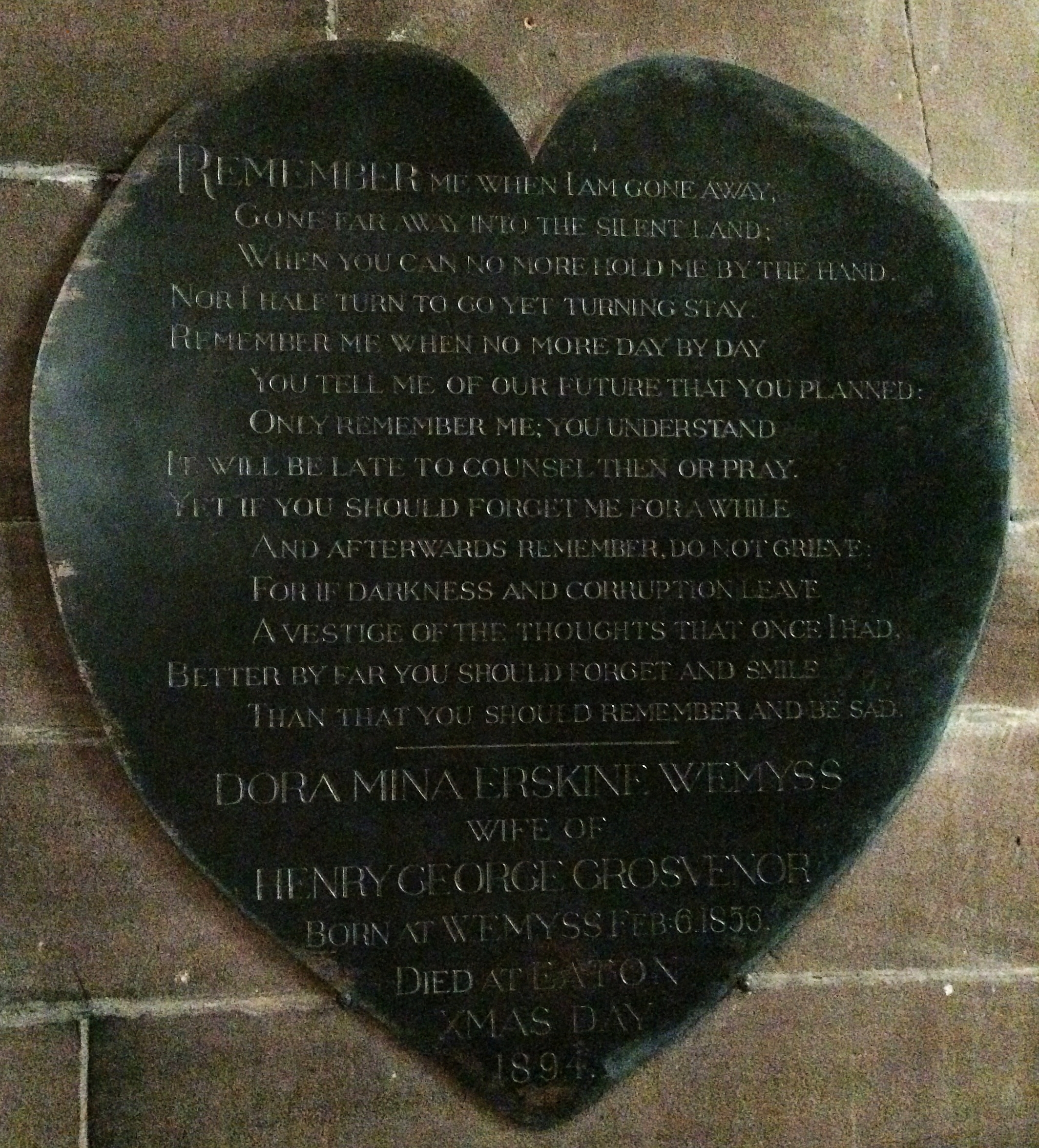
Grosvenor memorial (1894) in the Baptistery

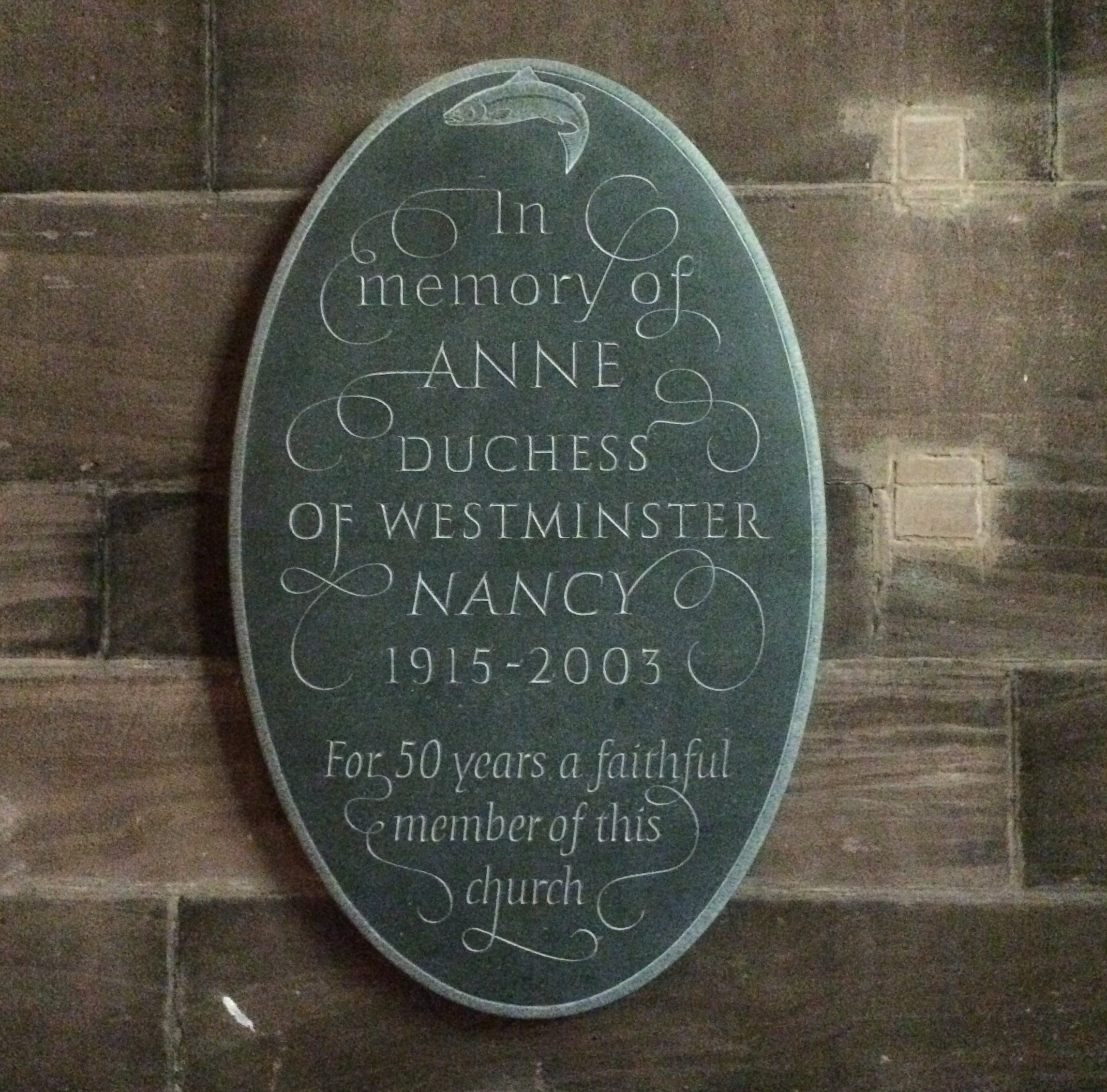
Grosvenor memorial (2003) in the Baptistery

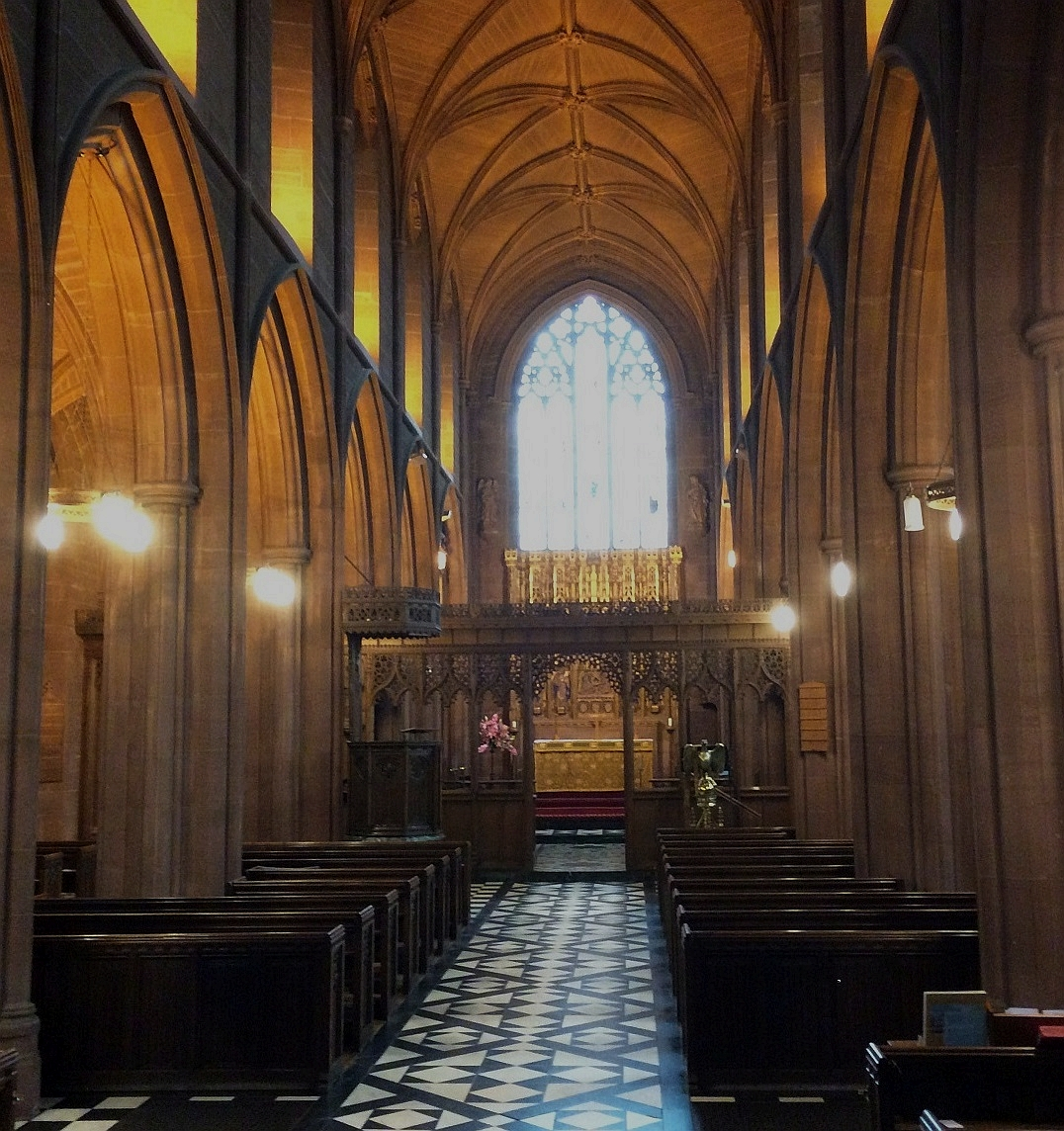
The nave, looking east towards chancel

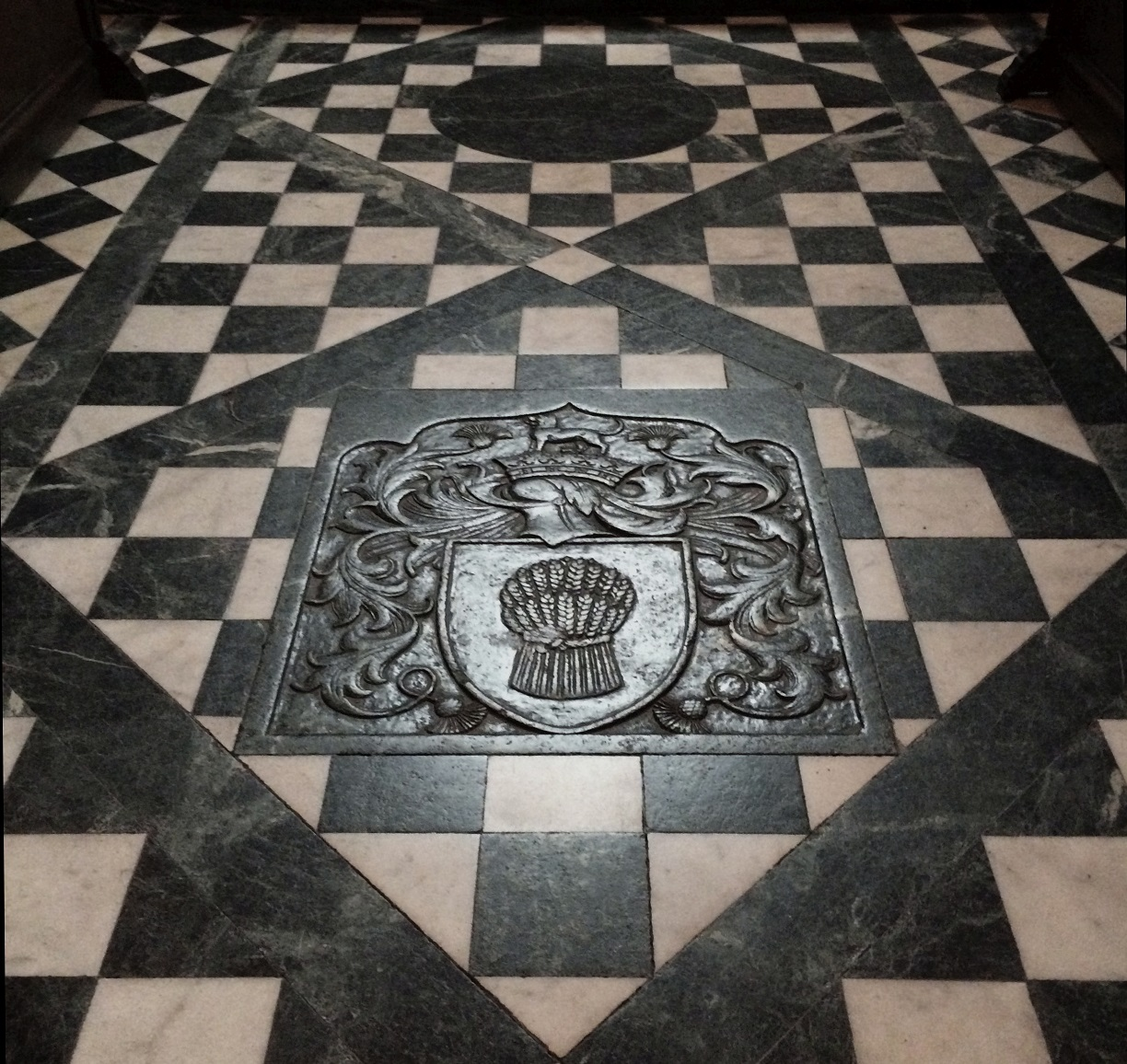
Floor of the chancel with Grosvenor arms

==== Other features ====
The authors of the Buildings of England series were impressed by the furnishings of the church, in particular the reredoses by Farmer and Brindley, the chancel screens, the organ case and the bench ends. All the stained glass is by Burlison and Grylls.

== Precincts ==
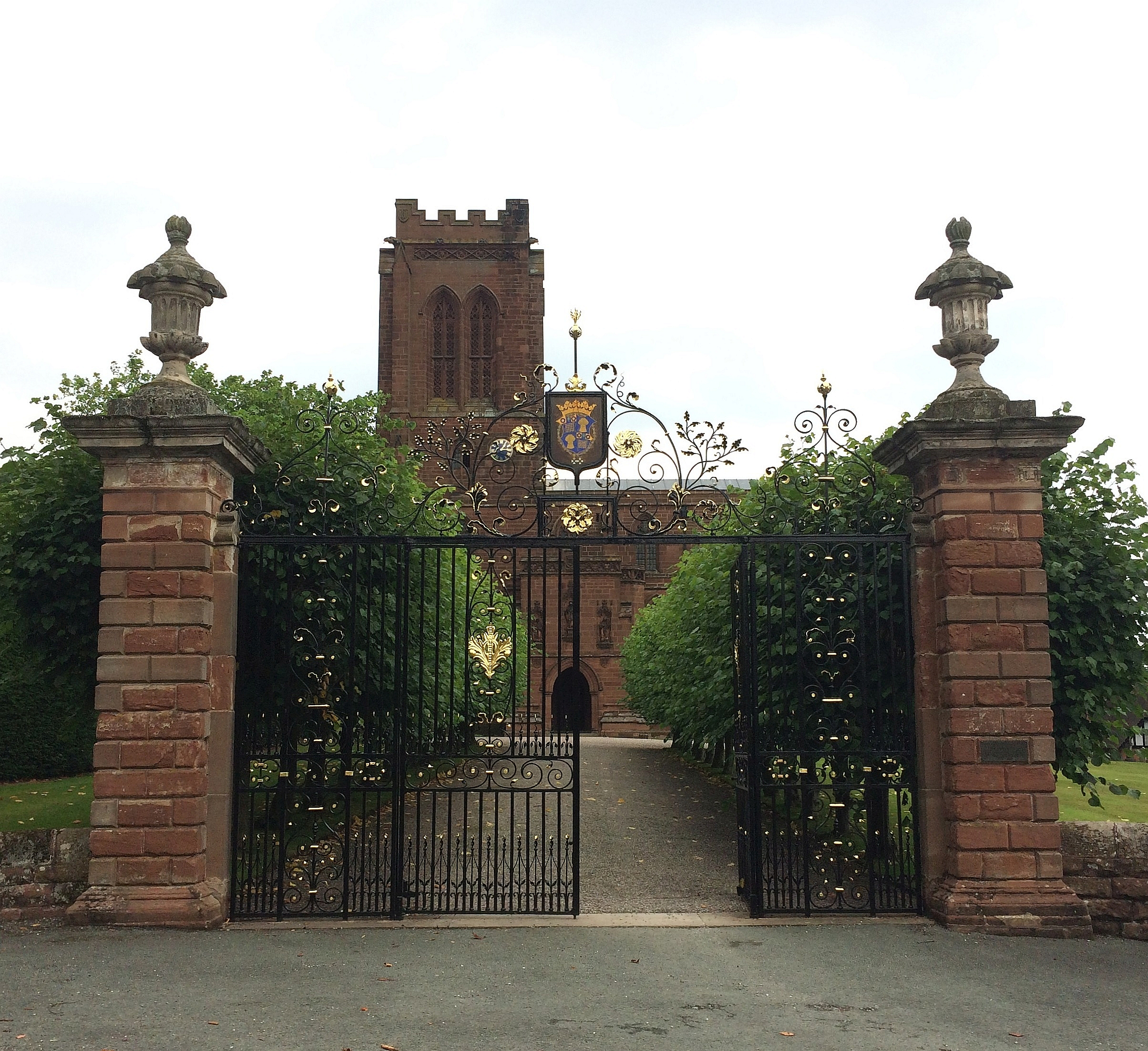
Wrought-iron gates on Church Road

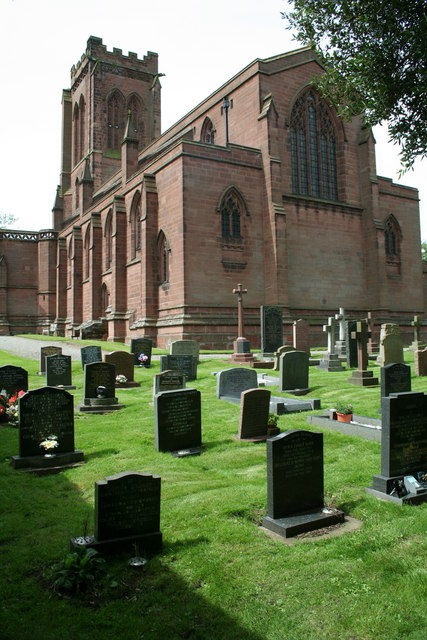
The 'new' churchyard at St Mary's

St Mary's Church is accessed from Church Road through a set of wrought-iron gates bearing the Duke of Westminster's coat of arms. These gates date from the early 18th century and were originally at Emral Hall, Flintshire. They were made by the Davies Bros. An avenue of lime trees leads from these gates to the south entrance of the church. Most of the enclosure around St Mary's Church is covered by lawns, although the section immediately east of the church and north of the Rectory is used as parish cemetery.

A footpath leads from St Mary's Church past the Old Coaching House to the Old Churchyard, which is about 100 metres (330 ft) northeast of the church. The walls and gates between Old Church Lane and the Old Churchyard are Grade II listed.

== Old Churchyard ==
=== Description ===
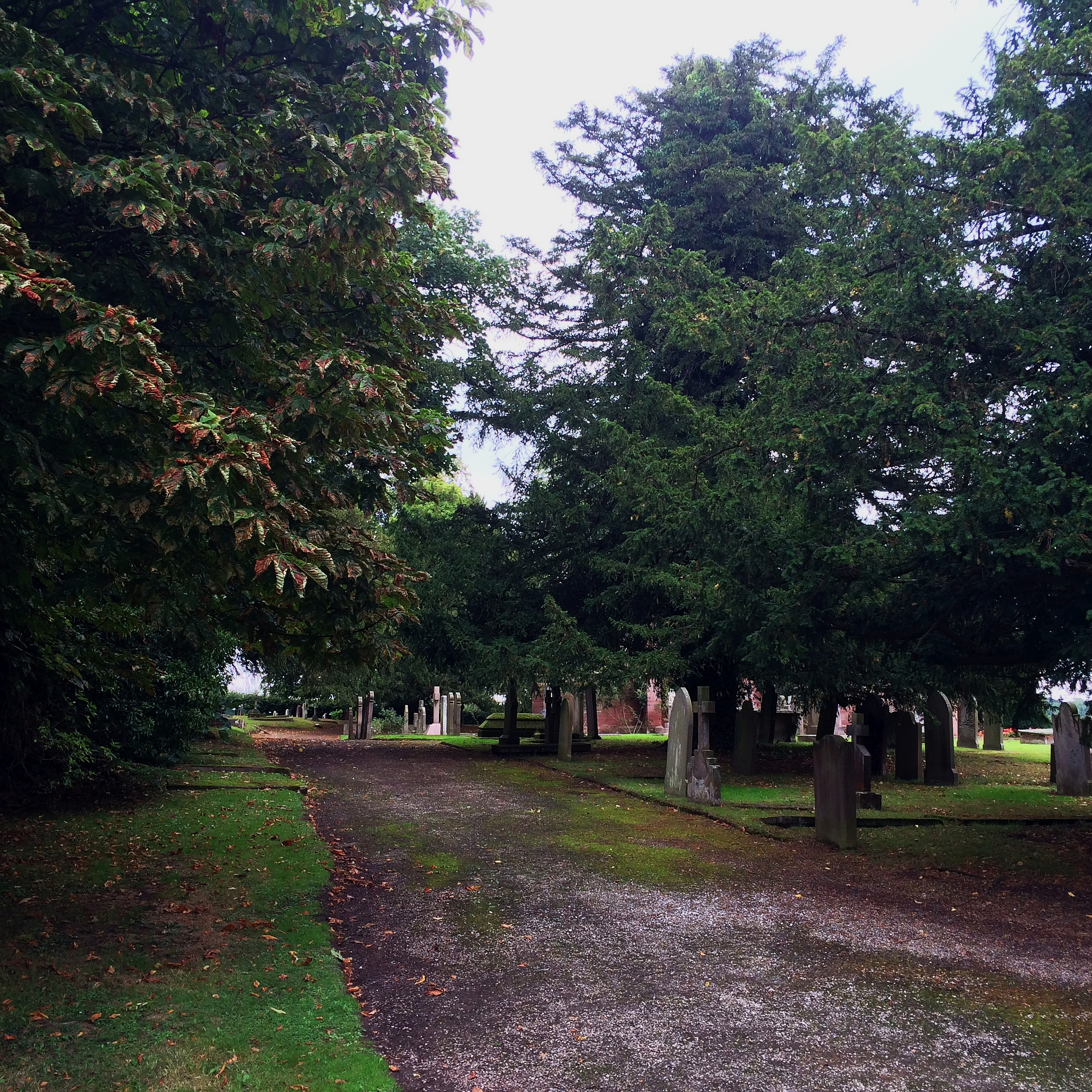
View of the Old Churchyard

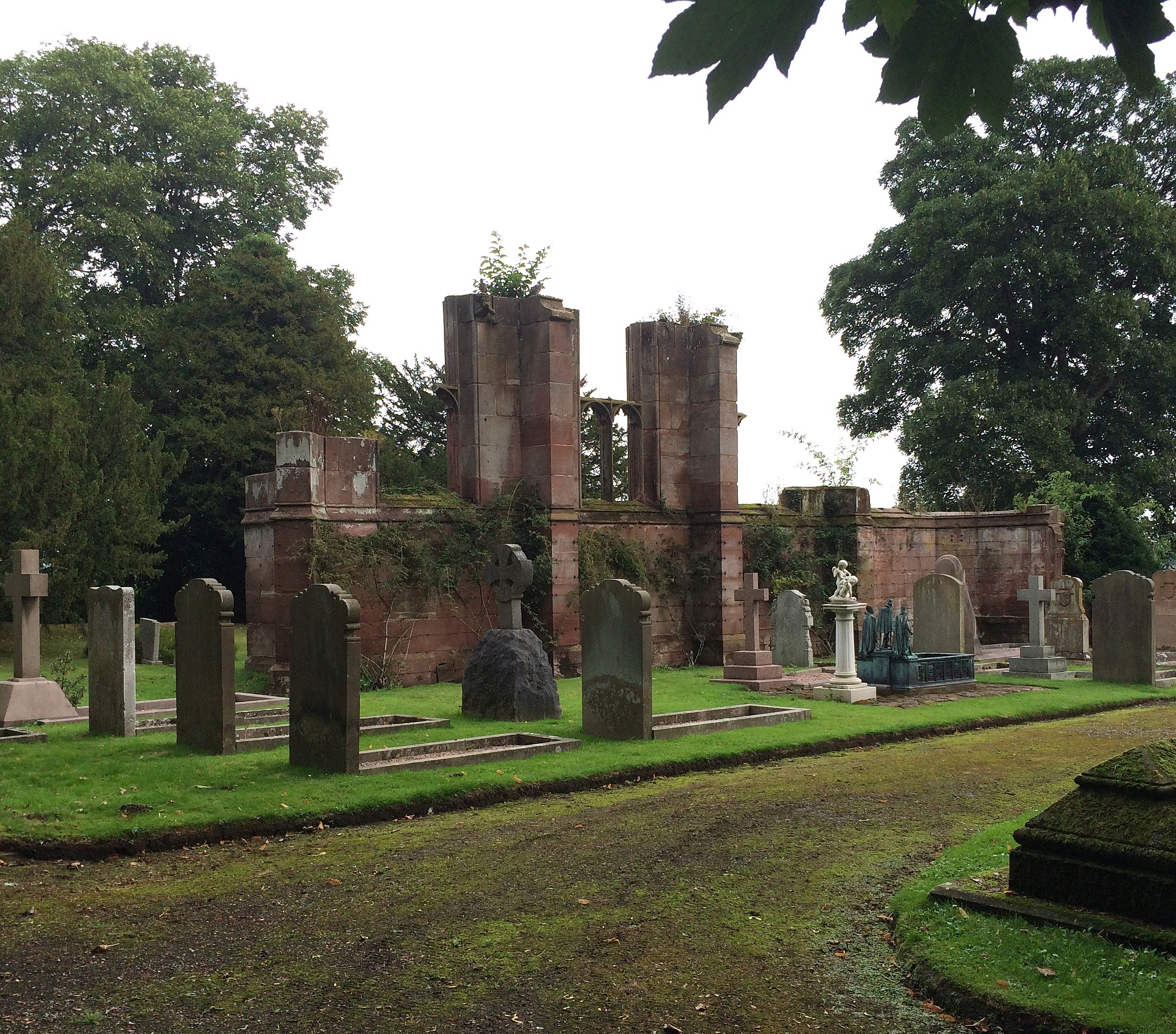
Remaining wall of Eccleston's old parish church and graves of the Grosvenor family, Dukes of Westminster

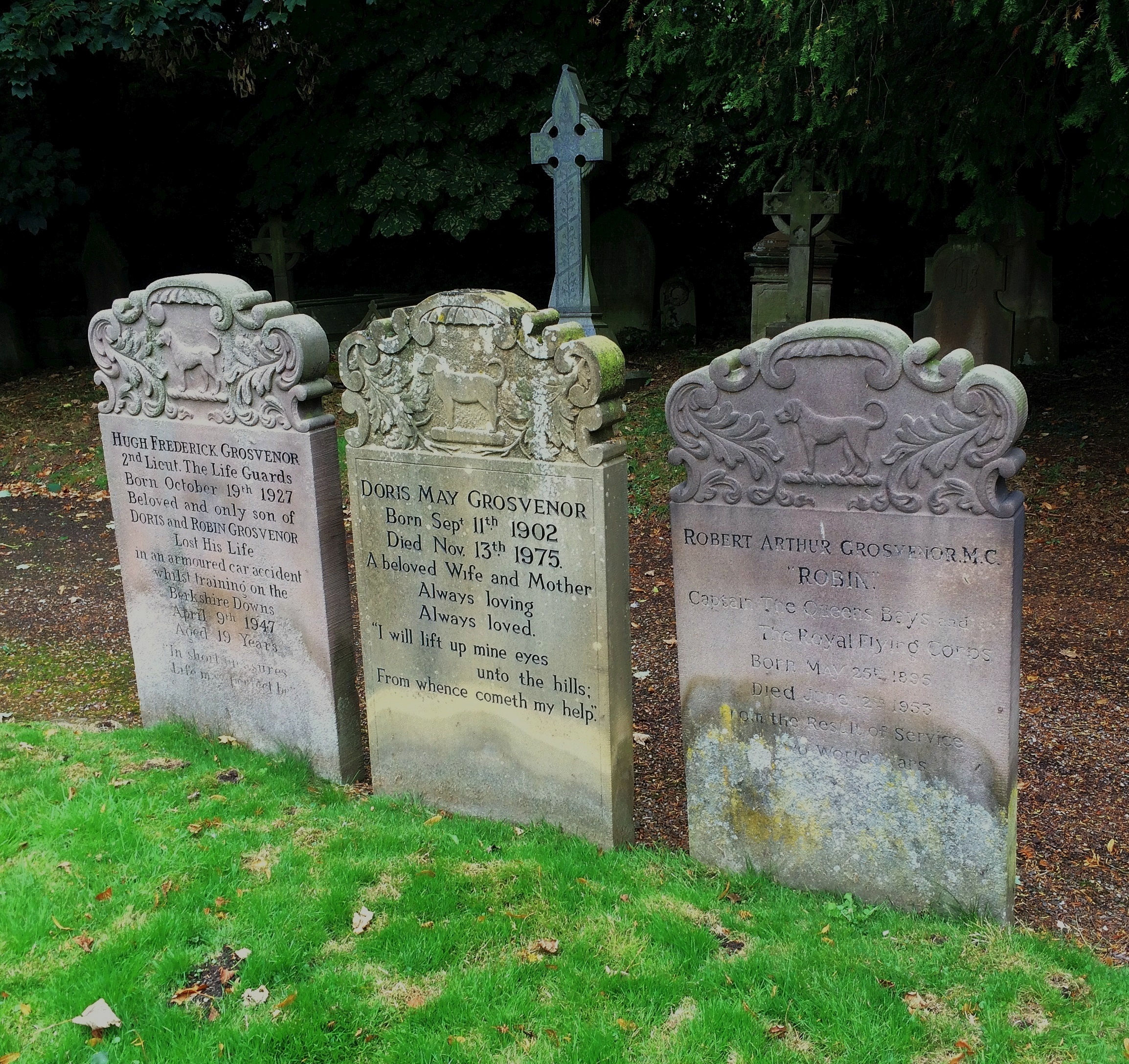
Grosvenor family graves: Hugh Frederick (1927–1947), his mother Doris (1902–1975) and his father Robin (1895–1953), a grandson of the 1st Duke of Westminster

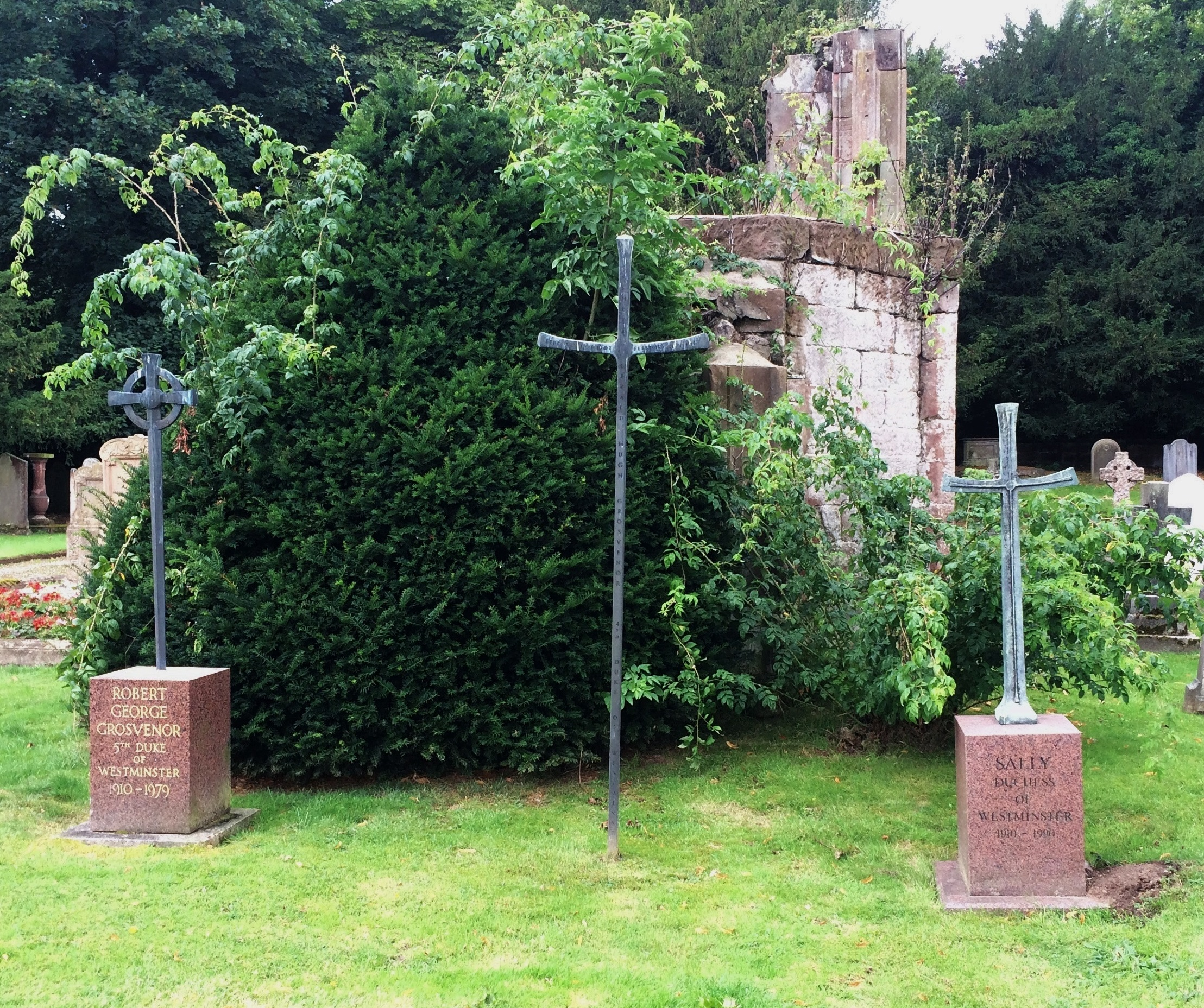
Eccleston's old parish church with the graves of the 5th Duke, the 4th Duke and the latter's wife Sally

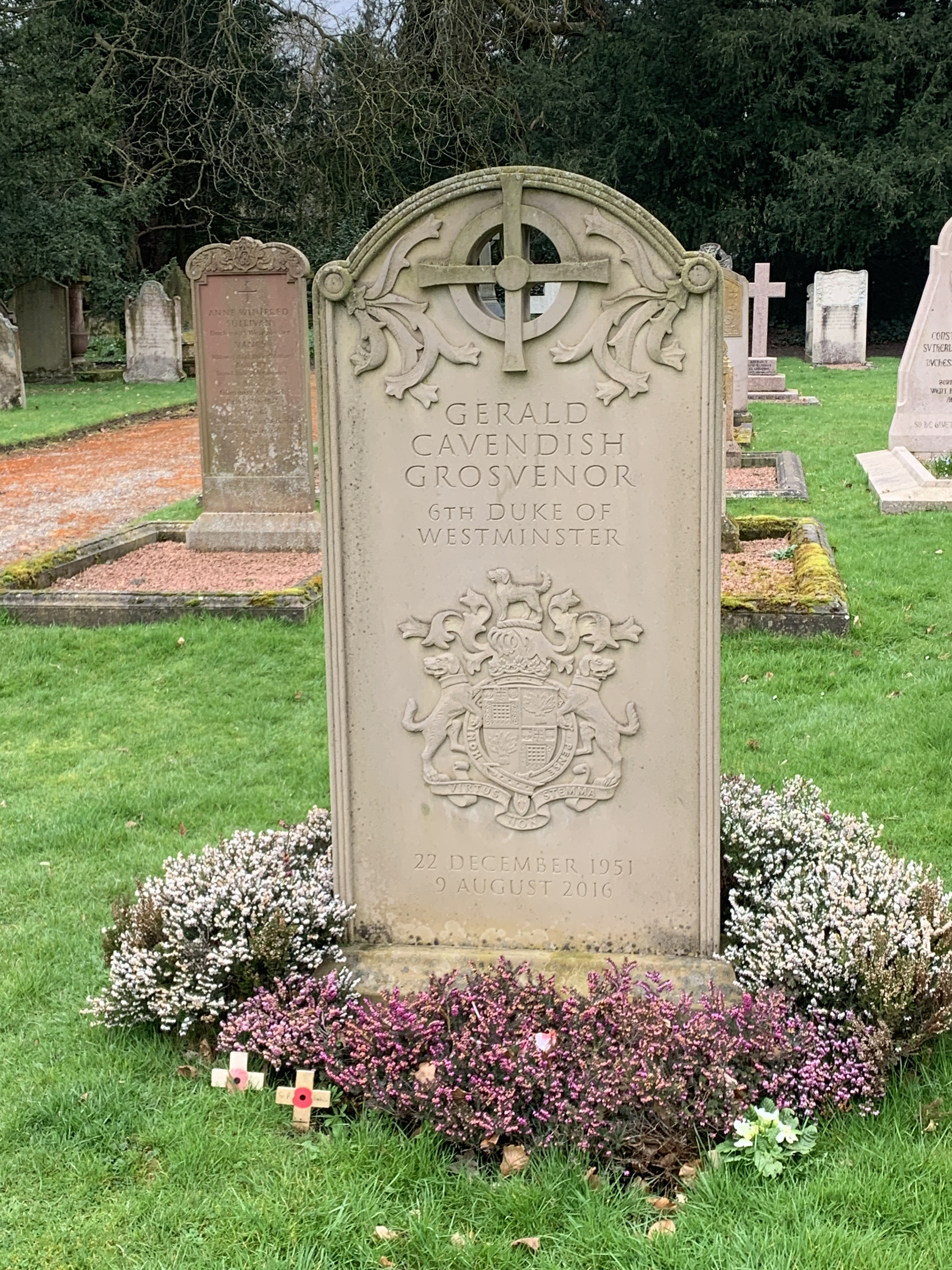
Monument to the 6th Duke

With its many tall trees, the Old Churchyard has features of a woodland. In its centre are the remains of Porden's old parish church, which consist of a sandstone wall with the lower parts of two windows measuring about 60 feet (18 m) long by 18 feet (5 m) high. It is designated as a Grade II listed building.

Along the south side of the remaining wall of Porden's old church are the graves of the Dukes of Westminster, other members of the Grosvenor family and their relatives. A square enclosure in the northeast part of the Old Churchyard, now covered with gravel and surrounded by a low wall with crosses in the corners, marks the spot where the Grosvenor family vault was located within Porden's church. The names of those ancestors of the Dukes of Westminster who are interred here are recorded on a brass plaque inside the present church building. The gravestone of Edward George Hugh, Earl Grosvenor (1904–1909), by Detmar Blow and Fernand Billerey, sculpted by Emile Madeline, is a Grade II listed building.

The churchyard contains ten CWGC registered war graves. Of these, seven are from World War I and three from World War II. There is also the grave of a Victoria Cross recipient, Alfred Ernest Ind.

=== Burials and monuments ===
==== Westminster plot along old wall ====
- The Rev. John Gibbons-Longueville, rector of Eccleston 1854 to 1880, and his wife
- Beatrice Charlotte Elizabeth (née Vesey, died 1876), daughter of 3rd Viscount de Vesci, wife of Lord Richard Grosvenor, brother of the 1st Duke of Westminster
- Constance Gertrude (née Leveson-Gower, 1834–1880), daughter of the 2nd Duke of Sutherland, wife of the 1st Duke of Westminster
- Lord Robert Edward Grosvenor (1869–1888), son of the 1st Duke of Westminster
- Dora Mina (née Erskine-Wemyss, 1856–1894), wife of Lord Henry George Grosvenor (1861–1914) and mother of the 3rd Duke of Westminster
- Hugh Grosvenor, 1st Duke of Westminster (1825–1899) (ashes, cremated in Woking Crematorium)
- Lord Edward George Hugh Grosvenor (known as Earl Grosvenor, 1904–1909), only son of the 2nd Duke of Westminster
- Richard Grosvenor, 1st Baron Stalbridge (1837–1912), brother of the 1st Duke of Westminster
- Lord Henry George Grosvenor (1861–1914), son of the 1st Duke and father of the 3rd Duke
- Lord Arthur Hugh Grosvenor (1860–1929), son of the 1st Duke of Westminster
- Lord Edward Arthur Grosvenor (1892–1929), son of the 1st Duke of Westminster
- Lord Gerald Richard Grosvenor (1874–1940), son of the 1st Duke of Westminster
- Katherine Caroline (née Cavendish, 1857–1941), daughter of the 2nd Baron Chesham, widow of the 1st Duke of Westminster
- Hugh Frederick Grosvenor (1927–1947), son of Robert Arthur "Robin" Grosvenor
- Robert Arthur "Robin" Grosvenor (1895–1953), son of Lord Arthur Hugh Grosvenor (1860–1929)
- Hugh Grosvenor, 2nd Duke of Westminster (1879–1953)
- Lady Mary Cavendish Grosvenor (1883–1959), daughter of the 1st Duke of Westminster. She married firstly Henry Crichton, Viscount Crichton (1872–1914), and was the mother of 5th Earl Erne; and secondly, Colonel the Hon. Algernon Francis Stanley (1874–1962), a son of the 16th Earl of Derby
- William Grosvenor, 3rd Duke of Westminster (1894–1963)
- Lady Dorothy Alice Margaret Grosvenor (1890–1966), daughter of Lord Henry George Grosvenor (1861–1914)
- Gerald Grosvenor, 4th Duke of Westminster (1907–1967)
- Constance Edwina (née Cornwallis-West, 1876−1970), former wife of the 2nd Duke of Westminster
- Doris May (née Wignall, 1902–1975), wife of Robert Arthur "Robin" Grosvenor
- Robert Grosvenor, 5th Duke of Westminster (1910–1979)
- Sally (née Perry, 1909–1990), wife of the 4th Duke of Westminster
- Anne Winifred "Nancy" (née Sullivan, 1915–2003), widow of the 2nd Duke of Westminster
- Gerald Grosvenor, 6th Duke of Westminster (1951–2016)

==== Site of old Grosvenor family vault ====
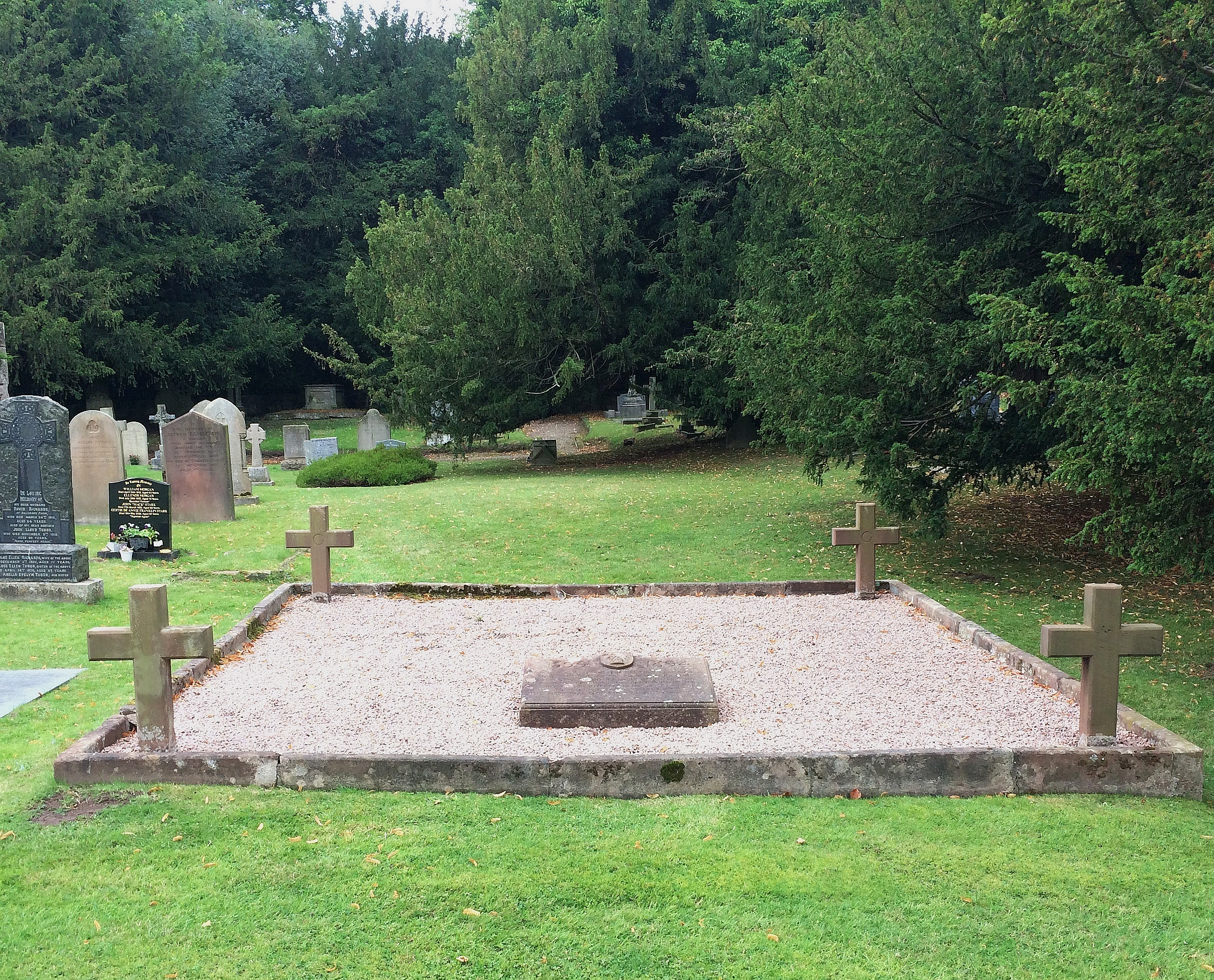
The enclosure which marks the site of the old Grosvenor family vault within the old parish church.

Many ancestors of the Dukes of Westminster, including:

- Sir Richard Grosvenor, 1st Baronet
- Sir Thomas Grosvenor, 3rd Baronet
- Richard Grosvenor, 1st Earl Grosvenor
- Robert Grosvenor, 1st Marquess of Westminster
- Richard Grosvenor, 2nd Marquess of Westminster

A stone tablet in the enclosure (see here) bears the arms of the Grosvenor baronets with the dates 1599 and 1894 and the inscription: "This stone marks the resting place of those members of the Grosvenor family who were buried in a vault under the old church which was demolished in 1900 and who were reinterred in this plot and their names are recorded on the memorial tablet in Eccleston church." As the inscription indicates, the names of those family members buried here are listed on a large brass wall plaque in the north aisle of the church (see here).

==== Elsewhere in the Old Churchyard ====
- Alfred Ernest Ind, VC (1872–1916). He served as a Farrier Sergeant in the Boer War, later worked on the estate of the Duke of Westminster and died in 1916.
- Sir Philip Hay, KCVO (1918–1986), Private Secretary to the Duchess of Kent
- Dame Margaret Katherine Hay, DCVO (née Seymour, 1918–1975), Woman of the Bedchamber to Queen Elizabeth II, granddaughter of Hugh Grosvenor, 1st Duke of Westminster and wife of Sir Philip Hay
- Sir Henry Nelson Clowes, KCVO (1911–1993) and his wife Diana Katherine Kerr (1926–2010), daughter of Major Basil Kerr (1879–1957)
- Major Basil Kerr (1879–1957)
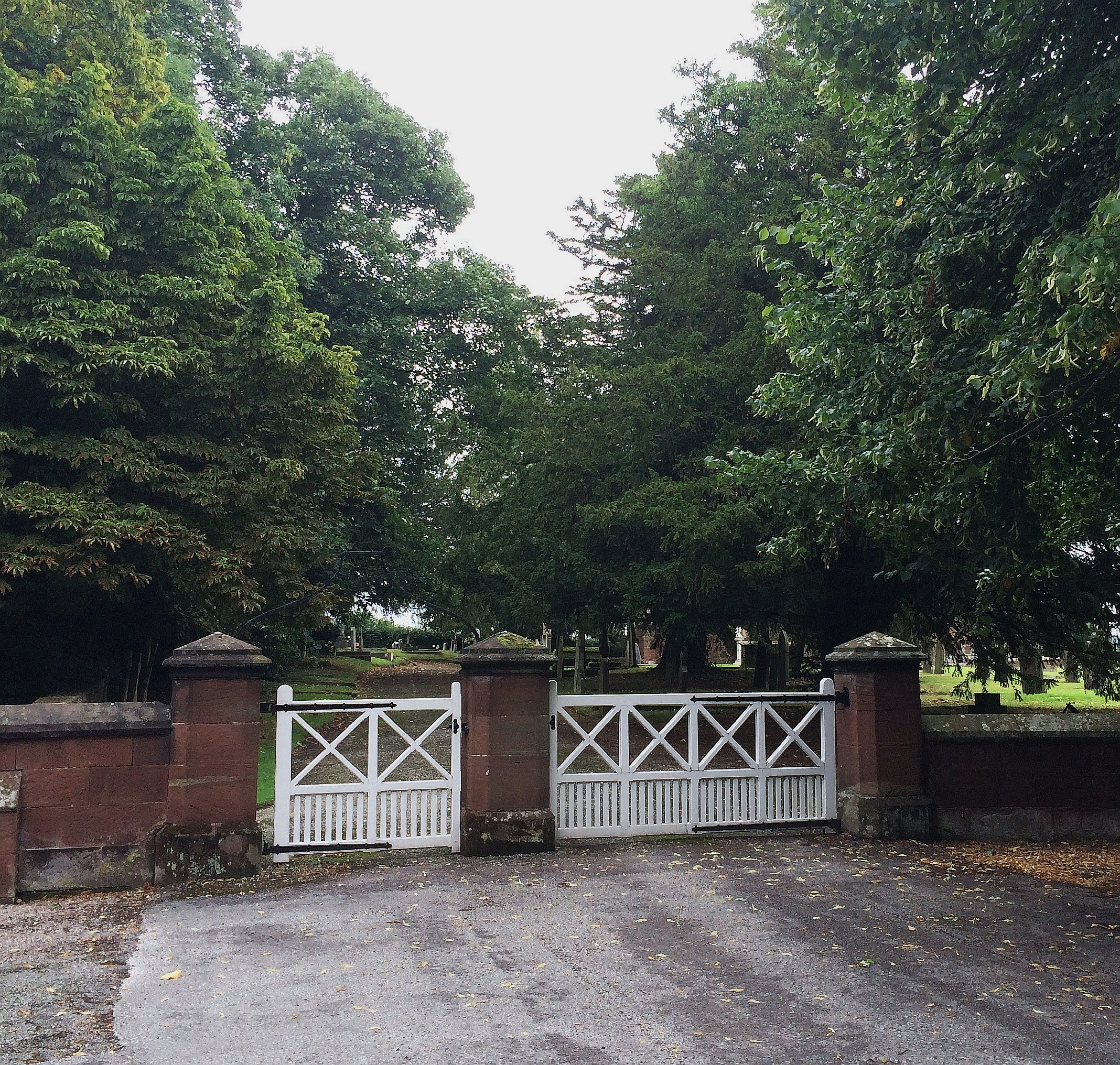
Gates to the Old Churchyard

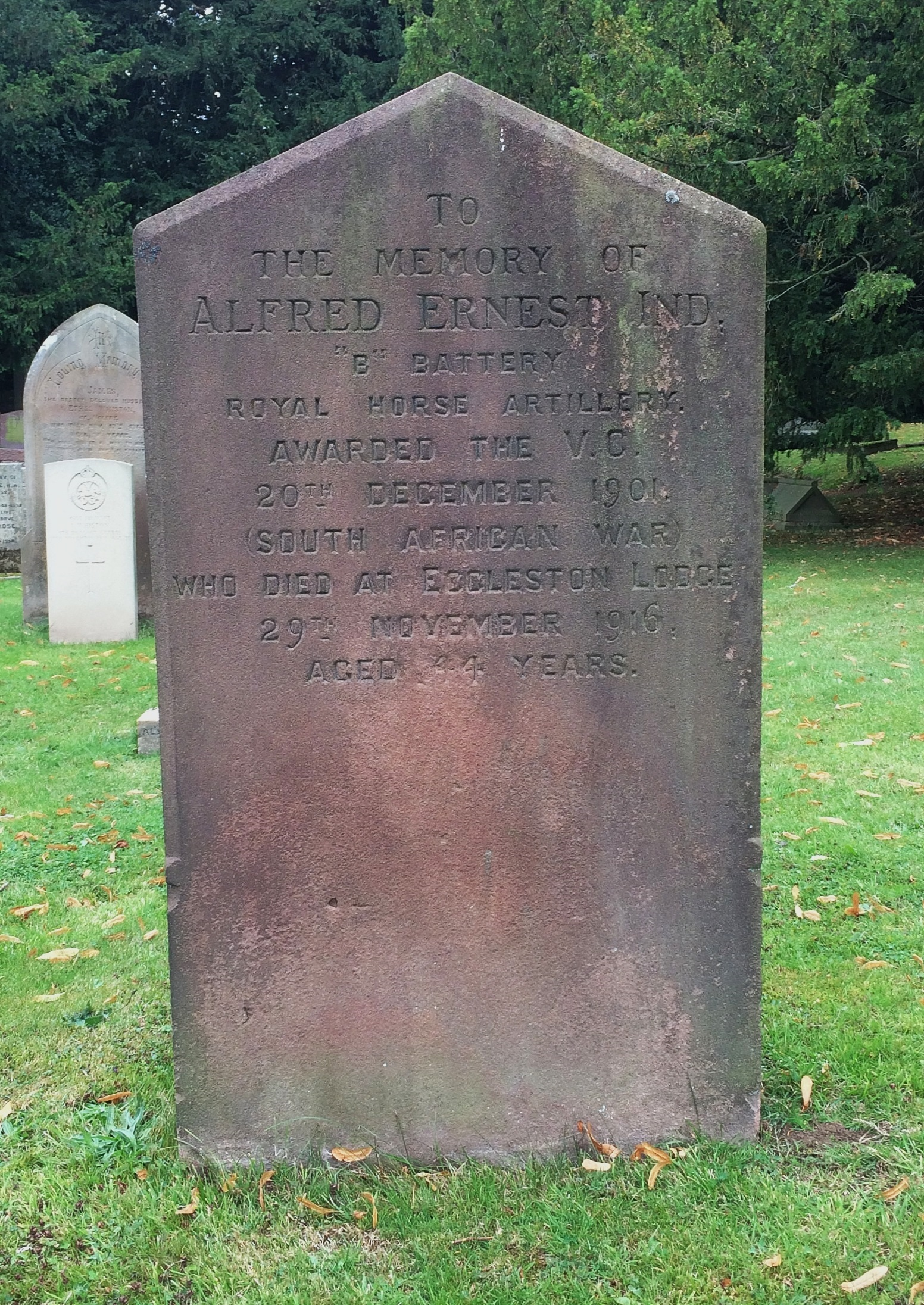
Alfred Ernest Ind, VC (1872–1916)

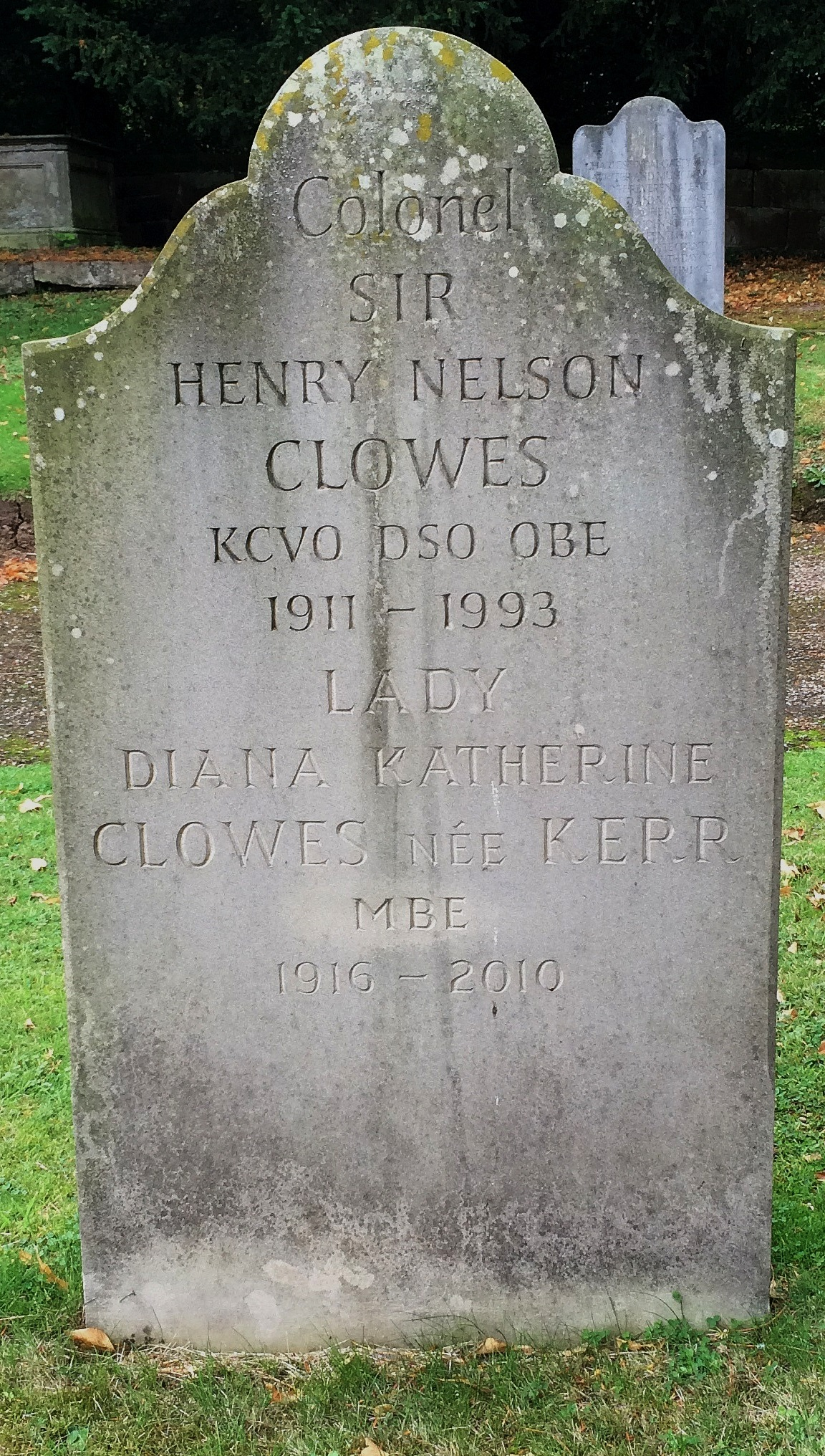
Sir Henry Nelson Clowes (1911–1993)

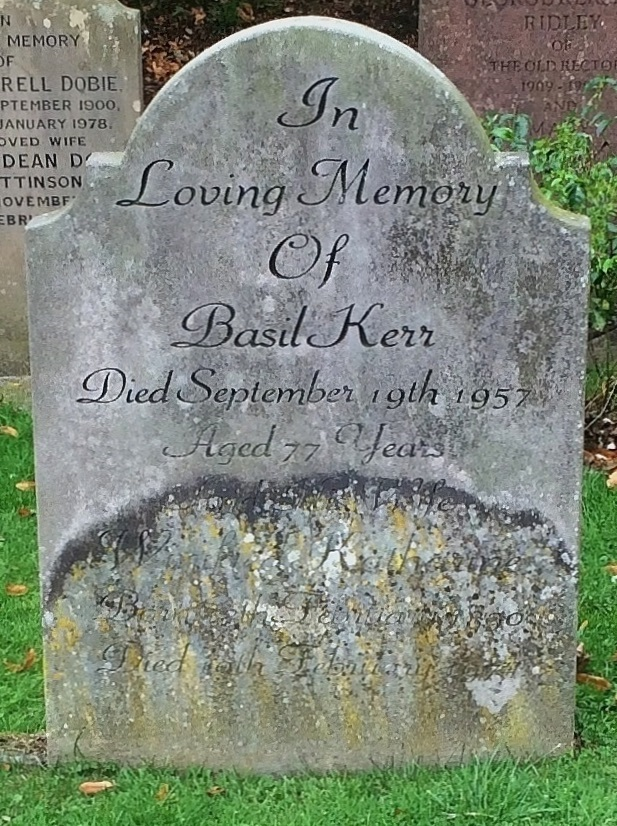
Major Basil Kerr (1879–1957)

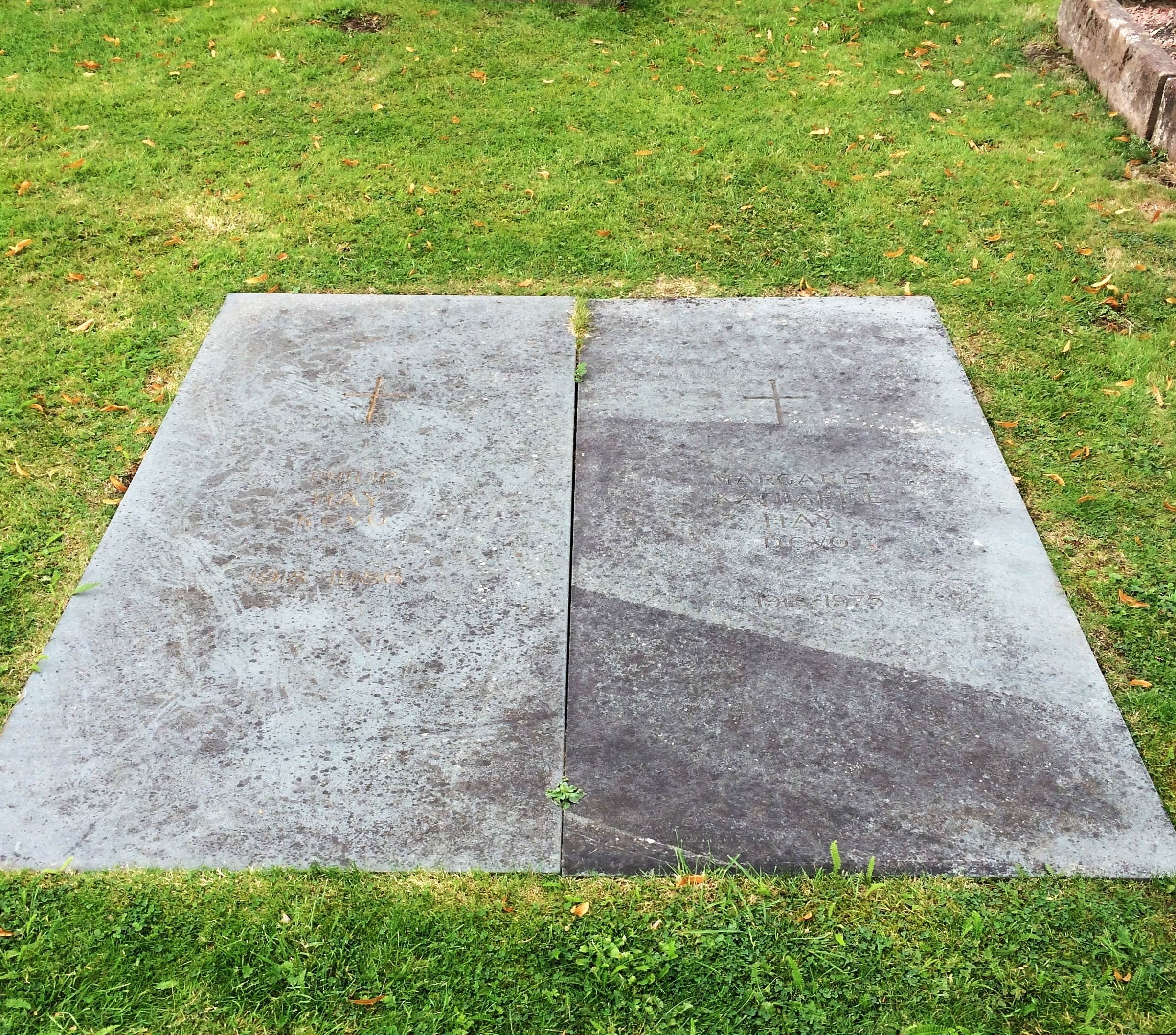
Sir Philip Hay and Dame Margaret Katherine Hay

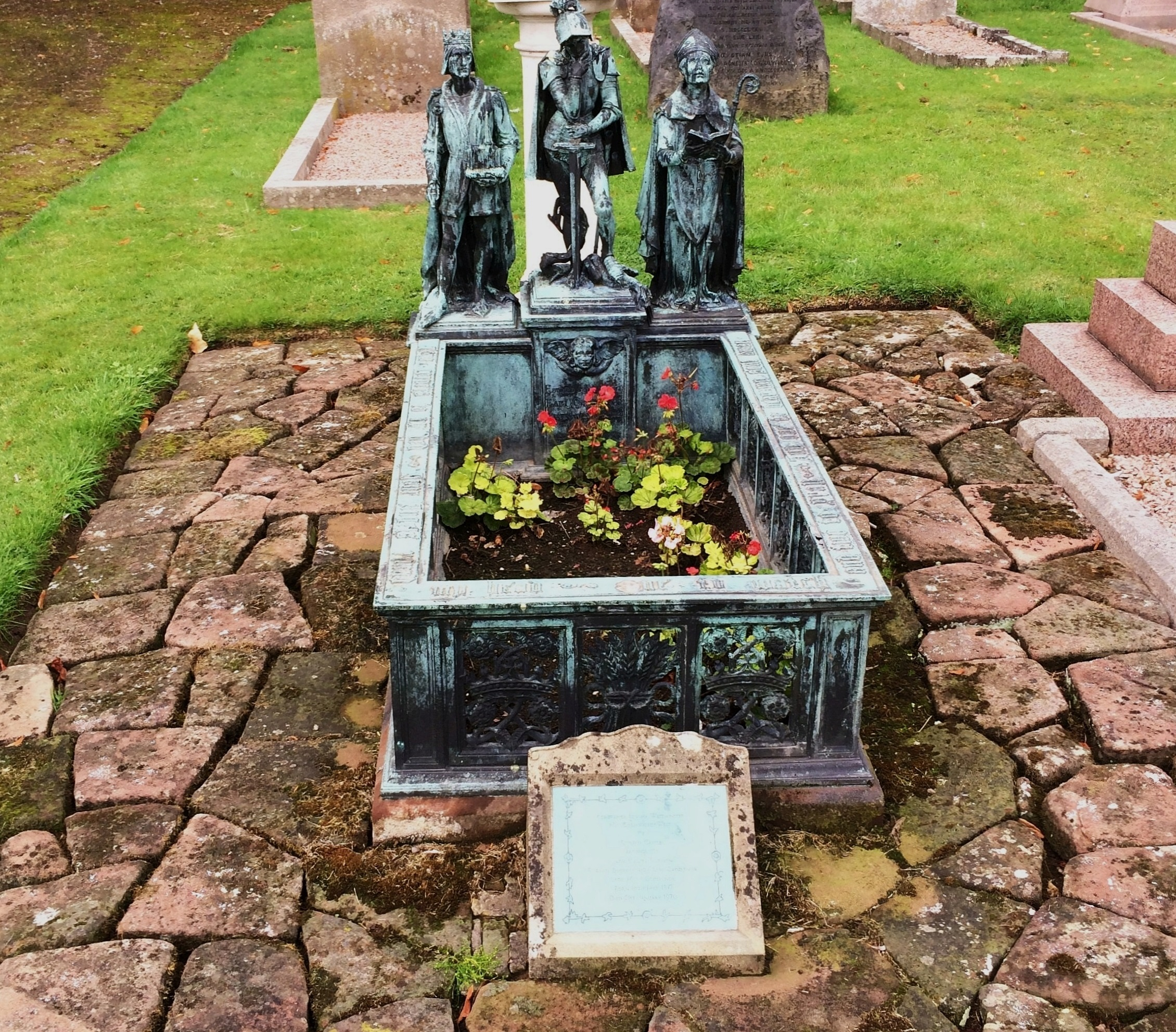
Lord Edward George Hugh Grosvenor (1904–1909)

== See also ==
- Grade I listed buildings in Cheshire West and Chester
- Grade I listed churches in Cheshire
- Listed buildings in Eccleston, Cheshire
