= Alfred Ernest Ind =

British Army soldier, recipient of the Victoria Cross (1872–1916)

Alfred Ernest Ind VC
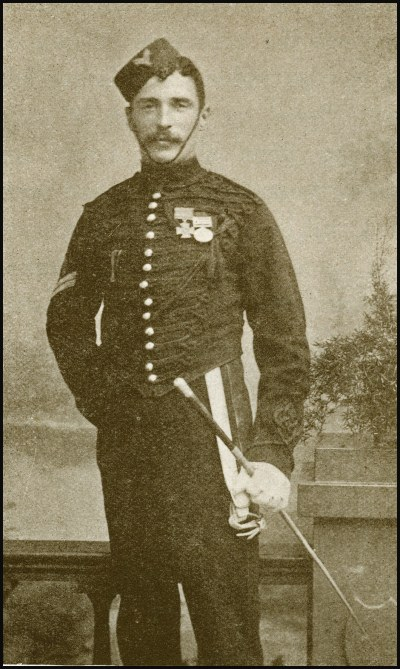
- Born: 16 September 1872; Tetbury, Gloucestershire
- Died: 29 November 1916 (aged 44); Eccleston, Cheshire
- Burial place: Saint Mary the Virgin Churchyard, Eccleston
- Military career
- Allegiance: United Kingdom
- Branch: British Army
- Rank: Sergeant
- Units: Royal Horse Artillery
- Conflicts: Second Boer War
- Awards: Victoria Cross

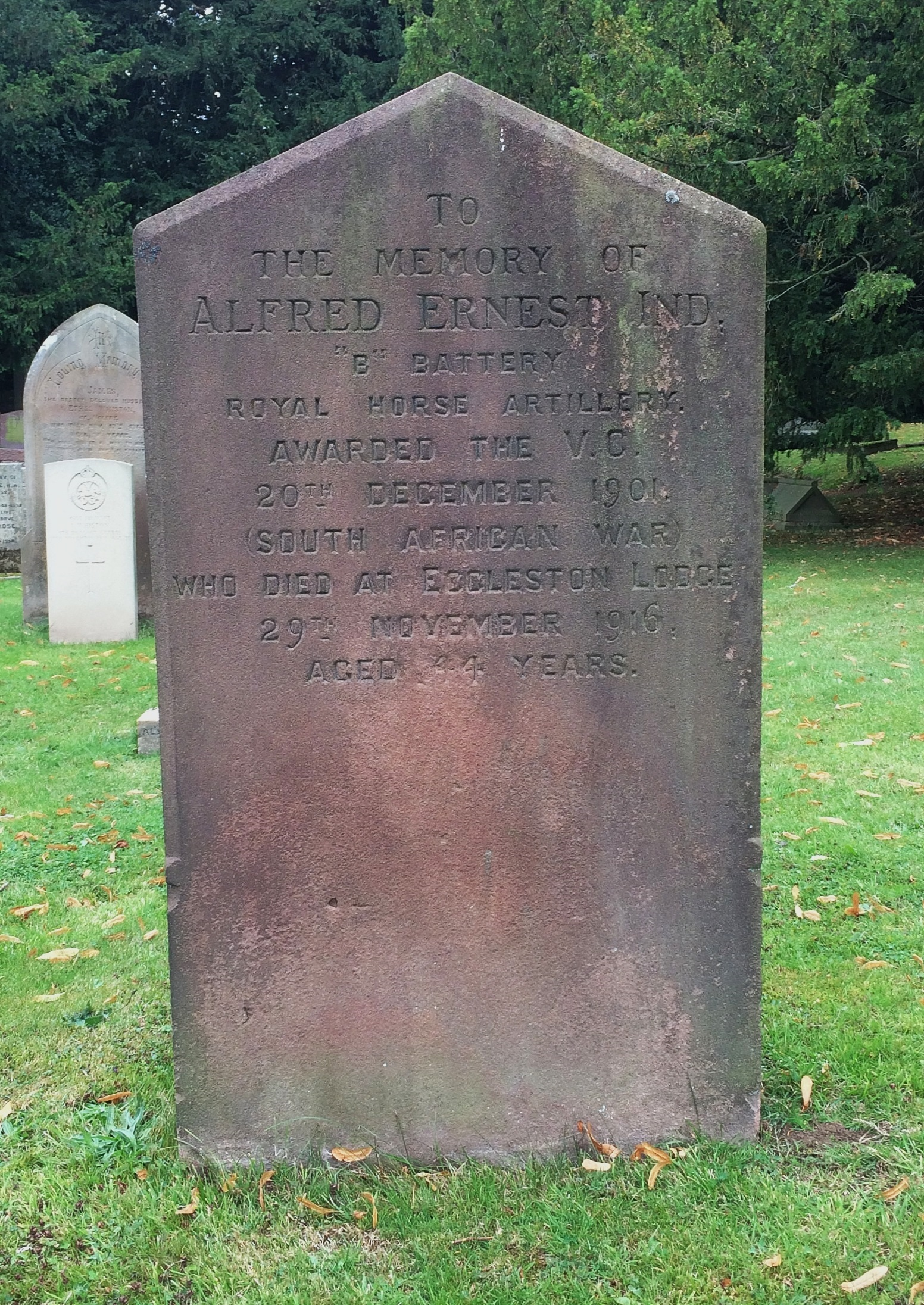
St Mary's Church, Eccleston, grave of Alfred Ernest Ind VC

Alfred Ernest Ind VC (16 September 1872 – 29 November 1916) was an English recipient of the Victoria Cross, the highest and most prestigious award for gallantry in the face of the enemy that can be awarded to British and Commonwealth forces.

Ind was 29 years old, and a Shoeing Smith in X 1 Section Pompoms, Royal Horse Artillery, British Army during the Second Boer War when the following deed took place at Tafelkop, Orange River Colony, South Africa, for which he was awarded the VC.

During the action near Tafelkop, Orange River Colony, on 20th December, 1901, Shoeing-Smith A. E. Ind, X 1 Section Pompoms, stuck to his gun under a very heavy fire, when the whole of the remainder of the Pompom team had been shot down, and continued to fire into the advancing Boers till the last possible moment. Captain Jeffcoat, who was mortally wounded on this, occasion, requested that Shoeing-Smith Ind's gallant conduct in this and in every other action since he joined the Pompom section should be brought to notice.

He later achieved the rank of Sergeant and was a member of the Chestnut Troop. He is buried in the churchyard of Eccleston Church near Eaton Hall, Cheshire.
