= 1701 =

1701 in various calendars
- Gregorian calendar: 1701; MDCCI
- Ab urbe condita: 2454
- Armenian calendar: 1150; ԹՎ ՌՃԾ
- Assyrian calendar: 6451
- Balinese saka calendar: 1622–1623
- Bengali calendar: 1107–1108
- Berber calendar: 2651
- English Regnal year: 13 Will. 3 – 14 Will. 3
- Buddhist calendar: 2245
- Burmese calendar: 1063
- Byzantine calendar: 7209–7210
- Chinese calendar: 庚辰年 (Metal Dragon); 4398 or 4191 — to — 辛巳年 (Metal Snake); 4399 or 4192
- Coptic calendar: 1417–1418
- Discordian calendar: 2867
- Ethiopian calendar: 1693–1694
- Hebrew calendar: 5461–5462
- Hindu calendars
- Vikram Samvat: 1757–1758
- Shaka Samvat: 1622–1623
- Kali Yuga: 4801–4802
- Holocene calendar: 11701
- Igbo calendar: 701–702
- Iranian calendar: 1079–1080
- Islamic calendar: 1112–1113
- Japanese calendar: Genroku 14 (元禄１４年)
- Javanese calendar: 1624–1625
- Julian calendar: Gregorian minus 11 days
- Korean calendar: 4034
- Minguo calendar: 211 before ROC 民前211年
- Nanakshahi calendar: 233
- Thai solar calendar: 2243–2244
- Tibetan calendar: ལྕགས་ཕོ་འབྲུག་ལོ་ (male Iron-Dragon); 1827 or 1446 or 674 — to — ལྕགས་མོ་སྦྲུལ་ལོ་ (female Iron-Snake); 1828 or 1447 or 675

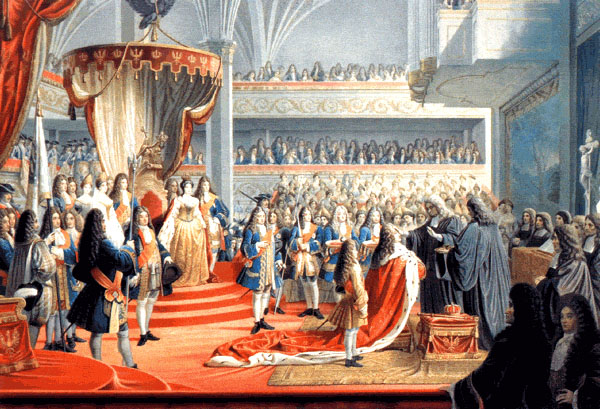
January 18: Frederick I proclaims the Kingdom of Prussia, crowning himself King.

1701 (MDCCI) was a common year starting on Saturday of the Gregorian calendar and a common year starting on Wednesday of the Julian calendar, the 1701st year of the Common Era (CE) and Anno Domini (AD) designations, the 701st year of the 2nd millennium, the 1st year of the 18th century, and the 2nd year of the 1700s decade. As of the start of 1701, the Gregorian calendar was 11 days ahead of the Julian calendar, which remained in localized use until 1923.

In the Swedish calendar it was a common year starting on Tuesday, one day ahead of the Julian and ten days behind the Gregorian calendar.

== Events ==
=== January–June ===
- January 18 – The electorate of Brandenburg–Prussia becomes the Kingdom of Prussia, as Elector Frederick III is proclaimed King Frederick I. Prussia remains part of the Holy Roman Empire. It consists of Brandenburg, Pomerania and East Prussia. Berlin is the capital.
- January 28 – Battle of Dartsedo: The Chinese storm the Tibetan border town of Dartsedo.
- February 17 (February 6, 1700 O.S.) – The 5th Parliament of William III in England assembles. Future British Prime Minister Robert Walpole enters the House of Commons for the first time and soon makes his name as a spokesman for Whig policy.
- April 20th – Mecklenburg-Strelitz is created as a north German duchy.
- June 9 – Safavid troops retreat from Basra, ending a three-year occupation.

=== April–June ===
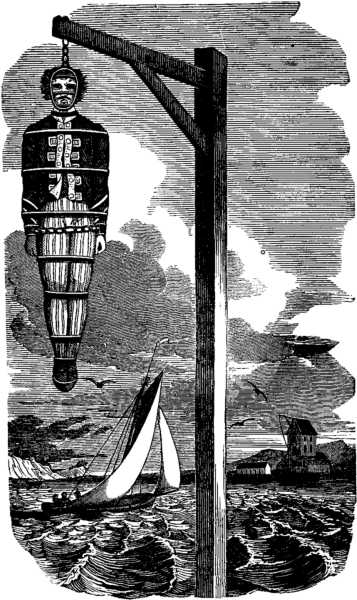
Pirate captain William Kidd is gibbeted in London.

- April 21 – In Japan, the young daimyō Asano Naganori is ordered to commit seppuku (ritual suicide). A group of 47 samurai of his service begin planning to avenge his death.
- May 23 – Scottish-born Captain William Kidd, having been imprisoned in Boston Gaol (Massachusetts) and Newgate Prison (London) and convicted by the High Court of Admiralty of piracy and the murder of one of his crew, is hanged at Execution Dock in Wapping (London). His body suffers gibbeting over the River Thames at Tilbury Point; ballads are already spreading the legend that he has left buried treasure in the Americas.
- June 24 – The Act of Settlement 1701 is passed by the Parliament of England, to exclude the Catholic Stuarts from the British monarchy. Under its terms, King William III, childless, will be succeeded by Queen Mary II's sister Princess Anne and her descendants. If Anne should have no descendants, she will be succeeded by Sophia of Hanover and her descendants (hence the Hanoverian Succession in 1714).

=== July–September ===
- July 9 – The Battle of Carpi, the first skirmish in the War of the Spanish Succession, takes place in Italy when French troops under the command of Nicolas Catinat are attacked by Austrian forces led by Prince Eugene of Savoy.
- July 19 – Crossing of the Düna: Following his victories over Denmark-Norway and Russia in 1700, Charles XII of Sweden escalates the conflict in the Great Northern War by an invasion of Poland. The Swedish defeat the army of Saxony (then in personal union with Poland) at the River Dvina.

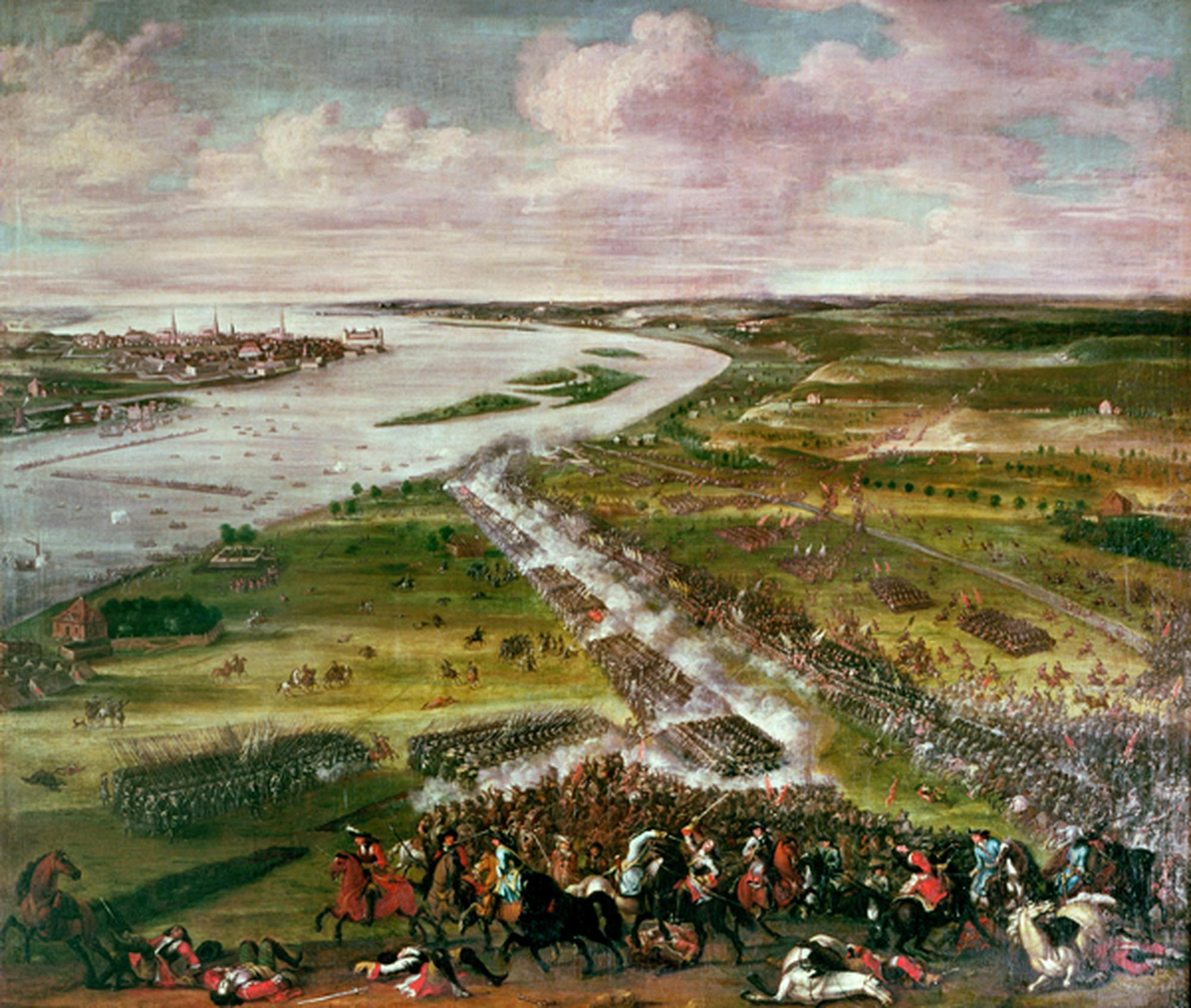
July 9: Crossing of the Düna.

- July 24 – A French emporium named Fort Ponchartrain is founded along the west side of the Detroit River in North America, and later becomes the site of the city of Detroit.
- August 4 – The Great Peace of Montreal is signed, ending 100 years of war between the Iroquois Confederacy and New France, and its Huron and Algonquian allies. Formerly allied with the English, the treaty assures the Iroquois will be neutral, if France and England ever resume hostilities.
- September 16 – Deposed King James II of England (James VII of Scotland) dies in exile, at the Château de Saint-Germain-en-Laye in France. His supporters, the Jacobites, turn to his son James Francis Edward Stuart (later called "The Old Pretender"), whom they recognise as James VIII and III. Louis XIV of France, the Papal States, and Spain also recognise him as the rightful heir.

=== October–December ===
- October 9 – The Collegiate School of Connecticut (later renamed Yale University) is chartered in Old Saybrook, Connecticut.
- November 2 – King Philip V of Spain marries for the first time, to 13-year-old Maria Luisa Gabriella of Savoy, who serves as Queen Consort until her death from tuberculosis at the age of 25.
- November 11 (O.S., November 22 N.S.) – The House of Commons of England is dissolved by King William III and new elections are called for all 531 seats.
- December 29 (O.S., January 9, 1702 N.S.) – The Battle of Erastfer takes place near what becomes Erastvere in Estonia, as a large Russian force commanded by Boris Sheremetev invades Swedish Livonia and overwhelms a smaller force led by Wolmar Anton von Schlippenbach in the first significant Russian victory in the Great Northern War.

=== Date unknown ===
- English agriculturalist Jethro Tull invents a drill for planting seeds in rows.
- The Philharmonic Society (Academia Philharmonicorum) is established in Ljubljana, Slovenia.

== Births ==
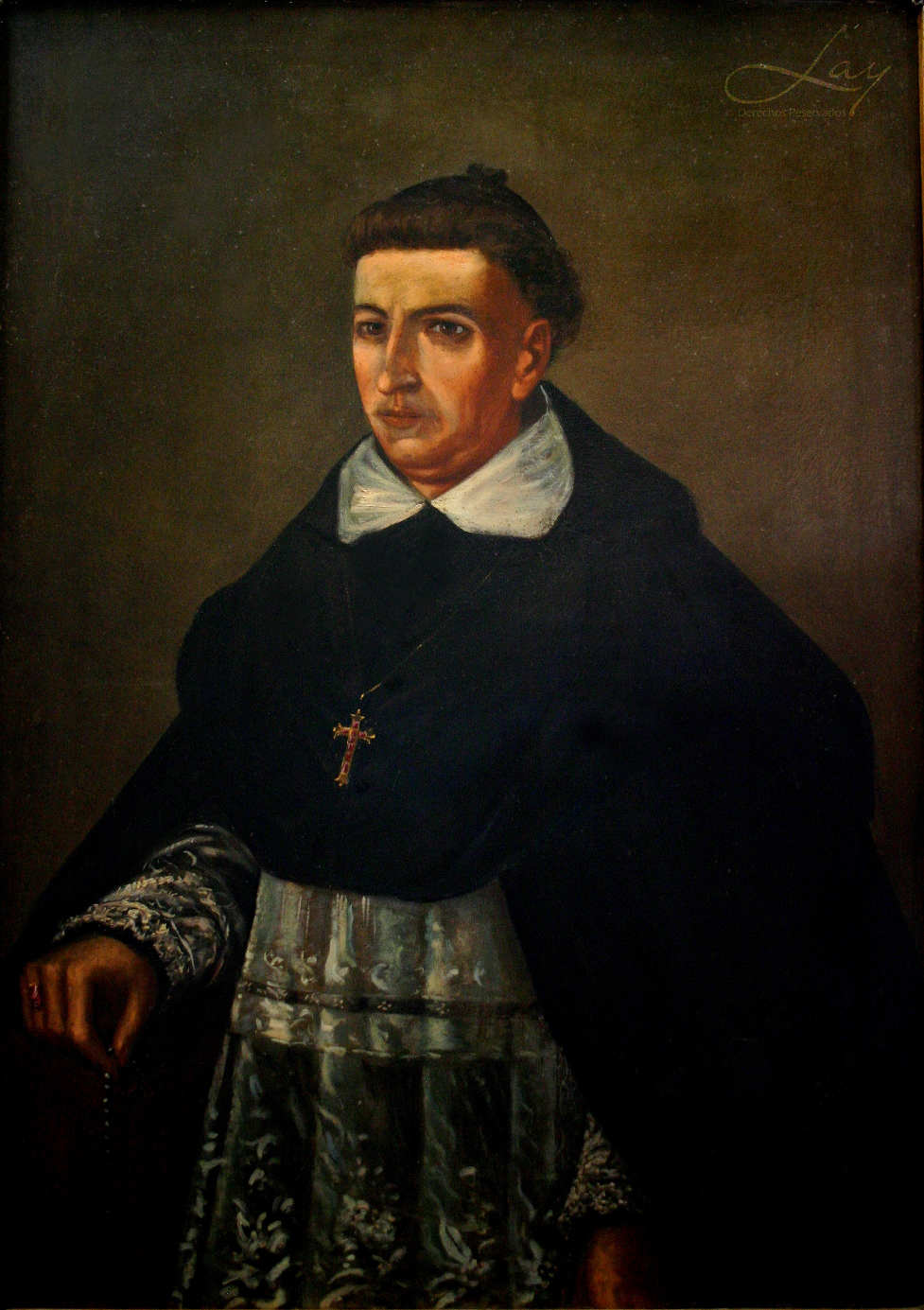
Antonio Alcalde Barriga born 14 March

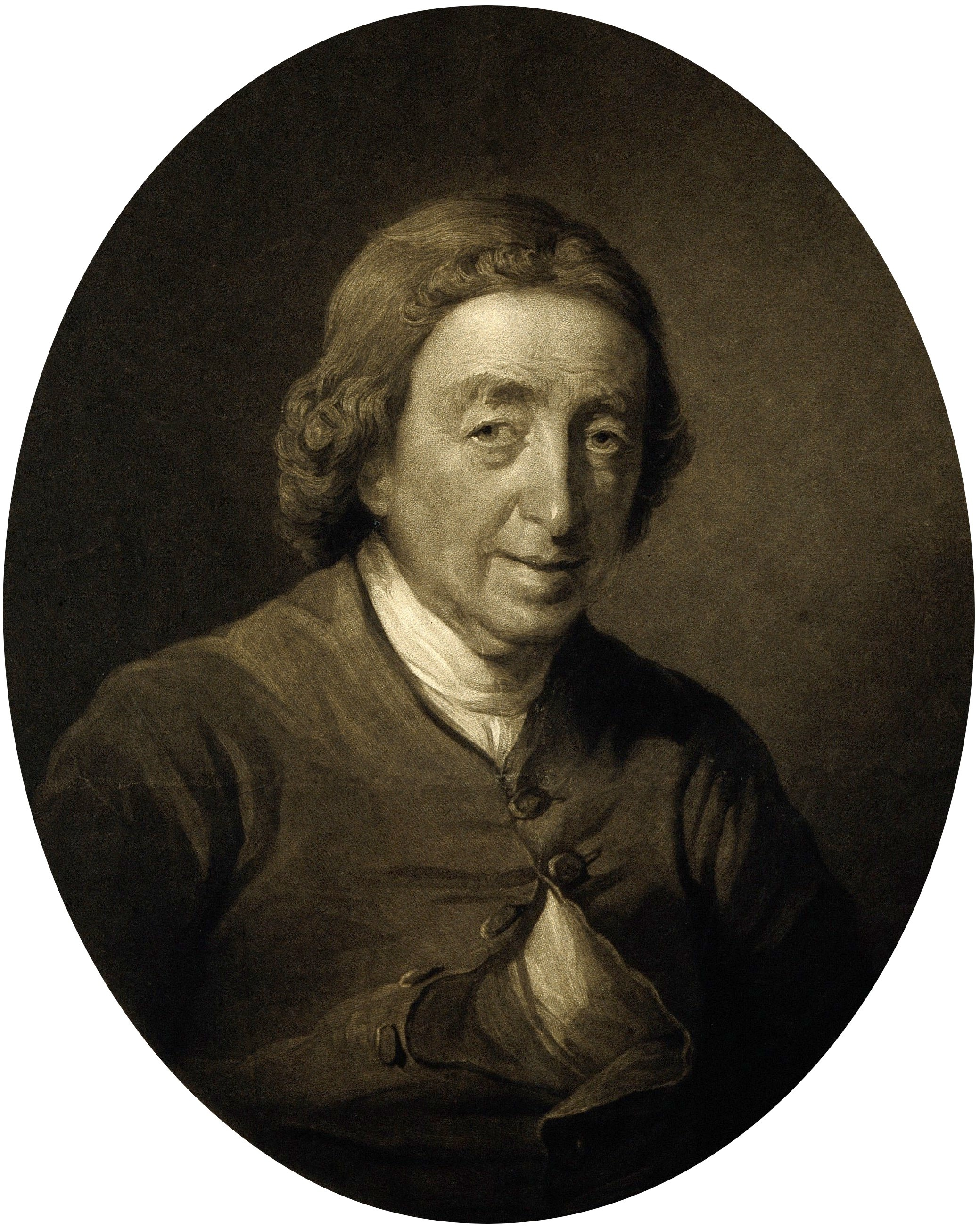
William Emerson (mathematician) born 14 May

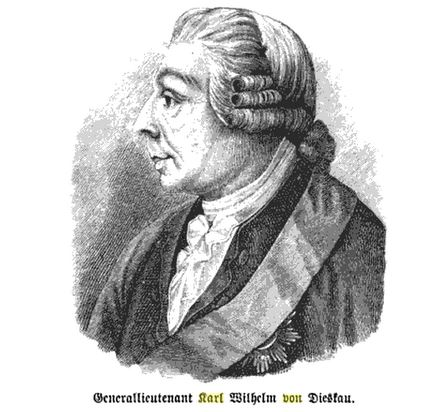
Karl Wilhelm von Dieskau born 9 August

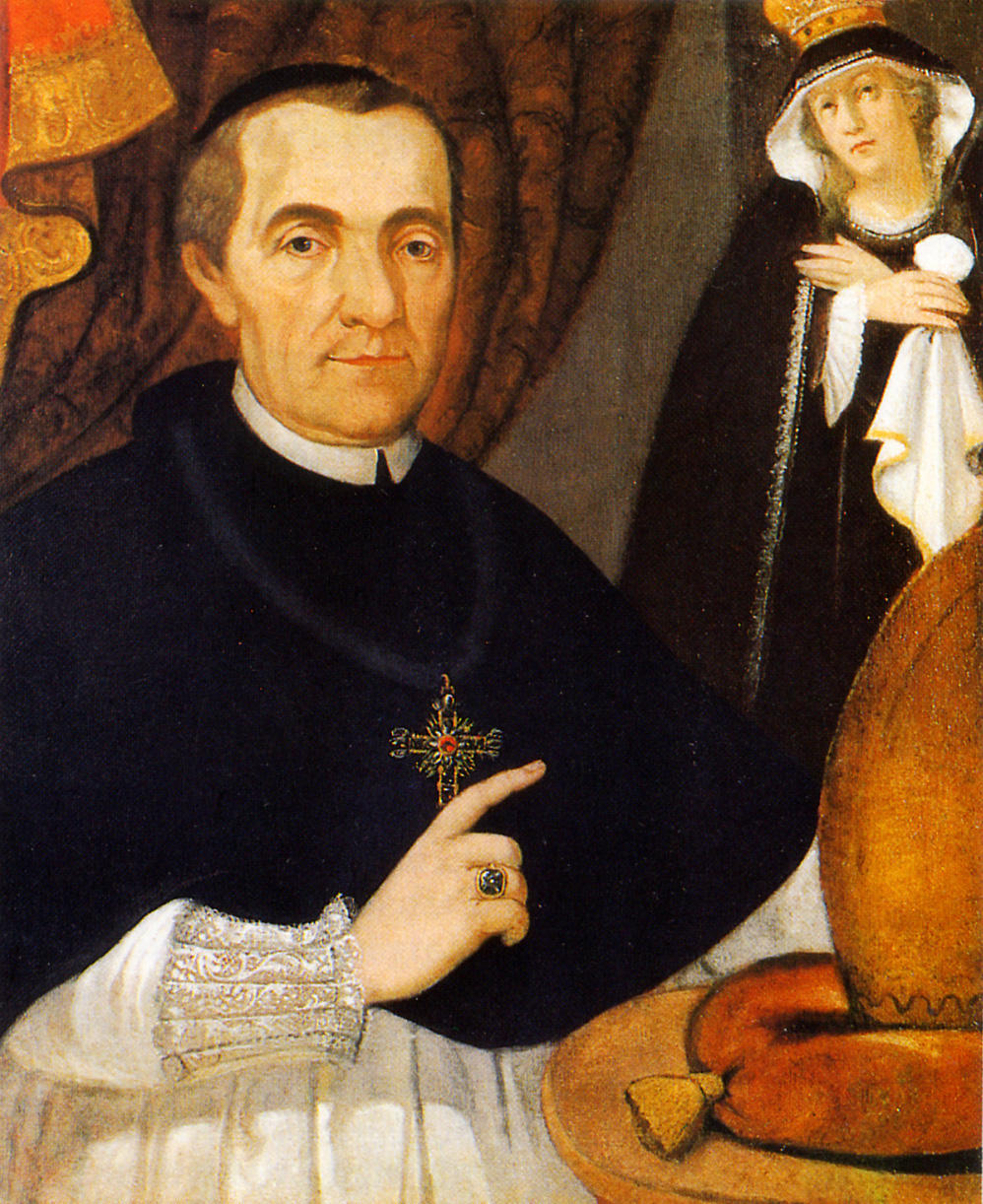
Maurus Xaverius Herbst born 14 September

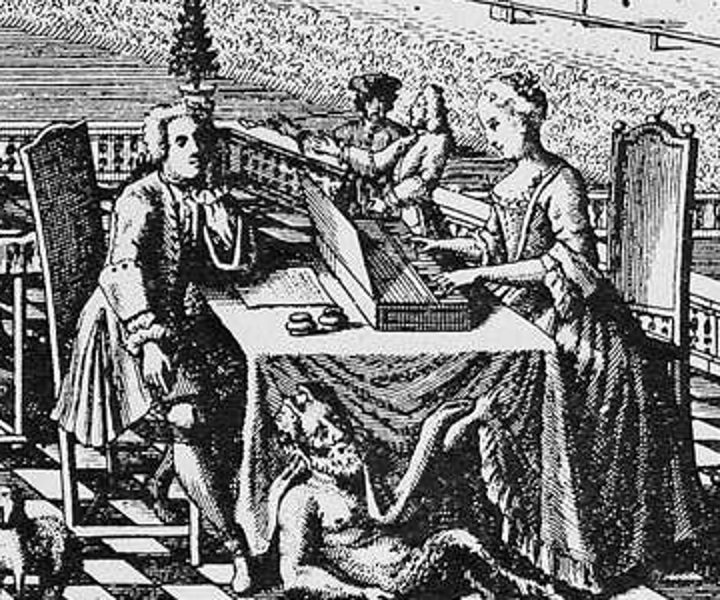
Anna Magdalena Bach born 22 September

Ignatius of Laconi born 10 December

=== January–March ===
- January 4 – Count Palatine William of Gelnhausen, Imperial Field Marshal (d. 1760)
- January 6 – Georg Ludwig von Bar, German (d. 1767)
- January 14 – Thomas Edwards, silversmith active in colonial Boston (d. 1755)
- January 17 – William Lubbock, British divine (d. 1754)
- January 18 – Johann Jakob Moser, German jurist (d. 1785)
- January 23 – Anne Antoine, Comte d'Aché, French naval officer who became vice admiral (d. 1780)
- January 26 – François Dominique de Barberie de Saint-Contest, French Foreign Minister (d. 1754)
- January 27 – Johann Nikolaus von Hontheim, German historian and theologian (d. 1790)
- January 28
  - Thomas Amory, English dissenting tutor and minister and poet from Taunton (d. 1774)
  - Charles Marie de La Condamine, French mathematician and geographer (d. 1774)
- February 1 – Johan Agrell, late German/Swedish baroque composer (d. 1765)
- February 7 – Christian Ludwig Gersten, German scientist (d. 1762)
- February 8 – Johann Baptist Martinelli, Austrian architect (d. 1754)
- February 11 – Carlo Lodi, Italian painter of the late-Baroque period in Bologna (d. 1765)
- February 14 – Enrique Flórez, Spanish historian (d. 1773)
- February 24 – François-Joseph Hunauld, French anatomist born in Châteaubriant (d. 1742)
- February 25 – Thomas Adam, Church of England clergyman and religious writer (d. 1784)
- February 28 – Jacek Rybiński, Cistercian and the last abbot of the Oliwa monastery (d. 1782)
- March 1 – Johann Jakob Breitinger, Swiss philologist and author (d. 1776)
- March 2 – Lewis Morris, Welsh hydrographer (d. 1765)
- March 6 – Louis-René de Caradeuc de La Chalotais, French jurist on the so-called "Brittany affair" (d. 1785)
- March 7 – Philip Hawkins, MP (d. 1738)
- March 11 – Joseph Leeson, 1st Earl of Milltown, Irish politician (d. 1783)
- March 12 – Johann Friedrich Cotta, German Lutheran theologian (d. 1779)
- March 14 – Antonio Alcalde Barriga, Spanish Roman Catholic prelate; member from the Order of Preachers; Bishop of Guadalajara (d. 1792)
- March 15 – John Carmichael, 3rd Earl of Hyndford (d. 1767)
- March 16 – Daniel Lorenz Salthenius, Swedish theologian (d. 1750)
- March 18 – Niclas Sahlgren, Swedish merchant and philanthropist (d. 1776)
- March 21 – Jacques Bridaine, French Catholic preacher and missionary (d. 1767)
- March 25 – John Goffe, Colonial American soldier (d. 1786)

=== April–June ===
- April 9 – Giambattista Nolli, Italian architect (d. 1756)
- April 25 – John Bristow, English merchant, politician (d. 1768)
- April 27
  - Sebastian Redford, English Jesuit (d. 1763)
  - Charles Emmanuel III of Sardinia, Duke of Savoy and King of Sardinia from 1730 (d. 1773)
- April 28 – Françoise Basseporte, French painter (d. 1780)
- May 14 – William Emerson, English mathematician (d. 1782)
- May 18 – Charles Lennox, 2nd Duke of Richmond, English aristocrat, philanthropist and cricket patron (d. 1750)
- May 24
  - Jane Scott, Countess of Dalkeith (d. 1729)
  - Johann IX Philipp von Walderdorff, Archbishop-Elector of Trier from 1756 to 1768 (d. 1768)
- May 26 – Jean-Joseph Rallier des Ourmes, French mathematician (d. 1771)
- May 28 – Giuseppe Antonio Pujati, Italian physician (d. 1760)
- May 29 – Georg Friedrich Strass, Alsatian jeweler and inventor of the rhinestone (d. 1773)
- June 2 – Thomas Townshend, British politician (d. 1780)
- June 4
  - Nicolai Eigtved, Danish architect (d. 1754)
  - Theodoor Verhaegen, sculptor from the Southern Netherlands (d. 1759)
- June 9 – Carl Hieronimus Gustmeyer, Danish merchant (d. 1756)
- June 11 – David Carnegie, 5th Earl of Northesk, son of David Carnegie (d. 1741)
- June 17
  - Edward Antill, colonial plantation owner and winemaker (d. 1770)
  - Paula de Odivelas (d. 1768)
- June 19 – François Rebel, French composer (d. 1775)
- June 21 – Otto Magnus von Schwerin, Prussian general in the army of Frederick the Great (d. 1777)
- June 22 – Nicolai Eigtved, Danish architect (d. 1754)
- June 27 – Paul Jacques Malouin, French chemist and physicist (d. 1778)

=== July–September ===
- July 6 – Mary, Countess of Harold, English aristocrat and philanthropist (d. 1785)
- July 9 – Jean-Frédéric Phélypeaux, Count of Maurepas, French statesman and Count of Maurepas (d. 1781)
- August 4
  - Thomas Blackwell, Scottish classical scholar (d. 1757)
  - Brownlow Cecil, 8th Earl of Exeter, England (d. 1754)
- August 9 – Karl Wilhelm von Dieskau, Prussian lieutenant general, general inspector of the artillery (d. 1777)
- August 20 – Domenico Luigi Valeri, Italian painter and architect active in Marche (d. 1746)
- August 21 – George Bowes, English coal proprietor, Member of Parliament (d. 1760)
- September 6 – Johann Georg Dathan (d. 1749)
- September 14 – Maurus Xaverius Herbst, German Benedictine abbot (d. 1757)
- September 16 – James Cornwallis, Royal Navy officer and politician, second son of Charles Cornwallis (d. 1727)
- September 17 – Paul-Joseph Le Moyne de Longueuil, seigneur and colonial army officer in New France; governor of Trois-Rivières (d. 1778)
- September 21 – George Byng, 3rd Viscount Torrington, British Army general (d. 1750)
- September 22 – Anna Magdalena Bach, accomplished German singer, second wife of Johann Sebastian Bach (d. 1760)
- September 23 – Bredo von Munthe af Morgenstierne, Norwegian civil servant (d. 1757)
- September 28 – Stephen Hansen, Danish industrialist (d. 1770)
- September 30 – Enrico Enríquez, Italian Roman Catholic cardinal (d. 1756)

=== October–December ===
- October 3 – Isaac Norris, merchant and statesman in provincial Pennsylvania (d. 1766)
- October 15 – Marie-Marguerite d'Youville, Canadian saint (d. 1771)
- October 18 – Charles le Beau, French historical writer (d. 1778)
- October 20 – Jean-Baptiste de La Noue, French actor and playwright (d. 1760)
- October 22 – Maria Amalia, Holy Roman Empress (d. 1756)
- October 24 – Jacques Legardeur de Saint-Pierre, Canadian military commander (d. 1755)
- October 28 – Simón de Anda y Salazar, Governor-General of the Philippines (d. 1776)
- October 30 – Anton Gogeisl, German astronomer (d. 1771)
- October 31 – William Ellery, Sr., Rhode Island colonial deputy governor (d. 1764)
- November 3 – Smart Lethieullier, English antiquary (d. 1760)
- November 5 or 1702 – Pietro Longhi, Venetian painter (d. 1785)
- November 6 – Jean-Baptiste Malter, French dancer and dance master (d. 1746)
- November 10 – Johann Joseph Couven, German Baroque architect (d. 1763)
- November 21 – John Arundell, 4th Baron Arundell of Trerice (d. 1768)
- November 27 – Anders Celsius, Swedish astronomer (d. 1744)
- November 28
  - James Burrow, British scholar (d. 1782)
  - Daniel Wray, English antiquary and Fellow of the Royal Society (d. 1783)
- December 9 – Elisha Freeman, Canadian politician (d. 1777)
- December 10 – Ignatius of Laconi (d. 1781)
- December 11 – Charles Goore, English merchant and politician (d. 1783)
- December 16 – Olof Arenius, Swedish portrait painter (d. 1766)
- December 17 – Bernard of Bologna, Italian theologian (d. 1770)
- December 21
  - Louis Daniel Arnault de Nobleville, French physician and naturalist (d. 1778)
  - Guillaume Taraval, French painter (d. 1750)
  - Taylor White, British judge (d. 1772)

== Deaths ==
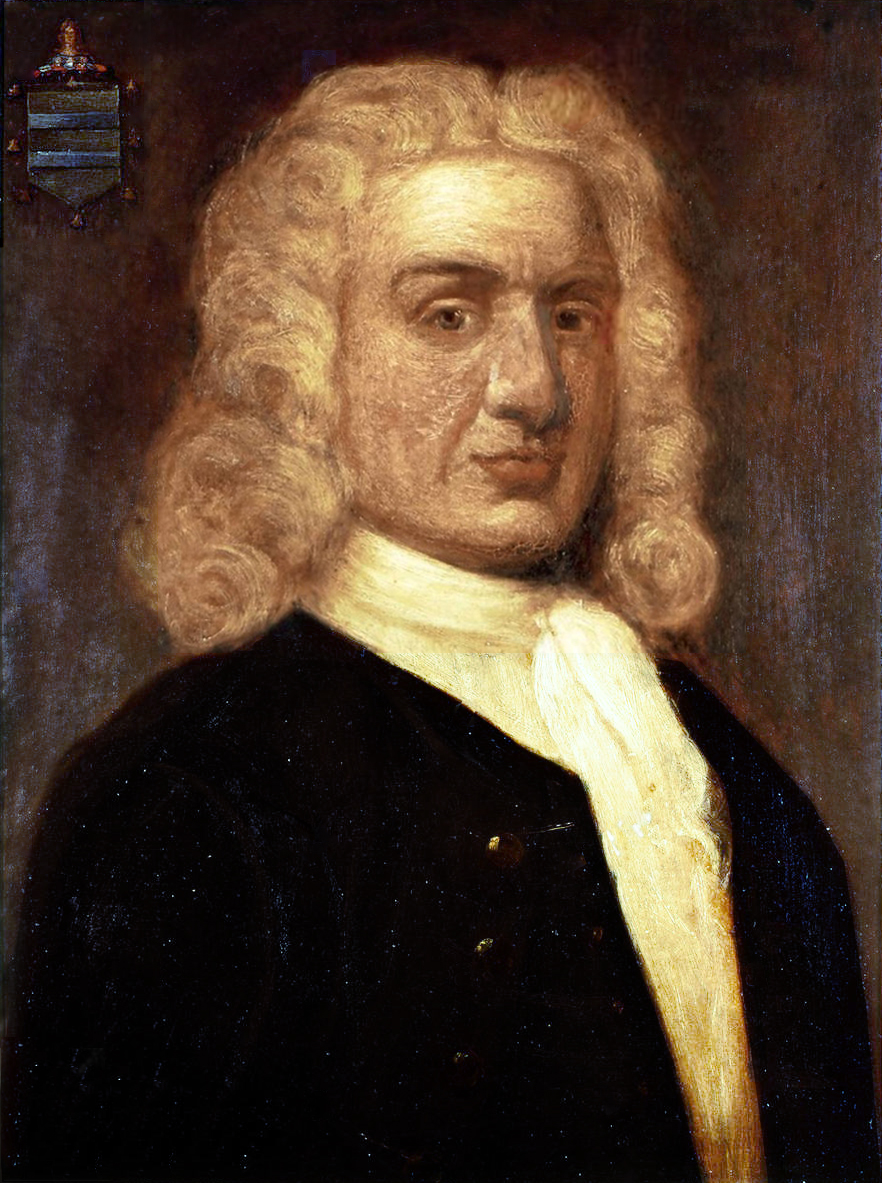
William Kidd died 23 May

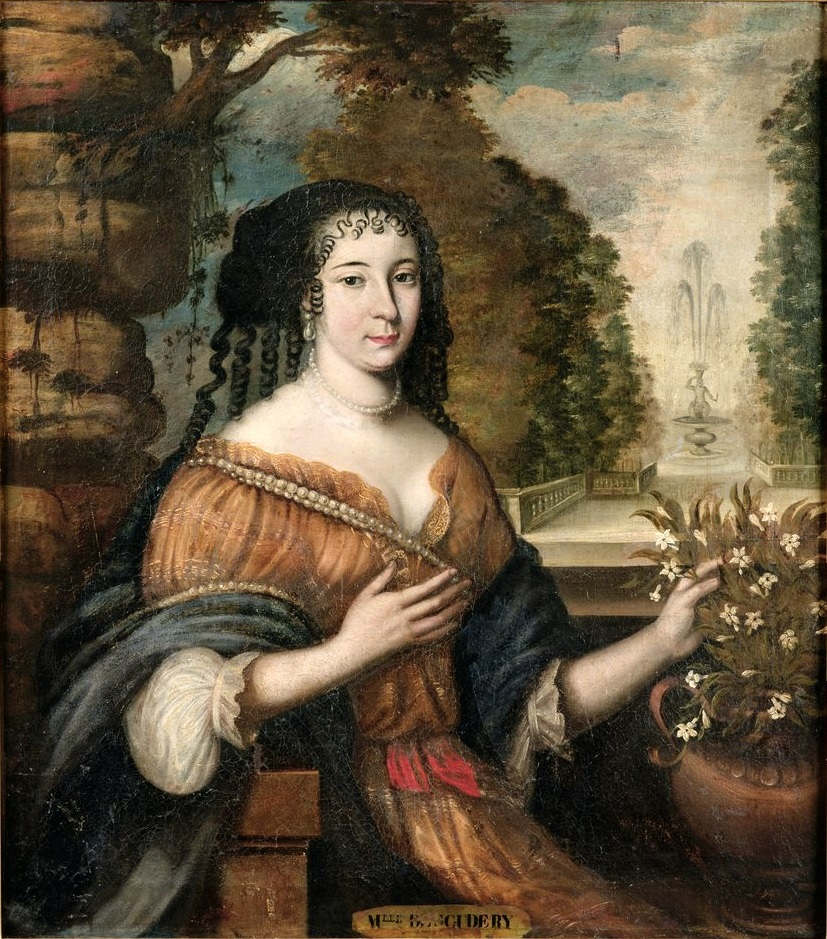
Madeleine de Scudéry died 2 June

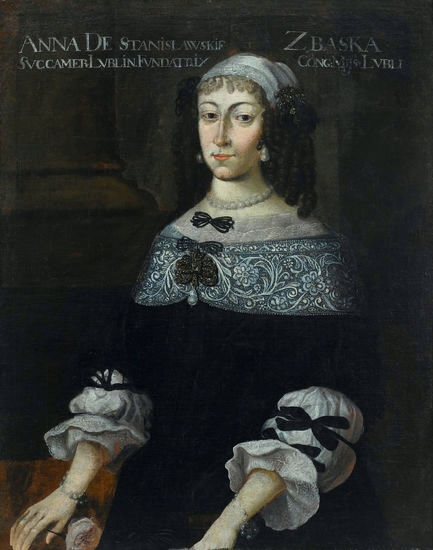
Anna Stanisławska died 2 June

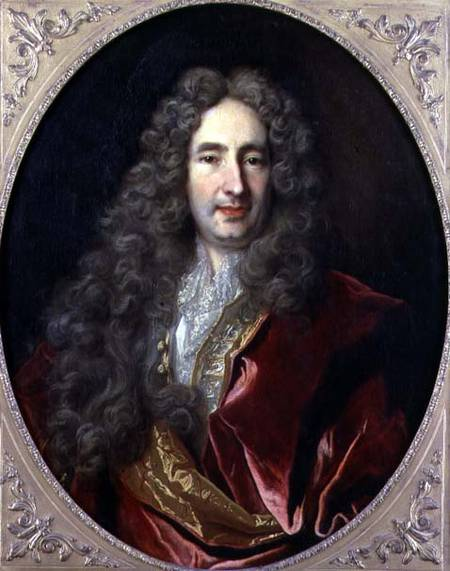
Edmé Boursault died 15 September

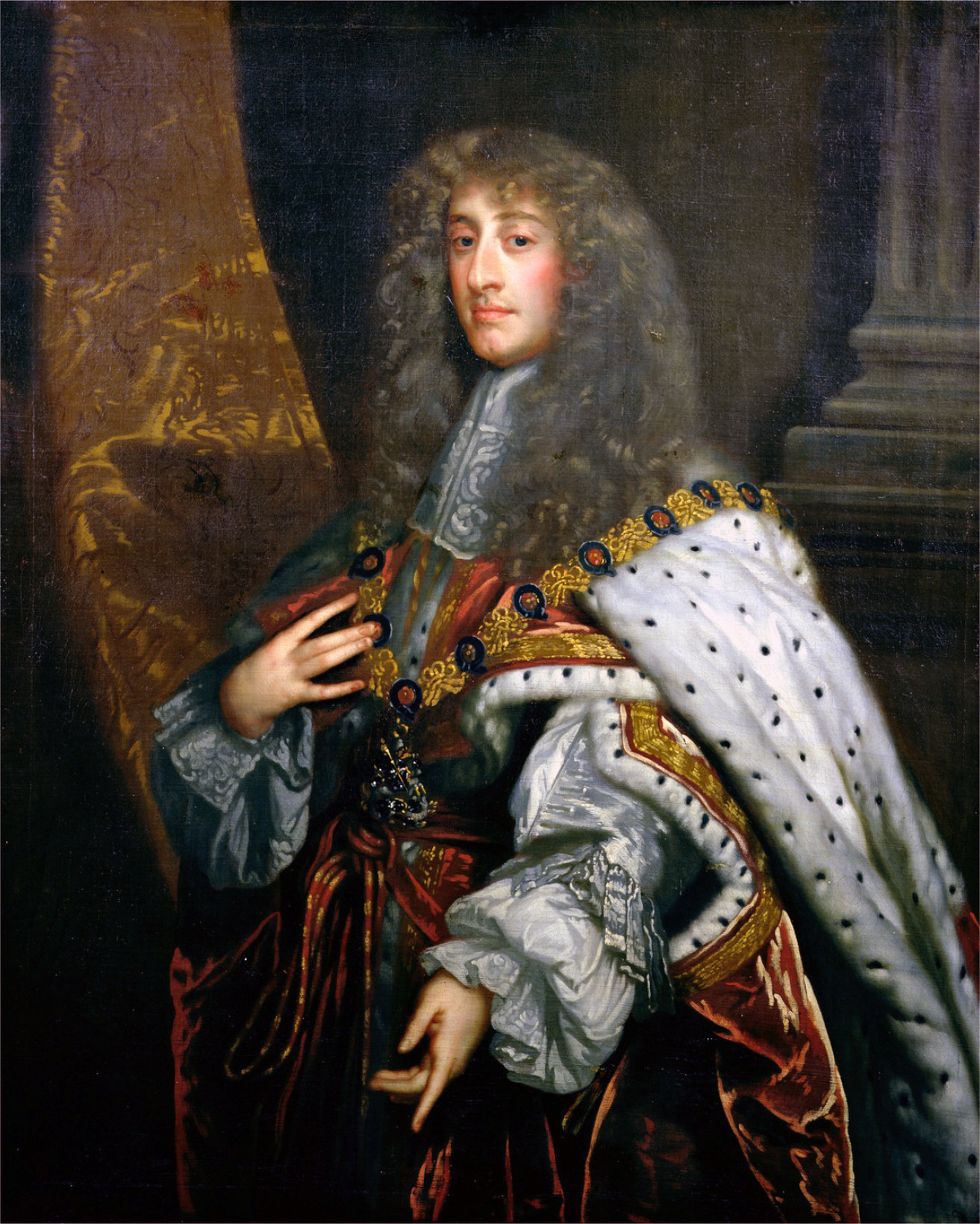
James II of England died 16 September

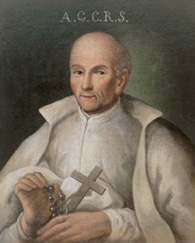
Stanislaus Papczyński died 17 September

- January 3
  - Fernand Palma d'Artois, Vicar Apostolic of Great Mogul and Titular Archbishop of Ancyra (b. 1623)
  - Louis I of Monaco (b. 1642)
- January 4
  - Luís de Sousa, cardinal (b. 1630)
  - Ernst Rüdiger von Starhemberg, Austrian field marshal (b. 1638)
- January 6 – Toussaint Rose, French writer (b. 1611)
- January 14 – Tokugawa Mitsukuni, Japanese warlord (b. 1628)
- January 17 – Domenico Belisario de Bellis, Roman Catholic prelate, Bishop of Molfetta (1696–1701) (b. 1647)
- January 18 – Sir John Fagg, 1st Baronet, English politician (b. 1627)
- January 27 – James Graham, English born colonial American politician (b. 1650)
- February 10 – Savo Millini, Roman Catholic cardinal (b. 1644)
- February 15 – François de Clermont-Tonnerre, French aristocrat and cleric (b. 1629)
- February 27 – Christiana Oxenstierna, Swedish noble (b. 1661)
- March 15 – Jean Renaud de Segrais, French writer (b. 1624)
- March 19 – John Egerton, 3rd Earl of Bridgewater, English politician (b. 1646)
- March 31 – Thomas van Rhee, Governor of Dutch Ceylon (b. 1634)
- April 2 – Henry Howard, 7th Duke of Norfolk (b. 1655)
- April 4 – Joseph Haines, English entertainer and author
- April 8 – Alexander Sforza, Titular Archbishop of Neocaesarea in Ponto and Apostolic Nuncio to Savoy (b. 1658)
- April 18 – Henry, Prince of Nassau-Dillenburg, (1662–1701) (b. 1641)
- April 21 – Asano Naganori, Japanese warlord (b. 1667)
- April 24 – Fernando de Carvajal y Ribera, Roman Catholic prelate, Archbishop of Santo Domingo (b. 1632)
- May 8
  - Robert Bertie, 3rd Earl of Lindsey, English noble (b. 1630)
  - Jacob de Heusch, Dutch painter (b. 1656)
- May 18 – Niwa Mitsushige, Edo period Japanese samurai, 2nd Niwa daimyō of Shirakawa Domain and the 1st Niwa daimyō of Nihonmatsu Domain (b. 1622)
- May 20
  - Rosine Elisabeth Menthe, morganatic wife of Duke Rudolf August of Brunswick-Wolfenbüttel (b. 1663)
  - Christiana of Schleswig-Holstein-Sonderburg-Glücksburg, duchess consort of Saxe-Merseburg (b. 1634)
- May 23
  - Captain William Kidd, Scottish privateer (b. 1645)
  - Anne Hilarion de Tourville, French naval commander who served under King Louis XIV (b. 1642)
- May 26 – Augusta of Schleswig-Holstein-Sonderburg-Glücksburg, Danish-German princess (b. 1633)
- May 30 – Theophilus Hastings, 7th Earl of Huntingdon, 17th-century English politician and Jacobite (b. 1650)
- June 2
  - Madeleine de Scudéry, French writer (b. 1607)
  - Anna Stanisławska, Polish author and poet known for her sole work (b. 1651)
- June 7 – Charles Cotterell, English courtier (b. 1615)
- June 9 – Philippe I, Duke of Orléans, younger son of Louis XIII of France and his wife (b. 1640)
- June 24 – Ford Grey, 1st Earl of Tankerville (b. 1655)
- July 5 – Pier Matteo Petrucci, Roman Catholic cardinal (b. 1636)
- July 7 – William Stoughton, American judge at the Salem witch trials (b. 1631)
- July 12 – Giovanni Battista Nepita, Bishop of Massa Lubrense and Bishop of Sant'Angelo dei Lombardi e Bisaccia (b. 1624)
- July 14 – Lorenzo Kreutter de Corvinis, Roman Catholic prelate, Bishop of Vieste (1697–1701) (b. 1658)
- July 16 – Justus Danckerts, Dutch artist (b. 1635)
- August 6 – William Hedges, the first governor of the East India Company (b. 1632)
- August 20 – Sir Charles Sedley, 5th Baronet, English playwright (b. 1639)
- August 22 – John Granville, 1st Earl of Bath, English royalist statesman (b. 1628)
- August 31 – Samuel Chappuzeau, French scholar (b. 1625)
- September 4 – Charles Granville, 2nd Earl of Bath, English diplomat (b. 1661)
- September 15 – Edmé Boursault, French writer (b. 1638)
- September 16 – James II of England, King of England and Ireland, and of Scotland (as James VII) (b. 1633)
- September 17 – Stanislaus Papczyński, Polish priest (b. 1631)
- September 19 – Walter Moyle, English politician (b. 1627)
- September 20 – Bernard Granville, courtier of King Charles II and MP (b. 1631)
- September 28 – Johannetta of Sayn-Wittgenstein, German noblewoman (b. 1632)
- October 3 – Joseph Williamson, English politician (b. 1633)
- November 1 – Alexander Stuart, 5th Earl of Moray, Scottish nobleman (b. 1634)
- November 5 – Charles Gerard, 2nd Earl of Macclesfield, French-born English politician (b. c. 1659)
- November 9 – Hui-bin Jang, Korean royal consort (b. 1659)
- November 27 – Maurizio Bertone, Roman Catholic prelate, Bishop of Fossano (1678–1701) (b. 1639)
- November 29 – Carlo Labia, Archbishop (Personal Title) of Adria and Archbishop of Corfù (b. 1624)
- December 2 – Zofia Czarnkowska Opalińska, mother-in-law of King Stanislaus I of Poland (b. 1660)
- December 21 – Sir Hugh Paterson, 1st Baronet, Scottish landowner (b. 1659)
