= 1777 =

1777 in various calendars
- Gregorian calendar: 1777; MDCCLXXVII
- Ab urbe condita: 2530
- Armenian calendar: 1226; ԹՎ ՌՄԻԶ
- Assyrian calendar: 6527
- Balinese saka calendar: 1698–1699
- Bengali calendar: 1183–1184
- Berber calendar: 2727
- British Regnal year: 17 Geo. 3 – 18 Geo. 3
- Buddhist calendar: 2321
- Burmese calendar: 1139
- Byzantine calendar: 7285–7286
- Chinese calendar: 丙申年 (Fire Monkey); 4474 or 4267 — to — 丁酉年 (Fire Rooster); 4475 or 4268
- Coptic calendar: 1493–1494
- Discordian calendar: 2943
- Ethiopian calendar: 1769–1770
- Hebrew calendar: 5537–5538
- Hindu calendars
- Vikram Samvat: 1833–1834
- Shaka Samvat: 1698–1699
- Kali Yuga: 4877–4878
- Holocene calendar: 11777
- Igbo calendar: 777–778
- Iranian calendar: 1155–1156
- Islamic calendar: 1190–1191
- Japanese calendar: An'ei 6 (安永６年)
- Javanese calendar: 1702–1703
- Julian calendar: Gregorian minus 11 days
- Korean calendar: 4110
- Minguo calendar: 135 before ROC 民前135年
- Nanakshahi calendar: 309
- Thai solar calendar: 2319–2320
- Tibetan calendar: མེ་ཕོ་སྤྲེ་ལོ་ (male Fire-Monkey); 1903 or 1522 or 750 — to — མེ་མོ་བྱ་ལོ་ (female Fire-Bird); 1904 or 1523 or 751

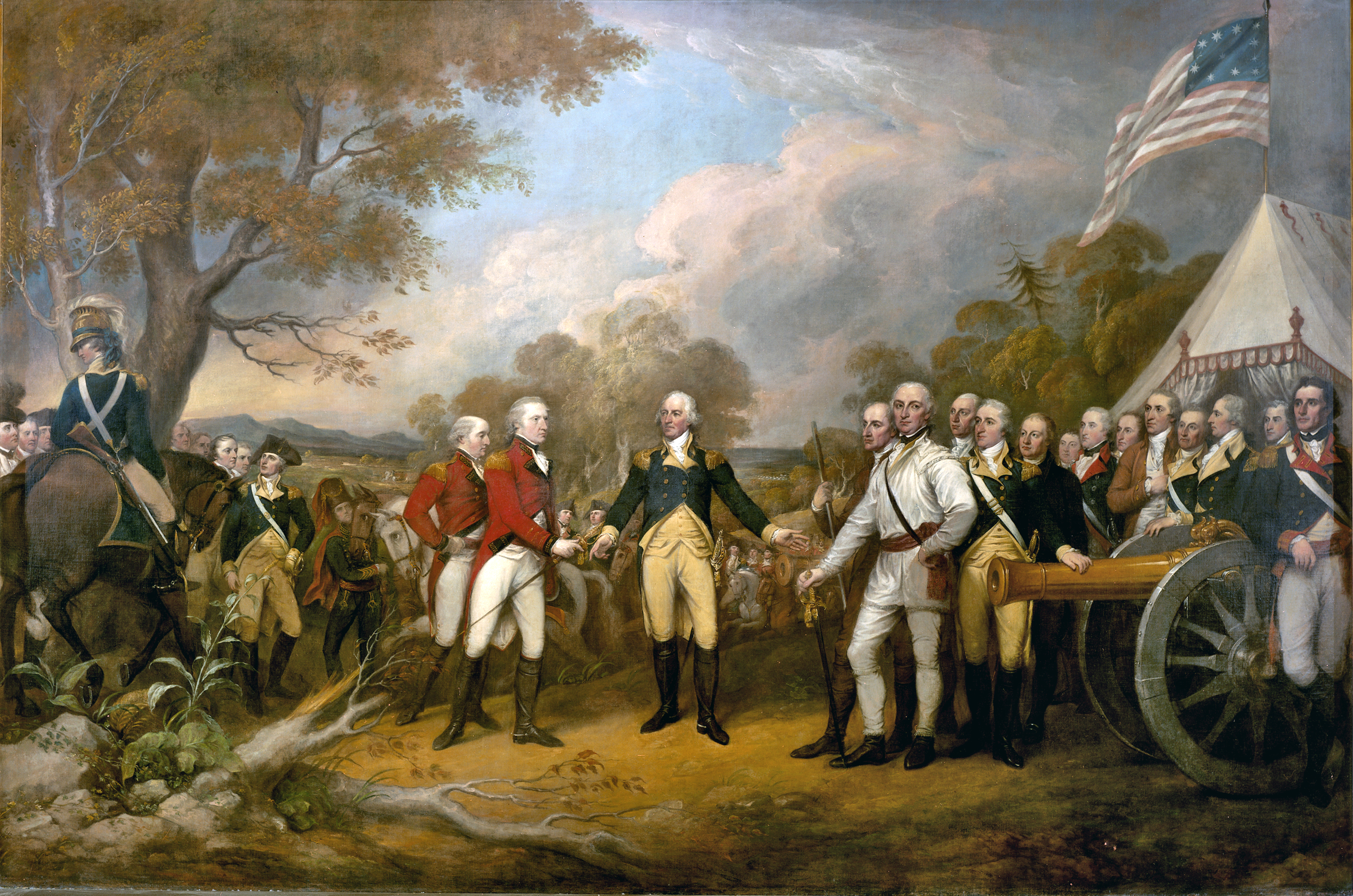
October 17: British General Burgoyne surrenders to Americans after second Battle of Saratoga, marking turning point in American Revolution.

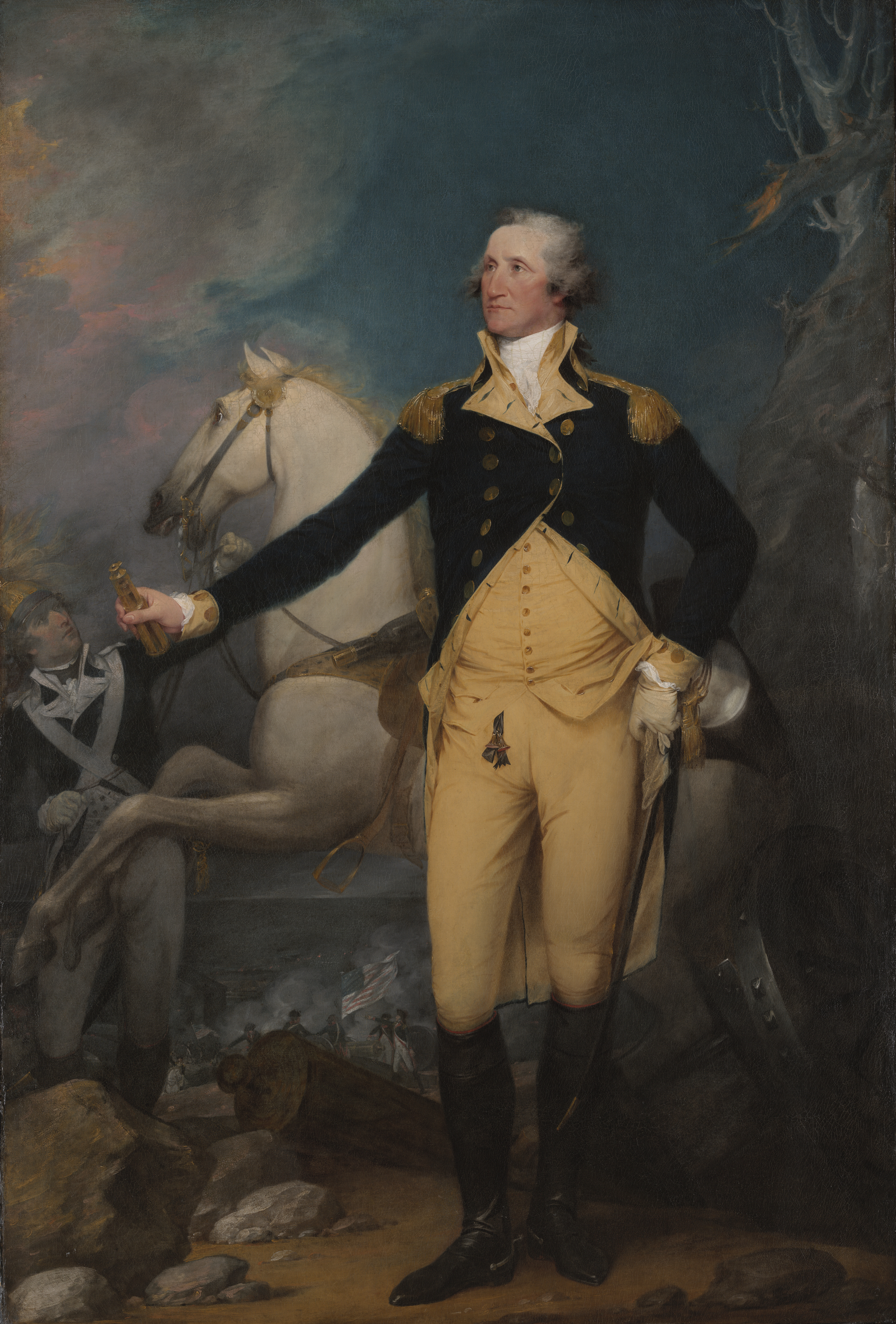
January 2: General George Washington at Trenton

1777 (MDCCLXXVII) was a common year starting on Wednesday of the Gregorian calendar and a common year starting on Sunday of the Julian calendar, the 1777th year of the Common Era (CE) and Anno Domini (AD) designations, the 777th year of the 2nd millennium, the 77th year of the 18th century, and the 8th year of the 1770s decade. As of the start of 1777, the Gregorian calendar was 11 days ahead of the Julian calendar, which remained in localized use until 1923.

== Events ==
=== January–March ===
- January 2 – American Revolutionary War – Battle of the Assunpink Creek: American general George Washington's army repulses a British attack by Lieutenant General Charles Cornwallis, in a second battle at Trenton, New Jersey.
- January 3 – American Revolutionary War – Battle of Princeton: American general George Washington's army defeats British troops.
- January 12 – Mission Santa Clara de Asís is founded in what becomes Santa Clara, California.
- January 15 – Vermont declares its independence from New York, becoming the Vermont Republic, an independent country, a status it retains until it joins the United States as the 14th state in 1791.
- January 21 – The Continental Congress approves a resolution "that an unauthentic copy, with names of the signers of the Declaration of independence, be sent to each of the United States.
- February 5 – Under the 1st Constitution of Georgia, 8 counties are chartered: Burke, Camden, Chatham, Effingham, Glynn, Liberty, Richmond, and Wilkes. This dissolves the existing parishes of St. George, St. Mary's, St. Thomas, St. Phillip, Christ Church, St. David, St. Matthews, St. Andrew, St. James, St. Johns, and St. Paul.
- February 24 – King Joseph I of Portugal dies, and is succeeded by his daughter Maria I of Portugal, and his brother and son-in-law Peter III of Portugal.
- March 4 – The Fourth Continental Congress, with John Hancock as president, begins a 199 day session in Philadelphia, lasting until September 18.
- March 29–30 – Third voyage of James Cook: English explorer Captain Cook discovers Mangaia and Atiu in the Cook Islands.

=== April–June ===
- April 1 – Friedrich Maximilian Klinger's play Sturm und Drang is premiered by the Seyler Theatre Company in Leipzig, giving its name to the whole Sturm und Drang movement in German literature.
- April 13 – American Revolutionary War – Battle of Bound Brook: A British and Hessian force led by Charles Cornwallis surprises a Continental Army outpost in New Jersey, commanded by Major General Benjamin Lincoln.
- April 27 – American Revolutionary War – Battle of Ridgefield: The British Army defeats Patriot militias, galvanizing resistance in the Connecticut Colony.
- May 8 – Richard Brinsley Sheridan's comedy of manners, The School for Scandal, is first performed at the Theatre Royal, Drury Lane in London.
- May 16 – Gwinnett–McIntosh duel: Lachlan McIntosh and Button Gwinnett shoot each other during a duel near Savannah, Georgia. Gwinnett, a signer of the United States Declaration of Independence, dies three days later.
- June 13 – American Revolution: The Marquis de Lafayette lands near Georgetown, South Carolina, to help the Continental Congress train its army.

June 14: US Flag (had various star patterns)

- June 14 – The Stars and Stripes is adopted by the Continental Congress as the flag of the United States.
- June 21 – Encyclopædia Britannica Second Edition begins publication in Edinburgh.

=== July–December ===
- July 6 – American Revolutionary War – Siege of Fort Ticonderoga: After a bombardment by British artillery under General John Burgoyne, American forces retreat from Fort Ticonderoga, New York.
- July 7 – American Revolutionary War – Battle of Hubbardton: British forces capture over 200 of the American rearguard, from Fort Ticonderoga.
- July 8 – The 1777 Constitution of Vermont is signed, officially abolishing slavery.
- August 6 – American Revolutionary War – Battle of Oriskany: Loyalists gain a tactical victory over Patriots; Iroquois fight on both sides.
- August 16 – American Revolutionary War – Battle of Bennington: British and Brunswicker forces are decisively defeated by American troops at Walloomsac, New York.
- August 22 – American Revolutionary War – The Siege of Fort Stanwix is ended by withdrawal of British forces, following a ruse by Benedict Arnold to persuade them that a much larger force is arriving.
- September 3 – American Revolutionary War – Battle of Cooch's Bridge: British and Hessian forces defeat an American militia in a minor skirmish in New Castle County, Delaware.
- September 11 – American Revolutionary War – Battle of Brandywine: The British gain a major victory in Chester County, Pennsylvania.
- September 19 – American Revolutionary War – First Battle of Saratoga (Battle of Freeman's Farm): Patriot forces withstand a British attack at Saratoga, New York.
- September 26 – American Revolutionary War – British troops occupy Philadelphia; members of the Continental Congress flee to Lancaster, Pennsylvania, where they meet and hold a one day session as the Fifth Congress before fleeing again.
- September 30 – American Revolutionary War – The Sixth Continental Congress opens its session at York, Pennsylvania, and continues for 272 days until June 27, 1778.
- October 4 – American Revolutionary War – Battle of Germantown: Troops under George Washington are repelled by British troops under Sir William Howe.
- October 6 – American Revolutionary War – Battle of Forts Clinton and Montgomery: British troops capture Fort Clinton and Fort Montgomery (Hudson River), and are able to dismantle the Hudson River Chain.
- October 7 – American Revolutionary War – Second Battle of Saratoga (Battle of Bemis Heights): British General John Burgoyne is defeated by American troops.
- October 17 – American Revolutionary War – Battle of Saratoga: British General John Burgoyne surrenders to the American troops.
- November 15 – American Revolution: After 16 months of debate, the Continental Congress approves the Articles of Confederation, in the temporary American capital at York, Pennsylvania.
- November 17 – American Revolution: The Articles of Confederation are submitted to the states for ratification.
- November 29 – San Jose, California, is founded. It is the first pueblo in Spanish Alta California.
- December 18 – The United States celebrates its first Thanksgiving, marking October's victory by the American rebels over British General John Burgoyne at Saratoga.
- December 19 – American Revolutionary War – George Washington's Continental Army goes into winter quarters at Valley Forge, Pennsylvania.
- December 20 – Morocco recognizes the United States as a sovereign state.
- December 24 – Third voyage of James Cook: English explorer Captain Cook locates Kiritimati (Christmas Island).
- December 30 – Maximilian III Joseph, Elector of Bavaria dies and is succeeded by his distant cousin Charles Theodore, Elector of Bavaria.

=== Date unknown ===
- The code duello is adopted at the Clonmel Summer Assizes as the form for pistol duels by gentlemen in Ireland. It is quickly denounced, but nevertheless widely adopted throughout the English-speaking world.
- Kunsthochschule Kassel is founded in Germany as a fine arts academy.
- Det Dramatiske Selskab is founded in Copenhagen (Denmark) as an acting academy.
- George II Frederic is crowned as king of the Miskito Kingdom.

== Births ==
=== January–March ===
- January – William Barton, English cricketer (d. 1825)
- January 2 – Christian Daniel Rauch, German sculptor (d. 1857)
- January 7 – Lorenzo Bartolini, Italian sculptor (d. 1850)
- January 11 – Vincenzo Borg, Maltese merchant, rebel leader (d. 1837)
- January 13 – Elisa Bonaparte, Grand Duchess of Tuscany, sister of Napoleon Bonaparte (d. 1820)
- January 25 – Karoline Jagemann, German actor (d.1848)
- February 3 – John Cheyne, British physician, surgeon and author (d. 1836)
- February 10 – Amable Berthelot, Quebec lawyer, author and political figure (d. 1847)
- February 12
  - Friedrich de la Motte Fouqué, French poet (d. 1843)
  - Bernard Courtois, French chemist (d. 1838)
- February 18 – Andreas Arntzen, Norwegian politician (d. 1837)
- February 20 – Zacheus Burnham, Canadian farmer, judge and public figure (d. 1857)
- February 26 – Matija Nenadović, Prime Minister of Serbia (d. 1854)
- March 3 – Adolphe Dureau de la Malle, French geographer, naturalist, historian and artist (d. 1857)
- March 10 – Robert Allison (Pennsylvania politician), U.S. Representative (d. 1840)
- March 13 – Charles Lot Church, Nova Scotia politician (d. 1864)

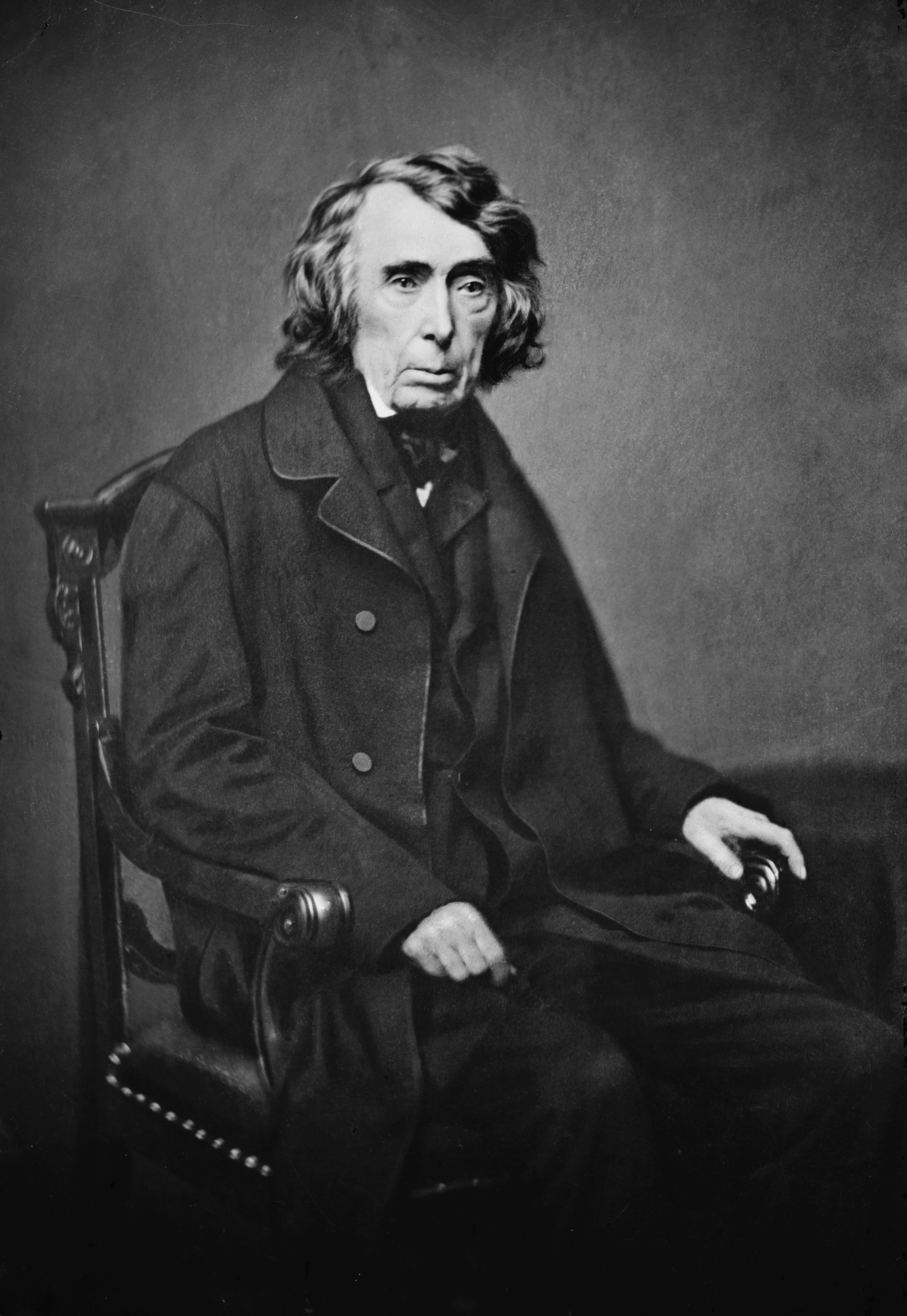
Roger B. Taney

- March 17
  - Patrick Brontë, Irish Anglican curate and writer; father of writers Charlotte, Emily and Anne Brontë (d. 1861)
  - Roger B. Taney, Chief Justice of the United States (d. 1864)
- March 19 – José María Bustamante, Mexican composer (d. 1861)
- March 28 – Antoine Germain Labarraque, French chemist (d. 1850)

=== April–June ===
- April 11 – William Addams, United States Congressman (d. 1858)
- April 12 – Henry Clay, American politician (d. 1852)
- April 16 – John Alexander (Ohio politician), U.S. Representative (d. 1848)

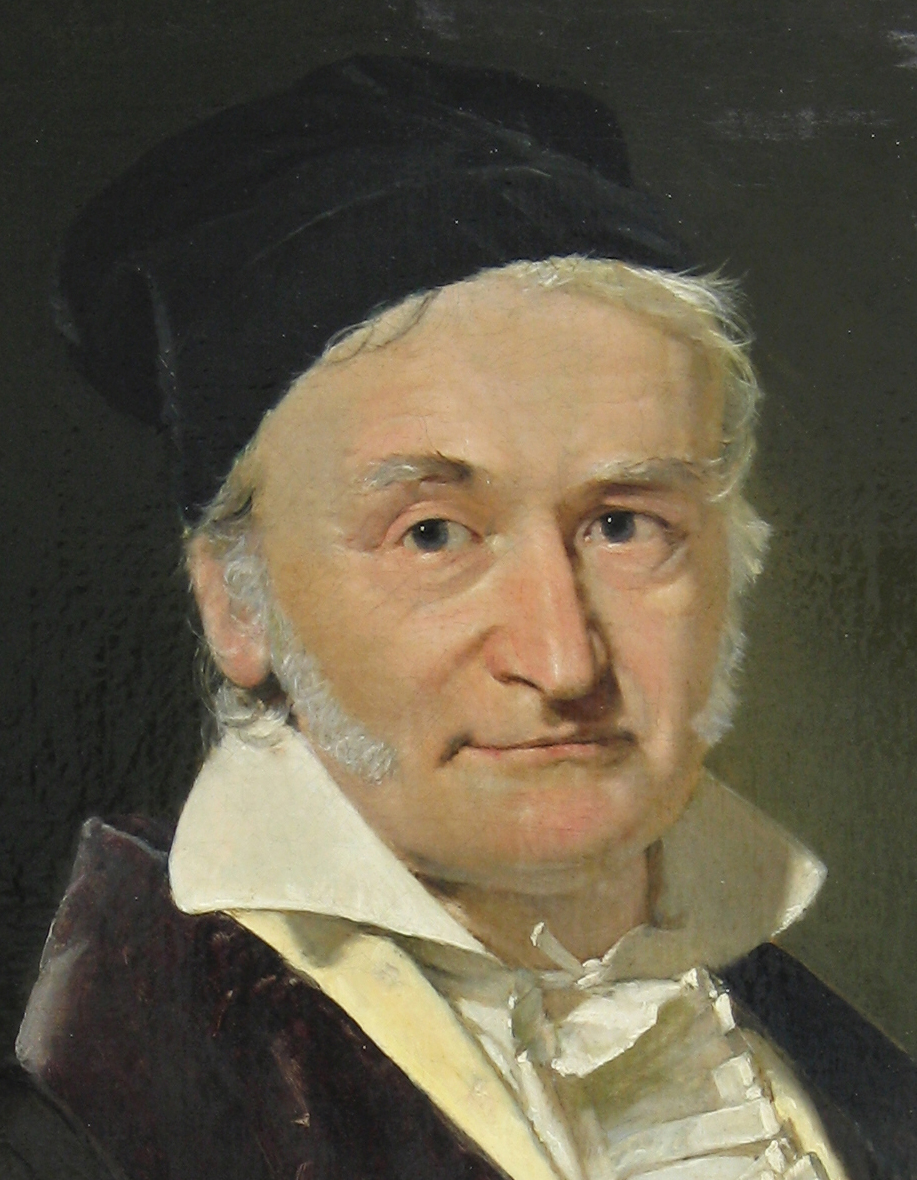
Carl Friedrich Gauss

- April 30 – Carl Friedrich Gauss, German mathematician, astronomer and physicist (d. 1855)
- May 4 – Richard Bourke, Australian governor (d. 1855)
- May 8 – Mateli Magdalena Kuivalatar, Finnish-Karelian folksinger (d. 1846)
- May 11 – Samuel Bridger, English cricketer
- May 12 – Mary Reibey, Australian businessperson (d. 1855)
- May 18 – John George Children, British chemist, mineralogist and zoologist (d. 1852)
- June 1 – Fernando Errázuriz Aldunate, president of Chile (d. 1841)
- June 12 – Robert Clark, American politician (d. 1837)
- June 14 – Heman Allen (of Milton), U.S. Representative (d. 1844)
- June 15 – David Daniel Davis, British physician (d. 1841)
- June 22
  - Andrzej Alojzy Ankwicz, Polish-born Catholic archbishop of Prague (d. 1838)
  - William Brown (admiral), Irish-born first admiral of Argentina (d. 1857)
- June 23 – Frederick Bates, American politician (d. 1825)

=== July–September ===
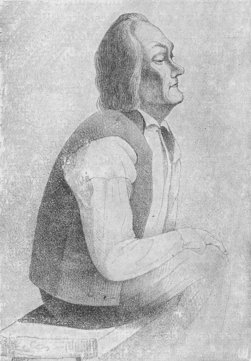
Paavo Ruotsalainen

- July – Thomas Clayton, American lawyer, politician (d. 1854)
- July 9
  - Henry Hallam, English historian (d. 1859)
  - Paavo Ruotsalainen, Finnish farmer and lay preacher (d. 1852)
- July 23 – Philipp Otto Runge, German painter (d. 1810)
- July 26 – Robert Hamilton Bishop, Scottish-American educator, minister (d. 1855)
- July 27
  - Heinrich Wilhelm Brandes, German physicist (d. 1834)
  - Thomas Campbell, Scottish poet (d. 1844)
  - Henry Trevor, 21st Baron Dacre, British peer, soldier (d. 1853)
- July 31 – Pedro Ignacio de Castro Barros, Argentine statesman, priest (d. 1849)
- August 11 – Giuseppe Bossi, Italian painter (d. 1815)
- August 12 – George Wolf, American politician (d. 1840)

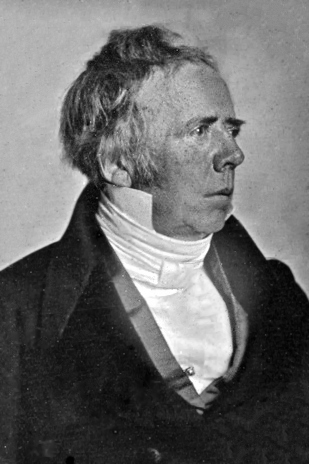
Hans Christian Ørsted

- August 14 – Hans Christian Ørsted, Danish physicist and chemist (d. 1851)
- August 23 – Princess Adélaïde of Orléans, French princess (d. 1847)
- August 29 – Nikita Bichurin (Hyacinth), Russian monk (d. 1853)
- August 30 – Parashuramrao Shrinivas I, Indian nobleman (d. 1848)
- August 31 – Alexander Bashilov, Russian general (d. 1847)
- September 9 – James Carr (Massachusetts politician), U.S. Congressman (d. 1818)
- September 12 – Henri Marie Ducrotay de Blainville, French zoologist, anatomist (d. 1850)
- September 25 – Joseph Badeaux, Canadian politician (d. 1835)

=== October–December ===
- October 1 – Zaro Aga, Turkish-Kurdish possible supercentenarian (claimed to have been born this year or 1774; d. 1934)
- October 5 – Guillaume Dupuytren, French anatomist, military surgeon (d. 1835)
- October 16
  - Levi Barber, American surveyor, court administrator, banker and legislator (d. 1833)
  - Lorenzo Dow, American Methodist preacher (d. 1834)
- October 18
  - Auguste François-Marie de Colbert-Chabanais, French general (d. 1809)

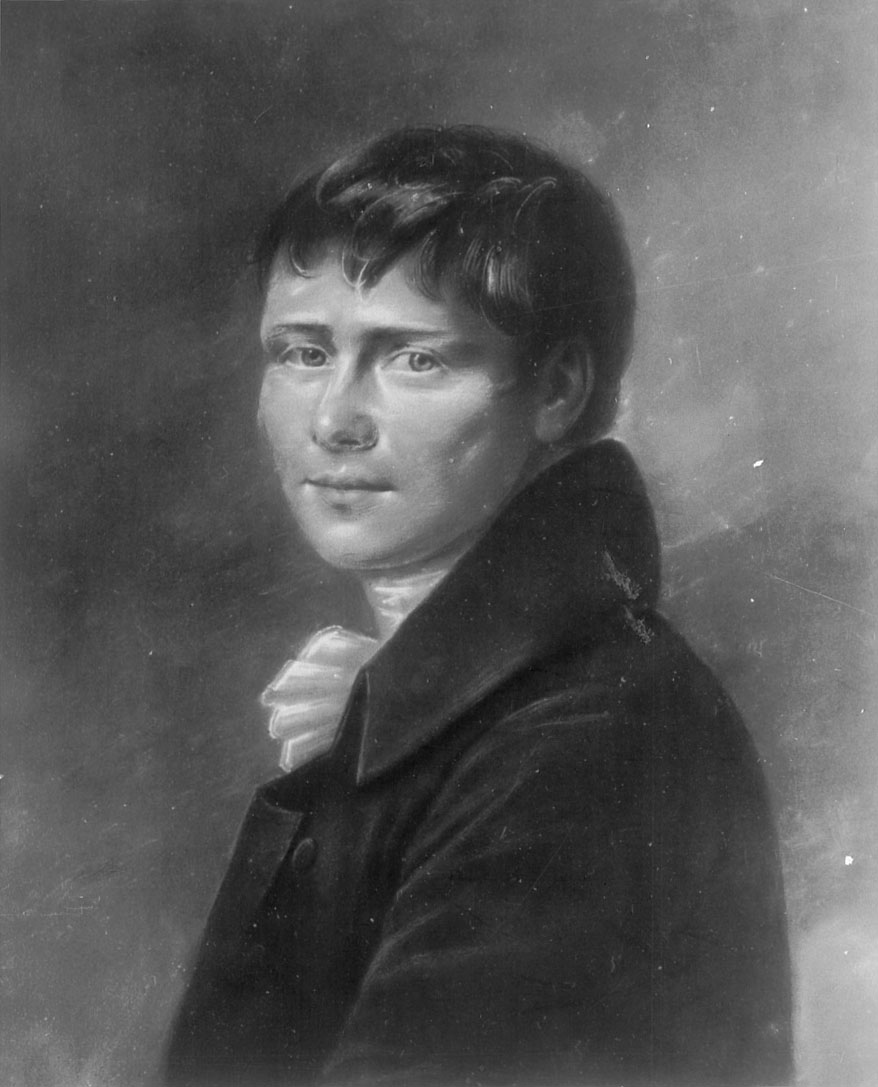
Heinrich von Kleist

  - Heinrich von Kleist, German poet, dramatist, novelist and short story writer (d. 1811)
- November 7 – Richard Bassett (clergyman), Welsh cleric (d. 1852)
- November 13 – Kunwar Singh, Leader during the Indian Rebellion of 1857 (d. 1858)
- November 14 – Nathaniel Claiborne, American politician (d. 1859)
- November 24 – Samuel Butts, American militia officer (d. 1814)
- December 1 – Thomas Bradford, British Army officer (d. 1853)
- December 4 – Juliette Récamier, French writer (d. 1849)
- December 10 – William Conner, American trader, politician (d. 1855)
- December 14 – Du Pré Alexander, 2nd Earl of Caledon, Irish peer, landlord and colonial administrator (d. 1839)
- December 15 – Agostino Aglio, Italian painter, decorator and engraver (d. 1857)
- December 16 – Madame Clicquot Ponsardin, French champagne producer (d. 1866)
- December 21 – John Campbell, 7th Duke of Argyll, Scottish peer, Whig politician (d. 1847)

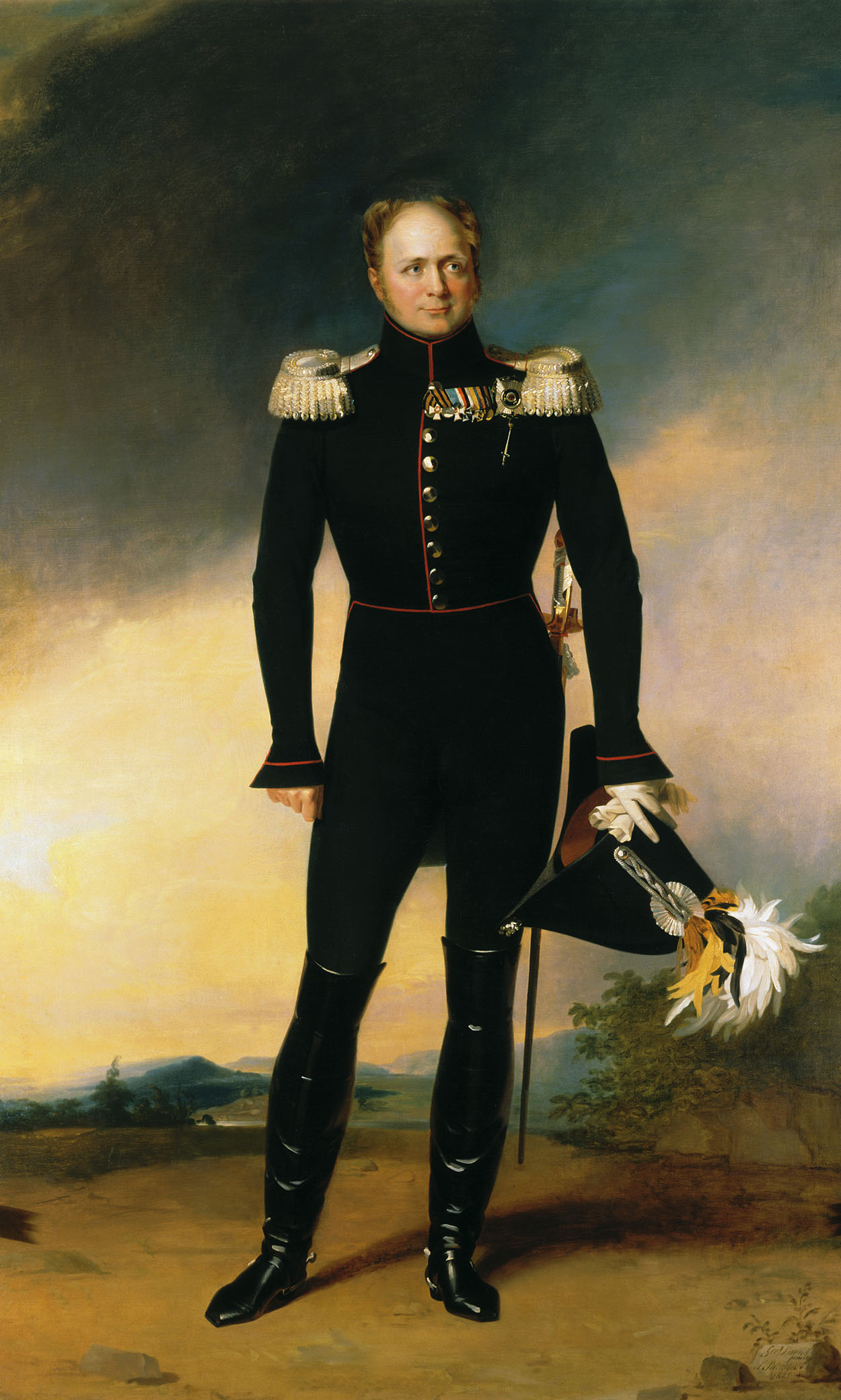
Alexander I of Russia

- December 23 – Emperor Alexander I of Russia, Russian officer (d. 1825)
- December 24 – Barbara Spooner Wilberforce, wife of English abolitionist William Wilberforce (d. 1847)

=== Date unknown ===
- Suleiman al-Halabi, Syrian student, assassin (d. 1800)
- Carlos Anaya, Uruguayan politician (d. 1862)
- Charles James Apperley, English sportsman, sporting writer (d. 1843)
- Carlo Armellini, Italian politician, activist and jurist (d. 1863)
- Mevlana Halid-i Bagdadi, Ottoman mystic (d. 1826)
- Connell James Baldwin, Irish soldier, civil servant (d. 1861)
- Karl Friedrich Becker, German educator, historian (d. 1806)
- Vicente Benavides, Chilean soldier (d. 1822)
- John Bennett (Hampshire cricketer) (d. 1857)
- William Bellinger Bulloch, U.S. Senator (d. 1852)
- Sophia Campbell, Australian artist (d. 1833)
- Abiel Chandler, U.S. philanthropist (d. 1851)
- John Claiborne, U.S. politician (d. 1808)
- Charles Othon Frédéric Jean-Baptiste de Clarac, French artist, scholar and archaeologist (d. 1847)
- Thomas Cochran (judge), Canadian judge (d. 1804)
- Anselmo de la Cruz, Chilean political figure (d. 1833)
- Thomas Day, American judge (d. 1855)
- Benjamin D'Urban, British general, colonial administrator (d. 1849)
- Tu'i Malila, Malagasy-born tortoise, longest living animal on record (d. 1965)

== Deaths ==
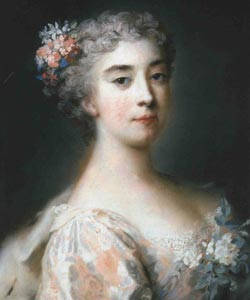
Enrichetta d'Este

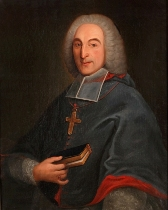
Pierre-Herman Dosquet

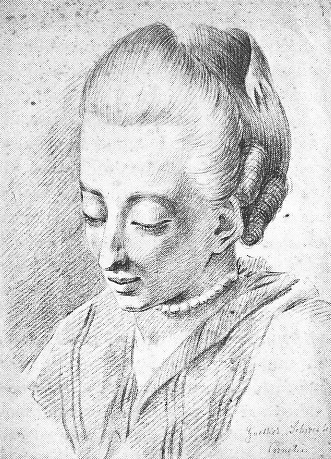
Cornelia Schlosser

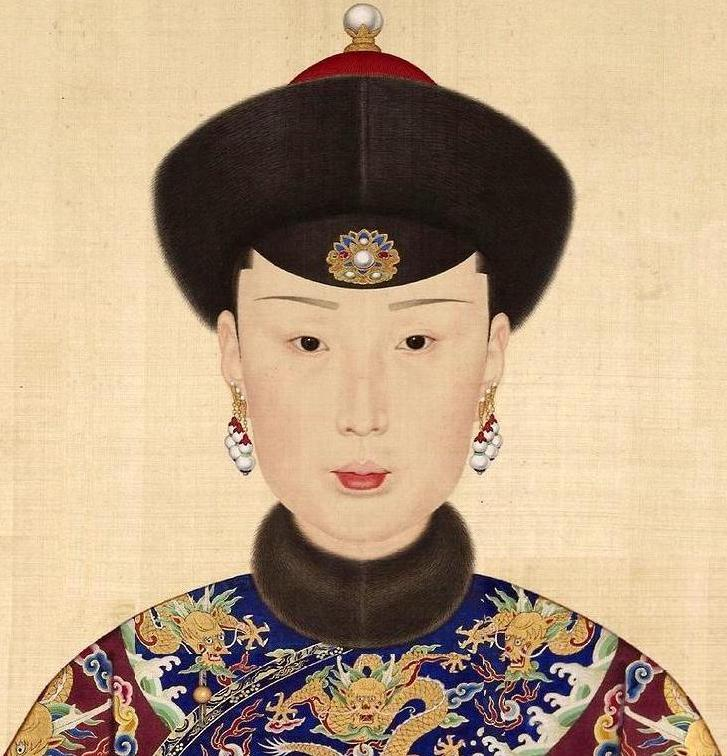
Consort Shu

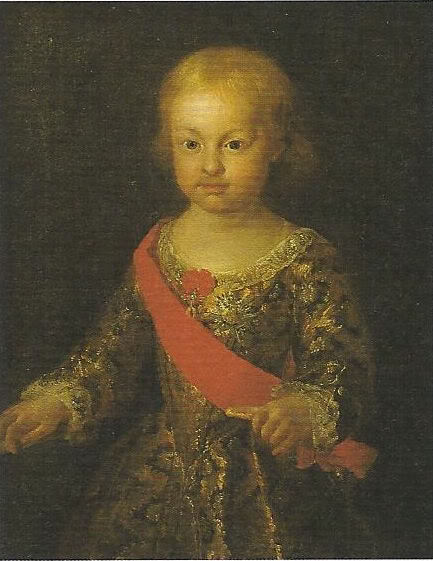
Infante Philip, Duke of Calabria

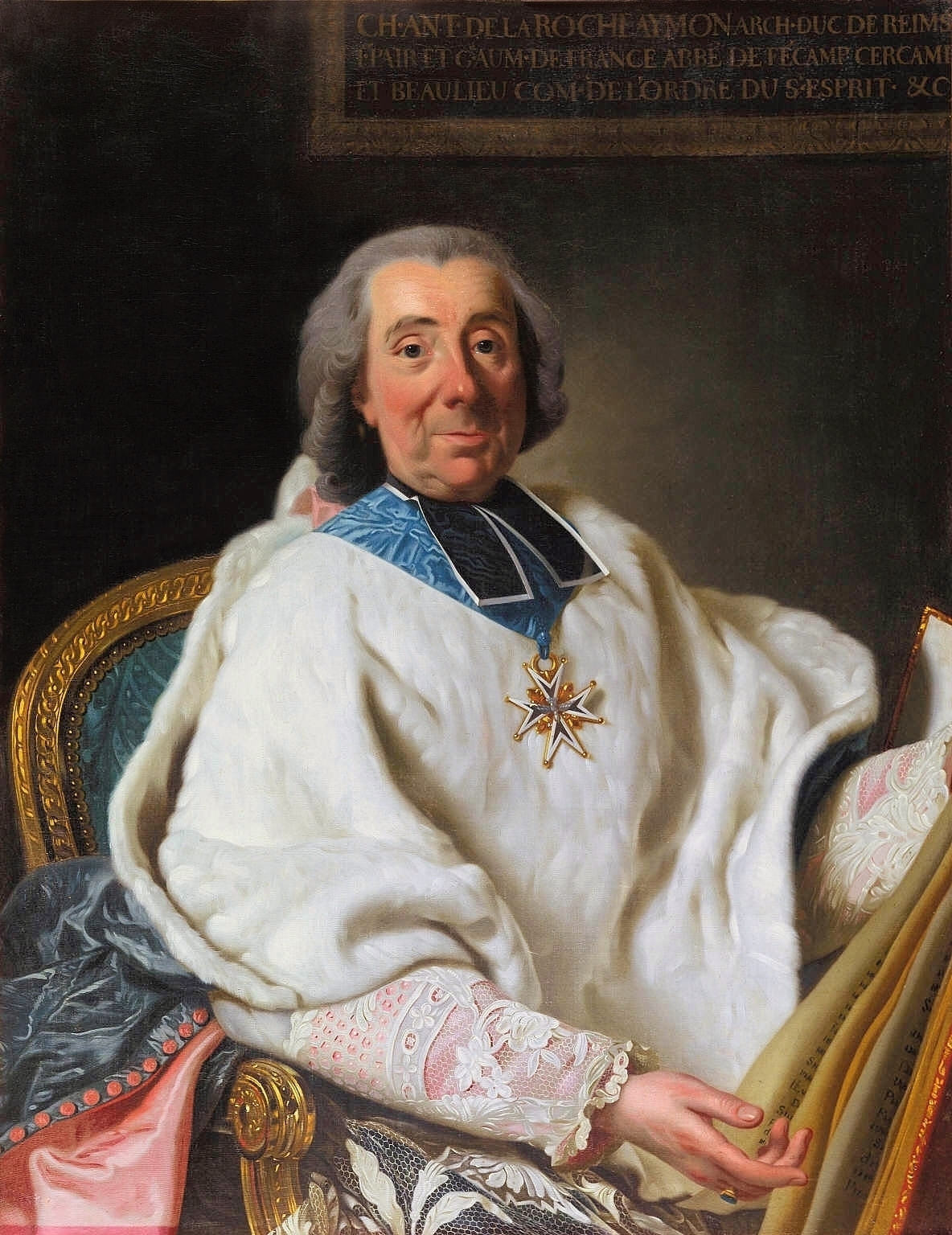
Charles Antoine de La Roche-Aymon

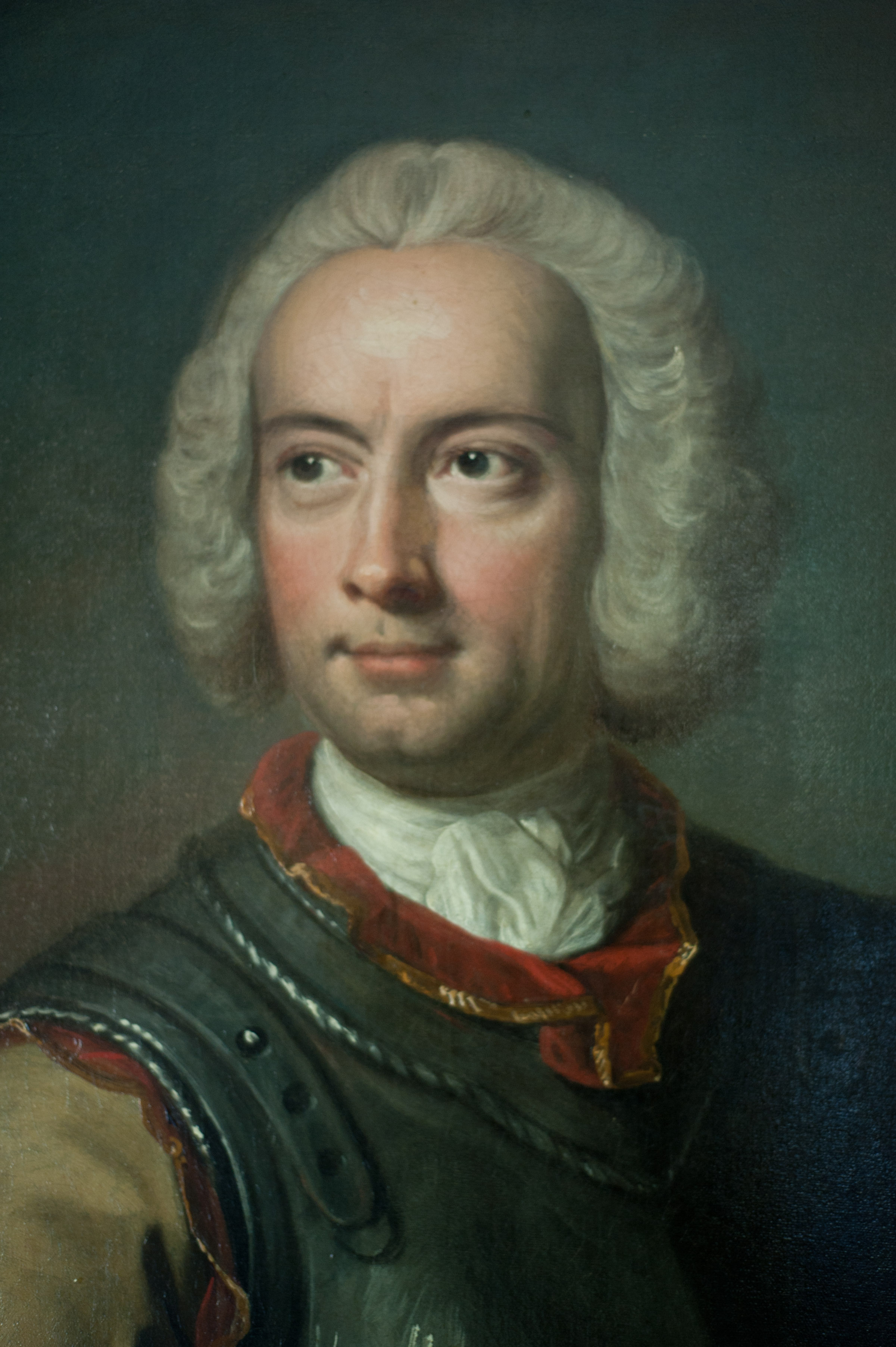
Sir Charles Knowles, 1st Baronet

=== January–March ===
- January 10 – Spranger Barry, Irish actor (b. 1719)
- January 12 – Hugh Mercer, American Revolutionary War officer, mortally wounded in battle (b. 1726)
- January 13 – James Rait, Anglican clergyman, Scottish Episcopal Church Bishop of Brechin 1742–1777 (b. 1689)
- January 27 – Hubert de Brienne, French naval commander (b. 1690)
- January 30 – Enrichetta d'Este, Duchess of Parma (b. 1702)
- February 9
  - Captain Abraham Godwin, American marine on USS Washington (1776 row galley) (b. 1724)
  - Seth Pomeroy, American gunsmith and soldier (b. 1706)
- February 11 – Sir Gilbert Elliot, 3rd Baronet, of Minto, Scottish statesman, philosopher and poet (b. 1722)
- February 24 – King Joseph I of Portugal (b. 1714)
- February 28 – Joab Hoisington, American major (b. 1736)
- March 1
  - Józef Aleksander Jabłonowski, Polish nobleman (szlachcic) (b. 1711)
  - Georg Christoph Wagenseil, Austrian composer (b. 1715)
- March 2 – Empress Xiaoshengxian, mother of the Chinese Qianlong Emperor of China (b. 1692)
- March 4 – Pierre-Herman Dosquet, 4th bishop of Quebec (b. 1691)
- March 6 – Jeremias Friedrich Reuß, German theologian (b. 1700)
- March 10 – John the Painter, British criminal (b. 1752)
- March 20 – Jean-François-Joseph de Rochechouart, French Roman Catholic Cardinal (b. 1708)
- March 23 – Sir Hugh Paterson, 2nd Baronet, Scottish Jacobite and Member of the Parliament of Great Britain (b. 1685)
- March 31 – Richard Terrick, Church of England clergyman, Bishop of Peterborough 1757–1764 and Bishop of London 1764–1777 (b. 1710)

=== April–June ===
- April 7 – Anna Chamber, British noblewoman and poet (b. 1709)
- April 29 – Antonio Joli, Italian painter of vedute and capricci (b. 1700)
- May 5 – Raphael Hayyim Isaac Carregal, Palestinian rabbi preaching in the Americas (b. 1733)
- May 7 – Jean-Baptiste Nicolas Roch de Ramezay, marine captain and colonial administrator in New France (b. 1708)
- May 9 – Heneage Finch, 3rd Earl of Aylesford, Member of the Parliament of Great Britain (b. 1715)
- May 11 – George Pigot, 1st Baron Pigot, British governor of Madras (b. 1719)
- May 19 – Button Gwinnett, a signatory of the American Declaration of Independence (b. 1735)
- May 22 – David Wooster, American general in the French and Indian War and in the American Revolutionary War (b. 1711)
- May 28 – William Douglas, American military officer, leading regiments from Connecticut in the American Revolutionary War (b. 1742)
- May 31 – Henry Fane of Wormsley, English politician (b. 1703)
- June 8 – Cornelia Schlosser, sister and only sibling of Johann Wolfgang von Goethe to survive to adulthood (b. 1750)
- June 21 – Georg Friedrich Meier, German philosopher and aesthetician (b. 1718)

=== July–September ===
- July 4 – Consort Shu, consort of the Chinese Qianlong Emperor (b. 1728)
- July 13 – Guillaume Coustou the Younger, French artist (b. 1716)
- August 14
  - Karl Wilhelm von Dieskau, Prussian lieutenant general and general inspector of the artillery (b. 1701)
  - Otto Magnus von Schwerin, Prussian general in the army of Frederick the Great (b. 1701)
- August 23 – Celia Grillo Borromeo, Italian scientist, mathematician (b. 1684)
- August 30 – John Clavering, British Army officer (b. 1722)
- September 7 – Tekle Haymanot II, emperor of Ethiopia (b. 1754)
- September 16 – Simon Harcourt, 1st Earl Harcourt, English landowner, diplomat, general and Viceroy of India (b. 1714)
- September 18 – Princess Amalia of Nassau-Dietz, wife of Frederick (b. 1710)
- September 19 – Infante Philip, Duke of Calabria (b. 1747)
- September 20 – Edward Howard, 9th Duke of Norfolk, British peer (b. 1686)
- September 22 – John Bartram, American botanist (b. 1699)
- September 25 – Johann Heinrich Lambert, Swiss mathematician, physicist and astronomer (b. 1728)

=== October–December ===
- October 3 – Jeremias van Riemsdijk, Dutch colonial governor (b. 1712)
- October 4 – Francis Nash, American brigadier general, killed at the Battle of Germantown (b. c. 1742)
- October 6 – Marie Thérèse Rodet Geoffrin, French salon holder (b. 1699)
- October 7 – Simon Fraser of Balnain, Scottish general during the American Revolutionary War, killed in battle (b. 1729)
- October 21 – Samuel Foote, English dramatist and actor (b. 1720)
- October 22 – Friedrich Baum, German dragoon Lieutenant Colonel of Brunswick in British service during the American Revolutionary War (b. 1748)
- October 25 – Carl von Donop, Hessian colonel fighting in the American Revolutionary War (b. 1732)
- October 27 – Charles Antoine de La Roche-Aymon, French cardinal-archbishop and Grand Almoner (b. 1697)
- October 30 – John Hart, American militia officer during King George's War and the French and Indian War (b. 1706)
- November 1 – Jonathan Hampton, American colonial surveyor (b. 1712)
- November 6 – Bernard de Jussieu, French naturalist (b. 1699)
- November 10 – Cornstalk, Shawnee chief (b. c. 1720)
- November 13 – William Bowyer, English printer (b. 1699)
- November 17 – Pratap Singh Shah, 2nd king of Nepal (b. 1751)
- November 18 – Thomas Foley, 1st Baron Foley, English landowner and politician (b. 1716)
- December 9 – Sir Charles Knowles, 1st Baronet, British Royal Navy officer (b. c. 1704)
- December 12 – Albrecht von Haller, Swiss anatomist and physiologist (b. 1708)
- December 25 – Charles Chauncey, English physician (b. 1706)
- December 26
  - Dolly Pentreath, last-known fluent native speaker of the Cornish language (b. 1692)
  - Ricardo Wall, Spanish-Irish cavalry officer (b. 1694)
- December 27 – Frederick Keppel, Church of England clergyman (b. 1728)
- December 30 – Maximilian III Joseph, Elector of Bavaria, Prince-elector of the Holy Roman Empire and Duke of Bavaria 1745–1777 (b. 1727)
