= Dathan (surname) =

Dathan is a surname. Notable people with the surname include:

- Johann Georg Dathan (1701–1749), German painter
- Lucy Dathan, American politician
