= Louis Daniel Arnault de Nobleville =

French physician and naturalist

Louis Daniel Arnault de Nobleville (21 December 1701, Orléans – 1 February 1778) was a French physician and naturalist.

Louis Daniel Arnault de Nobleville was born into an orléanaise family whose wealth came from sugar refinery. He studied medicine in Reims and in 1744 entered the Collège de Médecine d'Orléans where he undertook research with François Salerne (1705–1760). He was charged by the Généralité d'Orléans with preventing and fighting epidemic disease and became a Correspondant of the Société royale de Médecine shortly after its foundation. Aside from medicine he was interested in music and natural history.

He also played the viola da gamba.

== Works ==
- Aëdologie, ou Traité du rossignol franc, ou chanteur... (later translated into German and Dutch)
- 1756 Histoire naturelle des animaux Desaint et Saillant, Paris
- Manuel des Dames de charité, ou Formules de médicamens faciles à préparer, dressées en faveur des personnes charitables.
