= Bernard of Bologna =

Italian theologian (1701–1770)

Bernard of Bologna (b. Flovitano Toselli; December 17, 1701 – February 19, 1770), also known as Bernardine, was a Friar Minor Capuchin and Scotist theologian and author.

== Biography ==
Bernard of Bologna was born in Bologna, Italy. In 1717, he entered the Capuchin Order and some years later filled successively the office of professor of moral and dogmatic theology. Several times he held positions of responsibility.

== Works ==
Perhaps the best known of Bernard of Bologna's writings is the Bibliotheca Scriptorum O. Min. S. Francisci Cap., a work which resembles Wadding's well-known Scriptores Ord. Min. It was published at Venice in 1747, and an appendix appeared at Rome in 1852.

Besides this work, Bernard wrote an elementary treatise on philosophy according to Duns Scotus, entitled Institutio Philosophica praemittenda theologiae (Venice, 1766).

Further, he left a treatise on dogmatic theology, Institutio Theologica (Venice, 1746).

He is also the author of a Phrasarium S. Scripturae composed for the use of preachers and authors.
