= Antonio Alcalde Barriga =

Spanish Roman Catholic prelate

Servant of God Antonio Alcalde Barriga OP
- Bishop of Guadalajara
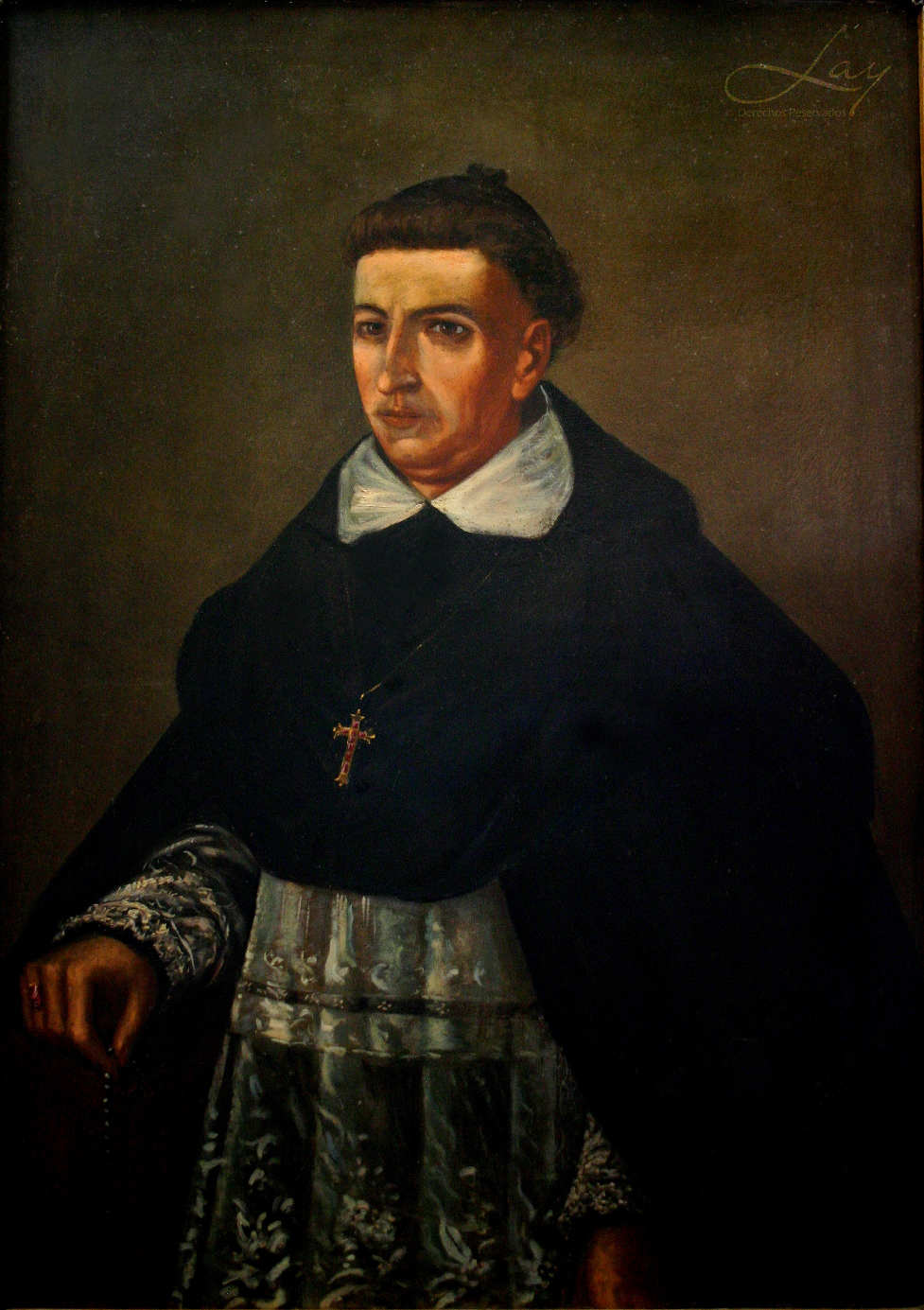
- Portrait.
- Church: Roman Catholic Church
- Diocese: Guadalajara
- See: Guadalajara
- Appointed: 20 May 1771
- Installed: 19 August 1771
- Term ended: 7 August 1792
- Predecessor: Diego Rodríguez de Rivas Velasco
- Successor: Esteban Lorenzo de Tristán Esmenota
- Previous post: Bishop of Yucatán (1762-71)

Orders
- Ordination: 1725
- Consecration: 8 May 1763 by Manuel de Sosa Béthencourt

Personal details
- Born: Antonio Alcalde Barriga; 14 March 1701 Cigales, Valladolid, Kingdom of Spain
- Died: 7 August 1792 (aged 91) Guadalajara, Jalisco, Mexico

Antonio Alcalde Barriga (14 March 1701 - 7 August 1792) was a Spanish Roman Catholic prelate and professed member from the Order of Preachers who served as the Bishop of Guadalajara. He served in Dominicans convents across his homeland for over three decades as a teacher and prior before King Carlos III appointed him to a diocese in Mexico where he would be until being relocated to Guadalajara. It was there that his main legacies included the hospital and college he helped found there in addition to his dedication to restoring and constructing churches and schools.

His beatification process opened in late 1994 and he became titled as a Servant of God. The cause later stalled due to low promotion and little interest though was resumed in 2013 upon new impetus for promoting his life and holiness.

== Life ==
Antonio Alcalde Barriga was born on 14 March 1701 in Cigales in the Valladolid province in the Kingdom of Spain as the fourth and final child of José Alcalde and Isabel Barriga Balboa (who had been married since 1691). His paternal priest uncle Antonio Alcalde baptized him on 3 April in the Santiago Apóstol parish church. His siblings preceding him were his brothers Fernando and Pedro and his sister Inés. His mother died (29.7.1701) when she was 35 which left the children in the care of their father. He had worked on the farm during his childhood and worked with cattle while his father and uncle were responsible for his religious upbringing; his uncle encouraged his educational pursuits. In his childhood he had a habit of remaining long hours in the church that he would sometimes fall asleep which angered the sacristan. The sacristan would be forced to escort him home and this would prompt his parents to reprimand him for his behavior.

He entered the Order of Preachers after he turned sixteen in 1717 in the San Pablo convent in Valladolid where he later assumed the religious habit in 1718. Alcalde studied Latin during his period of the novitiate. He was ordained a deacon either in late 1724 or at the beginning of 1725 while the San Pablo convent prior Francisco de Fuentes asked the Dominican prior general Juan de Ferry on 29 March 1725 that Alcalde be ordained as a priest. His ordination was celebrated sometime in mid or late 1725 in his home province. He served as the prior for several Dominican convents following his ordination from 1725 to 1762 while he served some of that time serving as a teacher for seminarians and novices in the convents he was stationed at from 1727 to 1753. Alcalde received his master's degree in 1751 around the time he was appointed as the prior for the Santo Domingo convent in Zamora. He served as the prior for the Jesús María o de Nuestra Señora de Valverde convent (seven kilometers outside of Madrid) from 13 May 1753.

King Charles III - in July 1760 - travelled the slopes of Valverde and rested at the convent when he began feeling fatigued; it was there that he met and became impressed with Alcalde for his virtue and for his organizational abilities. The king later on 18 September 1761 made him the Bishop of Yucatán in Mexico and so he served as its bishop. The Dominicans were ignorant of this decision prior to the release of the official proclamation and in the meantime had sent Alcalde as the prior for the Santa Cruz de Segovia convent in the summer of 1761. Pope Clement XIII confirmed this appointment four months later in 1762 and he received his episcopal consecration in mid-1863 in the Cartagena de Indias cathedral before setting sail for Mexico for his new mission where he was enthroned on 1 August 1763. He studied the Mayan language when he arrived in Mexico.

Alcalde was appointed as the Bishop of Guadalajara on 20 May 1771 after it had been vacant for little over five months and had the canon Manuel Colón de Larreátegui take possession of the see on his behalf on 19 August 1771. He arrived in Guadalajara on 12 December 1771 to commence his pastoral duties in his new diocese. His two main legacies best remembered are the San Miguel Hospital and the Universidad de Guadalajara (obtaining approval for the college's construction in 1791 from King Charles IV) as he helped to found both during his episcopate. The hospital would be inaugurated on 5 November 1792 which would be three months after the bishop's death. The bishop's tenure was marked with a dedication to construct and restore churches across the large diocese which also extended to convents and schools since he had made education in the faith one of his main priorities.

The people came to respect their bishop and knew him best for his gentle and affable attitude while noting him as a jovial but direct individual. He had a bed of simple sheepskin on the bare ground and would use wood as his pillow. He wore a rough blanket in the winter and fasted often. He often fed on vegetables but would sometimes add meat to his meal on some occasions.

Alcalde died on 4 August 1792 in Guadalajara and his remains were buried in the diocese.

== Beatification process ==
In 1992 calls for his beatification process were made and the cause launched in the Guadalajara archdiocese on 15 October 1994. The official introduction to the cause came on 17 December 1994 after the Congregation for the Causes of Saints issued the official "nihil obstat" (no objections to the cause) edict and titled Alcalde as a Servant of God. The cause stalled due to a lack of promotion and waning interest though was revitalized in 2013 due to the efforts of Fr. Tomás de Hijar Ornelas.
