= Maurus Xaverius Herbst =

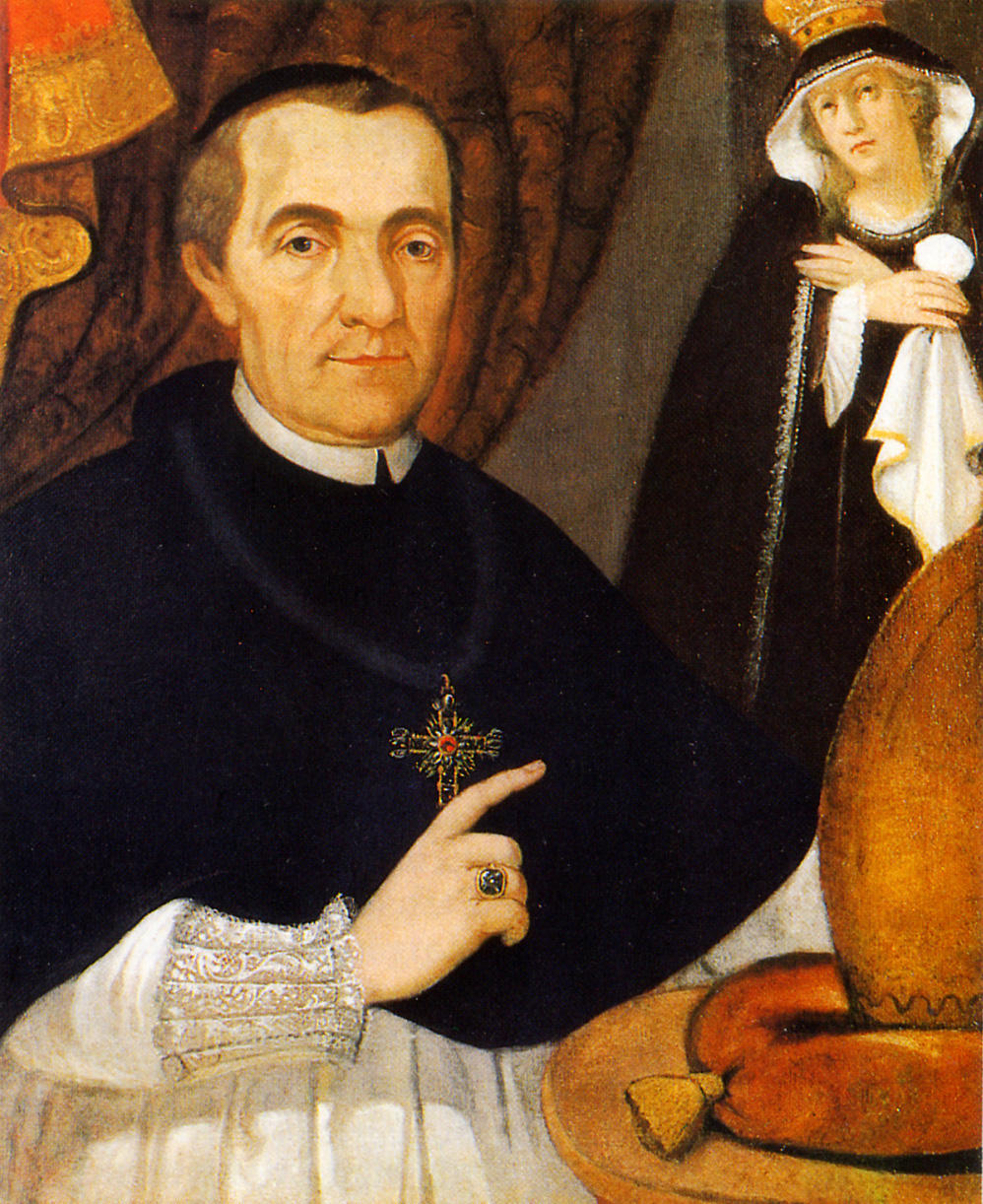
- Born: 14 September 1701; Pleinfeld
- Died: 4 April 1757 (aged 55); Abenberg

Maurus Xaverius Herbst or Florian Johann Friedrich Herbst (14 September 1701 – 4 April 1757) was a German Benedictine abbot.

Herbst was born in Pleinfeld to Franz Herbst (died 1731) and Anna Maria Clara Herbst (née Gulden). In 1704 his home town of Pleinfeld was under French occupation during the Spanish War of Succession. When the imperial troops, who had been quartered in the village, had to retreat, one of the soldiers took the young Herbst with them. He returned to his family three days later.

On 24 September 1742 Herbst was elected abbot of Plankstetten Abbey and he was consecrated on 30 September. He died on 1757 in Abenberg during an exorcism. He was buried at Plankstetten Abbey.

After him, a kindergarten and a street were named his home town of Pleinfeld and a street in Plankstetten. In the diocese of Eichstätt, there is a veneration of saints around Maurus Xaverius, as he is attributed several healings. His feast day is 4 April.
