= Sebastian Redford =

English Jesuit

Sebastian Redford (27 April 1701 – 2 January 1763) was an English Jesuit.

== Life ==
Educated at St. Omer, Watten, and Liège, he became a Jesuit and lived as chaplain with the Wrights of Kelvedon, then with the Herberts of Powis (1733–48).

Redford was much trusted by the second Marquess of Powis (died 1745), but the third was unfriendly. When he died (1748), a Protestant succeeded, the chaplaincy lapsed, and Redford had, as he says, "to rue the ruin" of his former flock. He was next stationed at Croxteth, the seat of Lord Molineux.

== Works ==
While at Croxteth, he published "An important Enquiry; or the Nature of Church Reformation fully considered" (1751). The book was a success, but the excise officers seized and destroyed 400 copies, the last half of the edition. A second and enlarged edition appeared in 1758.

Many Redford's letters were preserved by the English Jesuits.
