= Ignatius of Laconi =

Christian saint

Saint Ignatius of Laconi OFMCap

Religious
- Born: 10 December 1701; Laconi, Kingdom of Sardinia
- Died: 11 May 1781 (aged 79); Cagliari, Kingdom of Sardinia
- Venerated in: Catholic Church
- Beatified: 16 June 1940, Saint Peter's Basilica, Vatican City by Pope Pius XII
- Canonized: 21 October 1951, Saint Peter's Basilica, Vatican City by Pope Pius XII
- Feast: 11 May
- Attributes: Franciscan habit
- Patronage: Oristano; Students; Beggars

Ignazio da Laconi (Sardinian: Ignatziu dae Làconi), born Francesco Ignazio Vincenzo Peis in Sardinia, (10 December 1701 - 11 May 1781), was a Capuchin friar. His conquering a serious illness prompted him to consecrate his life to God and therefore entered the religious life though not as an ordained priest. Peis was better known in Sardinia for his humble demeanor coupled with his concern for those who were poor. He mingled with all the people he met and was generous towards those who were ill. But he became known as a wonder worker, and it was claimed that he had performed 121 miracles during his life.

Ignazio da Laconi's grave soon became a place where miracles reportedly flourished, and this was one dimension towards the opening of his cause for canonization. He was beatified on 16 June 1940 and was canonized in 1951. His body in Cagliari is still incorrupt.

== Life ==
Vincenzo Peis was born on 10 December 1701 in Sardinia, the second of seven children of poor peasants Mattia Peis Cadello and Anna Maria Sanna Casu. He was baptized as Francesco Ignazio Vincenzo since he was born of a difficult pregnancy in which his mother invoked the intercession of Francis of Assisi.

Peis worked in the fields to help support his parents. He suffered a serious illness ca. 1719 (aged seventeen) that made him vow that he would consecrate himself to God and join the Order of Friars Minor Capuchin if he managed to recover from it. He recovered but put off the fulfilment of the vow after his father convinced him to wait; his father was anxious about it because he depended on Peis for support in the fields. But there seems to be some indication that his parents objected to his entering the order. In 1721, he was in danger once more when the horse he was riding panicked. He could have been thrown off, but he called upon the assistance of Francis of Assisi and renewed the vow he had made during his illness. This time, his parents did not raise objections to his becoming a friar and granted him their blessing. In his childhood, he often called the local church his "home" and took Lawrence of Brindisi as his personal role model.

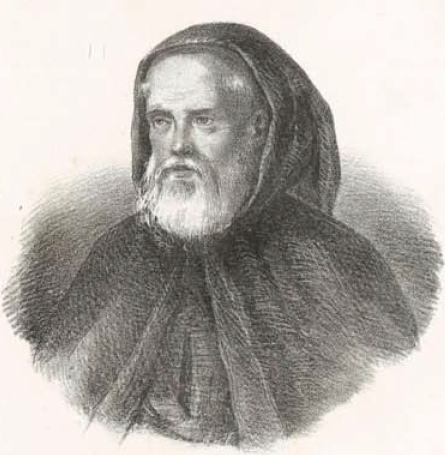
Santo Ignazio da Laconi

He asked for admission at the convent in Cagliari, but the superiors there hesitated because of his delicate health. He then called upon an influential friend who interceded for him, and he was allowed to be received into the novitiate on 10 November 1721. Ignatius made his profession on 10 November 1722. Despite his infirmities, his ardor allowed him to attend the spiritual exercises of the order and to excel in perfection of his observance of the order's Rule. From 1722 until 1737, he worked at the house's weaving shed and from 1737 onwards was an alms beggar.

Ignatius spent his time in a number of different occupations and was later appointed as the quester of alms due to his humble and modest conduct. He had good relations with the people in Cagliari, who realized that although he was begging alms, he was also giving back to them in a spiritual manner. His modest demeanor was seen as a quiet sermon for all who saw him going about, which made him a noted figure. He seldom spoke; when required, he spoke with exceptional kindness and great affection. He would also instruct the children and the uneducated that he came across, and went out to comfort the sick and urge sinners to be converted and to perform penance.

He was known for his strict and total obedience to his superiors, even when it required the denial of his own will. He would not go to the house of a certain usurer because he feared that in accepting alms from the man, he would share the guilt of his injustices. But when the man complained, his superior ordered him to accept alms from him. However, when he returned to the friary and opened the sack with the alms the usurer had offered, blood started flowing out. To those present, Ignatius replied: "This is the blood of the poor; squeezed from them by usury". Ignatius' sister had often written to him asking him to visit her so that she could get his advice on certain matters. Ignatius had no mind to heed her request, but when his superior ordered him to, he at once undertook the visit. But he left again as soon as he had given the required advice. Ignatius' brother was sent to prison, and it was hoped that, in view of his reputation, Ignatius might obtain his release. His superior sent him to speak to the governor, but he simply asked that his brother be dealt with according to justice.

Despite poor health and infirmities, he continued his work, however arduous. Even after he became blind in 1779, he continued to work for the benefit of those around him. Ignatius died on 11 May 1781 at 3:00 pm in Cagliari, where his remains were interred.

== Veneration ==
The cause for beatification opened after he died in 1844 (diocesan level) and there were numerous reports of miracles attributed to him occurring at his tomb. The cause commenced and investigated the life and works of the friar, the positio, was sent to the Congregation for the Causes of Saints in 1868) while the confirmation of his heroic virtue enabled Pope Pius IX - on 26 May 1869 - to title Ignatius as Venerable. The confirmation of two miracles attributed to him (occurring after death) enabled Pope Pius XII to preside over his beatification on 16 June 1940. The ratification of an additional two miracles (occurring after beatification) allowed for Pius XII to canonize the friar on 21 October 1951 in Saint Peter's Basilica. The positio compiled during the cause noted that there were 121 miracles attributed to Ignatius during his life, with an additional 86 reported after his death.

Ignatius is known as a patron saint of beggars and students. On 11 May 2007, he was proclaimed as the patron saint of the Province of Oristano. On 11 May 2014, a statue dedicated to him was unveiled in Sestu.
