= José María Bustamante =

Mexican composer

José María Bustamante (March 19, 1777, Toluca – December 4, 1861, Mexico City) was a Mexican composer.

Bustamante worked at various churches in Mexico City as a chapel master, his last posting being at the Metropolitan Cathedral. Active in the Mexican independence movement, he taught at the first conservatory in Latin America, which was founded in Mexico in 1824. He was best known for his heroic melodrama Méjico libre (Free Mexico), besides which he also wrote an opera and church music.
