= Johan Agrell =

German/Swedish baroque composer

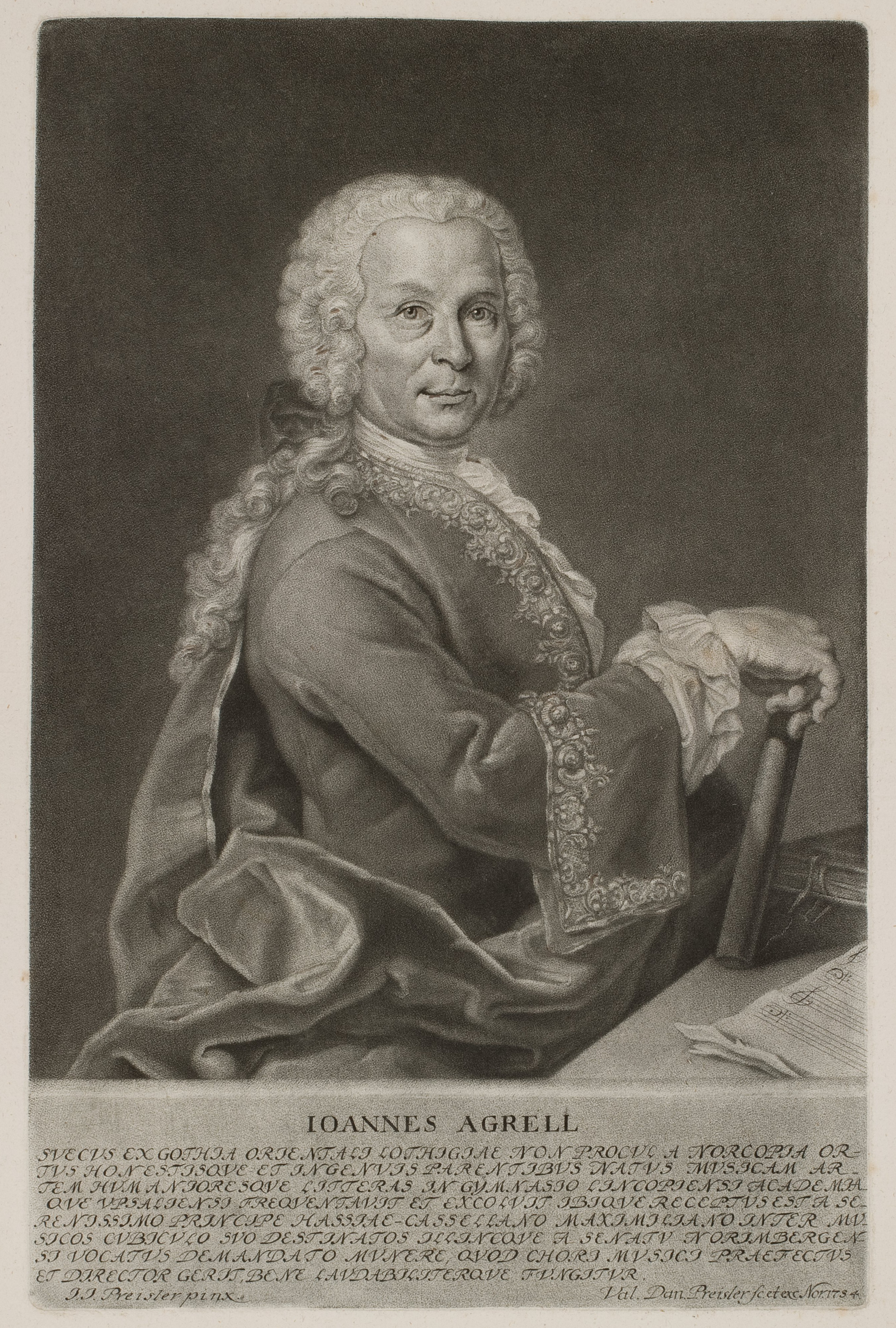
Johan Joachim Agrell by Valentin Daniel Preisler (1754)

Johan Joachim Agrell (1 February 1701 – 19 January 1765) was a German/Swedish baroque composer.

He was born in Löth parish, Memming district, Östergötland, a province in Sweden, and studied in Uppsala. By 1734 he was a violinist at the Kassel court, travelling in England, France, Italy, and elsewhere. From 1746 onward, he was Kapellmeister in Nuremberg. He wrote occasional vocal works and numerous symphonies, harpsichord concertos and sonatas, many of which were published. He was a fluent composer in the north German galant style of the time, and also an appreciated musician and conductor. According to Per Lindfors, Agrell composed at least 22 symphonies. He died at Nuremberg.

Agrell also used the following variants of his name: Johan Agrelius, Giovanni Agrell, Giovanni Aggrell, Johann Agrell, Johann Joachim Agrell.

== Bibliography ==
- Lindfors, Per (1948). "Agrell, Johan". In Carlquist, Gunnar; Carlsson, Josef (eds.). Svensk uppslagsbok (in Swedish). Vol. 1 (2nd ed.). Malmö: Förlagshuset Norden AB. OCLC 3448783.
