= Charles Othon Frédéric Jean-Baptiste de Clarac =

French artist, scholar and archaeologist

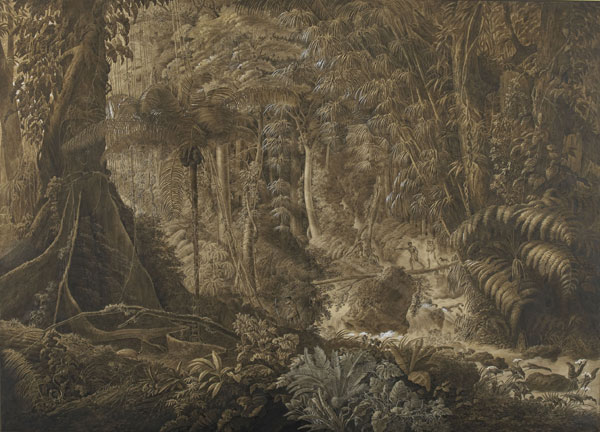
Forêt vierge du Brésil, by Charles Othon Frédéric Jean-Baptiste de Clarac, 1819 (Louvre).

Charles Othon Frédéric Jean-Baptiste, Comte de Clarac (24 June 1777, Paris – 20 January 1847, Paris) was a French artist, scholar and archaeologist. He published a catalogue of the Musée du Louvre, and a Manuel de l'Histoire de l'art and also that which is considered his best work: the Musée de sculpture antique et moderne, 1826–1852, completed after his death.

Having served for some time in the army of prince Conde, and afterward entered a Russian regiment. After that he returned to France, and then to Naples in 1808. During his stay there he superintended the excavations at Pompeii, the results of which he described in his book, Fouilles Faites a Pompei. He soon left Italy and followed the duke of Luxembourg in his embassy to Brazil. On his return to Paris he was appointed successor to Visconti as keeper of the Musee des Antiques.

== Life ==
Emigrating on the Revolution, he travelled round Europe, finding success in drawing and archaeology. He became tutor to the children of Joachim Murat, king of Naples, and was charged by Murat with showing them round the ruins of Pompeii. He returned to France under the Consulate, and was made conservator of antiquities at the Louvre in 1818. In 1838 he was admitted to the Académie des Beaux-Arts as a free member.

Highly talented at drawing, he accompanied the diplomatic mission of the Duke of Luxemburg, extraordinary ambassador to king Louis XVIII, to Brazil. On the shores of the Paraîbo do Sul, in the woods of Rio Bonito to the north of Rio de Janeiro, he made several signed croquis, and once he was back in Europe worked them up into a large watercolour of the untouched and primitive forest interior of Brazil. The resulting work (also the result of minute study of tropical plants cultivated in the greenhouses of prince Maximilien zu Wied's château), Forêt vierge du Brésil, was shown at the Salon of 1819. From its vegetal profusion emanates an organic luxuriance which several photographers later tried to emulate and reproduce.

The famous naturalist Alexander von Humboldt, who had in his "Essay on the Geography of Plants" demanded that artists go to the New World and paint the richness of its vegetation, bought the work due to "its organic sense of the detail emanating from the totality of nature". It was acquired by the Louvre's "département des Arts graphiques" in 2004, and in 2005 a special exhibition was centred on it.

== Works ==
Besides a Catalogue du musée du Louvre and a Manuel de l'histoire de l'art, 1847, 3 volumes in-12, he wrote Musée de sculpture antique et moderne, 1826–1855, 6 volumes in-8, with plates in-4, a substantial publication which used up his fortune and which he was unable to finish before his death.

== Sources ==
- "Charles Othon Frédéric Jean-Baptiste de Clarac", in Marie-Nicolas Bouillet and Alexis Chassang (dir.), Dictionnaire universel d'histoire et de géographie, 1878
- Forêt vierge du Brésil - Louvre catalogue
