= Georg Ludwig von Bar =

Georg Ludwig von Bar (6 January 1701 - 6 August 1767) was a German "secular" canon ("Domherr"), writer and translator.

== Life ==
Georg Ludwig von Bar was born in Hanover where Heinrich Sigismund von Bar (1654–1721), his father, was a senior public official ("Geheimrat" / privy counsellor) with responsibility for administering the estates of the semi-divorced Princess Sophie Dorothee of Braunschweig-Celle. Von Bar's mother, born Anna Agnes von Chalon, also came from, an aristocratic family.

He studied Law successively in Utrecht, Heidelberg and Lunéville, before returning to the region of his birth and being appointed canon ("Domherr") at Minden. However, he came into conflict with the Prussian government concerning the rights of the cathedral chapter, and because of this he was obliged to relocate, living between 1729 and 1744 in Osnabrück. Here Archbishop-elector Clemens appointed him to the electoral governing council as a patrimonial seneschal of the (sub-)Prince-Bishopric of Osnabrück where, for historical reasons, and unusually for the Holy Roman Empire, the constitutional structures were configured to acknowledge the existence of both Protestants and Catholics.

In 1744 von Bar removed himself to Hamburg, after which he devoted himself entirely to his writing, inspired by epistolatory and other friendships with contemporary literary figures such as Barthold Heinrich Brockes, Friedrich von Hagedorn and Friedrich Gottlieb Klopstock. By this time von Bar's reputation already extended well beyond just one region, primarily on account of his "Epîtres diverses sur des sujets diverses", a volume of francophone letters "on diverse matters" which he had published in 1740, and which Christian Gottlieb Lieberkühn subsequently, in 1756, translated into German. On the strength of this volume he has been described in several sources as "the best French poet of the Germans". A particularly influential contemporary critic was the author-philosopher Johann Christoph Gottsched who opined that with this book von Bar had "surpassed the French and their satires".

Georg Ludwig von Bar died on 6 August 1767 at the family estate of Schloss Barenaue in Osnabrück.

== Publisher output (not a complete list) ==
- L'Anti-Hegesias. Dialogue en vers sur le suicide. 1762.
- Babiols littéraires et critiques en prose et en vers. Bohn, Hamburg 1760/63 (4 vols.).
- Consolations dans l'infortune. 1758.
- Poetische Werke. Voß, Berlin 1756 (darin die "Epîtres diverses sur des sujets diverses").
