= Otto Magnus von Schwerin =

Army General

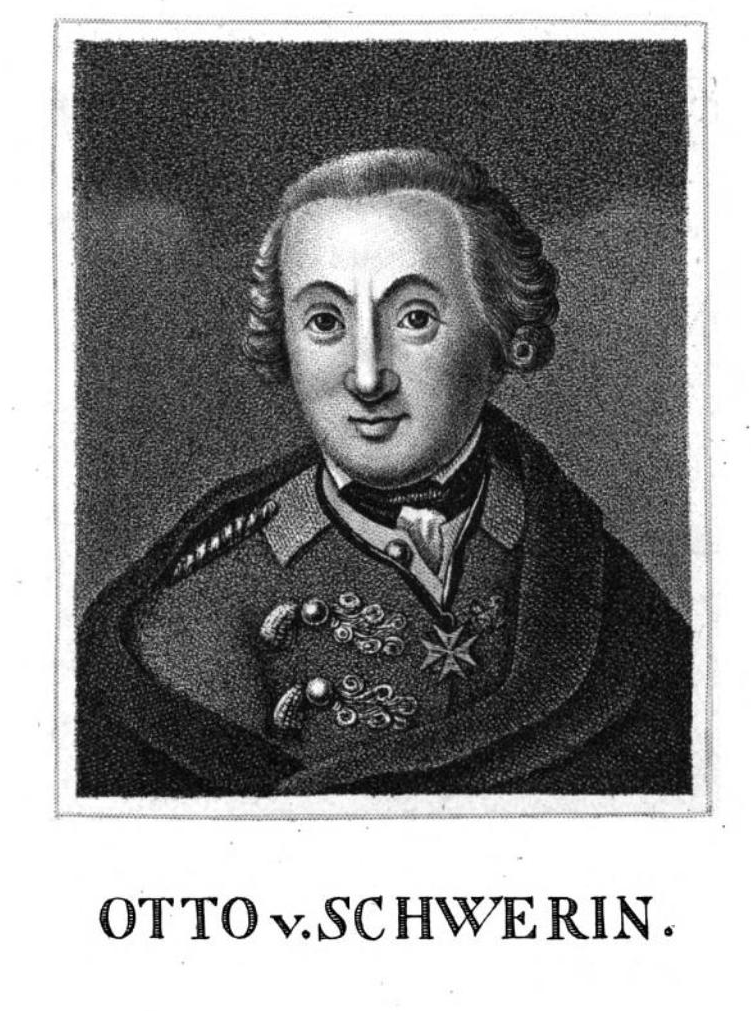
- Born: 21 June 1701 Halberstadt, Germany
- Died: 14 August 1777 (aged 76) Busow, Germany

Otto Magnus (Martin) von Schwerin (21 June 1701 – 14 August 1777) was a Prussian general in the army of Frederick the Great.

His parents were the Prussian colonel Johann Georg (Hans Jürgen) von Schwerin (3 May 1668 - 5 June 1712) and Maria Esther von Dockum. His mother was the daughter of Martin Arnd von Dockum from the Duchy of Geldern and Magdalena Esther von Loë of Oldenpiel. His brother Frederick Leopold (1699–1750) was also a Prussian general.

== Military career ==
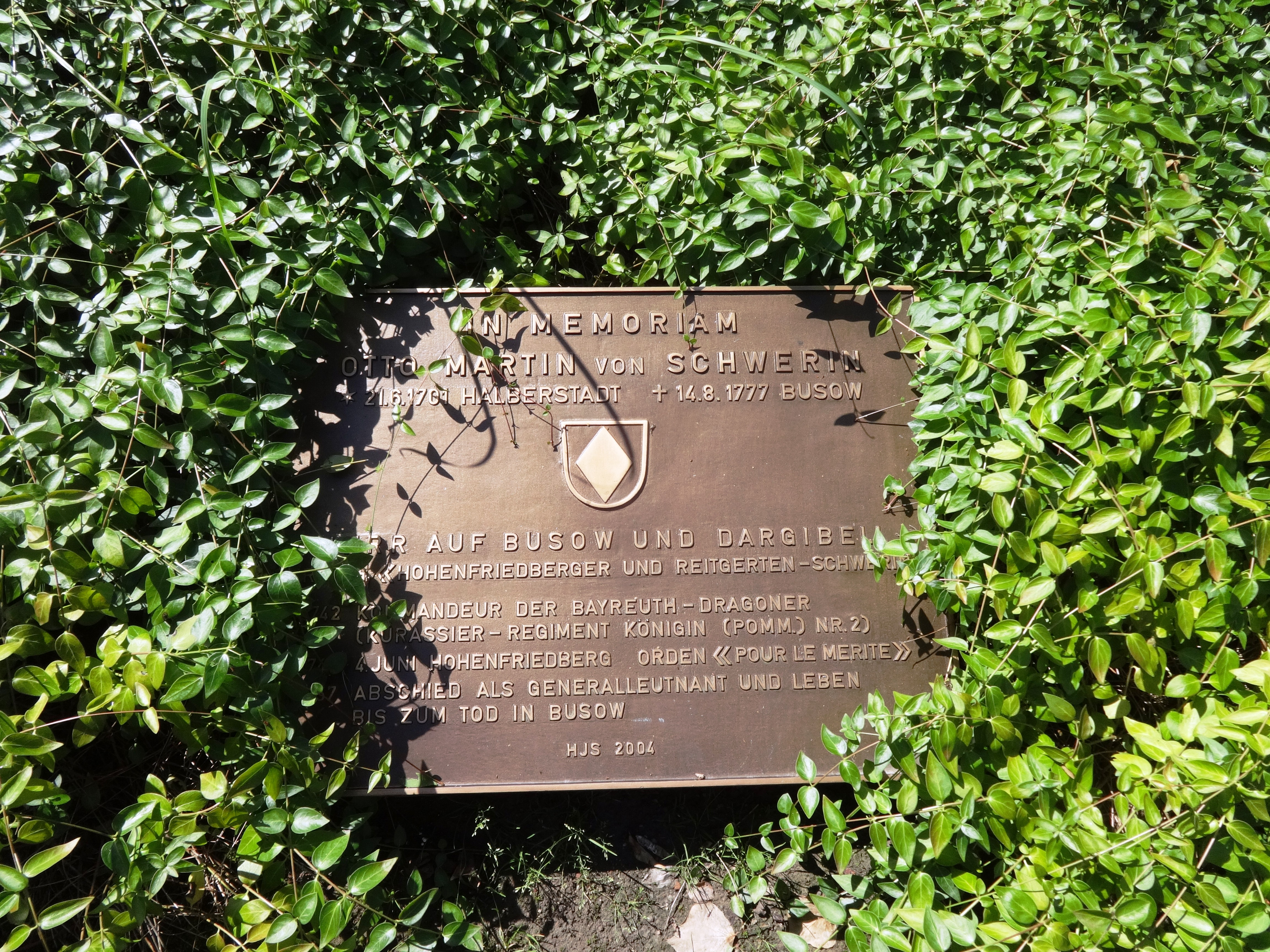
Schwerin's grave

As a 13-year-old boy (1714), he entered the Prussian military service on the Kürassierregiment zu Pferd „Kronprinz“ (Cuirassier-of-Horse Regiment "Crown Prince"). At the beginning of the First Silesian War Schwerin was already Lieutenant-Colonel and Commander of the Markgräflich Bayreutschen Dragoonsregiment ("Margraviate of Bayreuth's Dragoon Regiment"). Both his regiment and himself, however, did not gain any laurels in the battles at Mollwitz in 1741 and Chotusitz in 1742: the latter was particularly painful, when his regiment was dispersed by the enemy cavalry before the advance. In addition, he was seriously wounded and captured by the Austrians. Frederick the Great then decreed the royal disgrace of his cavalry.

Returning to his garrison town of Pasewalk after the peace, Schwerin devoted himself with zeal to the intense training of his regiment. Frederick II was very satisfied with his work and ordered the commanders of the three East Prussian Dragoon regiments to go to Pasewalk and learn from Schwerin.

Schwerin's fame came on 4 June 1745, in the Battle of Hohenfriedberg, by the famous charge of his regiment Bayreuth under Gessler and his leadership. After the battle Frederick the Great said to him, "Schwerin, such a deed as this day is not to be found in all the Roman history," and rewarded Schwerin with the promotion to major general and the award of the Order Pour le Mérite. Later, Schwerin also got the territorial administrative governorship (Amthauptmann) of the Prussian towns of Stettin and Fischhausen, which earned 10,000 thaler annual income.

King Friedrich was less satisfied with Schwerin's achievements in peacetime, because the general was soon known for having fun carousing with his officers. Frederick exhorted him "to stop from drinking," but without success. In 1755, during the autumn maneuver at Stargard, Schwerin received such a sharp reprimand from the king, "A mischief that pulls him once more." He then withdrew to his estates in Pomerania and asked for leave, which however was not granted. After a year, the Seven Years' War broke out and Frederick urged Schwerin to resume the command of his regiment, which the General did. In 1756, Schwerin was promoted to lieutenant-general, and distinguished himself again in the battle of Lobositz (1 October 1756), but he took leave in 1757. On account of his conflict with Frederick II, he was never raised to the rank of baron or count, and von Schwerin remained a simple lord.

In 1761, Otto von Schwerin, who lived in Busow, bought the Dargibell estate from Leonhard von Eickstedt. The hard-drinking rider general built a pavilion with a wine cellar, the so-called "drinking house", on a trench-guarded tower hill. There he celebrated hunting and drinking bouts with his former officers from Pasewalk.

Otto Magnus von Schwerin died on his Busow estate near Anklam on 14 August 1777.
