= Johann Georg Dathan =

German painter

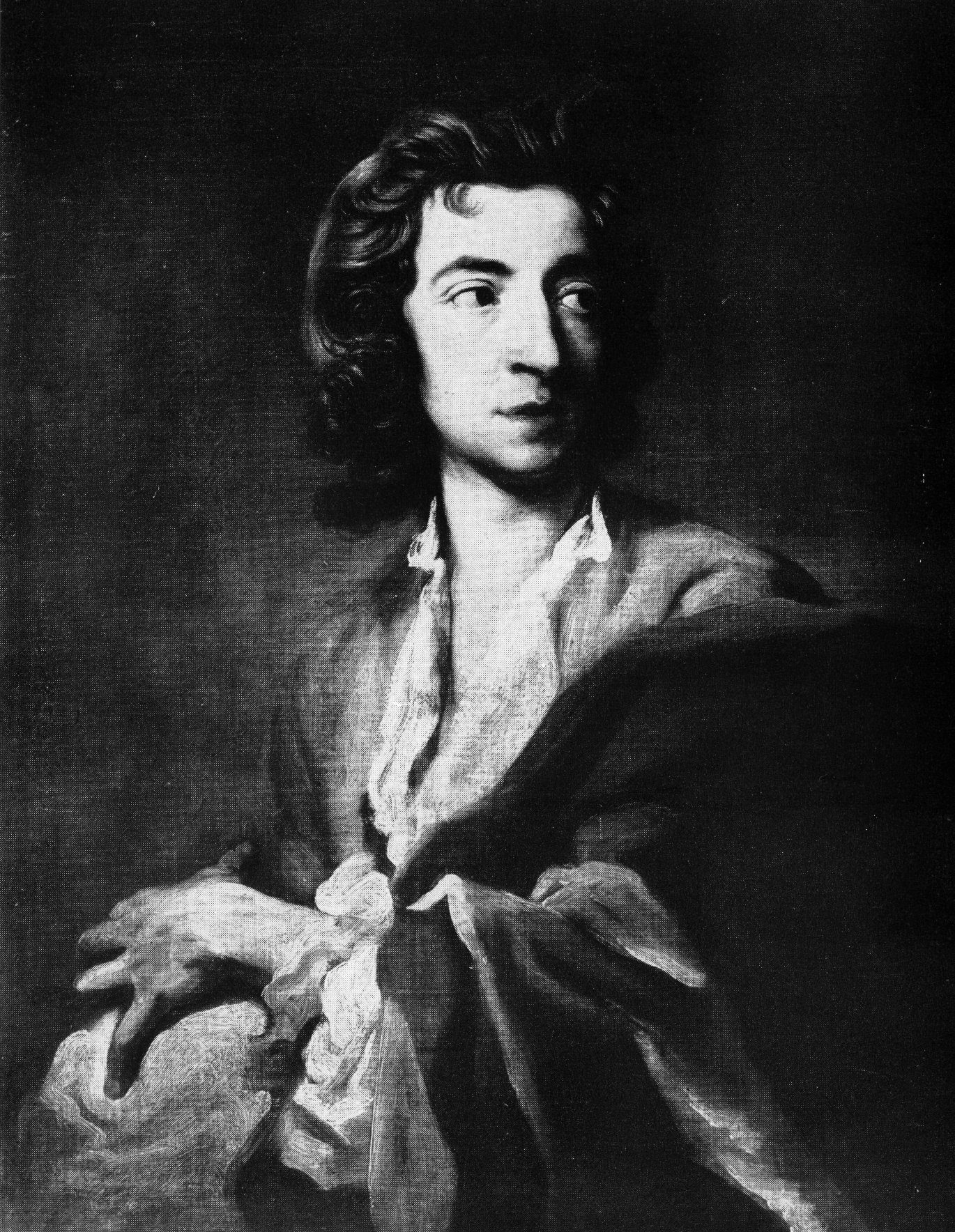
Black-and-white reproduction of a portrait of Paul Egell

Johann Georg Dathan (6 September 1701, in Speyer – 23 March 1749, in Speyer) was a German painter of portraits and historical subjects. He was active in Amsterdam between 1730 and 1736 and Mannheim between 1737 and 1740 before returning to his hometown. One of his best works, an 'Allegory upon the marriage of the Dauphin, son of Louis XV., with the Princess Marie Josephine of Poland,' is in the Dresden Gallery.
