= Charles Frederick Albert, Margrave of Brandenburg-Schwedt =

Prussian prince and military officer (1705–1762)

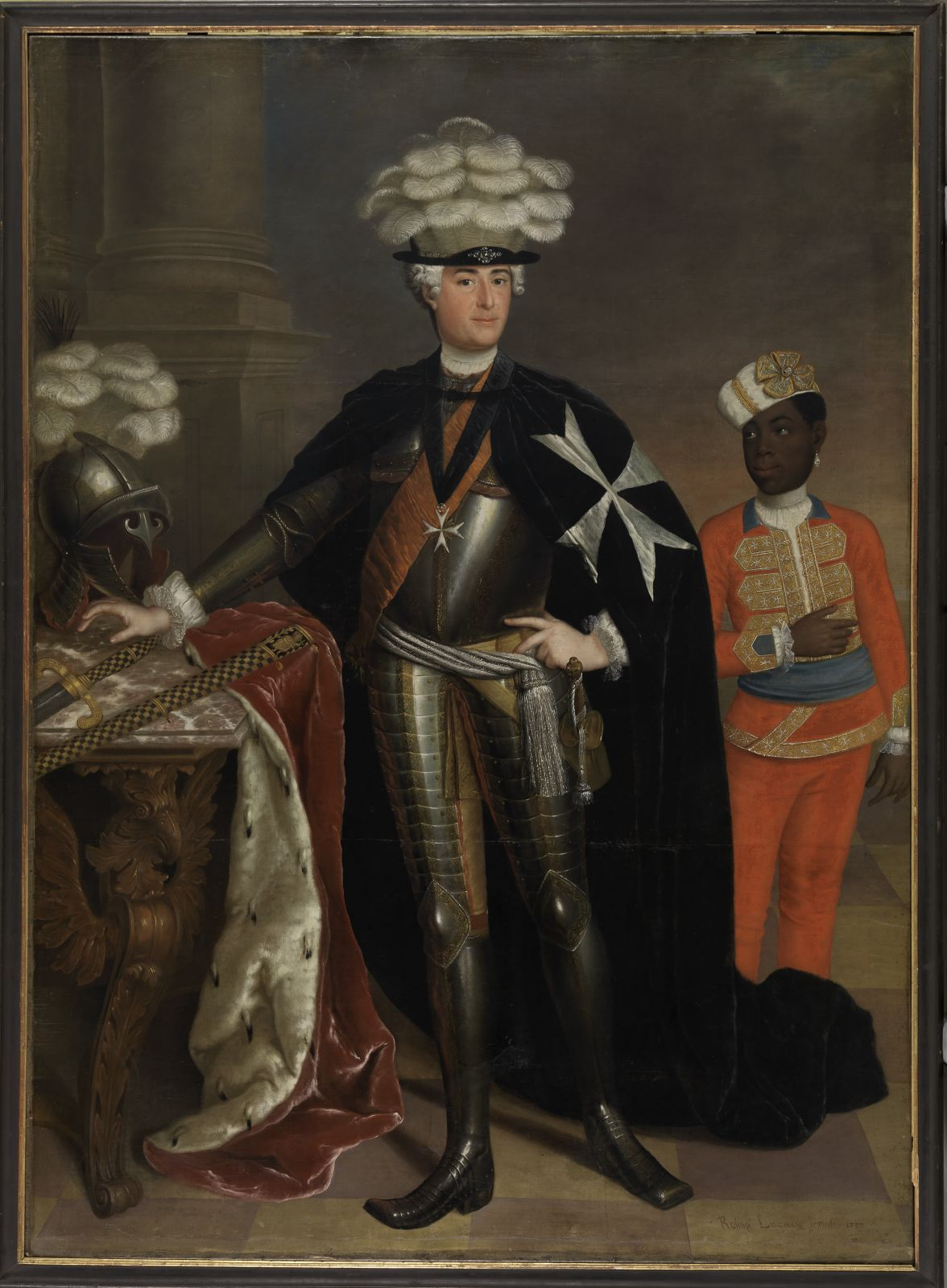
- Margrave Charles of Brandenburg-Schwedt, in his robes as Grand Master of the Order of Saint John, 1737
- Born: 10 June 1705; Berlin
- Died: 22 June 1762 (aged 57); Breslau
- House: Hohenzollern
- Father: Margrave Albert Frederick of Brandenburg-Schwedt
- Mother: Maria Dorothea of Courland

Karl Friedrich Albrecht, Margrave of Brandenburg-Schwedt (10 June 1705 – 22 June 1762), a grandson of Frederick William of Brandenburg (the Great Elector) and son of Margrave Albert Frederick of Brandenburg-Schwedt, was a Prussian military officer and the Herrenmeister (grand master) of the Order of Saint John (Bailiwick of Brandenburg).

== Life ==
Charles of Brandenburg-Schwedt was born in Berlin. He joined the Prussian Army at an early age and distinguished himself during the First Silesian War at the capture of Głogów, at the Battle of Mollwitz and the Battle of Chotusitz. He took command in Upper Silesia in the spring of 1745, to the special satisfaction of his cousin, King Frederick II of Prussia.

During the Seven Years' War Margrave Charles again held independent commands, as Frederick II had confidence in him, and he distinguished himself at the Battle of Hochkirch and the Battle of Torgau. In both battles, as at Mollwitz, he was wounded.

The General German Biography (ADB) describes him as a noble, philanthropic character and lover of the arts and sciences.

For 31 years he governed the knights, the Bailiwick of Brandenburg, and its fiefs as Grand Master of the Order of St. John, having been installed at Sonnenburg in 1731. He died in Breslau.

== Issue ==
Charles Frederick Albert was never married, but had one daughter with his mistress, Dorothea Regina Wuthner (who was raised to the nobility on 14 January 1744 as "Frau von Carlowitz"):

- Caroline Regina von Carlowitz (Soldin, 12 December 1731 – Berlin, 16 September 1755), married in Berlin on 16 June 1747 to Count Albrecht Christian von Schönburg-Hinterglauchau (22 January 1720 – 9 March 1799), Charles's adjutant. They had three children:
  - Countess Ernestine Caroline Wilhelmine Albertine of Schönburg-Hinterglauchau (6 June 1748 – 21 March 1810); married in Berlin on 2 November 1770 to Count Frederick Louis Finck von Finckenstein (18 February 1745 – 18 April 1818).
  - Count Frederick William Charles Ernest of Schönburg-Hinterglauchau (9 January 1751 – 17 June 1751) died young.
  - Count Christian William Charles Frederick Ernest of Schönburg-Hinterglauchau (14 June 1752 – 9 March 1770) died umarried.

In 1744, Charles was engaged to marry Maria Amalia of Hesse-Cassel, but she died before they could wed. Upon his death in 1762, lacking legitimate heirs, his estate reverted to the crown. After the Treaty of Hubertusburg, Frederick II granted these fortunes to the two officers for whom he had particular gratitude: Hans Sigismund von Lestwitz received the estate of Friedland, and Joachim Bernhard von Prittwitz, who had led the king from the battlefield in the Kunersdorf, received the estate at Quillitz. Theodore Fontane gave this circumstance a special mention, by quoting a proverb: "Lestwitz a sauvé l'etat, Prittwitz a sauvé le roi." (Lestwitz saved the state, Prittwitz the king.) The staff officers of the Lestwitz regiment received a golden medal.

== Notes ==
Charles Frederick Albert, Margrave of Brandenburg-Schwedt House of Hohenzollern Born: 10 June 1705
| Preceded by Margrave Albert Frederick of Brandenburg-Schwedt | Herrenmeister (Grand Master) of the Order of Saint John; 1731–1762 | Succeeded by Prince Augustus Ferdinand of Prussia |
