= Von Klitzing =

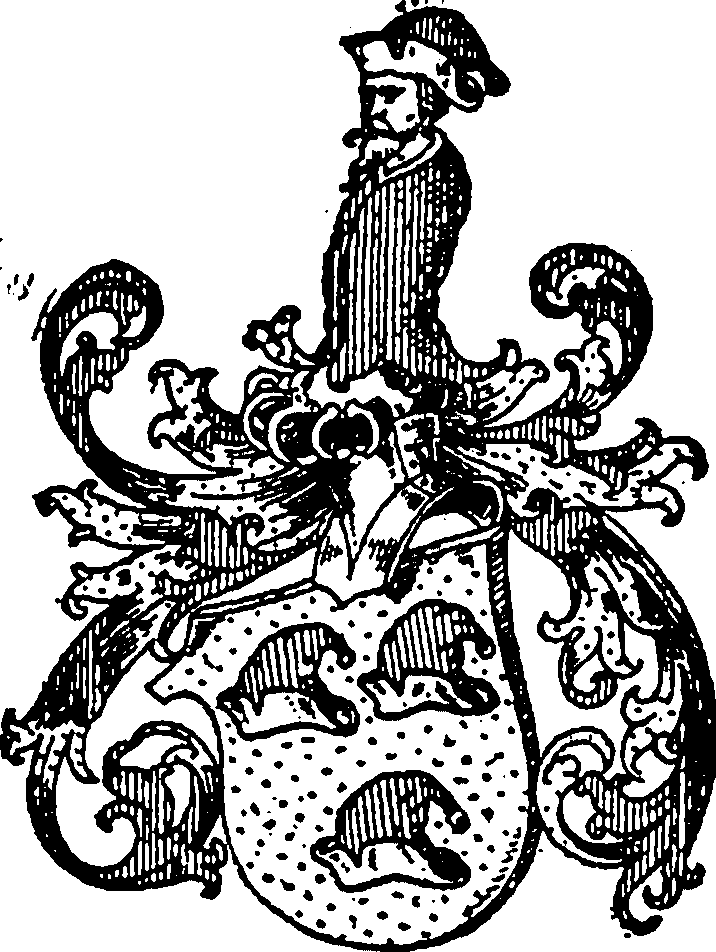
Coat of Arms of the Klitzing family

The Klitzing family or von Klitzing is an old German noble family known since the 13th century, originating in Brandenburg, whose members distinguished themselves as military commanders.

== Notable people ==
- George Ernst von Klitzing (1698–1759), Prussian major general
- Klaus von Klitzing (born 1943), German physicist
