= Karl Wilhelm von Dieskau =

Prussian lieutenant general (1701–1777)

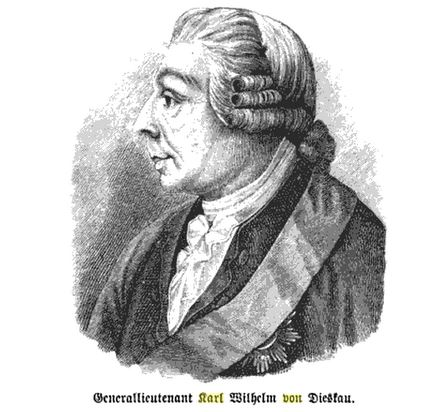
- Lt. General Karl Wilhelm von Dieskau
- Born: 9 August 1701; Kontoppe, Duchy of Glogau, Prussian Neumark
- Died: 14 August 1777 (aged 76); Berlin
- Relatives: Helmuth Karl Bernhard von Moltke (grand nephew)
- Military career
- Allegiance: (Kingdom of Prussia) Prussia
- Branch: Army Artillery
- Service years: 1721–1777
- Rank: Lieutenant General
- Conflicts: First Silesian War; Second Silesian War; Seven Years' War
- Awards: Pour le Mérite; Equestrian statue of Frederick the Great; Order of the Black Eagle

Karl Wilhelm von Dieskau (9 August 1701 – 14 August 1777) was a Prussian lieutenant general and general inspector of the artillery. He participated in twelve campaigns, ten battles, nine sieges. He received the Black Eagle Order, the Order Pour le Mérite, and was included in 1851 on the Equestrian statue of Frederick the Great. He is general credited with creating Frederick the Great's vaunted horse artillery.

== Family ==
His parents were Karl Vollradt von Dieskau (1677–1762), lord of Benndorf, and his second wife, Johanna Eleonore von Körbener, daughter of Heinrich Wilhelm von Körbener. Dieskau himself never married, but his grand-nephew was Field Marshal Helmuth Karl Bernhard von Moltke.

== Military career ==
Dieskau joined the Prussian military on 2 February 1721, and became a bombardier. On 12 April 1727, he was raised to second lieutenant; in 1730 to first lieutenant; on 13 December 1737, he was appointed staff captain, on 19 November 1741, company captain; and on 15 October 1746 promoted to major.

=== Dieskau and artillery ===
When Frederick became king in 1741, his army was behind the times in artillery. Not only were there not enough guns, but their quality was poor. While other armies had learned to bore through a solid core, the Prussians still cast over a core. This made their guns unreliable and difficult to match gauges between and among guns. Furthermore, in the armies of the 1740s, it was artillery, not muskets, that inflicted the heaviest casualties.

Dieskau had already made several contributions to the development of the artillery. Although the King despised artillery men in general, Frederick recognized the value of the units and had brought in Field Marshal Samuel von Schmettau as the artillery "grand master." By 1741, Frederick had formed a second battalion that included a bombardier and five cannon companies. The bombardiers manned the howitzers and mortars, the most specialized tasks; the cannon companies were distributed throughout the army. In 1742, he created an additional artillery garrison at Breslau. In 1744, two battalions received the title of Field Regiment Artillery, under command of Schmettau, although the aging General Christian Nicolaus von Linger, the artillery master of Frederick Wilhelm I, remained in nominal command.

The expansion of artillery service as well as Frederick's increasing dependence upon it improved Dieskau's opportunities for advancement. On 9 July 1752, he received the Order Pour le Mérite, and also the king gave him a magnificent tobacco pot. On 20 April 1755, Dieskau was appointed lieutenant colonel and on 28 February 1757, finally, colonel and General Inspector of the Artillery and all artillery material. By 1756, Frederick had increased the number artillery to over 662 guns. In this position, he was active during the Seven Years' War, responsible for the preparation and execution of all measures relating to the replacement of armaments, equipment and ammunition. During this war, Frederick is usually credited with the creation of the first horse artillery, not intended as cavalry but simply as units that could move rapidly around the battlefield and to offer support where necessary.

Early in the Seven Years' War, under Dieskau's leadership, the companies were enlarged to 300, and the regiment included three battalions, adding two new companies. One of Dieskau's design compromises, introduced in 1755, was the light 6–pound gun on a four-horse team, and a longer barrelled 3–pound gun. Guns were drawn on four-horse teams. Each pair of guns had three non-commissioned officers, and the battalion had 42 gunners, who were mounted and had been trained by dragoons; the gunners dismounted for battle, one man holding the horses and the remainder firing the weapons.

At the Battle of Leuthen in 1757, Frederick's nascent mobile artillery kept pace with the rapidly-moving infantry and laid devastating barrages upon the Austrian lines. Officially, Frederick's first horse artillery detachment, created through a Cabinet Order in April 1759, included six 6–pound guns, referred to as "light" guns. The types of guns might include 6–pound guns, a 7–pound howitzer, and 3–pound guns. The horse artillery was lost at Kunersdorf, replaced quickly, and then lost again at Maxen.

Between 1754 and 1771, nine prototypes had been introduced into the Prussian artillery, based on Dieskau's designs. Although the mobile artillery was disbanded after the Seven Years War, by 1768, while Dieskau was still General Inspector of the Artillery, they had been reformed with greater power and mobility. Frederick promoted Dieskau to major general on 18 October 1762; on 16 May 1768, he received his promotion to lieutenant general was made a Knight of the Black Eagle Order.

Karl Wilhelm von Dieskau died unmarried on 14 August 1777 in Berlin. A solemn funeral was held in Berlin by order of Frederick II. In 1851, his name was included with other founders of the Prussian state on the Equestrian statue of Frederick the Great by Frederick's great-great nephew, Frederick William IV.
