= Joachim Bernhard von Prittwitz =

Prussian general

Joachim Bernhardt von Prittwitz and Gaffron
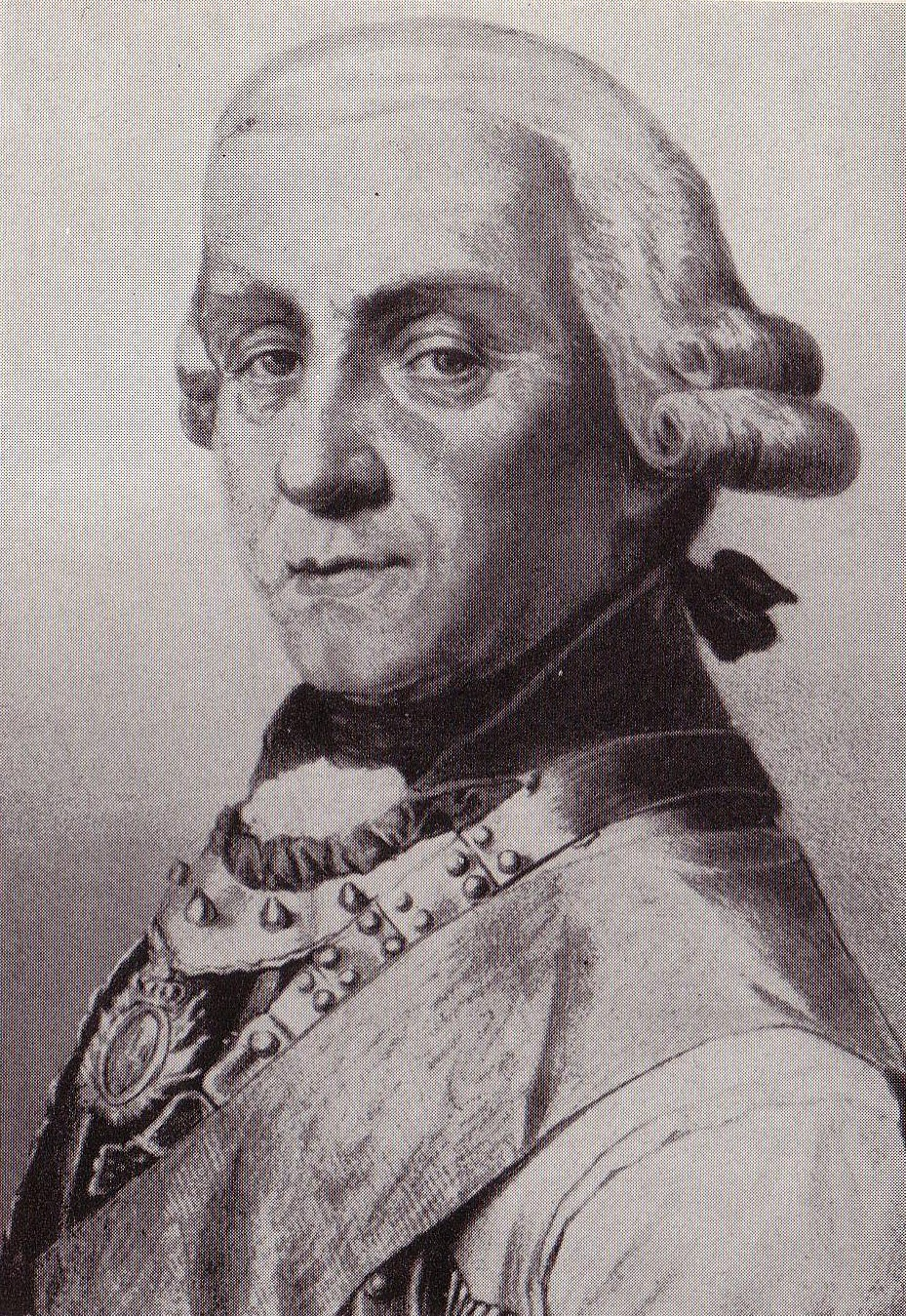
- Joachim Bernhardt von Prittwitz
- Born: 3 February 1726; Groß Läswitz, Lower Silesia
- Died: 4 July 1793 (aged 67); Berlin
- Military career
- Allegiance: (Kingdom of Prussia) Prussia
- Branch: Army Artillery
- Service years: 1741–1793
- Rank: Lieutenant General
- Conflicts: Second Silesian War; Seven Years' War
- Awards: Pour le Mérite at the Battle of Zorndorf; Order of the Black Eagle; Equestrian statue of Frederick the Great

Joachim Bernhardt von Prittwitz and Gaffron (1726–1793) was a Prussian officer credited with saving the life of Frederick the Great at the Battle of Kunersdorf. At the time, he was a cavalry captain in Hans Joachim von Zieten's Hussar regiment. He became the head of gendarmes regiment, and inspector general of the cavalry of Brandenburg March and Magdeburg in 1775. He was promoted to lieutenant general in 1785 and general of cavalry in 1788. Frederick awarded him the Order Pour le Mérite and the Order of the Black Eagle. In 1851, Prittwitz was included on the panels of the Equestrian statue of Frederick the Great as one of the key figures in the establishment of the Prussia state.

== Family ==
Prittwitz was born in Groß Läswitz. He came from the old and established Silesian nobility of Prittwitz, and was the son of the Prussian military captain and landowner Joachim Wilhelm von Prittwitz (13 March 1693–5 June 1758), master of Groß Läswitz, and Sophie Wilhelmine Gottesliebe von Domnig (9 February 1698–28 October 1752). He was born on 3 February 1726, on his father's estate.

As a 36-year-old on 16 December 1762 in Berlin, he married the widowed Eleanor of Paczensky and Tenczin, born Freiin von Seherr-Thoß (12 January 1739 on the estate at Schönfeld, Kr. Schweidnitz, Lower Silesia, died 23 February 1799 in Berlin), the daughter of the Junker Karl Heinrich von Seherr-Thoss, lord on the estates Schönfeld and Ludwigsdorf, and the Anna Elisabeth von Zedlitz and Leipe. Eleonore, a wealthy heiress, brought to the marriage fourteen properties in Lower Silesia near Breslau and Hirschberg.

== Military career ==
Prittwitz first attended a village school, later to the Oelser Gymnasium. In August 1741, he entered the Prussian cadet corps in Berlin, and in November of that same year was accepted as a Fahnenjunker (cadet) in Dragoon Regiment Nr. 1 (von Posadowski). From here, Prittwitz's military career modeled that of other Junker sons.

In the War of Austrian Succession, Prittwitz remained with Dragoon Regiment Nr. 4 and participated in all the major battles: in particular, he distinguished himself at the Battle of Hohenfriedberg on 7 June 1745. On 4 April 1746, he was promoted to the Fähnrich and was stationed in garrison in Schwedt. On 8 May 1751, he became a second lieutenant. During the Seven Years' War, he was at the Battle of Kolin on 18 June 1757 and the Battle of Zorndorf on 25 August 1758, after which he was honored with the Order Pour le Mérite. Short of cash, though, in 1758 he asked his king for money in a long poem, and he answered: "Wer dieses so artig in Verse gebracht, dem werden 500 Dukaten vermacht. – Ich bin Euer wohlaffectionirter König Friedrich." (He who has expressed himself so well in this verse will be left with 500 ducats. I am your well-disposed King Frederick."

At the end of 1758, the King instructed General Hans Joachim von Zieten to select the best officers for his Hussars from the whole army, and he selected Prittwitz as first lieutenant. On 12 August 1759, Prittwitz, then thirty-three years old, was promoted to the Rittmeister (cavalry captain). At a critical point in Battle of Kunersdorf, he saw Frederick standing on a small hill with the remnants of his body-guard—the Leib Cuirassier—determined to either hold the line or to die trying. With a 100-strong Hussar squadron, Rittmeister Prittwitz cut his way through the Cossacks and dragged the King to safety.

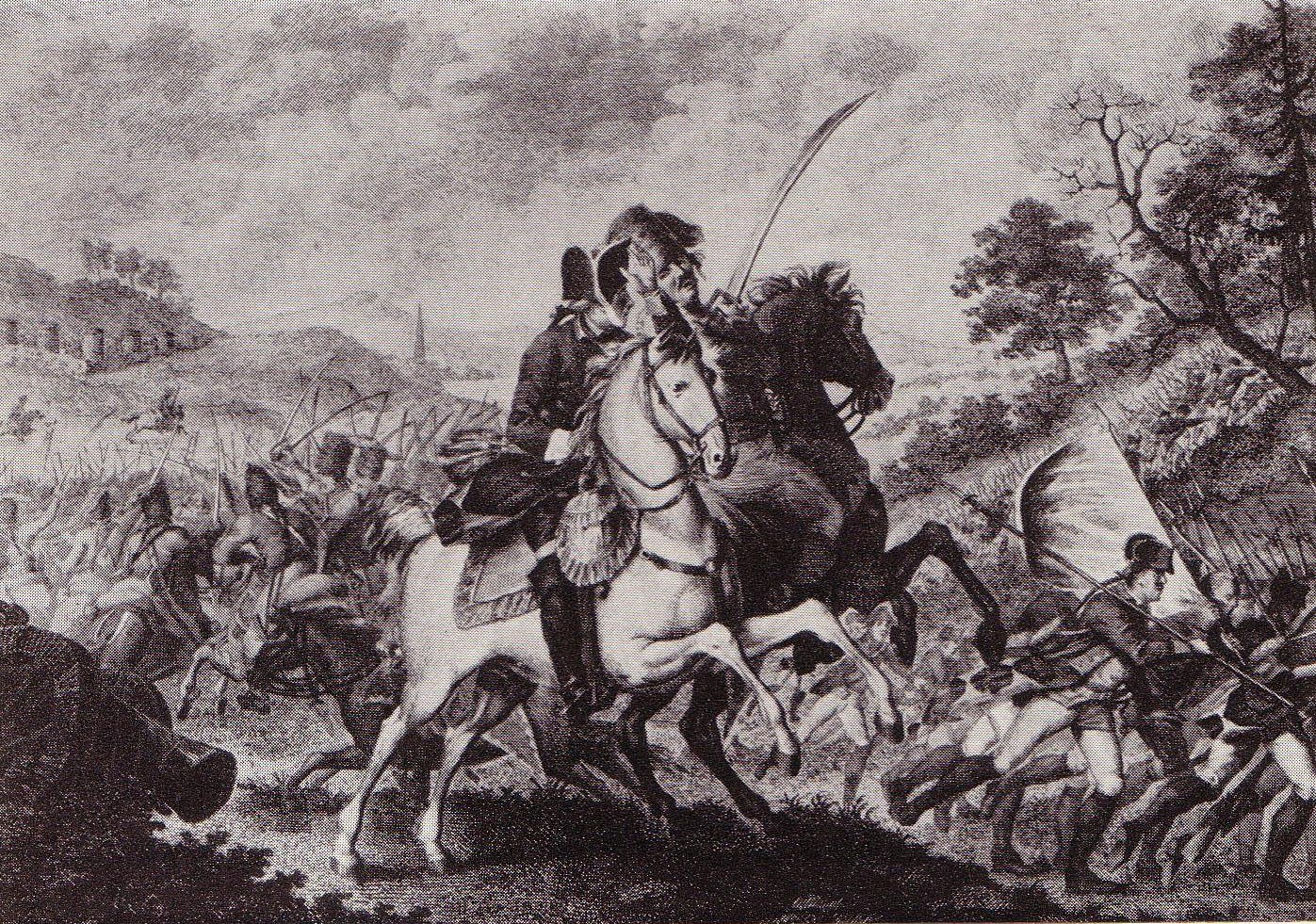
Joachim Bernhard rescues Frederick the Great from capture or death at the Battle of Kunersdorf.

Prittwitz was promoted to major on 10 December 1760 and received the command of the 1st Battalion of his regiment. In 1761, Prittwitz was often working for the king personally. He was promoted to the lieutenant colonel in 1763, after the end of the Seven Years' War, which he had begun as a lieutenant, and soon became commander of the Hussars' regiment. Upon the death of Charles Frederick Albert, Margrave of Brandenburg-Schwedt without heirs in 1762, his estate reverted to the crown. After the Treaty of Hubertusburg, Frederick II granted these fortunes to the two officers toward whom he had particular gratitude: Lieutenant Colonel Hans Sigismund von Lestwitz, who had proven instrumental at the Battle of Torgau, received the estate of Friedland, and Prittwitz, who had led the King from the battlefield at Kunersdorf, received the estate at Quilitz (present-day Kwielice). Theodor Fontane gave this circumstance a special mention, by quoting a proverb: "Lestwitz a sauvé l'etat, Prittwitz a sauvé le roi." (Lestwitz saved the state, Prittwitz saved the king.")

In the years after 1763, Prittwitz carried out special assignments for the King: in 1765, he investigated the suitability of a proposed canal for shipping, and in 1767, he examined irregularities in the casting of Berlin coin. On 12 December 1768 he was appointed colonel. On 20 May 1775, he became major general and commander of the "Regiment Gendarmes" in Berlin and Inspector General of the Cavalry of Brandenburg and Magdeburg.

Promotions

- Fahnrich: August 1741
- Cadet: 4 April 1746
- Second Lieutenant Dragoon Regiment No. 1: 8 May 1751
- First Lieutenant: 1758
- Captain (Rittmeister): 12 August 1759
- Major: 10 December 1760
- Lt Colonel: 1763
- Colonel: 12 December 1768
- Major General: 20 May 1775
- Lieutenant General: 20 May 1785
- Inspector General of Cavalry: 20 May 1789

In 1778, during the War of Bavarian Succession, Prittwitz commanded a brigade on the Prussian right wing, consisting of 13 squadrons. In the years 1779–1783, Prittwitz founded the colony "Prittwitzdorf" at his Rudelstadt estate near Kupferberg, whose inhabitants were predominantly weavers and miners. He was promoted to lieutenant general on 20 May 1785, and on 26 May 1785, he received the Order of the Black Eagle in Magdeburg. Until the King's death, he was often a guest in Sanssouci. A lithograph by Georg Schöbel shows Prittwitz, together with other generals, at the deathbed of Frederick on 17 August 1786, at Sanssouci Palace in Potsdam.

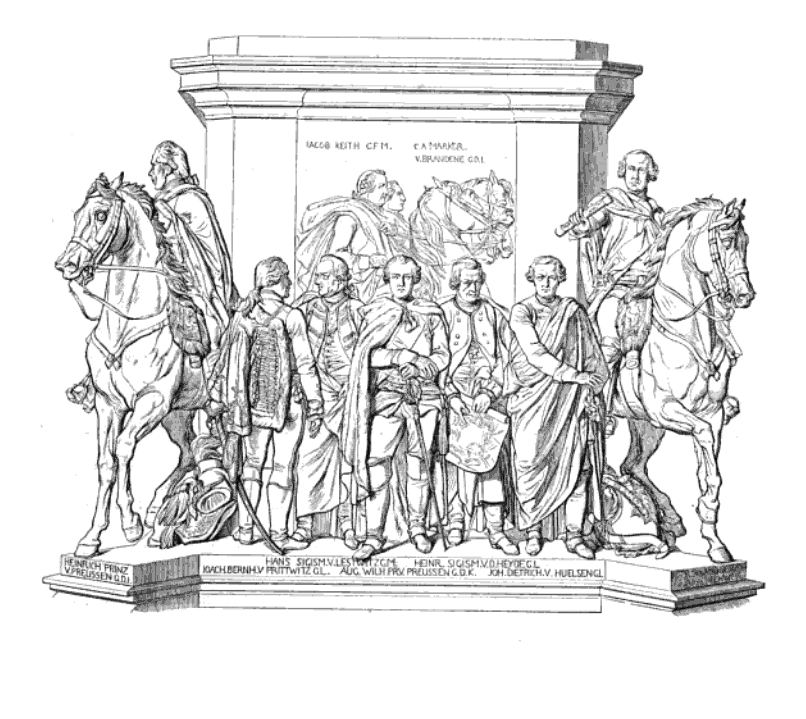
Figure on the Equestrian statue of Frederick the Great: (left to right) Joachim Bernhard von Prittwitz, Hans Sigismund von Lestwitz, Prince Augustus William of Prussia, Heinrich Sigismund von der Heyde, Johann Dietrich von Hülsen.

On 20 May 1789, Prittwitz was appointed general of the cavalry by the new Prussian king Frederick William II. His penchant for gambling caused his dismissal as inspector in 1790. He died on 4 June 1793 in Berlin, and his body was removed to his estate in Quilitz for burial.

Prittwitz was also commemorated with Frederick the Great on the equestrian statue, and on a monument in Rheinsberg.
