= Hans Sigismund von Lestwitz =

Prussian major general

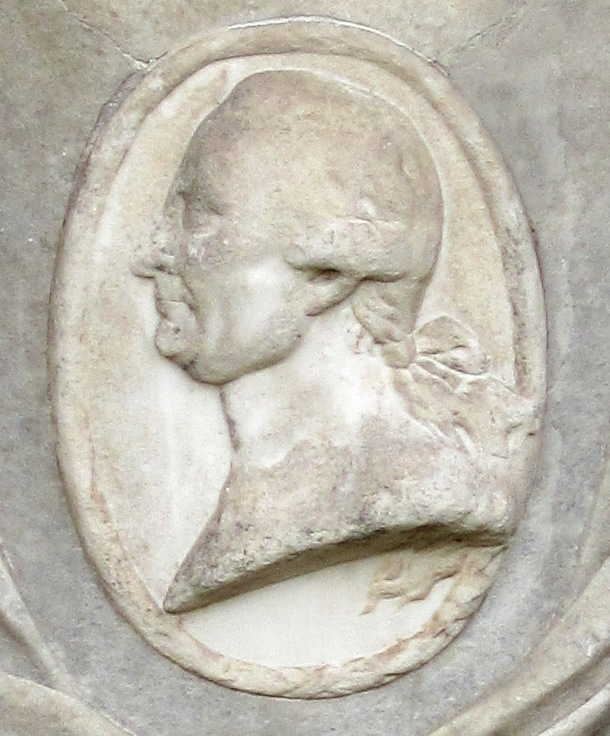
- Relief of Lestwitz from his tomb
- Born: 19 June 1718; Kontoppe, Duchy of Glogau
- Died: 26 January 1786 (aged 86); Berlin
- Relatives: Johann Georg von Lestwitz, Lieutenant General (father); Helene Charlotte von Friedland (daughter)
- Military career
- Allegiance: (Kingdom of Prussia) Prussia
- Branch: Army
- Service years: 1734–1779
- Rank: General
- Commands: Life Grenadier Regiment of the Royal Prussian Guard
- Conflicts: First Silesian War; Second Silesian War Hohenfriedberg Katholisch-Hennersdorf Kesselsdorf; Seven Years' War Prague Battle of Lobositz Torgau; Bavarian War of Succession
- Awards: Pour le Mérite;

Hans Sigismund von Lestwitz (19 June 1718 – 16 February 1788) was a Prussian major general of the infantry and was especially honored by Frederick II for his action in the Battle of Torgau. His decisive leadership at Torgau, in which he snatched victory from defeat, was credited at the time and subsequently with saving the Prussian state. Frederick acknowledged his action with the post-war gift of vast estates near Kunersdorf.

== Family ==
The Lestwitz's were an old Silesian family, dating to the 14th century with Hannes, a free man who served the Duke of Silesia. Hans Sigismund von Lestwitz was born on 19 June 1718 in Kontoppe, Duchy of Glogau, part of the Brandenburg Neumark. His father, Johann Georg von Lestwitz, was a lieutenant general in the Prussian Army and his mother, Helen, was Baroness von Kottwitz. As a youth, Lestwitz studied at the University of Frankfurt. Lestwitz's military career emulated that of the sons of other Junkers. Many of the Junkers owned immense estates, especially in the north-eastern part of Prussia (i.e. the provinces of Brandenburg, Pomerania, Silesia, West Prussia, East Prussia and Posen). Their younger sons frequently followed careers as soldiers, starting as Fahnenjunker and accepting commissions in various branches of the military. With so many family members pursuing profitable careers in the military, the Junkers became heavily invested in the success of the Prussian state.

Lestwitz married Catharina Charlotte von Tresckow (1734–1789), and they had one daughter, Helene Charlotte (1754–1803). Charlotte married at the age of 16, but the marriage was later annulled. Based on his successful career in the army, especially during the latter years of the Seven Years' War, Lestwitz was able to invest in property, eventually acquiring substantial holdings near Friedland, both via purchase and gifts from his grateful king. The property, referred to as Old Friedland, included six farms, several sheep and cow herds and a mill, plus assorted fishing communities. Fishing employed a third of the population until the end of the century. Eventually his daughter inherited the estates. She drained much of the marshland, creating a more profitable environment. Charlotte, known by decree of Frederick William II as the Lady of Friedland, was widely considered to be a successful agriculturalist, albeit a "very strange woman."

== Military career ==
Lestwitz began his military career in 1734 as a Fahnenjunker in the infantry regiment of Kurt Christoph von Schwerin in Frankfurt on the Oder. In the First and Second Silesian Wars, Lestwitz participated in some of the most hotly contested battles: Mollwitz, Chotusitz, Hohenfriedberg, and Soor. In the Seven Years' War, after the Battle of Lobositz (1 October 1756), he received the Order Pour le Mérite.

In 1757, Lestwitz's father, Johann Georg von Lestwitz, failed to defend the Breslau fortress from the Austrian-French force, damaging the family's reputation. The population of Breslau supported the Austrians and made the Prussians’ defense difficult. Breslau's citizens pressured Lestwitz to vacate the fortress and aided any Prussian deserters. Lestwitz senior surrendered on the night of 25 November on condition of being allowed to withdraw unhindered. Out of 4,227 Prussian soldiers, only 599 of them began the march to Glogau; the rest deserted. The loss of Breslau required Frederick to march cross-country from Rossbach where, earlier in November, he had won a decisive engagement against the Imperial and French forces. In 12 days, Frederick's army covered the 272 km (169 mi) to Leuthen, a half day's march from Breslau, where he engaged a superior Imperial force. Following his victory there, Frederick laid siege to Breslau, which surrendered a week later.

Despite his father's failure at Breslau, young Lestwitz maintained Frederick's approval and his actions at the exhausting Battle of Torgau helped to reestablish the family in the eyes of the King. In 1760, now a major, Lestwitz the younger in the infantry regiment "Alt-Braunschweig", helped to snatch victory from defeat. The King had been was injured by grapeshot; the assault on the Austrian line had failed. Prussian troops, scattered throughout the battlefield, seemed incapable of mounting a coherent assault on the Austrian line. Believing all was lost, Frederick had handed command to Lieutenant General Johann Dietrich von Hülsen and started to leave the battlefield. The fighting raged through the night and around dawn, Lestwitz collected scattered troops, organized them into three battalions and led them in a new attack. Lestwitz's action gave decisive support to a concurrent attack of Hans Joachim von Zieten's Hussar Regiment. The additional support changed the tide of battle.

Upon the death of the childless Charles Frederick Albert, Margrave of Brandenburg-Schwedt in 1762, his estate reverted to the crown. After the Treaty of Hubertusburg, Frederick II granted these fortunes to the two officers for whom he had particular personal gratitude: Hans Sigismund von Lestwitz received the estate of Friedland; and Joachim Bernhard von Prittwitz, who had escorted the king to safety from the battlefield at the Kunersdorf, received the estate at Quilitz (present-day Kwielice). Theodor Fontane gave this circumstance a special mention, writing: "Lestwitz a sauvé l'etat, Prittwitz a sauvé le roi." (Lestwitz saved the state, Prittwitz saved the king.") The staff officers of the Lestwitz regiment received a golden medal.

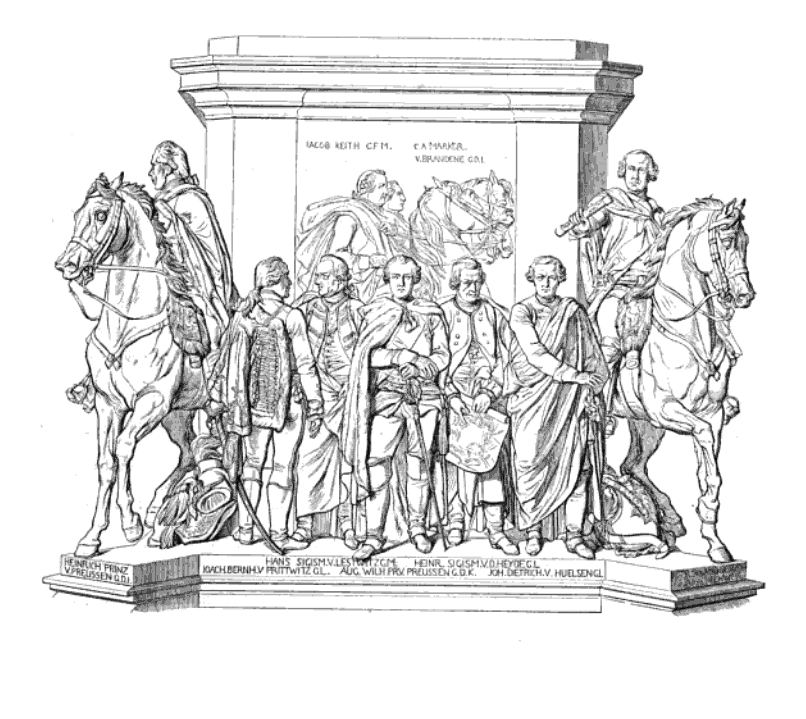
Figure on the Equestrian statue of Frederick the Great: (left to right) Joachim Bernhard von Prittwitz, Hans Sigismund von Lestwitz, Prince Augustus William of Prussia, Heinrich Sigismund von der Heyde, Johann Dietrich von Hülsen.

In 1765, Lestwitz was appointed colonel, and in 1766 he was appointed Inhaber of the Life Grenadier Regiment. At the outbreak of the War of Bavarian Succession, as a major general, he commanded the right wing of the Prussian army. At the conclusion of this unexciting war, he retired in 1779. In 1788, he died in Berlin.
