= Lasowice, Legnica County =

Lasowice
- Village
- Location within Poland
- Coordinates: 51°11′49″N 16°26′18″E
- Country: Poland
- Voivodeship: Lower Silesian
- County: Legnica
- Gmina: Ruja

Lasowice [lasɔˈvit͡sɛ] is a village in the administrative district of Gmina Ruja, within Legnica County, Lower Silesian Voivodeship, in south-western Poland.

== People ==
- Joachim Bernhard von Prittwitz (1726-1793), Prussian officer
