= Konotop, Lubusz Voivodeship =

Konotop
- Village
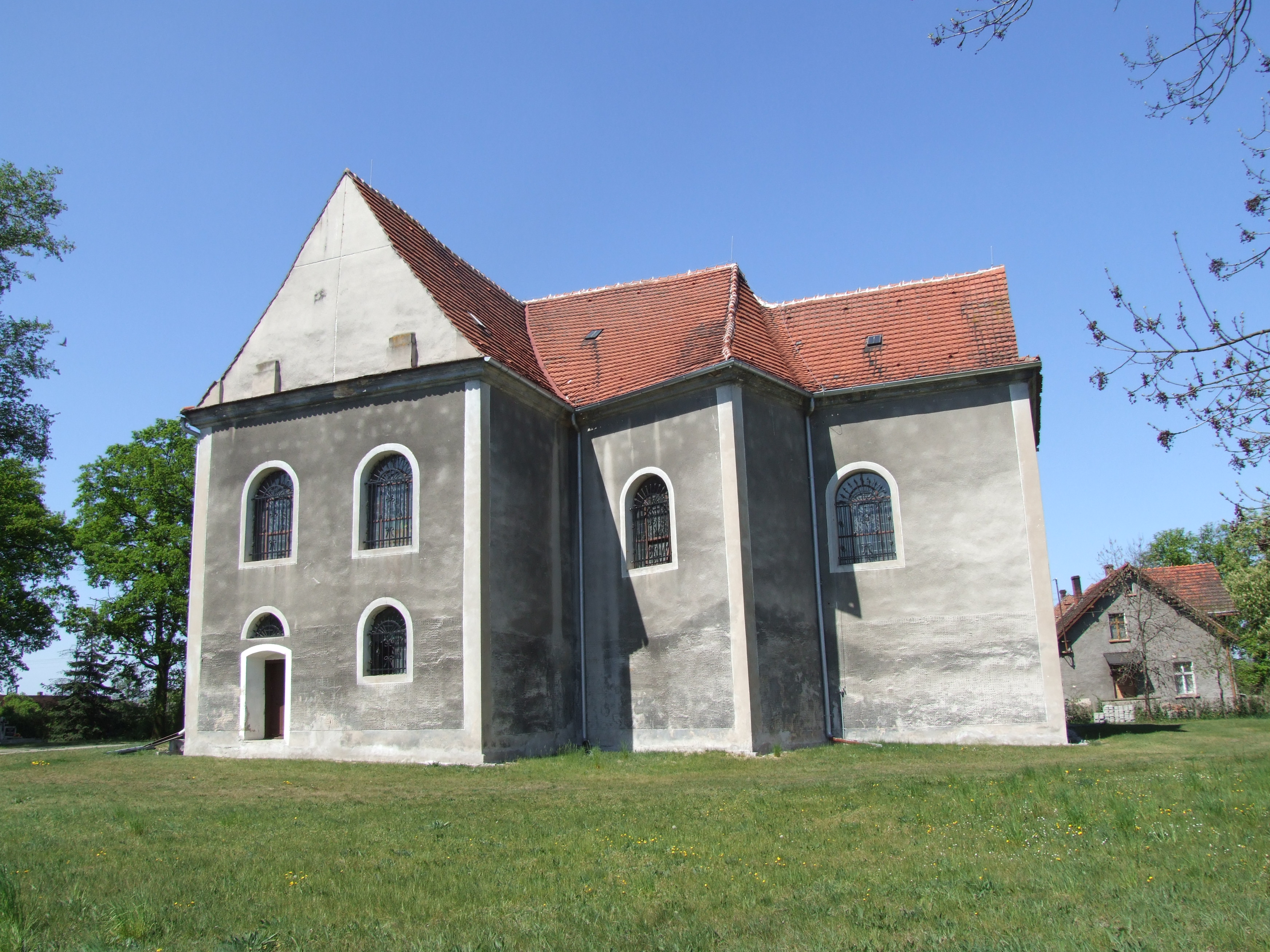
- Saint Anne Church

- Coat of arms

- Location within Poland
- Coordinates: 51°56′N 15°54′E
- Country: Poland
- Voivodeship: Lubusz
- County: Nowa Sól
- Gmina: Kolsko
- Population: 1,400
- Time zone: UTC+1 (CET)
  - Summer (DST): UTC+2 (CEST)
- Vehicle registration: FNW
- Primary airport: Zielona Góra Airport
- Website: konotop.pl

Konotop [kɔˈnɔtɔp] is a village in the administrative district of Gmina Kolsko, within Nowa Sól County, Lubusz Voivodeship, in western Poland.

The name of the village is of Polish origin and comes from the word koń, which means "horse".

== Notable residents ==
- Karl Wilhelm von Dieskau (1701–1777), Prussian general
- Hans Sigismund von Lestwitz (1718–1788), Prussian general
