= George Ernst von Klitzing =

- Born: 1698; Tornow, Prussia
- Died: 28 September 1759 (aged 60–61); Stettin
- Military career
- Allegiance: (Kingdom of Prussia) Prussia
- Branch: Army
- Service years: 1714–1759
- Rank: Major General

George Ernst von Klitzing (1698 in Prussia – 29 October 1759 in Stettin) was a Prussian major general of infantry and commander of the Klitzing Infantry (after 1806, called the Infantry Regiment No. 31). He was also the hereditary heir of Tornow.

== Origins ==
Klitzing was the son of Karl Magnus von Klitzing, Grand Warden, and his wife. Klitzing married on 15 March 1722 in Tornow to Wilhelmine Elisabeth von Mörner, from the House of Klössow (died 10 May 1769). They had the following children:

Charlotte Hedwig Maria ( 1723 in Zielenzig) ∞ von Rosenthal, Hauptmann
Luise Katharina Wilhelmine (1725) married first, Friedrich Ernst von Mörner, Danish Major; married second, von Glassey, Hauptmann
Hans Sigismund (14 October 1726 in Voigtsdorf).

== Military career ==
=== Silesian wars ===
Klitzing entered military service in 1714 as a corporal at the infantry regiment "Markgraf Albrecht". From 1729 he changed to the newly-expanded Fusilier Regiment "von Dossow". He had the dubious distinction of being the oldest first lieutenant in his regiment, until his promotion to captain in September 1730.

Klitzing participated in the Siege of Prague. He was promoted to major in 1743 by his commander, Friedrich Wilhelm von Varenne.

=== Seven Years' War ===
Klitsing was promoted to the lieutenant colonel in June 1751. For most of 1758 he served in Prince Henry's corps, tasked with holding Saxony. With other elements of Henry's force, the Prussians managed to guard Leipzig and its environs long enough for the Prussian artillery to pull out of the region.

In the action near Breslau, Klitzing led his troops against the enemy-occupied village of Kleinburg, he gave the individual fire orders as if he were in the parade ground. On 9 December 1758, he became Proprietor (Inhaber) of the regiment, the Klitzing Infantry (after 1806, called the Infantry Regiment No. 31). On the same day he was promoted to major general.

He fought at the Battle of Kay. At the Battle of Kunersdorf on 12 August 1759, he was shot twice through the arm. He was moved to Stettin with many of the other injured, where he died on 29 October 1759. He was buried three days later in the garrison church.
