= Friedland, Brandenburg =

Friedland
- Town
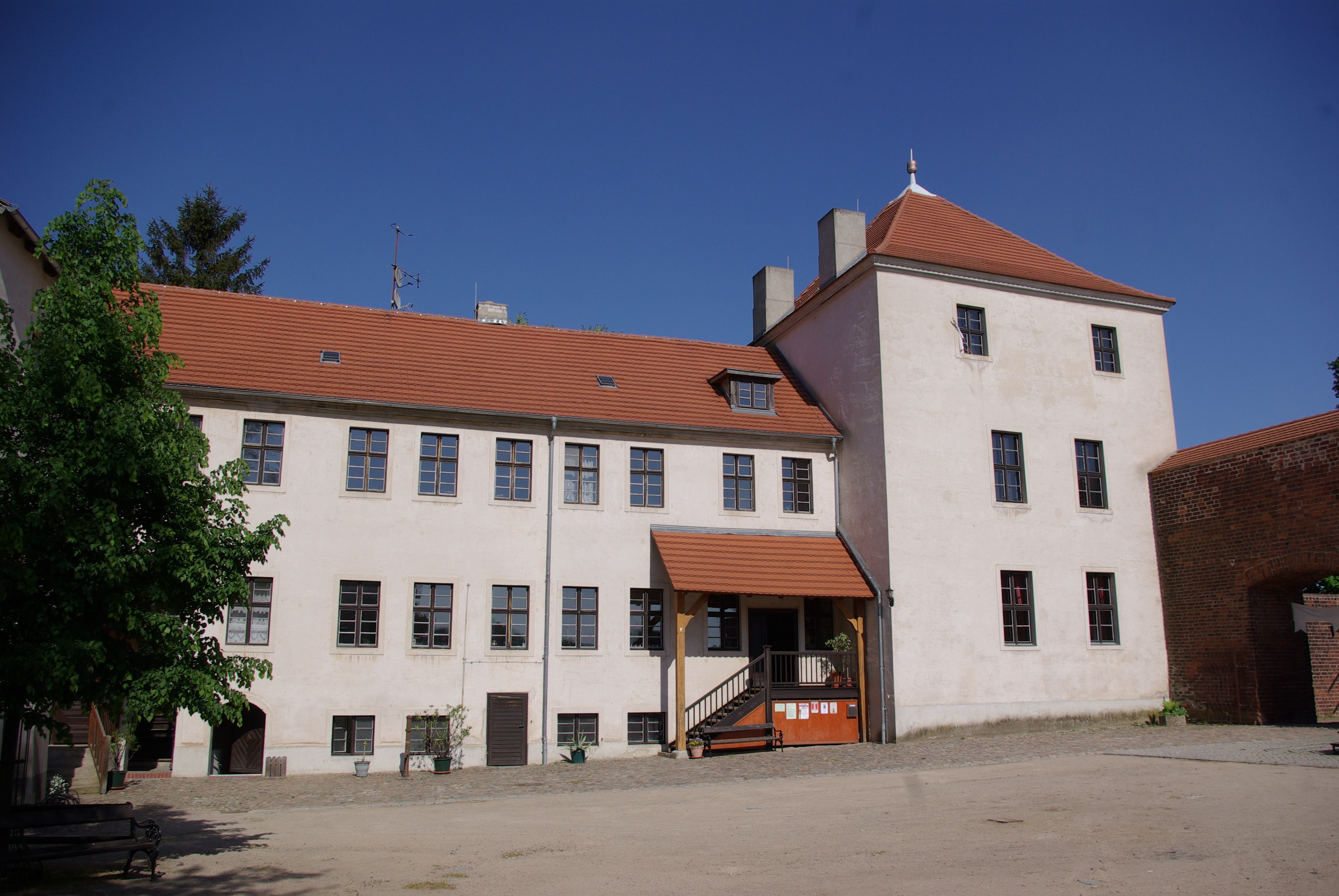
- Friedland Castle

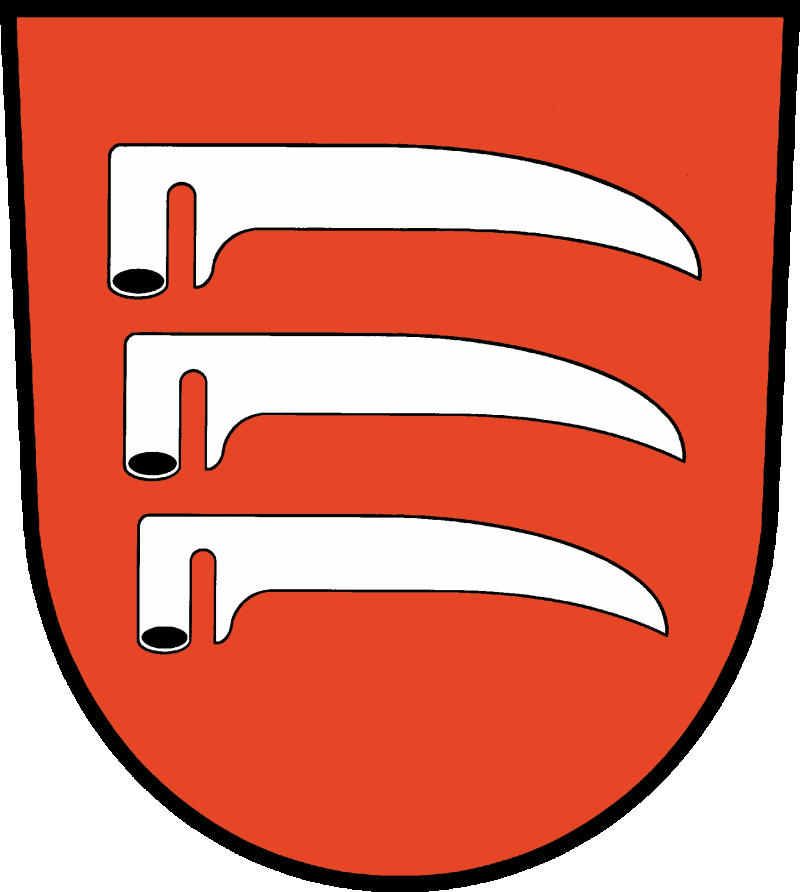
- Coat of arms

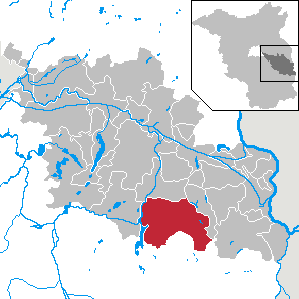
- Location of Friedland within Oder-Spree district
- Interactive map of Friedland
- Location within Germany Location within Brandenburg
- Coordinates: 52°06′N 14°16′E
- Country: Germany
- State: Brandenburg
- District: Oder-Spree
- Subdivisions: 16 districts

Government
  - Mayor (2020–28): Maik Koschack (Ind.)

Area
  - Total: 174.23 km^{2} (67.27 sq mi)
- Elevation: 50 m (160 ft)

Population (2025-12-31)
  - Total: 2,925
  - Density: 16.79/km^{2} (43.48/sq mi)
- Time zone: UTC+01:00 (CET)
  - Summer (DST): UTC+02:00 (CEST)
- Postal codes: 15848, 15868
- Dialling codes: 033676
- Vehicle registration: LOS
- Website: www.friedland-nl.de

Friedland (German pronunciation: [ˈfʁiːtˌlant]; Lower Sorbian: Bryland) is a town in the Oder-Spree district, in Brandenburg, Germany. It is situated in the historic Lower Lusatia region, about 8 km (5.0 mi) south of Beeskow, and 39 km (24 mi) north of Cottbus.

== History ==
Historical affiliations

March of Lusatia 1235-1367
Kingdom of Bohemia 1367-1469
Kingdom of Hungary 1469-1490
Kingdom of Bohemia 1490-1635
Electorate of Saxony 1635-1697
Poland-Saxony 1697-1706
Electorate of Saxony 1706-1709
Poland-Saxony 1709-1763
Electorate of Saxony 1763-1806
Kingdom of Saxony 1806-1815
Kingdom of Prussia 1815-1871
German Empire 1871-1918
Weimar Republic 1918-1933
Nazi Germany 1933-1945
Allied-occupied Germany 1945-1949
East Germany 1949-1990
Germany 1990-present

The town was first mentioned as Fredberg in a 1235 deed issued by the Lusatian margrave Henry III of Meissen. A 1301 contract signed by Margrave Frederick I named a town and castle of Vredeburch, then a possession of the Lords of Strehla, who served as ministeriales of the ruling House of Wettin. The present name first appeared in a 1350 bull issued by Pope Clement VI. With Lower Lusatia, Friedland passed under the suzerainty of the Bohemian Crown in 1367.

In 1518, the lordship was pawned to the Order of Saint John and turned Protestant in 1540. Under the rule of Lord Master Count Adam of Schwarzenberg, the fortifications were enlarged, nevertheless Friedland suffered severely under the impact of the Thirty Years' War. Upon the 1635 Peace of Prague, it passed with the Lusatias to the Electorate of Saxony. Under Master Prince John Maurice of Nassau-Siegen the lordship quickly recovered. Town privileges were confirmed in 1662, a Jewish community is documented since 1673.

After almost three-centuries rule of the Order of Saint John, Friedland was finally secularised to Saxony in 1811. Only four years later, the town passed to the Prussian province of Brandenburg upon the Final Act of the 1815 Vienna Congress.

From 1815 to 1947, Friedland was part of the Prussian Province of Brandenburg.

After World War II, Friedland was incorporated into the State of Brandenburg from 1947 to 1952 and the Bezirk Frankfurt of East Germany from 1952 to 1990. Since 1990, Friedland is again part of Brandenburg.

== Demography ==
Friedland is the least densely populated town ("Stadt") in Germany, just narrowly beating Baruth/Mark (also in Brandenburg) for that distinction.

Development of Schöneiche's population since 1875 within the current Boundaries (Blue Line: Population; Dotted Line: Comparison to Population development in Brandenburg state; Grey Background: Time of Nazi Germany; Red Background: Time of communist East Germany)

Recent Population Development and Projections (Population Development before Census 2011 (blue line); Recent Population Development according to the Census in Germany in 2011 (blue bordered line); Official projections for 2005-2030 (yellow line); for 2017-2030 (scarlet line); for 2020-2030 (green line)

Friedland: Population development
within the current boundaries (2020)

Year	Pop.	±% p.a.
1875	4,509	—
1890	4,397	−0.17%
1910	4,264	−0.15%
1925	4,212	−0.08%
1939	3,785	−0.76%
1950	5,534	+3.51%
1964	4,251	−1.87%

Year	Pop.	±% p.a.
1971	4,132	−0.40%
1981	3,480	−1.70%
1985	3,473	−0.05%
1990	3,457	−0.09%
1995	3,391	−0.38%
2000	3,428	+0.22%
2005	3,397	−0.18%

Year	Pop.	±% p.a.
2010	3,166	−1.40%
2015	3,017	−0.96%
2016	2,975	−1.39%
2017	2,959	−0.54%
2018	2,957	−0.07%
2019	2,985	+0.95%
2020	2,954	−1.04%
