= Hochberg =

Hochberg (German: high mountain) may refer to:

== Mountains ==
- Hochberg (Chiemgau), Bavaria, Germany
- Hochberg (Dahn), a hill in the Palatinate Forest, Germany
- Hochberg (Haardt), a mountain in the Palatinate Forest, Germany
- Hochberg (Lower Bavaria), Germany
- Hochberg (Swabian Jura), a mountain of the Swabian Alps, Baden-Württemberg, Germany

== Places ==
- Höchberg, a municipality in the district of Würzburg in Bavaria, Germany
- Hochberg, a borough of Remseck in Ludwigsburg in Baden-Württemberg
- Hochberg (Bad Saulgau), a district of Bad Saulgau in Sigmaringen in Baden-Württemberg
- Hochberg (Chiemgau), a district of Traunstein in Bavaria, Germany

== People ==
=== People ===
- Hochberg (noble family), an old Silesian noble family
- Margraves of Baden-Hochberg (formerly Baden-Hachberg)
- Reichsgrafen of Hochberg-Fürstenstein at castle Fürstenstein near Wałbrzych (Waldenburg) in Silesia, since 1848 Duke of Pless
- Count Leopold of Hochberg, later Leopold, Grand Duke of Baden

=== People surnamed Hochberg ===
- Adam Hochberg, radio correspondent for National Public Radio
- Alexander Hochberg (1905–1984), German aristocrat
- Hans Heinrich XV von Hochberg (1861–1938), German land owner and politician
- Audrey Hochberg (1933–2005), New York politician
- Burt Hochberg (1933–2006), American expert on chess and other games and puzzles
- Faith S. Hochberg (born 1950), United States federal judge
- Fred Hochberg (born 1952), American academic and political administrator
- Isidore Hochberg, birth name of Yip Harburg (1896–1981), American songwriter
- Karl Höchberg (1853–1885), German social-reformist writer, publisher and economist
- Louise Caroline of Hochberg (1768–1820), second wife of Margrave and, later, Grand Duke Charles Frederick of Baden
- Michael Hochberg (born 1980), American physicist
- Michael E. Hochberg, American population biologist
- Netanel Hochberg (died 1983), Israeli agronomist
- Scott Hochberg (born 1953), member of the Texas House of Representatives
- Yosef Hochberg (1945–2013), statistician
