= Książ Castle =

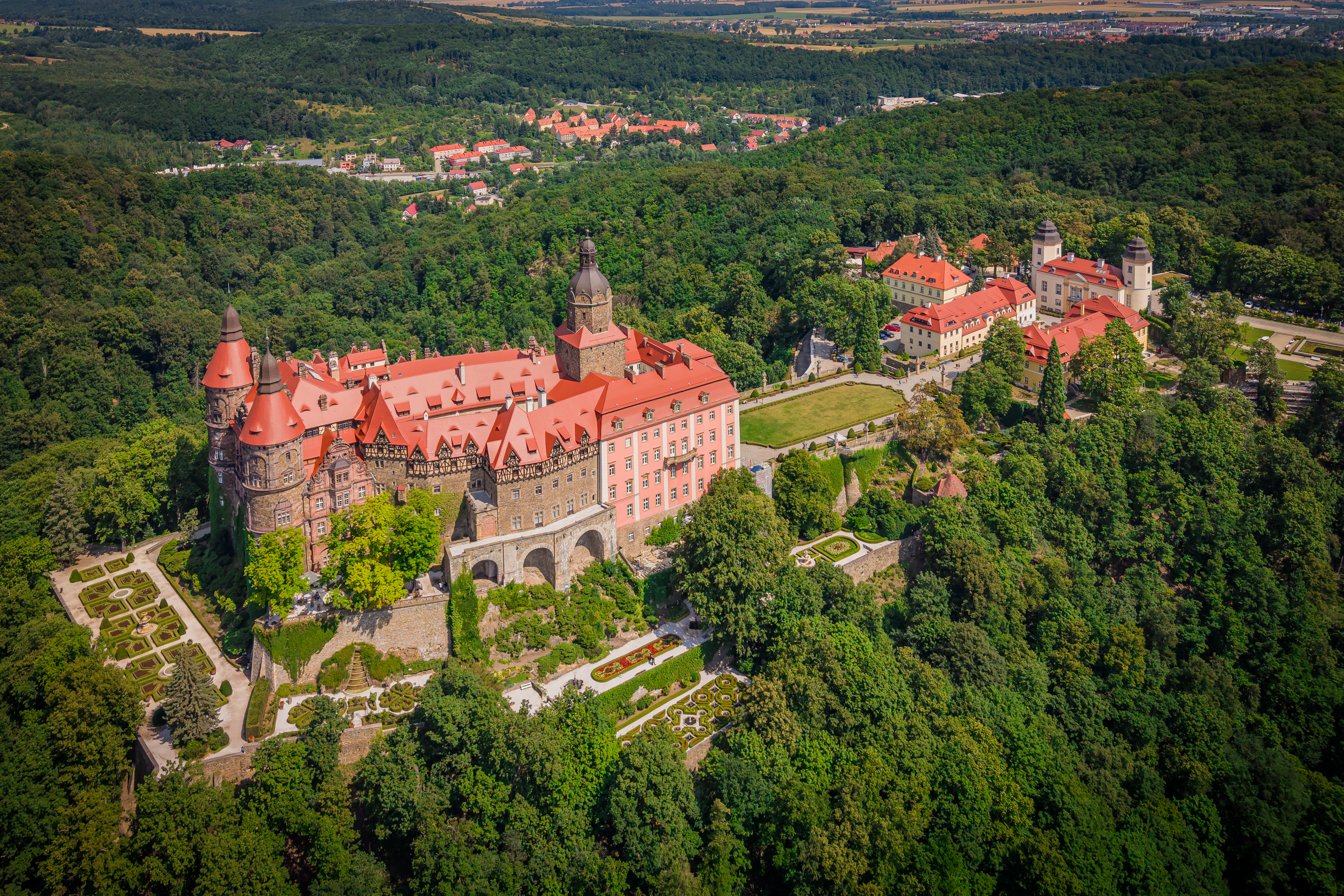
- Aerial view of the castle complex from the southern side
- Interactive map of the Książ Castle area

General information
- Architectural style: Gothic, Baroque, Rococo
- Location: Wałbrzych, Poland
- Coordinates: 50°50′32″N 16°17′30″E
- Construction started: 1288
- Completed: 1292
- Renovated: 1946–1953
- Owner: Książ Landscape Park and Castle Museum

Website
- www.en.ksiaz.walbrzych.pl

Historic Monument of Poland
- Designated: 2025-07-31
- Reference no.: Dz. U., 2025, No. 1089

Książ Castle (Polish: Zamek Książ, pronounced [kɕɔ̃ʂ]; German: Schloss Fürstenstein) is a castle in northern Wałbrzych in Lower Silesian Voivodeship, Poland. The largest castle in the region of Silesia, it is the third-largest in Poland behind Malbork Castle and Wawel Castle. It lies within Książ Landscape Park, a protected area located in the Sudeten Mountains and Sudeten Foreland. The castle overlooks the gorge of the Pełcznica river and is one of Wałbrzych's main tourist attractions.

== History ==
A first fortification at the site was destroyed by the Bohemian forces of King Ottokar II in 1263. The Silesian duke Bolko I the Strict (d. 1301), ruler in Świdnica and Jawor, had a new castle built from 1288 to 1292 and took his residence here. The castle was first documented in 1293, when Bolko I added Lord of Fürstenberg (the name of the castle in contemporary documents, with early Middle High German variants like „Wrstenberc“ in 1293 and „Furstenberc“ in 1301) to his titles. The name later evolved to „Fürstenstein“ (first attested as „Fürstinsteyn“ in 1367, then „Fürstenstain“ in 1515, and standardized as „Fürstenstein“ from the 19th century onward) and remained the official name of the castle until 1945.

The burgraviate included the neighbouring settlements of Świebodzice (Freiburg), Szczawno (Salzbrunn), and Pełcznica (Polsnitz). When the last Świdnica duke Bolko II the Small died in 1368 without children, the castle's estates passed to the Luxembourg king Wenceslaus IV of Bohemia, the son of Bolko's niece Anne, while his widow Agnes of Habsburg reserved the usufruct for herself. After her death in the year 1392, King Wenceslaus, also King of the Romans since 1376, seized the Duchy of Świdnica and obtained Książ Castle.

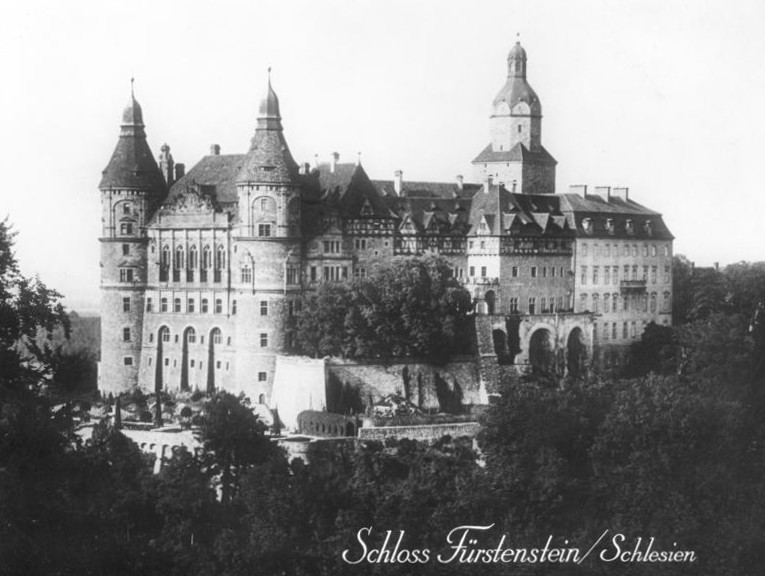
The castle in the 1920s

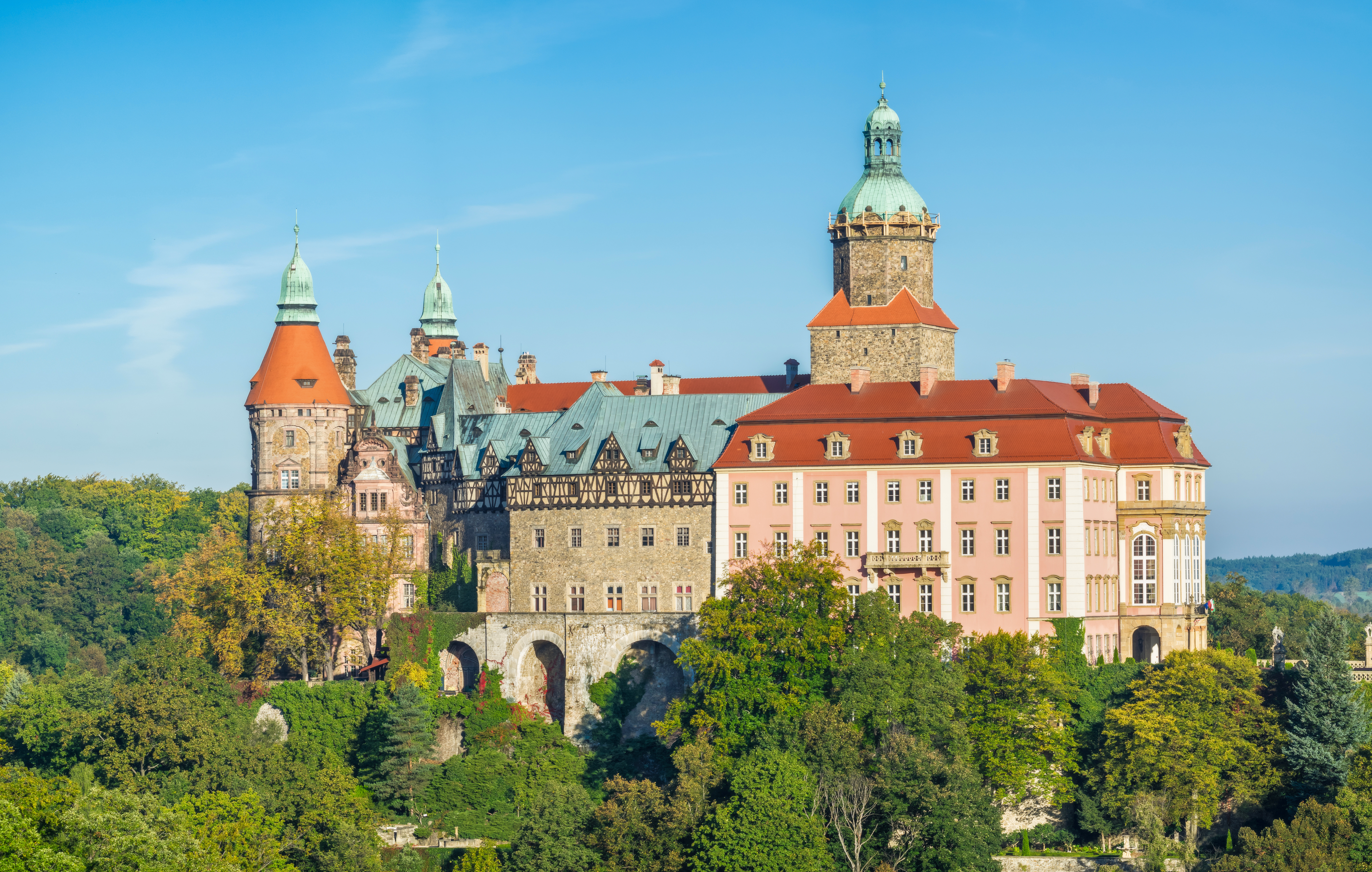
The castle in 2014

As Agnes, contrary to her limited real rights, had sold the Książ estates, the castle passed through many hands. In 1401 it was obtained by the Bohemian noble Janko of Chotěmice (d. after 1442), who later rose to a governor of the Świdnica-Jawor lands. During the Hussite Wars, the castle was captured by the insurgents and occupied in 1428–1429. After Janko's death, the Bohemian king George of Poděbrady acquired Książ from his descendants and transferred the administration to the Moravian general Birka of Nasiedle. In 1466 Hans von Schellendorf obtained the castle from the Bohemian Crown.

The second castle complex was devastated in 1482 by Georg von Stein, a military commander in the service of the Hungarian king Matthias Corvinus while his forces campaigned in Silesia. Stein granted Frederick von Hochberg the estates, his descendant Konrad I von Hochberg obtaining the castle hill in 1509. The von Hochberg family were elevated to the rank of Freiherren (Baron) in 1650, Graf (Count) in 1666, and Imperial counts (Reichsgrafen) in 1683, and owned the castle until 1944.

From the mid 16th century onwards the premises were rebuilt in a lavish Renaissance style.

During World War II, the castle was taken over by the German military authorities in 1944. Count Hans Heinrich XVII of Hochberg, Prince of Pless, had moved to England in 1932 and become a British citizen; moreover, his brother Count Alexander of Hochberg, who held dual German and Polish citizenship and owner of Pszczyna Castle in Upper Silesia, had apparently served with the Polish army in 1939. Supervised by SS and Organisation Todt personnel, the building complex at Fürstenstein became part of the vast underground Project Riese complex, presumably a projected Führer Headquarter and a future abode for Adolf Hitler.This is, however, disputed. Construction works were carried out by forced labourers and inmates of Gross-Rosen concentration camp. The castle was subsequently occupied by Red Army forces in the wake of the Vistula–Oder Offensive in 1945. A memorial marks the site of the Fürstenstein subcamp. Parts of the historic building structure were demolished during reconstruction; numerous artefacts were stolen or destroyed during the Soviet occupation.

After the war the castle complex was taken over by communist authorities and served as a recreation home and cultural centre. In recent years, large parts of the interior have been elaborately restored. Parts of the tunnel complex beneath the castle are currently used by the Polish Academy of Sciences for gravimeter measuring, while several WWII-era tunnels are accessible to the public on guided tours.

== Importance ==
- The castle contains 400 rooms and occupies an area of approximately 11,000 square meters.
- Książ Castle is a major tourist attraction of Lower Silesia attracting over 300,000 visitors annually.
- Each year, the castle hosts the Festival of Flowers and Art, a cultural event featuring flower and hand-made crafts exhibitions.
- In 2014, a fire broke out in the attic of the eastern part of the castle's wing, which resulted in significant losses as nearly 500 square meters of roof and attic area were destroyed.
- In 2018, the castle was voted as one of the Seven Wonders of Poland, a list compiled on the 100th anniversary of Poland regaining its independence.
- In 2021, the National Bank of Poland issued a special 5-zloty commemorative coin featuring Książ Castle as part of a series "Discover Poland".

== Gallery ==
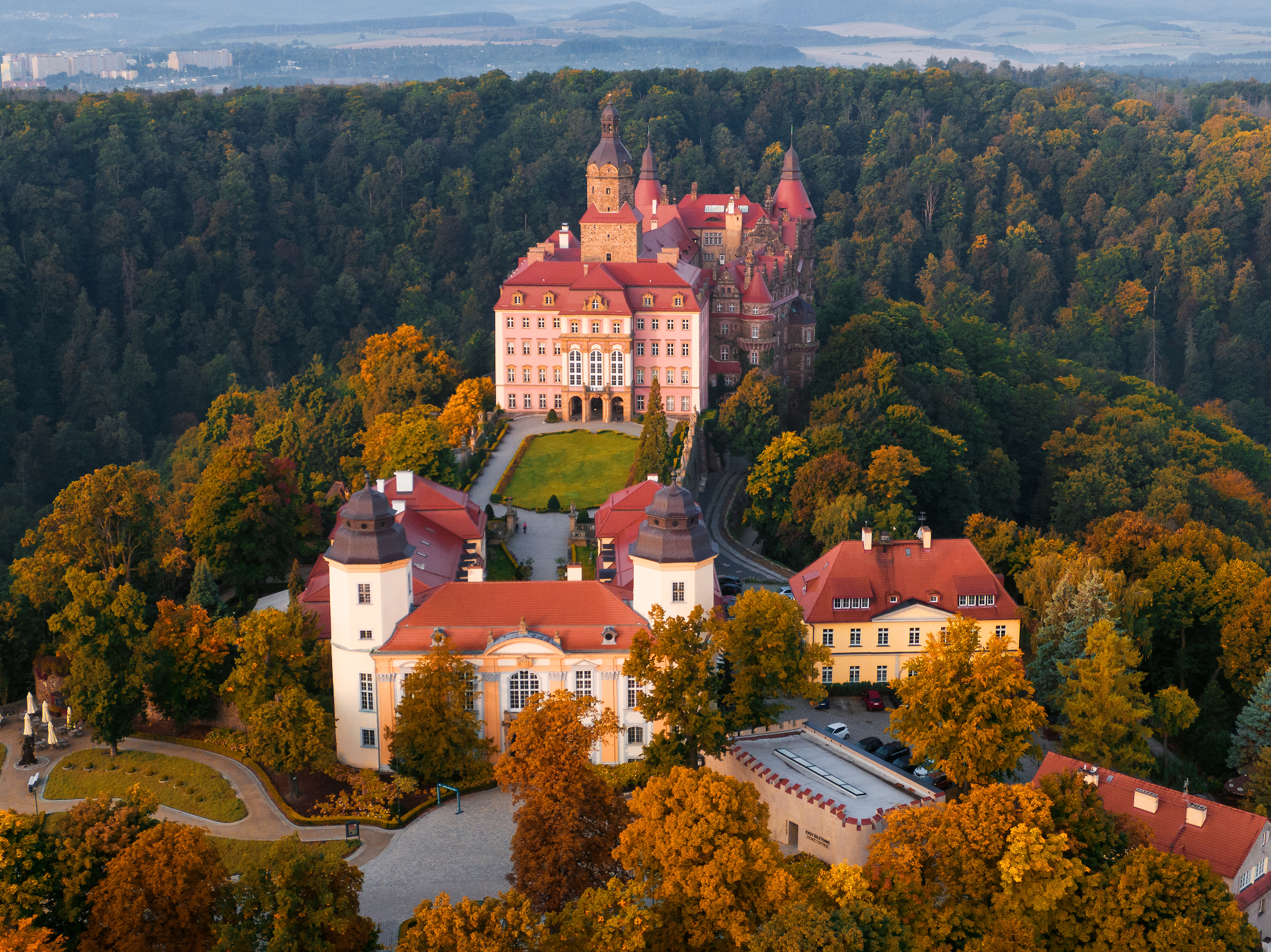
Aerial view

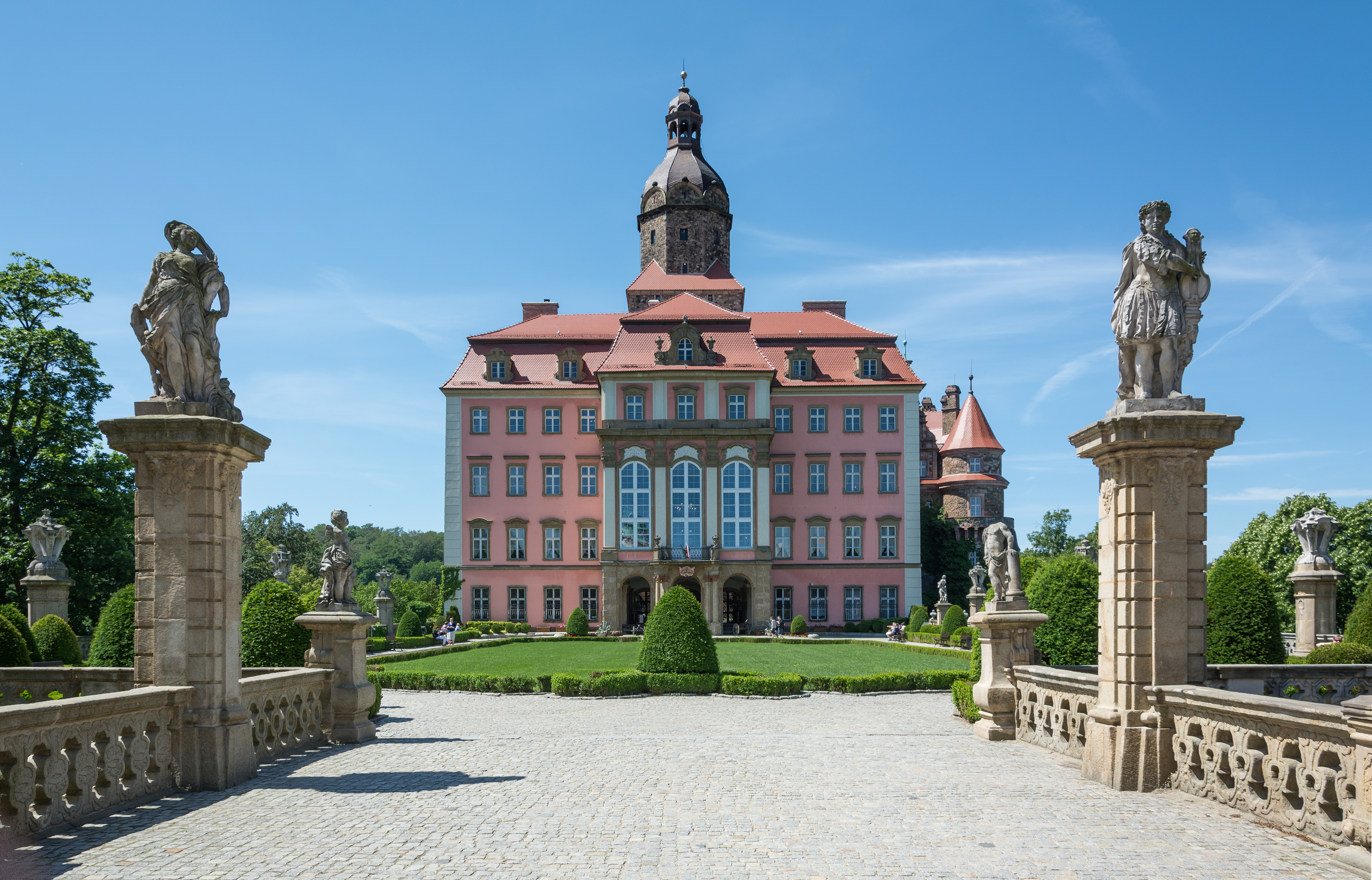
Front view

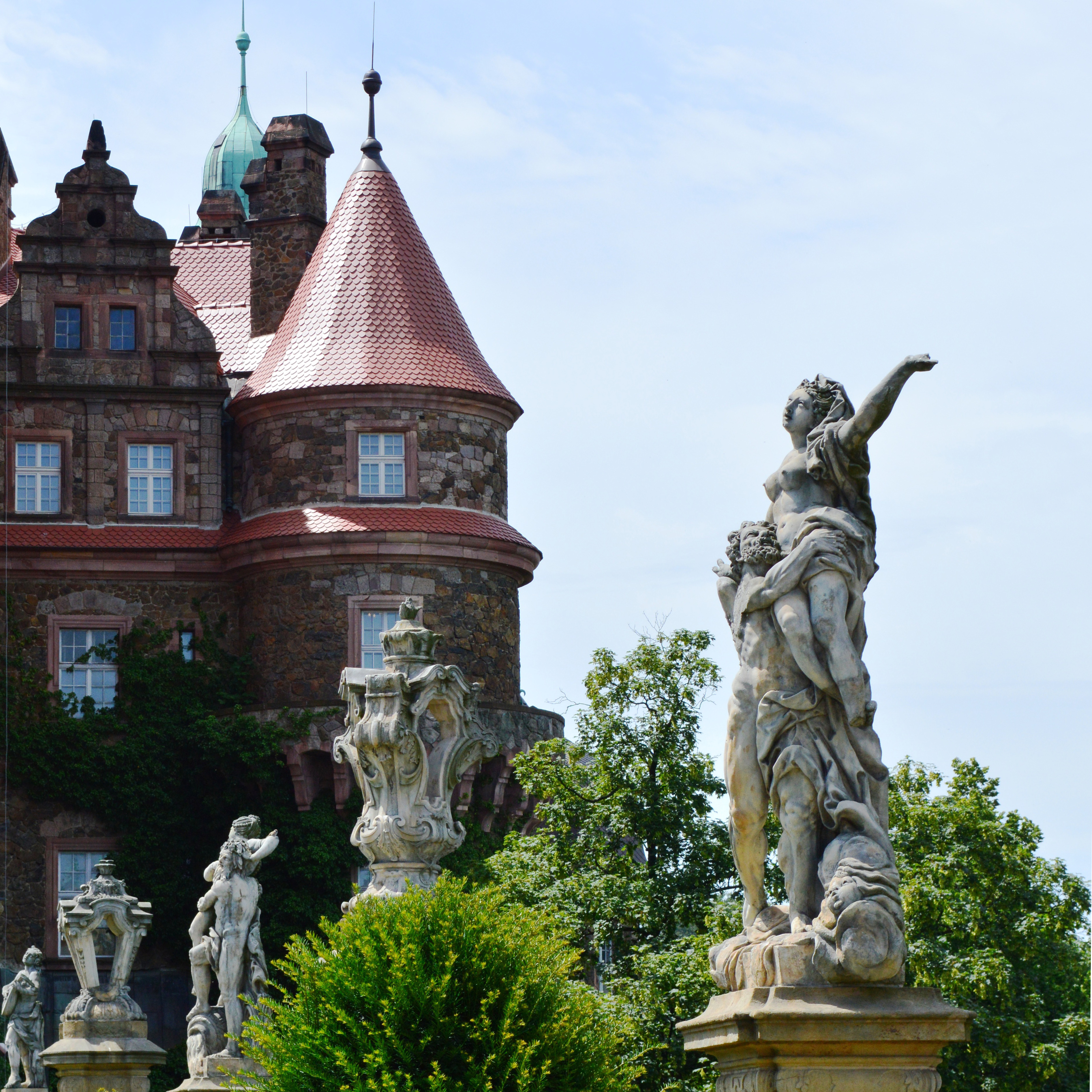
Sculptures in the castle gardens

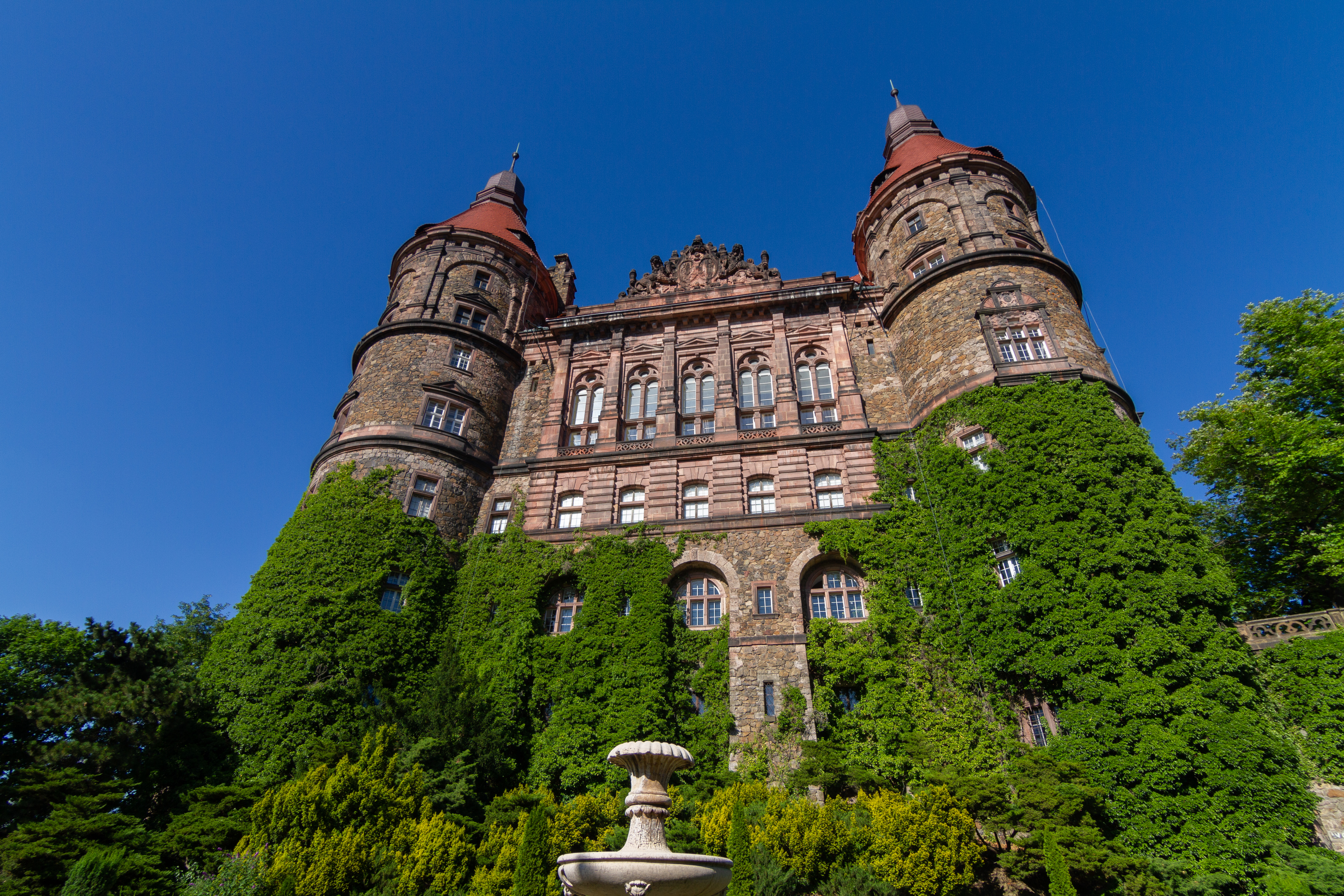
Rear view

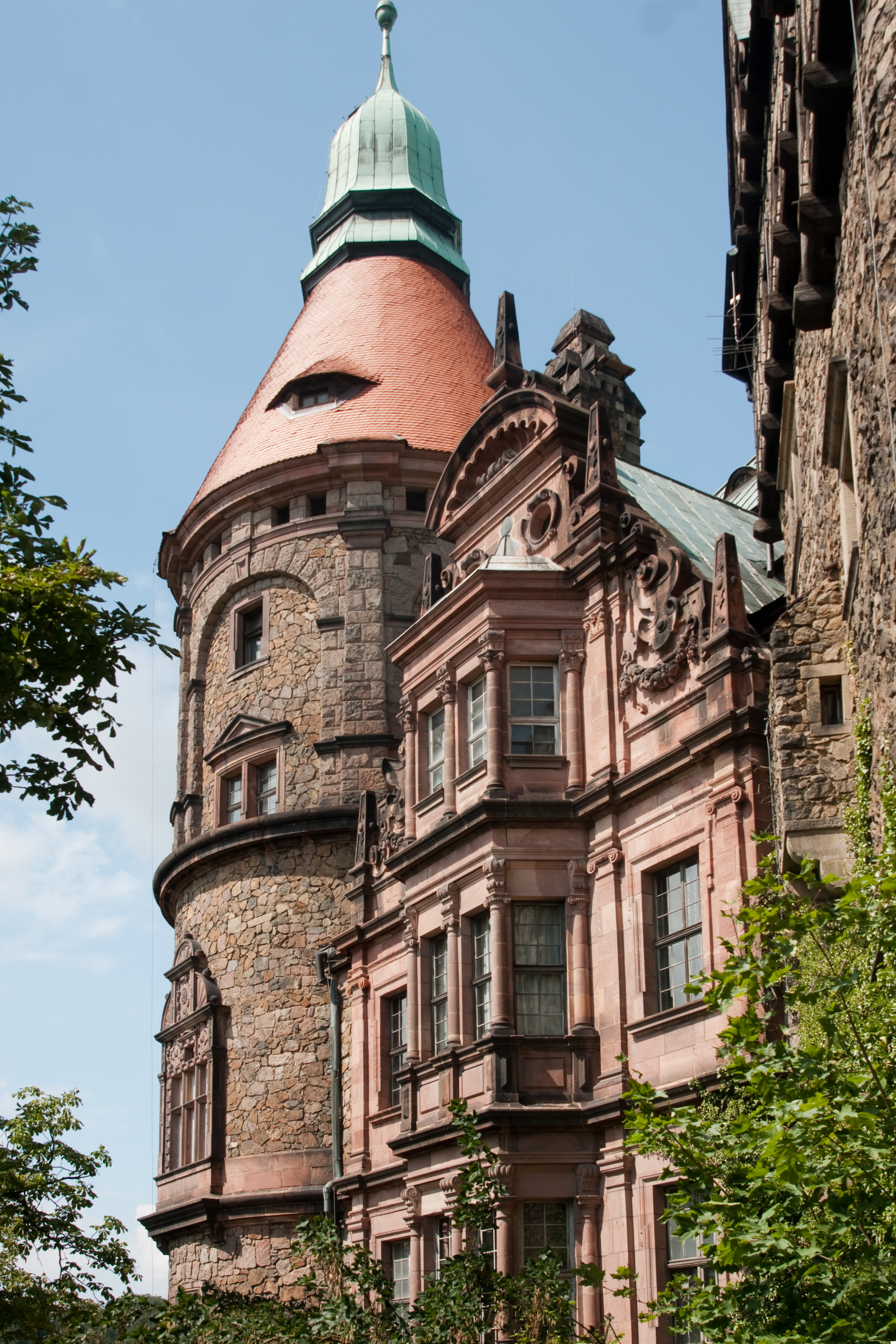
Castle tower

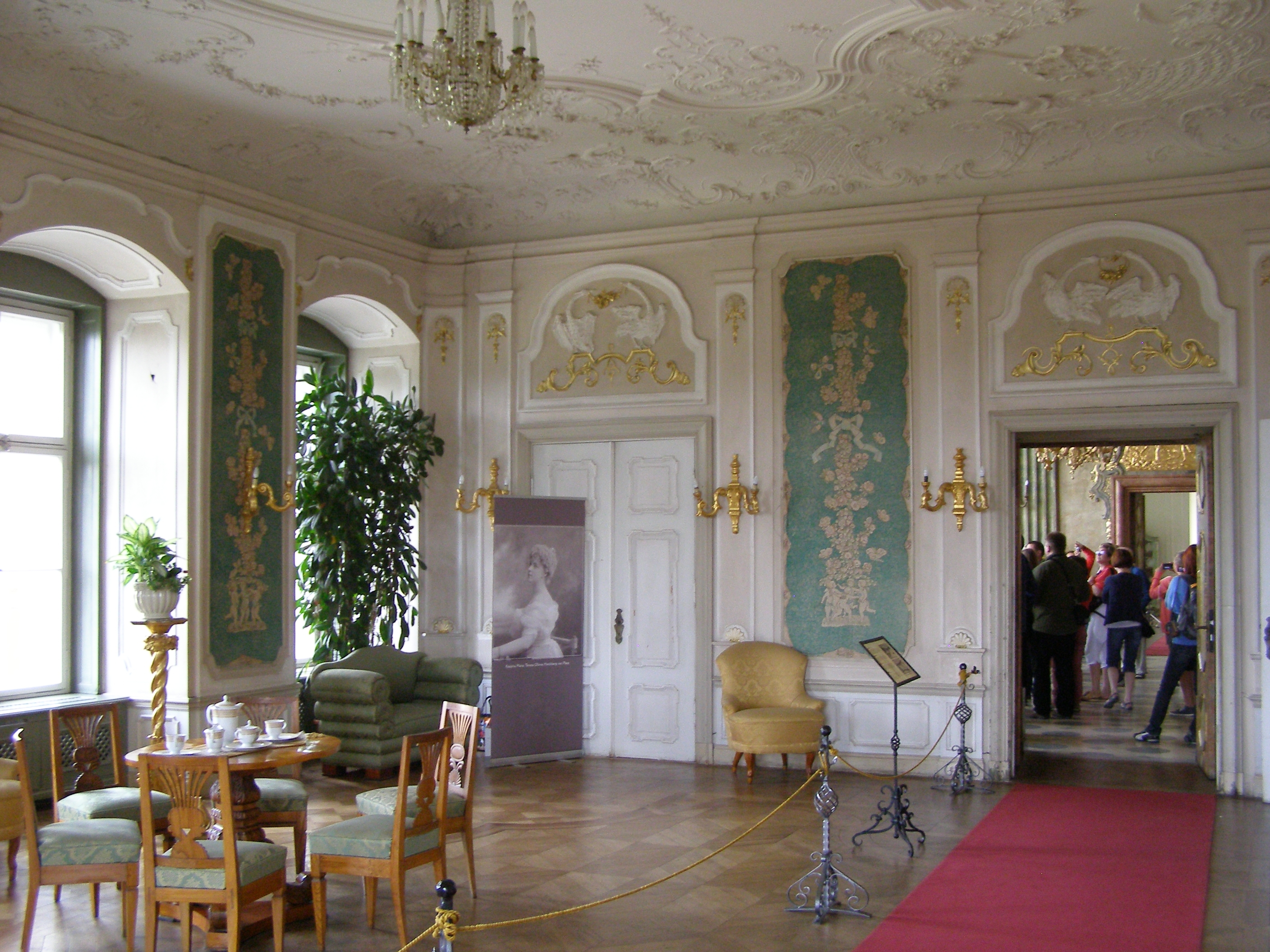
Castle interiors

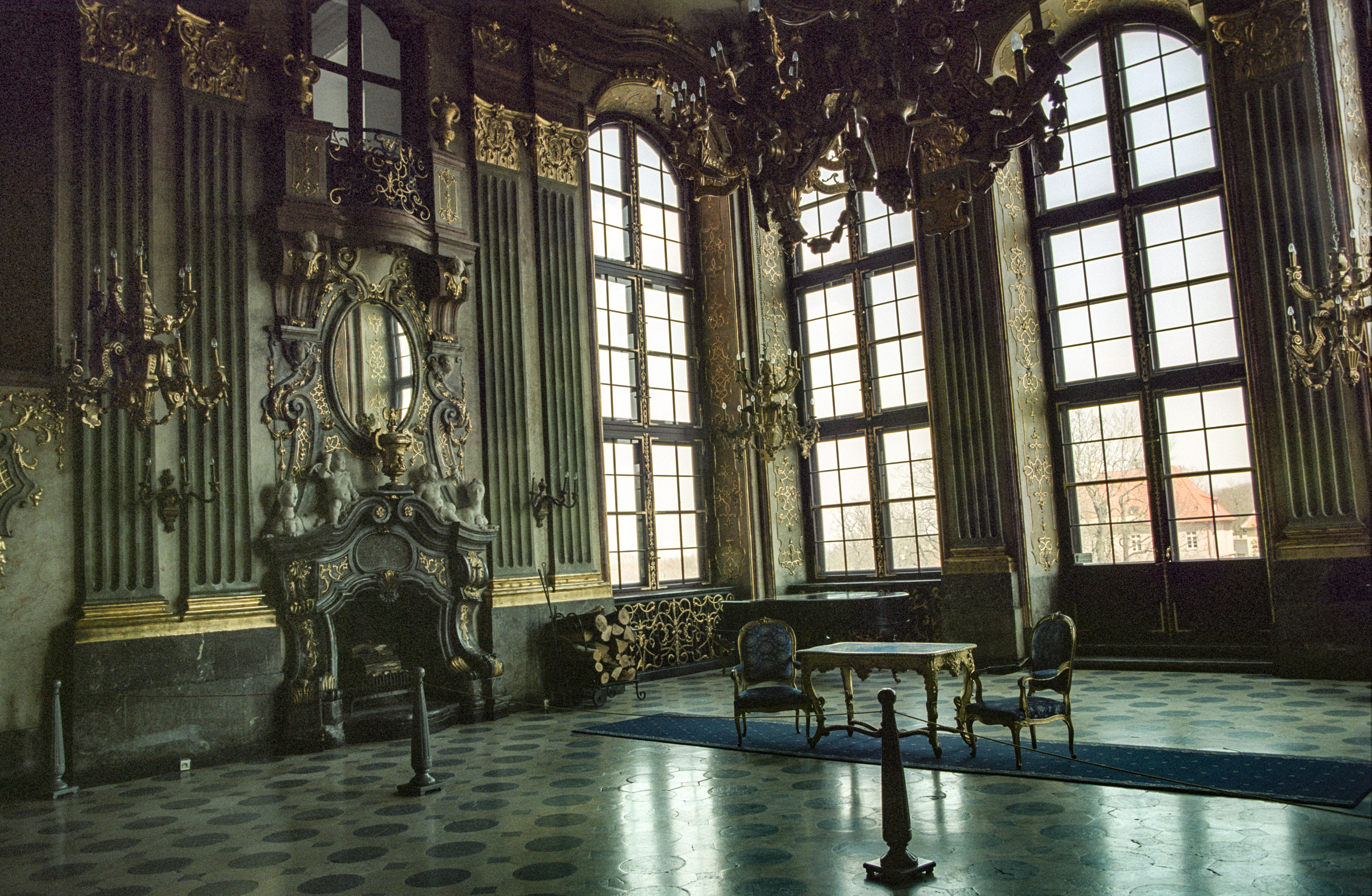
Maximillian's Hall

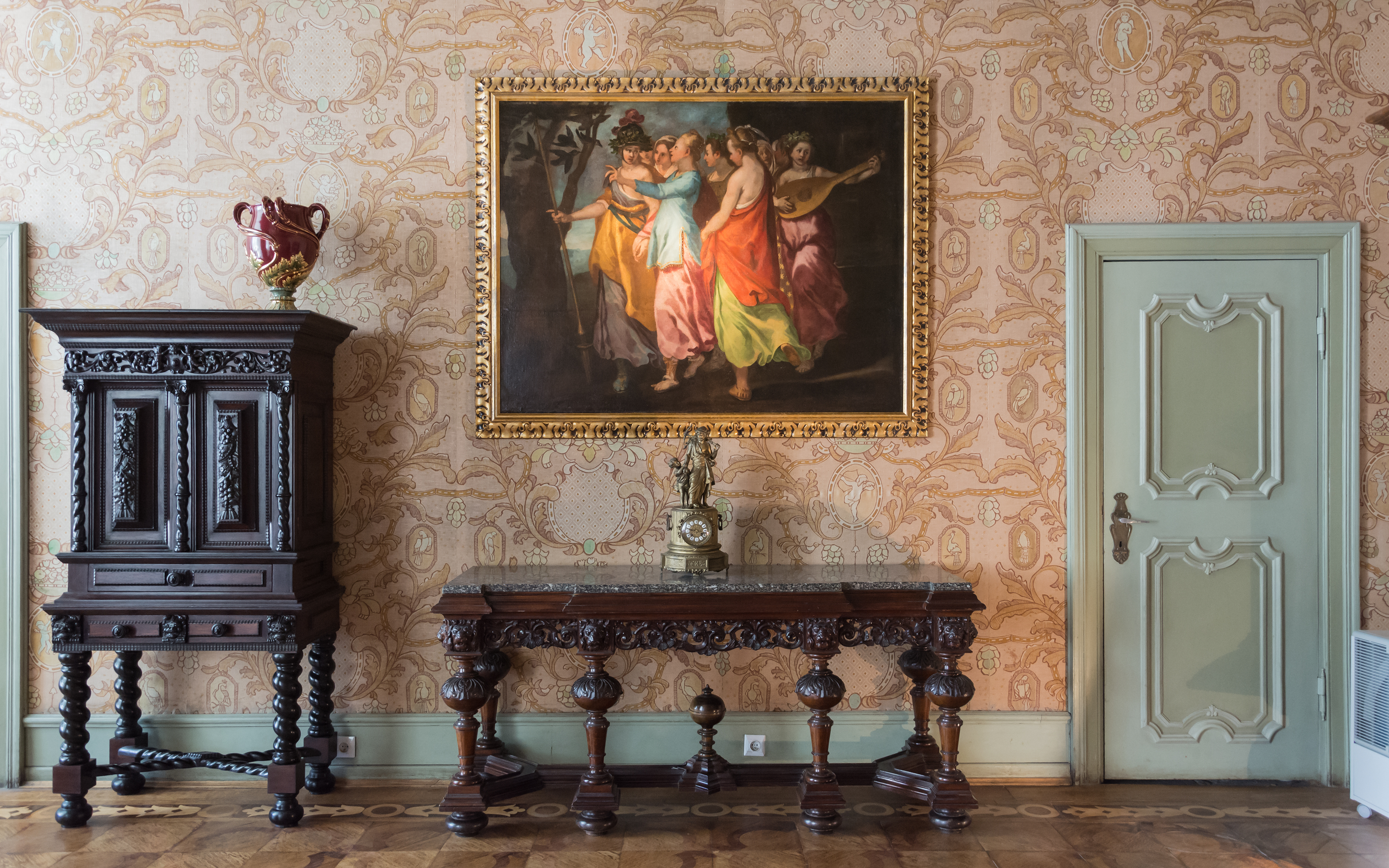
The Baroque Room

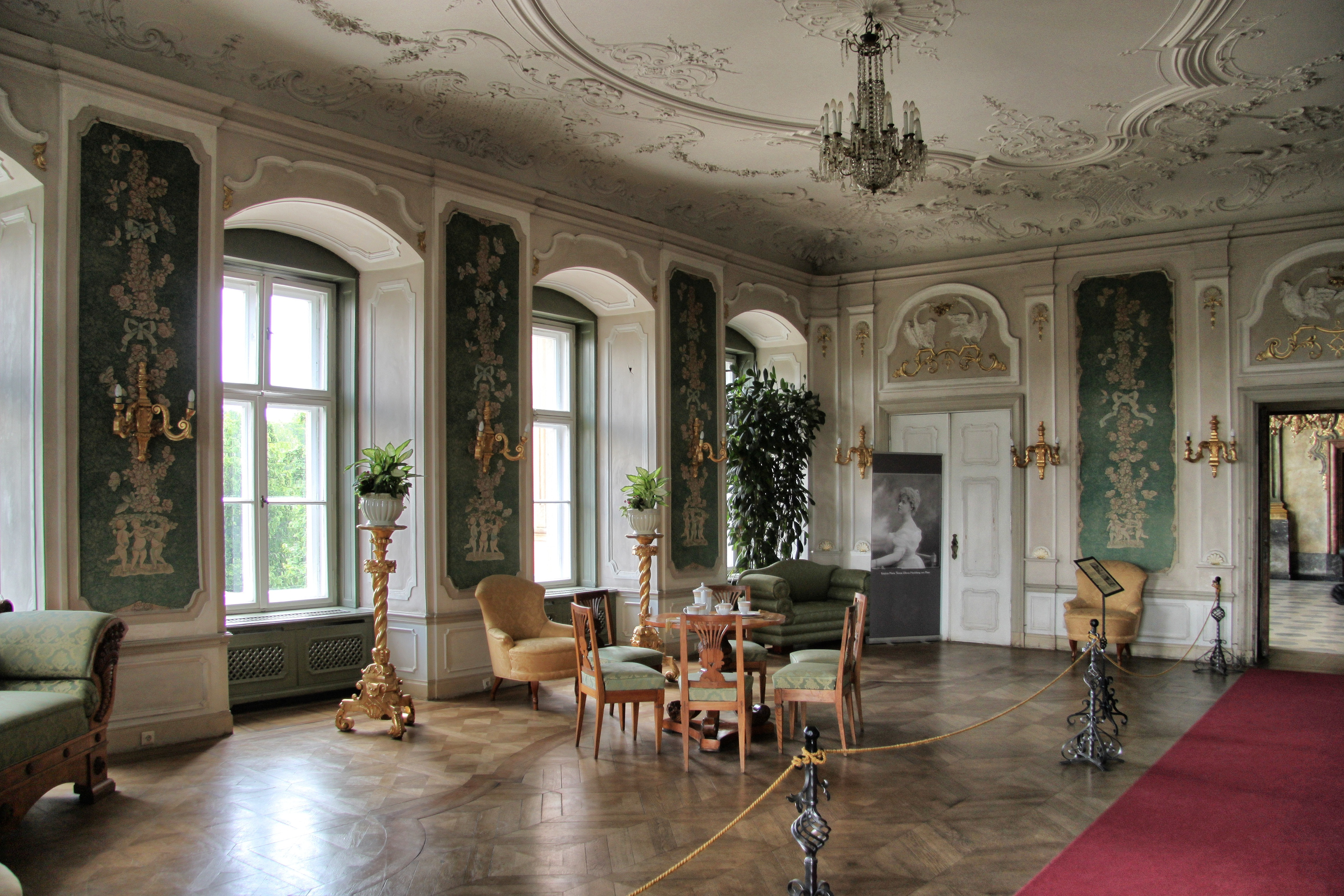
The Green Room

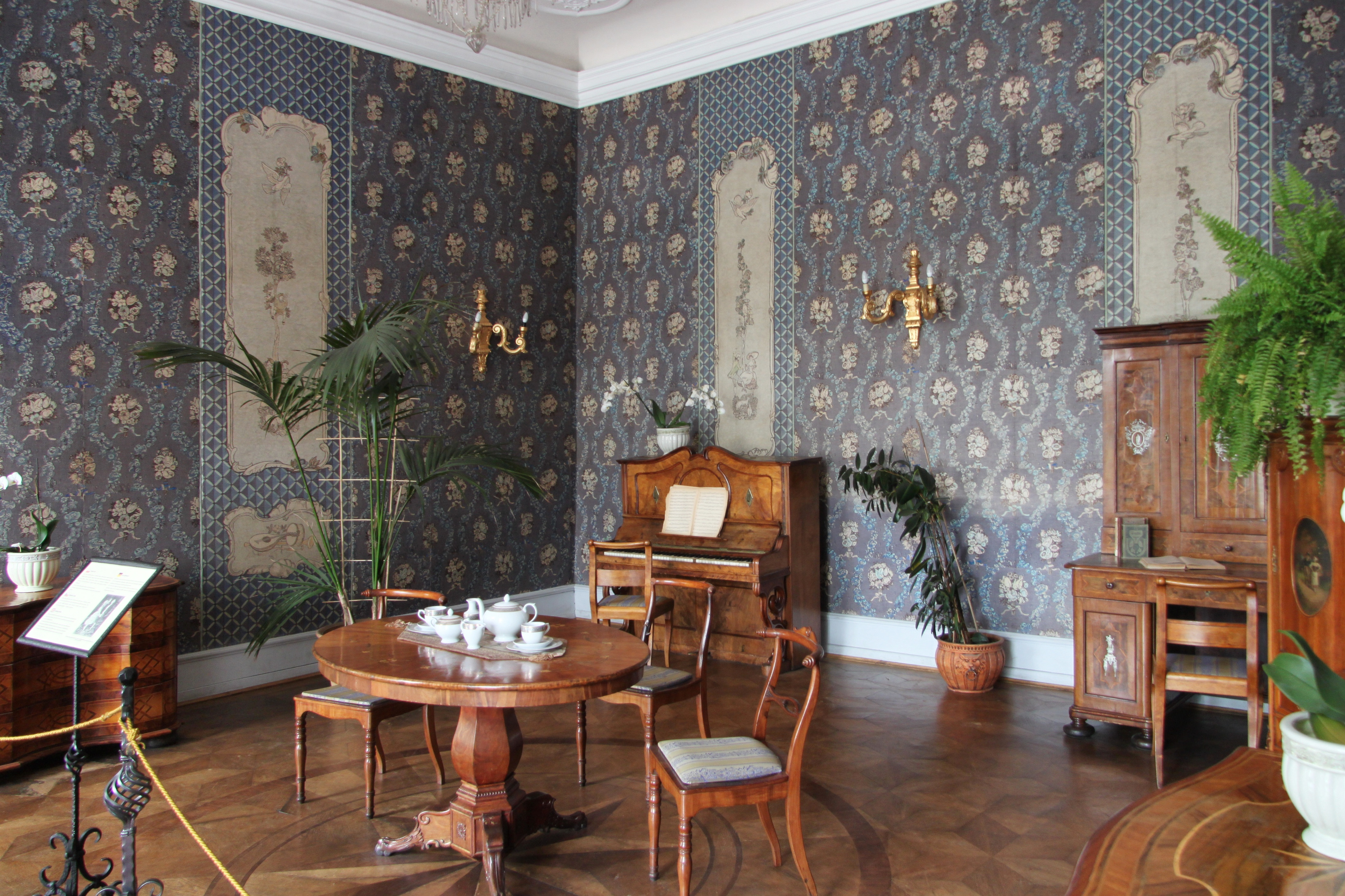
The Playroom

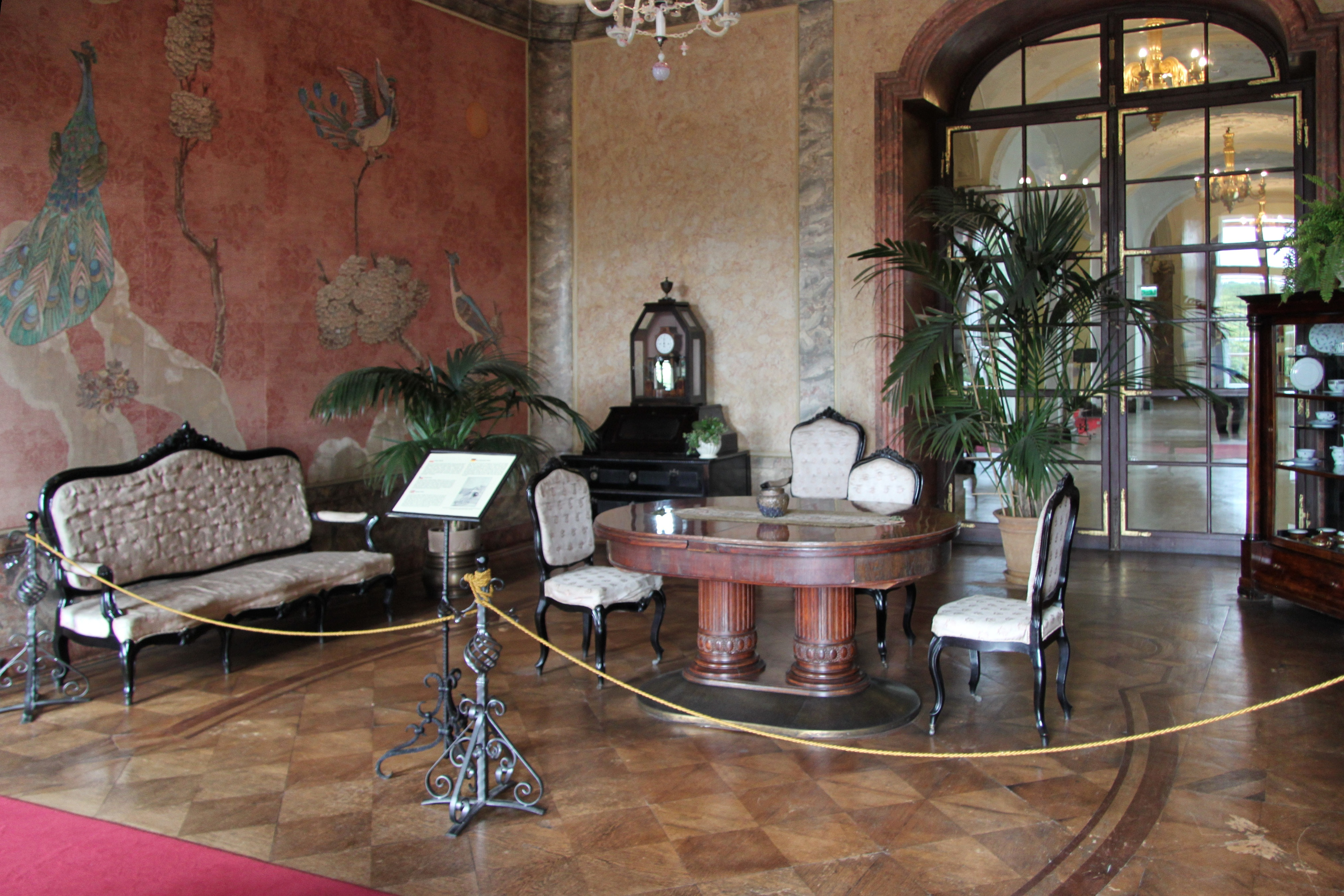
Chinese Salon

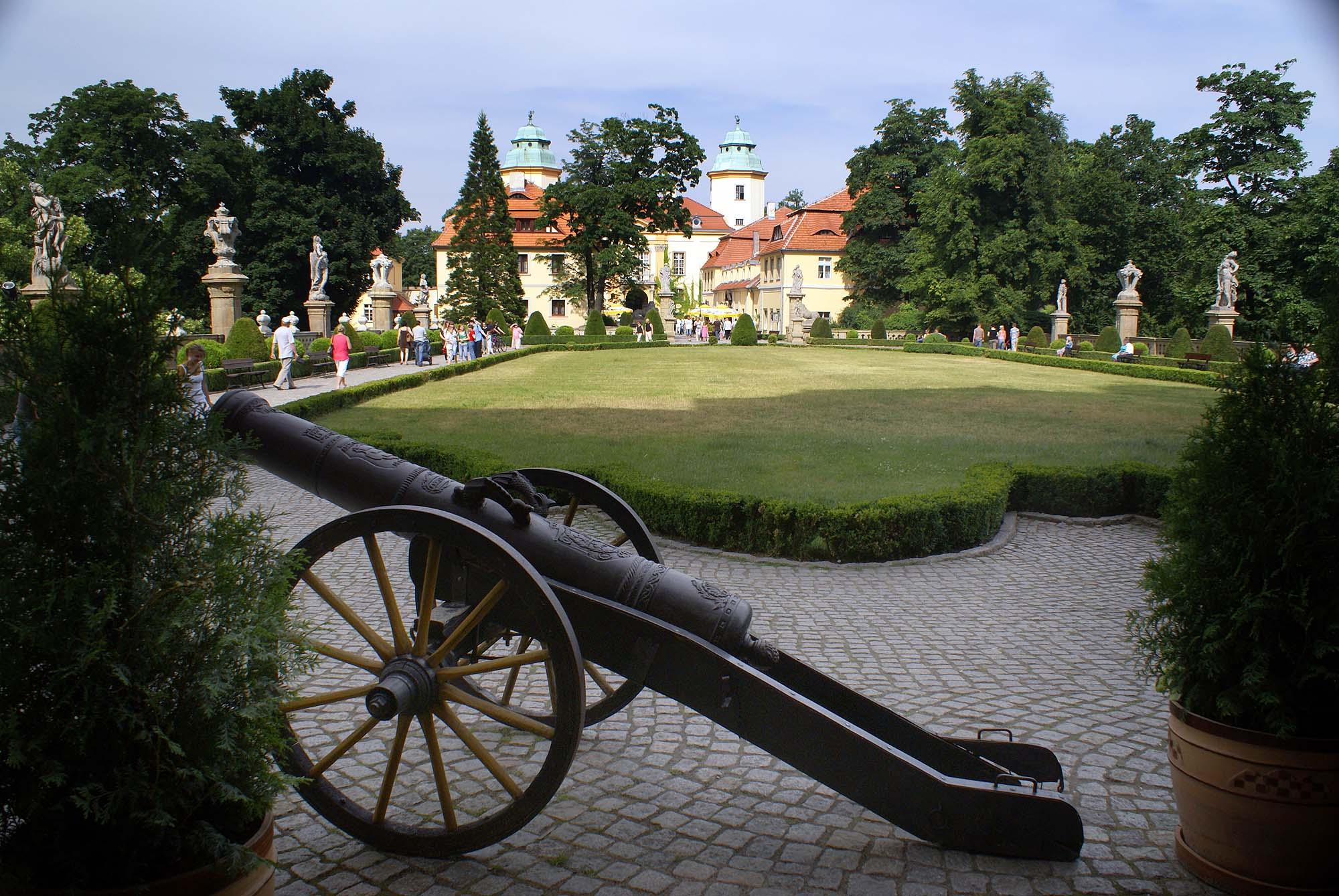
Court d'honneur

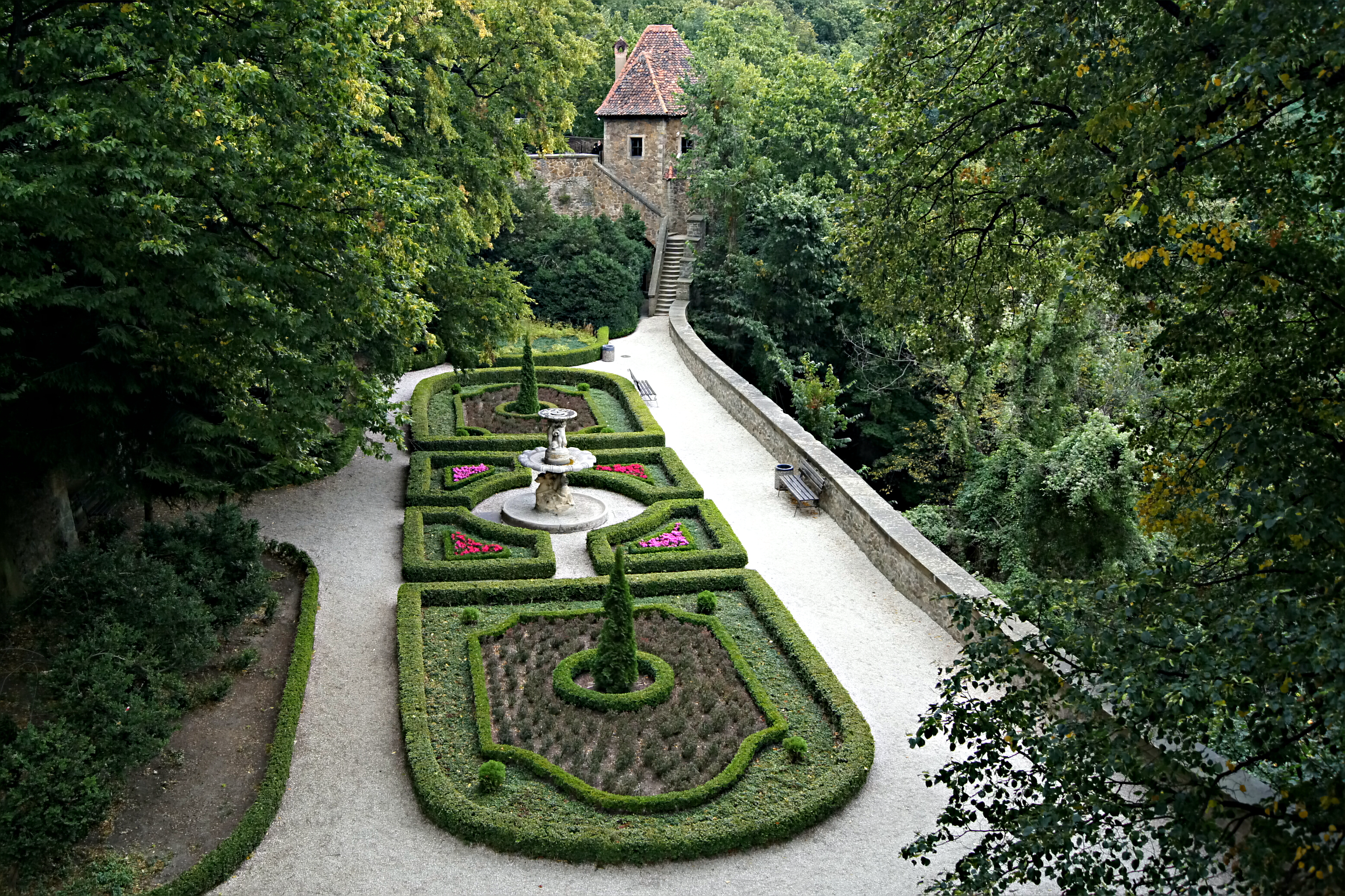
Castle terrace

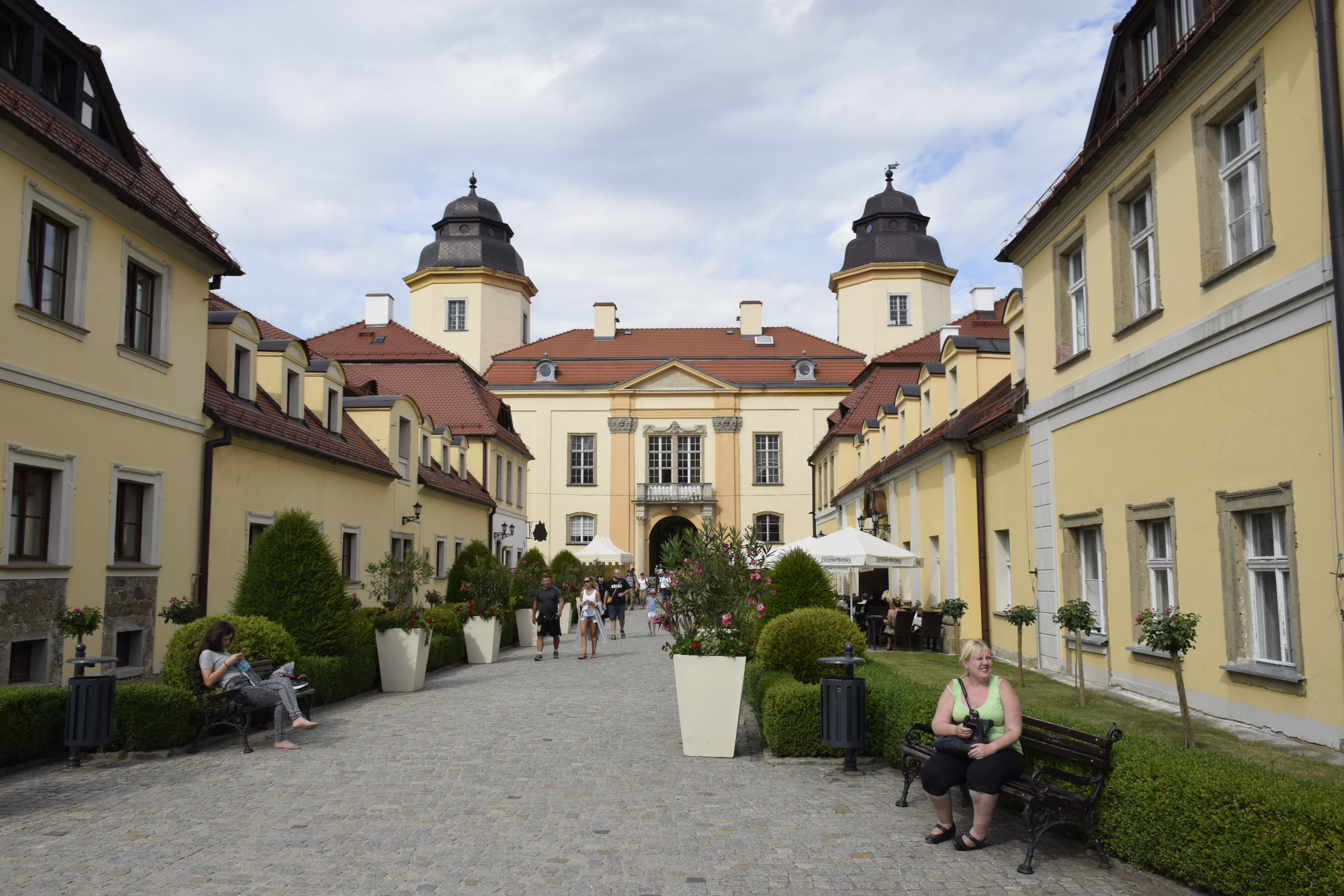
Gate buildings

== Surroundings ==
- Cisy Castle
- Gola Castle
- Cistercian monastery at Henryków
- Wojsławice Arboretum

== See also ==
- Castles in Poland
- Project Riese
