= Hans Heinrich XV von Hochberg =

Hans Heinrich XV
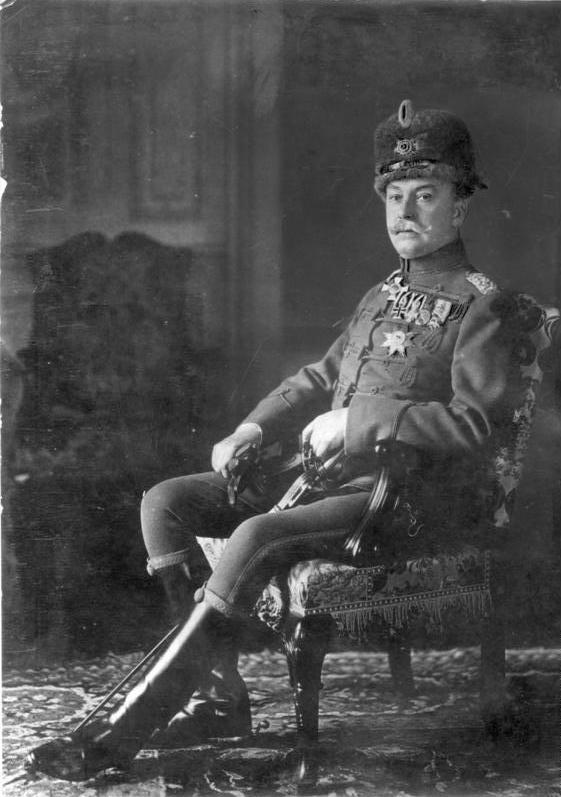

Prince of Pless
- Reign: 14 September 1907 – 31 January 1938
- Predecessor: Hans Heinrich XI
- Successor: Hans Heinrich XVII
- Born: 23 April 1861; Pless, Silesia, Prussia (now Pszczyna, Poland)
- Died: 31 January 1938 (aged 76); Paris, France
- Spouse: Mary Theresa Olivia Cornwallis-West (m. 1891; div. 1922) Clotilde de Silva y Gonzales de Candamo (m. 1925; div. 1934)
- Issue: Hans Heinrich XVII; Alexander; Bolko; Beatrice; Conrad
- House: Hochberg
- Father: Hans Heinrich XI
- Mother: Marie von Kleist

Hans Heinrich XV von Hochberg (Polish: Jan Henryk XV; 23 April 1861 – 31 January 1938) was Prince of Pless (Pszczyna), Count of Hochberg and Baron of Fürstenstein (Książ). He was the husband (1891–1923) of Mary Theresa Olivia Hochberg von Pless, also known as Princess Daisy.

A member of one of the wealthiest European noble families, he was the owner of large estates and coal mines in the Prussian province of Silesia. Following the partition of Upper Silesia in 1922, his holdings were divided between Germany and Poland. In the interwar period, his businesses faced financial difficulties and prolonged tax disputes with the Polish authorities. His business brought him enormous fortune and his extravagant lifestyle coupled with political and family scandals were reported on by the international press.

The historical drama Magnat (1987) was based on the life of Hans Heinrich and his naturalized-Polish son Alexander between both World Wars. The film featured stars of Polish cinema.

== Biography ==
=== Early life ===
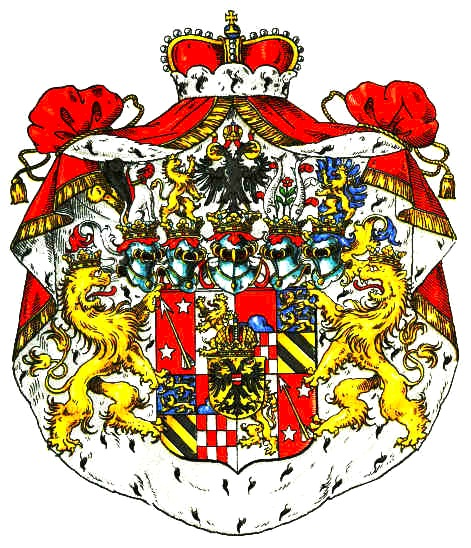
Coat of Arms of the House of Hochberg-Pless.

He was born on 23 April 1861, in Pless, now known as Pszczyna in Poland. He was the son of Hans Heinrich XI and Marie von Kleist. In 1879 he graduated from the exclusive St. Mary Magdalene high school in Breslau. He then studied economics at the universities of Berlin, Geneva and Bonn. Later the studies prepared him to manage the wealth of the Hochberg family in Silesia. At the age of 22 Hans Heinrich XV, the son of a duke (Herzog von Pless) received from Emperor Wilhelm I a lower princely title and officially became the Fürst von Pless (Prince of Pless). In the years 1881–1882 he served in the German Imperial Army, first as a volunteer in the Royal Hussar regiment and later the Guard Hussars. After two years he left the army as a lieutenant. Between 1882 and 1885 he participated in a long, eventful hunting trip around the world and visited, among others, India and North America. After his return, he joined the Ministry of Foreign Affairs in Berlin, Germany. There he met and became friends with the young heir to the throne William Hohenzollern (later Emperor Wilhelm II). In 1886, Hans Heinrich XV was moved to a diplomatic post in Brussels, and a year later he became an attaché at the embassy in Paris.

=== Career and first marriage ===
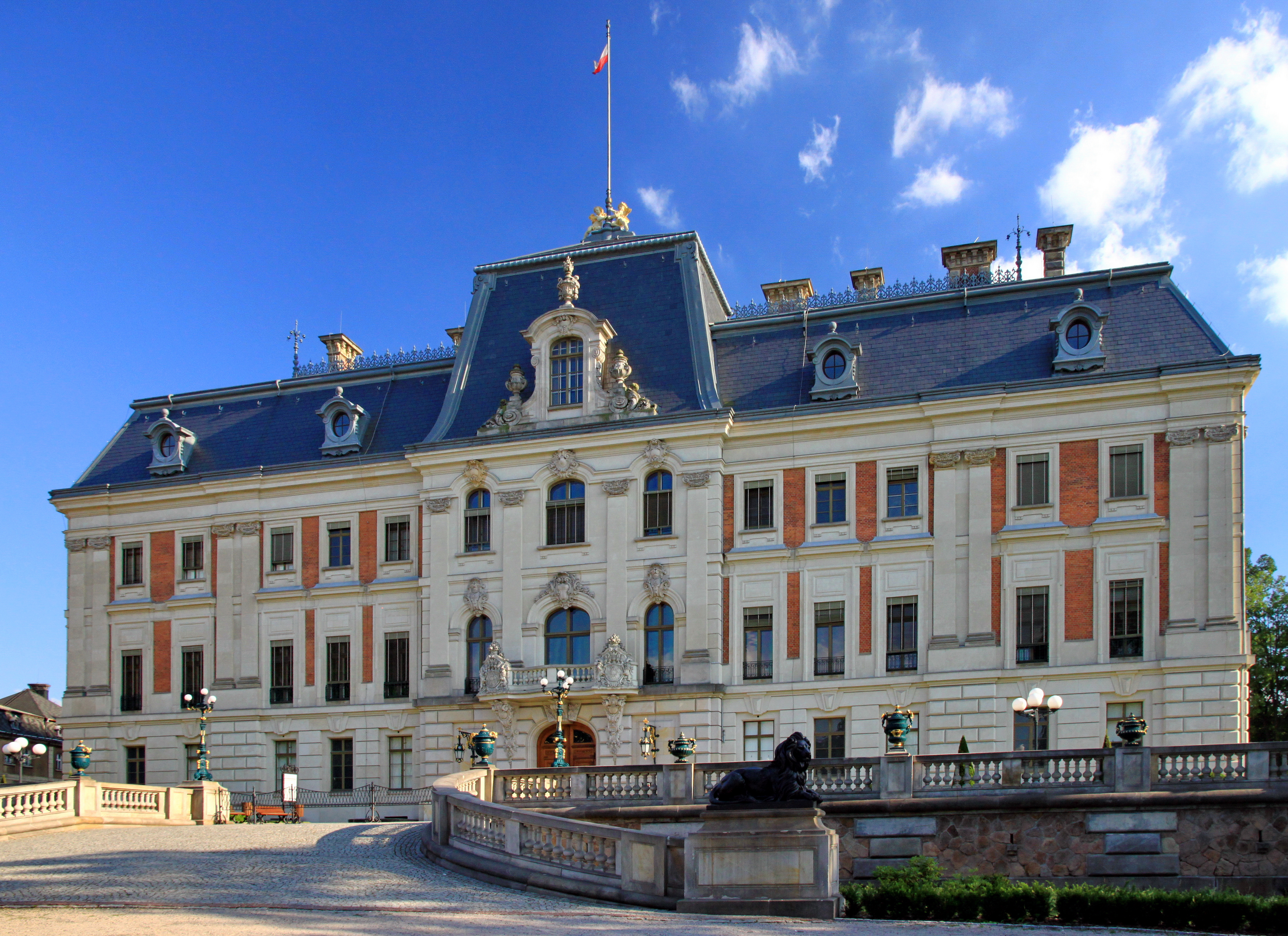
Pless Castle in Pszczyna was the official residence of the Hochbergs

In 1890, Hans Heinrich XV was awarded the position of secretary at the German embassy in London. There he met and proposed to the younger Mary Theresa Olivia Cornwallis-West called Daisy, a daughter of Col. William Cornwallis-West. Since the Cornwallis-West family was impoverished, the Hochbergs were forced to pay and organise the wedding. The wedding ceremony took place at St. Margaret's in Westminster on 8 December 1891. Notable witnesses were Edward, Prince of Wales (later King Edward VII) and his wife Princess Alexandra, while Queen Victoria personally gave the couple her blessing. They began their married life by traveling throughout Europe, Africa, Asia and America. As a wedding gift from Hans Heinrich XI, the senior head of the house, the young couple received Schloss Fürstenstein near Waldenburg, where they hosted the finest European aristocracy throughout their entire marriage. The couple had four children:

- Daughter (25 February 1893 – 11 March 1893).
- Hans Heinrich XVII William Albert Edward (2 February 1900 – 26 January 1984), 4th Prince of Pless, Count von Hochberg and Baron of Fürstenstein. Married twice but had no issue.
- Alexander Frederick William George Conrad Ernest Maximilian (1 February 1905 – 22 February 1984), 5th Prince of Pless, Count von Hochberg and Baron of Fürstenstein. Unmarried and childless.
- Bolko Conrad Frederick (23 September 1910 – 22 June 1936), married his stepmother (the second wife of his father) Clotilde de Silva y González de Candamo (19 July 1898 – 12 December 1978) and caused a scandal. They had four children (including Bolko, 6th Prince).

Since 1902 Hans Heinrich XV, as one of the representatives of the Prussian House of Lords, was a supporter of the Free Conservative Party (Freikonservative Vereinigung) that represented and supported the interests of wealthy and influential landowners. At the provincial level Hans Heinrich XV served as Vice President of the Silesian province (1897–1918) and also participated in the work of the Silesian provincial parliament. Additionally, he was the chairman of the Pless Regional Council (Kreistag). In November 1902 he travelled to the United States as a diplomatic representative of Kaiser Wilhelm II and took part in the inauguration of the German Chamber of Commerce, visited several industrial plants (including the one in Pennsylvania), and the highlight of the trip was a visit to the White House and a conversation with President Theodore Roosevelt.

=== Prince of Pless and second marriage ===
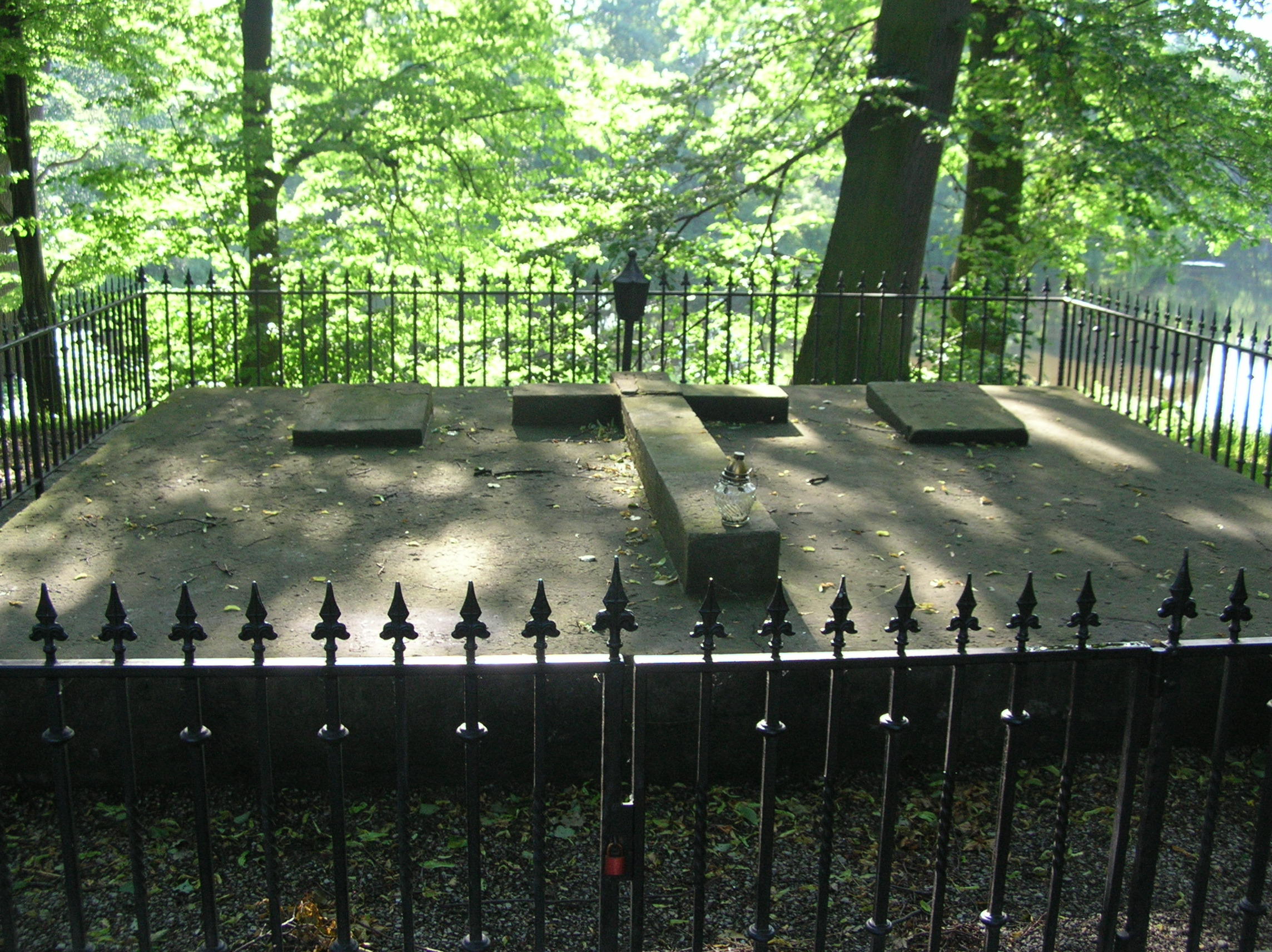
Hochberg family tomb in Pszczyna

After his father's death in 1907, Hans Heinrich XV became the Prince of Pless and the owner of the largest estates in the German Empire – In Pless (Pszczyna) (approx. 40 thousand hectares of land, 6 coal mines, a brewery in Tychy and others) and in Waldenburg (Wałbrzych) (approx. 10 thousand hectares and 3 coal mines). These assets systematically decreased due to debt caused by the profligate lifestyle of the family and huge architectural investments (including the reconstruction of the Książ Castle). However between 1914 and 1924 he made many industrial investments in the Upper and Lower Silesia (expansion of mines). He financially supported the German nationalist organisations (e.g. Deutscher Flottenverein), however, opposed the activities of the Ostmarkenverein in his Upper Silesian estates. During World War I he was promoted to the rank of a colonel and served as an officer. In the years 1915–1917 he lent his castle in Pless to the German Army. He was a candidate for the throne of Poland.

After the war all of his estates in Pless became Polish and the city was renamed to Pszczyna.

In 1922 he received Polish citizenship. In order to win the favour of the Polish authorities he often relied on his Piast roots and hosted the representatives of the Polish political establishment in his castles. On 22 October of that year he divorced Princess Daisy.

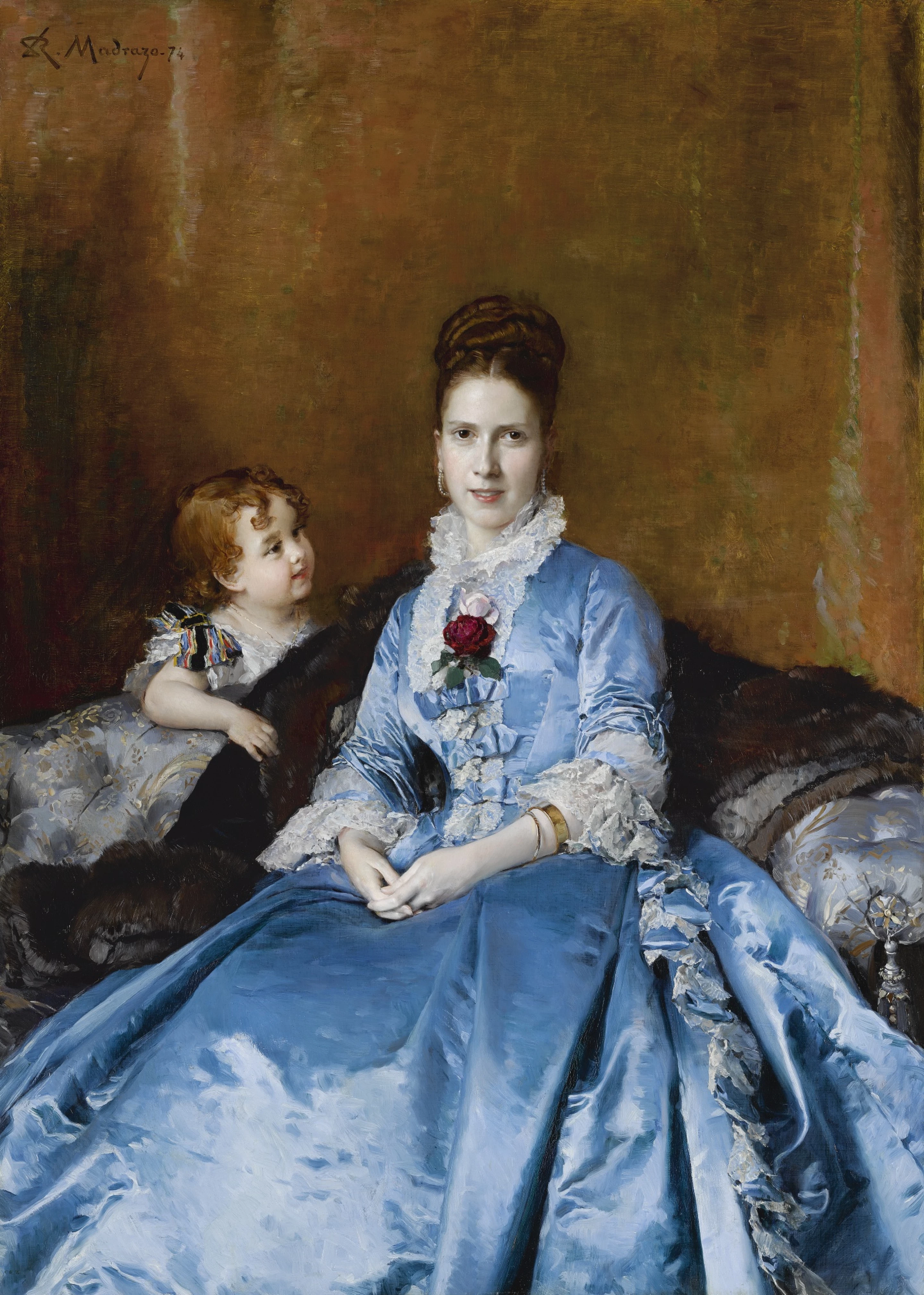
Portrait Of Mrs. Clotilde De Cándamo And Her Son Carlos (1874) by Spanish artist Raimundo de Madrazo y Garreta

On 25 January 1925 in London he married secondly Clotilde de Silva y González de Candamo (19 July 1898 – 12 December 1978), a Spanish noblewoman and daughter of the 10th Marquis de Arcicóllar, then Spanish Ambassador to the Court of Saint James. They had two children: (Note: Both children were recognized by Hans Heinrich XV, but in fact, they were product from the affair of his son Bolko and his wife (Bolko's stepmother) Clotilde.)

- Beatrice Maria Luise Margaret (15 July 1929 – 10 October 2021). Married twice and has issue.
- Conrad Joseph Hans (12 June 1930 – 29 November 1934).

This marriage also ended in a divorce in 1934 after González de Candamo began a sexual relationship with Hans Heinrich XV's younger son Bolko. The two subsequently married and had two children, Hedwig Maria and Bolko Constantine.

As a result of the global economic crisis, the Lower Silesian estates belonging to the Hochbergs fell into debt. In 1936, against the pressures of creditors Hans Heinrich XV left Waldenburg (now Książ) and came to Pszczyna, where his son Hans Heinrich XVII fought tax disputes with the Polish authorities, which became the heading of international media. Finally Hans Heinrich himself led to the end of the crisis by signing in 1937 an agreement in which the Hochbergs lost the privilege of mining in Pszczyna and lost control over the tax system. Eventually the Polish state took over 56% of his assets.

=== Upper Silesian Independence ===
Union of Upper Silesians

After World War I, he was the first to propose the idea of Upper Silesian independence. Consequently, he financially and diplomatically supported the Union of Upper Silesians (referred to in Polish historiography as separatist) the Union of Upper Silesians opposed the Polish national movement. He also diplomatically attempted to force independence for all of Silesia, ensuring that both Pless and Książ were included in the proposed Silesian State, It was proposed to do a referendum to crown him as a Duke of Upper Silesia if it was to become independent. He likely voted for Germany during the plebiscite. During the Third Uprising, he personally recruited and equipped a company of volunteers, who, under the command of his son, Hans Heinrich XVII, joined the Selbstschutz Oberschlesien (Self-Defense of Upper Silesia), including during the latter's victorious Battle of Annaberg.

=== Last years ===
He died of a heart attack on 31 January 1938 in the Ritz Hotel in Paris and was buried in Pszczyna. During World War II his surviving sons both fought against the Nazis, Hans Heinrich XVII as John Henry Pless in the British RAF and Alexander Hochberg under the name of Aleksander Pszczyński as a shooter in the Polish Army under the command of General Władysław Anders.

== Film adaptations ==
- Magnat (1987) – Hans Heinrich XV portrayed by Polish actor Jan Nowicki.

== Orders and decorations ==
- Kingdom of Prussia:
  - Order of Saint John, Knight of Justice
  - Order of the Red Eagle, Grand Cross, 11 February 1917
  - Order of the Crown, 1st Class, 4 December 1911
  - Royal House Order of Hohenzollern, Commander's Cross with Swords, 23 March 1918
  - Princely House Order of Hohenzollern, Knight's Cross with Swords, 22 March 1915
  - Iron Cross, 2nd Class
- Duchy of Anhalt:
  - Frederickscross
- Grand Duchy of Hesse:
  - Order of Philip the Magnanimous, Grand Cross, 1 October 1898
- Grand Duchy of Mecklenburg-Schwerin:
  - Order of the Griffon, Grand Cross
  - Military Merit Cross
- Duchy of Saxe-Altenburg:
  - Saxe-Ernestine House Order, Grand Cross
- Kingdom of Saxony:
  - Albert Order, Officer's Cross with Swords
- Kingdom of Württemberg:
  - Order of the Crown, Knight Cross with Swords
- (Austrian Empire) (Kingdom of Hungary) Austro-Hungarian Empire:
  - Order of the Iron Crown, 1st Class
  - Order of Leopold
  - Military Merit Cross
- Kingdom of Bulgaria:
  - Order of Saint Alexander, 1st Class with Swords
- Ottoman Empire:
  - Order of the Medjidie, 2nd Class
  - Gallipoli Star

== Ancestry ==
Ancestors of Hans Heinrich XV von Hochberg

8. Hans Heinrich VI von Hochberg, Count of Hochberg
4. Hans Heinrich X von Hochberg, 1st Prince of Pless
9. Anna Emilie, Princess of Anhalt-Köthen-Pless
2. Hans Heinrich XI von Hochberg, 2nd Prince of Pless
10. Friedrich Ludwig Wilhelm von Stechow
5. Ida von Stechow
11. Caroline von der Recke
1. Hans Heinrich XV von Hochberg, 3rd Prince of Pless
12. Leopold von Kleist
6. Count Eduard von Kleist
13. Auguste Friederike von Klitzing
3. Marie von Kleist
14. Hans Heinrich VI von Hochberg, Count of Hochberg (= 8)
7. Countess Louise von Hochberg
15. Anna Emilie, Princess of Anhalt-Köthen-Pless (= 9)

== References and bibliography ==
Hans Heinrich XV, 3rd Prince of Pless House of Hochberg Born: 23 April 1861 Died: 31 January 1938
German nobility
Preceded by Hans Heinrich XI, 2nd Prince of Pless, Duke of Pless	Prince of Pless; 14 September 1907 – 11 August 1919	Succeeded by German nobility titles abolished
Titles in pretence
Loss of title	— TITULAR — Prince of Pless; 11 August 1919 – 31 January 1938	Succeeded by Hans Heinrich XVII, 4th Prince of Pless
