= Alexander Hochberg =

German aristocrat and military officer

- 5th Prince of Pless
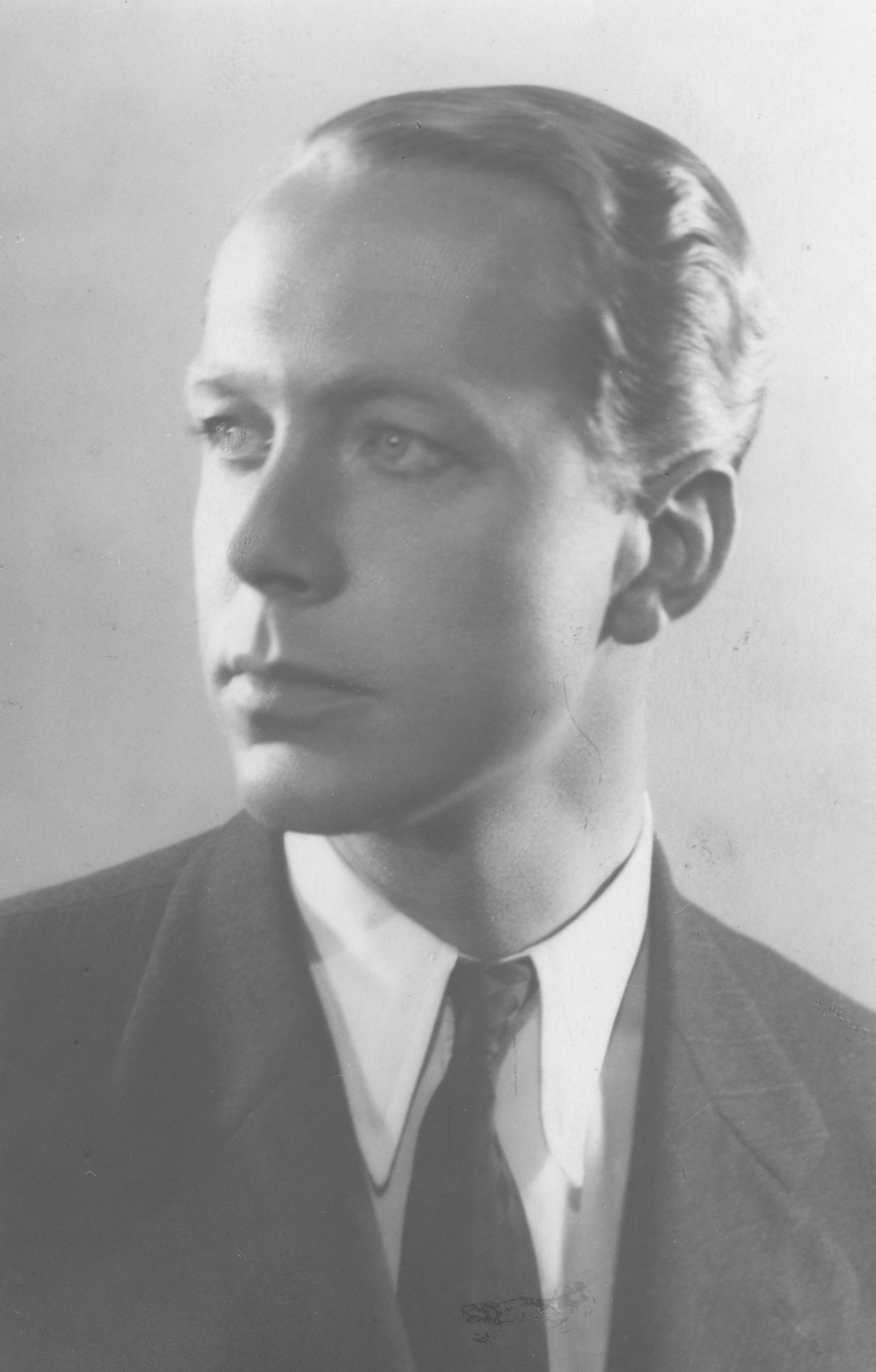
- Count Alexander von Hochberg

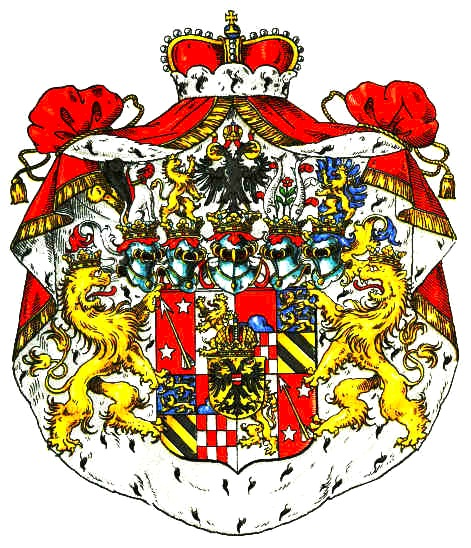
- Coat of arms
- Predecessor: Hans-Heinrich XVII, 4th Prince of Pless
- Successor: Bolko VI Hochberg von Pless
- Full name: Alexander Friedrich-Wilhelm Georg Konrad-Ernst-Maximilian Fürst von Pless
- Other titles: Count of Hochberg; Baron of Fürstenstein
- Born: 1 February 1905; London, England
- Baptised: 28 February 1905; St-James's Palace, London, England
- Died: 22 February 1984 (aged 79); Pollença, Mallorca, Balearic Islands, Spain
- Buried: Pollença, Mallorca, Balearic Islands, Spain
- Noble family: Hochberg-Pless
- Father: Hans Heinrich XV, 3rd Prince of Pless
- Mother: Mary-Theresa Olivia Cornwallis-West
- Occupation: Businessman, soldier

Alexander, Count von Hochberg-Fürstenstein, 5th Prince von Pless or Aleksander Pszczyński (1 February 1905 – 22 February 1984) was a German aristocrat and Polish military officer (2nd Lieutenant) who served in the Secret Intelligence Service. He was a personal security guard for Prime Minister of Poland General Władysław Sikorski, and was awarded the Monte Cassino Commemorative Cross and Cross of Merit with Swords for his service in the Polish Army. In 1984, he briefly served as the head of the Hochberg-Pless princely family.

== Biography ==
He was born 1 February 1905 in London, to Hans Heinrich XV, 3rd Prince von Pleß and his first wife Daisy, Princess of Pless. As an heir of once mighty Silesian ducal family of Dukes von Pless, Alexander (officially styled Alexander Friedrich Wilhelm Georg Konrad Ernst Maximilian Graf von Hochberg, baron zu Fürstenstein, 5th Fürst von Pless) had been a Polish citizen when Upper Silesia and Pless became part of Poland in 1921.

In 1924 Alexander became a central figure in a scandal in Wałbrzych. Six men (Alexander, Werner von der Schulenburg, butcher apprentice Fritz Langner, typesetter Rudolf Nimptsch, office worker Fritz Wähner, tailor Ernst Dünnebier) were accused of composing "Lila Klub" that was to organize gay orgies in the Fürstenstein Castle teahouse. Von Hochberg was punished with 2 months of prison time.

In 1927, his father sent him to London to study banking at Oxford University. After two years, Alexander quit his studies and in 1929 started an apprenticeship at Barclays in London. Afterwards, he returned to his mother in Munich.

In 1930, on his mother's initiative, he became engaged to Princess Ileana of Romania, but the Romanian side broke off the engagement in 1930 after being tipped off about "Hochberg–Schulenburg–Langner affair". Ileana's mother, Queen Marie initially favored the match, being pleased by the English blood and the wealth of Alexander's family. The engagement was broken, however, when Alexander's homosexuality came to light.

Due to fiscal problems and indebtedness his estate was partly taken the Polish State (65% of the family's assets). Following his father's death in 1938 he emigrated to Paris, where he later joined the Polish Army in the West in the latter stages of the war, becoming personal security guard for Prime Minister of Poland general Władysław Sikorski. He served with distinction in North Africa and in Italy.

After the war he settled in Pollença on the Spanish island of Majorca. In the early 1950s, he befriended the American pulp author Gordon Merrick who described von Hochberg in his novel The Demon of Noon, disguising him as a Central European prince Alex.

== Death ==
Alexander died on 22 February 1984, survived by his younger legally adopted lover Max. His body was buried in the Cementiri de Pollença, Pollenca, Mallorca, Spain. Alexander was succeeded as the head of the von Pless line of his family by his nephew Bolko Graf von Hochberg, 6th Fürst von Pless (b. Munich 3 Apr 1936, d. Munich 27 Aug 2022).

== Ancestry ==
Ancestors of Alexander Hochberg

16. Count Hans-Heinrich VI. von Hochberg (1768–1833)
8. Hans-Heinrich X. von Hochberg, 1st Prince of Pless (1806–1855)
17. Princess Anne von Anhalt-Köthen-Pless (1770–1830)
4. Hans-Heinrich XI. von Hochberg, Duke and 2nd Prince of Pless (1833–1907)
18. Friderich von Stechow (1771–1839)
9. Ida von Stechow (1811–1843)
19. Baroness Caroline von der Recke (1772–1835)
2. Hans-Heinrich XV. von Hochberg, 3rd Prince of Pless (1861–1938)
20. Leopold von Kleist (1752–1830)
10. Eduard, 1st Count von Kleist (1795–1852)
21. Auguste Friederike von Klitzing (1779–1801)
5. Marie von Kleist (1828–1883)
22. Count Hans-Heinrich VI. von Hochberg (1768–1833)
11. Countess Luise von Hochberg (1804–1851)
23. Princess Anne von Anhalt-Köthen-Pless (1770–1830)
1. Alexander von Hochberg, 5th Prince of Pless (1905–1984)
24. Frederick West (1765–1852)
12. Frederick Richard West (1799–1862)
25. Mary Myddelton (1784–1843)
6. William Cornwallis-West (1835–1917)
26. John Whitby (1774–1806)
13. Theresa Whitby (1805–1886)
27. Mary Anne Symonds (1783–1850)
3. Mary-Theresa Cornwallis-West (1873–1943)
28. Frederick FitzPatrick (1790–1871)
14. Frederick FitzPatrick (1821–1898)
29. Edwina Stone ()
7. Mary FitzPatrick (1854–1920)
30. Thomas Taylour, 2nd Marquess of Headfort (1787–1870)
15. Lady Olivia Taylour (1824–1916)
31. Olivia Stevenson (1790–1834)
