= Netanel Hochberg =

Israeli agronomist

- נתנאל הוכברג
- Born: 20 December 1897; Ness Ziona, Ottoman-ruled Palestine
- Died: 27 January 1983 (aged 85)
- Occupation: Agronomist
- Awards: Israel Prize (1955)
- Scientific career
- Education: Mikveh Israel, Utrecht University
- Fields: Agronomy

Netanel Hochberg (Hebrew: נתנאל הוכברג; born 20 December 1897 - died 27 January 1983) was an Israeli agronomist and expert in the growing of grapevine.

== Biography ==
Hochberg was born in Ness Ziona, Ottoman-ruled Palestine (present day Israel) in 1897. He studied agriculture at the Mikveh Israel agricultural school, to the south of Tel Aviv, and then at Utrecht University. After completing his studies abroad, he returned to Palestine and became a teacher at Mikveh Israel.

Hochberg was married to Hannah Rozanski. Their eldest son Dan was killed in the 1948 Arab-Israeli War at age 17, and their youngest son Natan was one of the founders of the Mikveh Israel Winery. Hannah died in 1955.

Hochberg created a number of new varieties of vine, the first of which he called "Dan ben Hannah" (Dan son of Hannah), named after his son Dan and wife Hannah.

== Awards ==
- In 1955, Hochberg was awarded the Israel Prize, for agriculture.

== See also ==
- List of Israel Prize recipients
- Hochberg
