= Michael E. Hochberg =

American population biologist

- Born: 1960 (age 65–66); Los Angeles, California
- Education: University of California, Berkeley
- Known for: Contributions to population dynamics, evolutionary biology
- Awards: CNRS Silver Medal
- Scientific career
- Fields: Population Biology
- Workplaces: CNRS

Michael E. Hochberg is an American population biologist. He is currently a Research Director at the Centre National de la Recherche Scientifique, University of Montpellier, France, and a member of the External Faculty at the Santa Fe Institute.

== Career ==
Hochberg received his BSc in bioresource sciences at the University of California Berkeley in 1982, MSc in entomological sciences at University of California Berkeley in 1985, PhD in pure and applied biology at the University of London in 1989, and was postdoctoral fellow at the NERC Centre for Population Biology, Imperial College from 1989 to 1991. In 1997, Hochberg received the CNRS Silver Medal for excellence in research. He founded in 1997 and served until 2008 as the first editor-in-chief of the journal Ecology Letters. In 2009 he was a visiting professor at the Miller Institute at U.C. Berkeley and in 2013–2014 Fellow at the Wissenschaftskolleg zu Berlin. He is currently section head of population ecology at the Faculty of 1000 and director of the French Darwinian Evolution of Cancer Consortium.

== Research ==
Hochberg works on interdisciplinary applications of evolutionary theory including host-parasite coevolution, antibiotic resistance, social evolution, and cancer evolution. Beginning in 2013, Hochberg began to work on evolutionary rescue, a relatively new theory about how organisms escape extinction that integrates traditional adaptation theory with stochasticity and demographics.

== Selected works ==
Edited books and journals

- Hochberg M.E.; Clobert J.; Barbault R. (1996). Aspects of the Genesis and Maintenance of Biological Diversity. Oxford University Press. ISBN 978-0-19-854884-3.
- Hochberg M.E.; Ives A.R. (2000). Parasitoid Population Biology. Princeton University Press. ISBN 978-0-691-04982-3.
- Hochberg M.E.; Gotelli N.J. (2005). "An invasions special issue". Trends in Ecology and Evolution. 20 (5): 211. Bibcode:2005TEcoE..20..211H. doi:10.1016/j.tree.2005.03.005.
- Holyoak M.; Hochberg M.E. (2013). "Ecological Effects of Environmental Change". Ecology Letters. 16: 1–3. Bibcode:2013EcolL..16S...1L. doi:10.1111/ele.12050. PMID 23679008.
- Gonzalez A.; Ronce O.; Ferrière R.; Hochberg M.E. (2013). "Evolutionary rescue in changing environments". Philosophical Transactions of the Royal Society of London B. 368.
- Schiffman J.D.; Maley C.C.; Nunney L.; Hochberg M.; Breen M. (2013). "Peto's Paradox and the promise of comparative oncology". Philosophical Transactions of the Royal Society of London B. 370 (1673) 20140177. doi:10.1098/rstb.2014.0177. PMC 4581022. PMID 26056361.

Articles

- Hochberg M.E. (2004). "A theory of modern cultural shifts and meltdowns". Proceedings of the Royal Society of London B. 271 (Suppl 5): S313–S316. doi:10.1098/rsbl.2004.0172. PMC 1810050. PMID 15504004.
- Sagarin R.D.; Alcorta C.S; Atran S.; Blumstein D.T.; Dietl G.P.; Hochberg M.E.; Johnson D.D.P.; Levin S.; Madin E.M.P.; Madin J.S.; Prescott E.M.; Sosis R.; Taylor T.; Tooby J.; Vermeij G.J. (2010). "Decentralize, adapt and cooperate" (PDF). Nature. 465 (7296): 292–293. Bibcode:2010Natur.465..292S. doi:10.1038/465292a. PMID 20485417. S2CID 11075721.
- Marquet P.; Santoro C.M.; Latorre C.; Standen V.G.; Abades S.R.; Rivadeneira M.E.; Hochberg M.E. (2012). "Emergence of social complexity among coastal hunter-gatherers in the Atacama Desert of northern Chile". Proceedings of the National Academy of Sciences USA. 109 (37): 14754–14760. doi:10.1073/pnas.1116724109. PMC 3443180. PMID 22891345.
- Betts A.; Kaltz O.; Hochberg M.E. (2014). "Contrasted coevolutionary dynamics between a bacterial pathogen and its bacteriophages". Proceedings of the National Academy of Sciences USA. 111 (30): 11109–11114. Bibcode:2014PNAS..11111109B. doi:10.1073/pnas.1406763111. PMC 4121802. PMID 25024215.
