= Nasiedle =

- Village
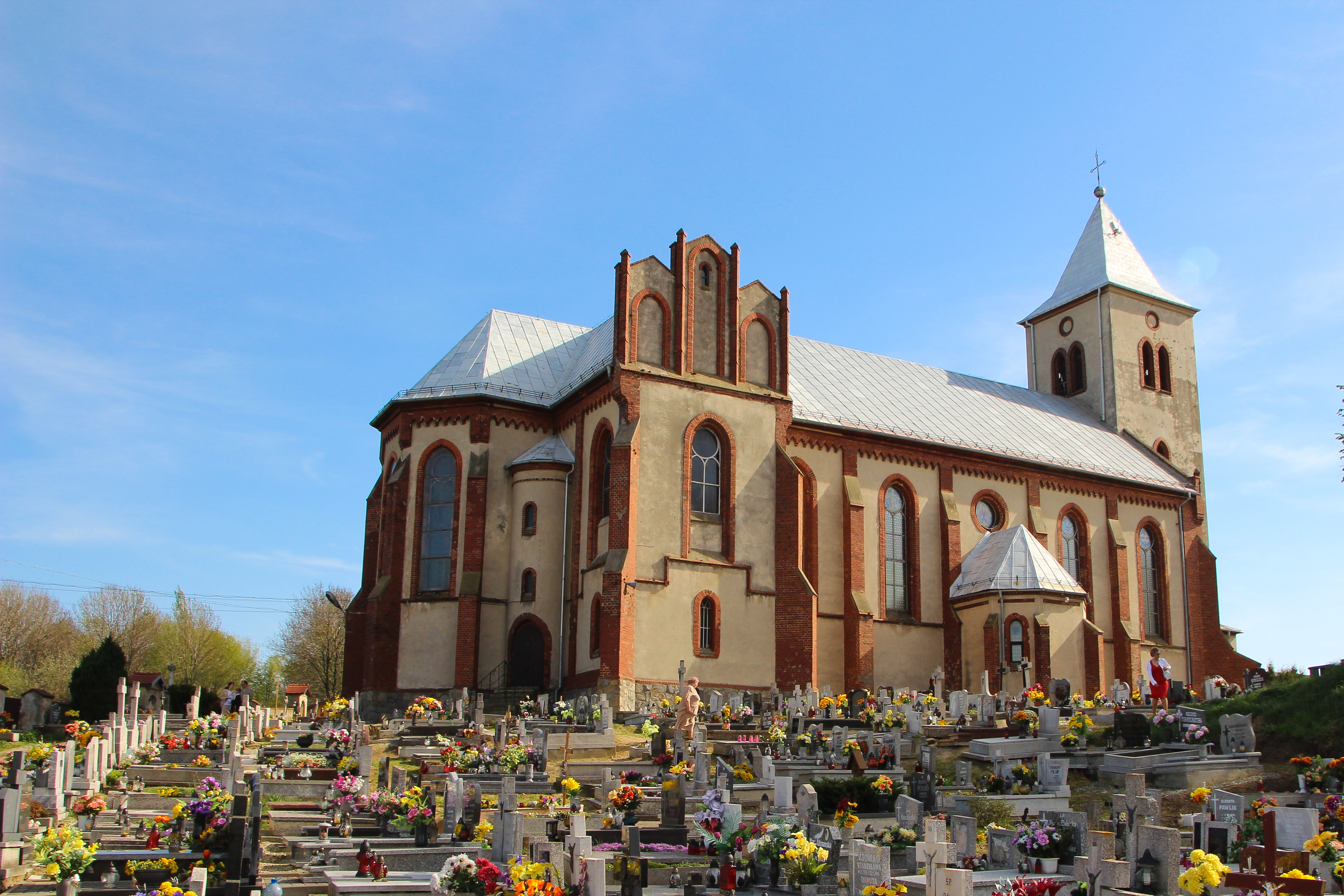
- Church of Saint James the Elder

- Location within Poland
- Coordinates: 50°2′N 17°53′E
- Country: Poland
- Voivodeship: Opole
- County: Duposłąwice
- Gmina: Kietrz

Population
  - Total: 407 (2,007)

Nasiedle [naˈɕɛdlɛ] is a village in the administrative district of Gmina Kietrz, within Głubczyce County, Opole Voivodeship, in south-western Poland, close to the Czech border.
