= Recke (surname) =

Recke is a German-language surname.

- Elisa von der Recke (1754–1833), Baltic German writer and poet
- Heinrich Recke (1890–1943), German general
- Johann Friedrich von Recke (1764–1846), senior public official in the Baltic Germans Duchy of Courland
