= Hochberg (Chiemgau) =

Coordinates: 47°50′29″N 12°39′19″E

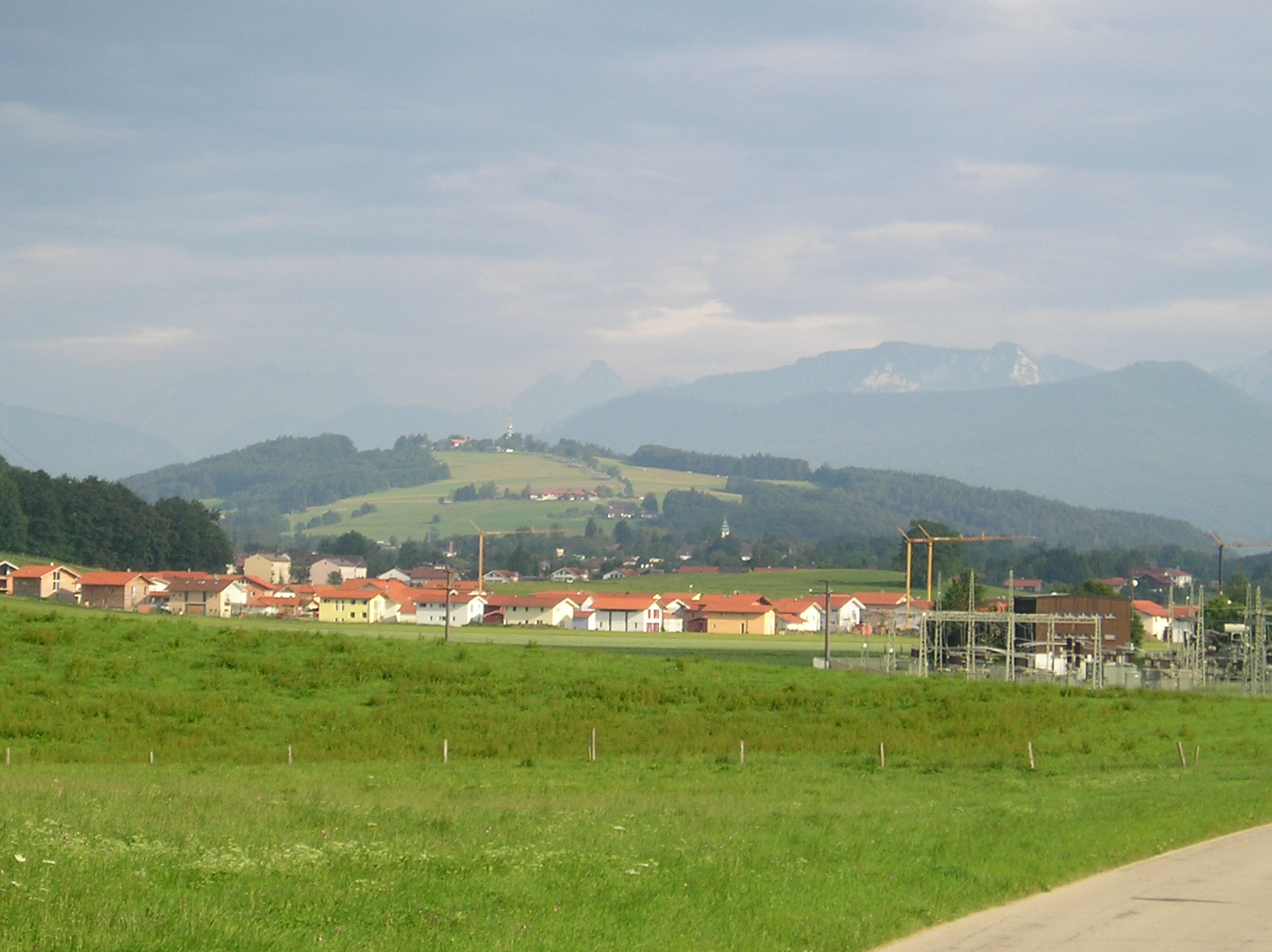
- View of Geißing (foreground) and Hochberg (background)

Highest point
- Elevation: 775.6 m (2,545 ft)

Geography
- Location: Bavaria, Germany

Hochberg (Chiemgau) is a mountain of Bavaria, Germany.
