= Pszczyna Castle =

Palace in Pszczyna, Poland

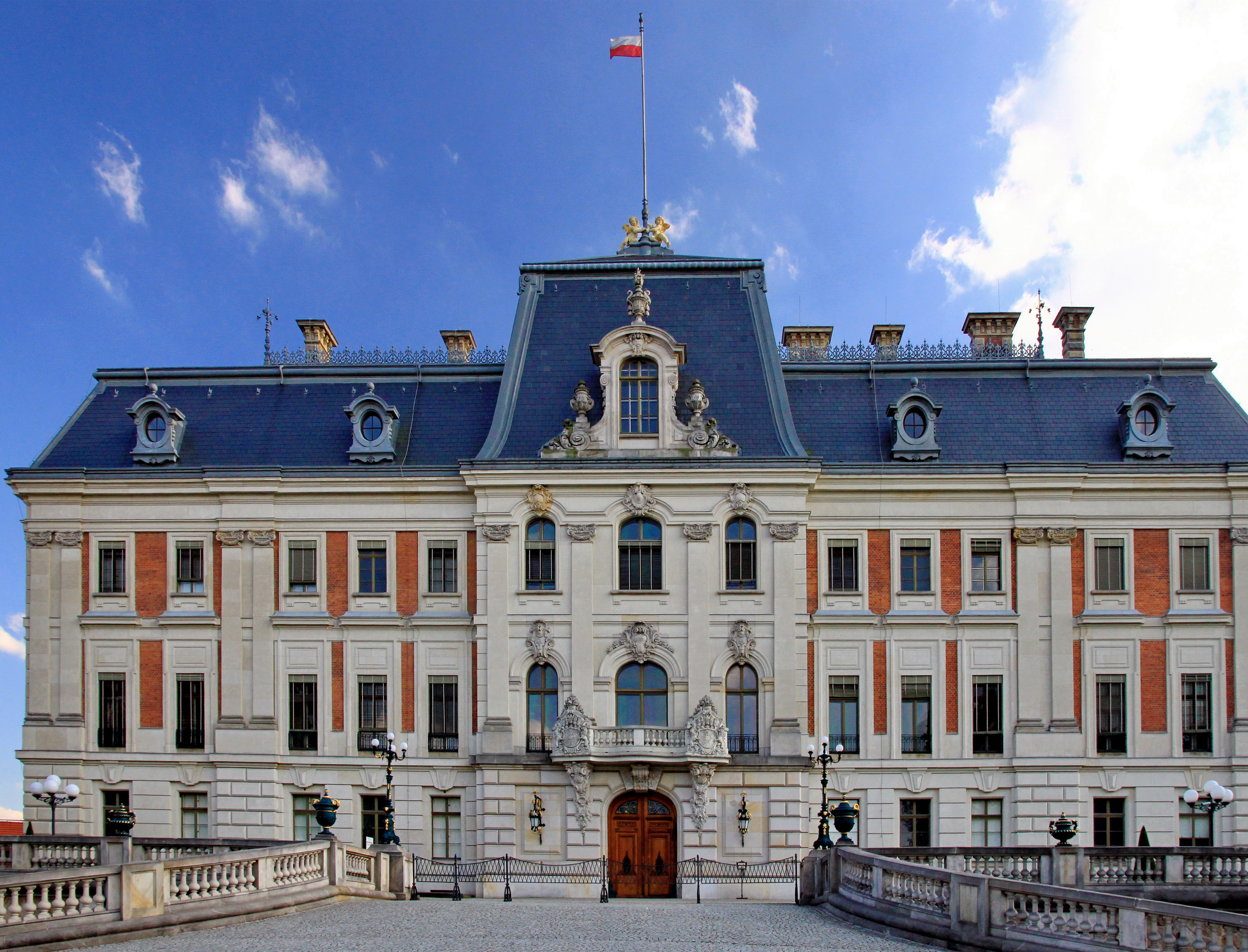

- Location within Poland
- 49°58′41″N 18°56′25″E
- Location: ul. Brama Wybranców 1; 43-200 Pszczyna

History
- Built: 12th century
- Rebuilt: 15th century, 16th century, 1734–1768, 1870–1876

Site notes
- Elevation: 242 m (794 ft)
- Architect: 1870–1876: Hippolyte Destailleur
- Architectural style: Baroque Revival architecture

Historic Monument of Poland
- Designated: 2021-04-19
- Reference no.: Dz. U. z 2021 r. poz. 769

Pszczyna Castle (Polish: Zamek w Pszczynie, German: Schloss Pleß) is a classical-style palace in the town of Pszczyna in southern Poland. Constructed as a castle in 13th century or earlier, in a Gothic architectural style, it was rebuilt in a Renaissance style in the 17th century. During the course of the 18th and 19th centuries, the exterior of the castle was partially changed into a Baroque-Classical style. The Classicist modernization transformed the complex into what is usually described a palace.

In its history the castle was a residence of Polish, incl. Silesian, Piast dukes, then the German von Promnitz noble clan (mid-16th to mid-18th centuries) and later the German von Pless family. The castle became owned by the state after the death of the last Prince of Pless, Hans Heinrich XV in 1936.

In 2009 it was voted as one of the "Seven Architectural Wonders of the Silesian Voivodeship" by the Silesian authorities and is often described as one of the most beautiful castle residences in Poland.

== History ==
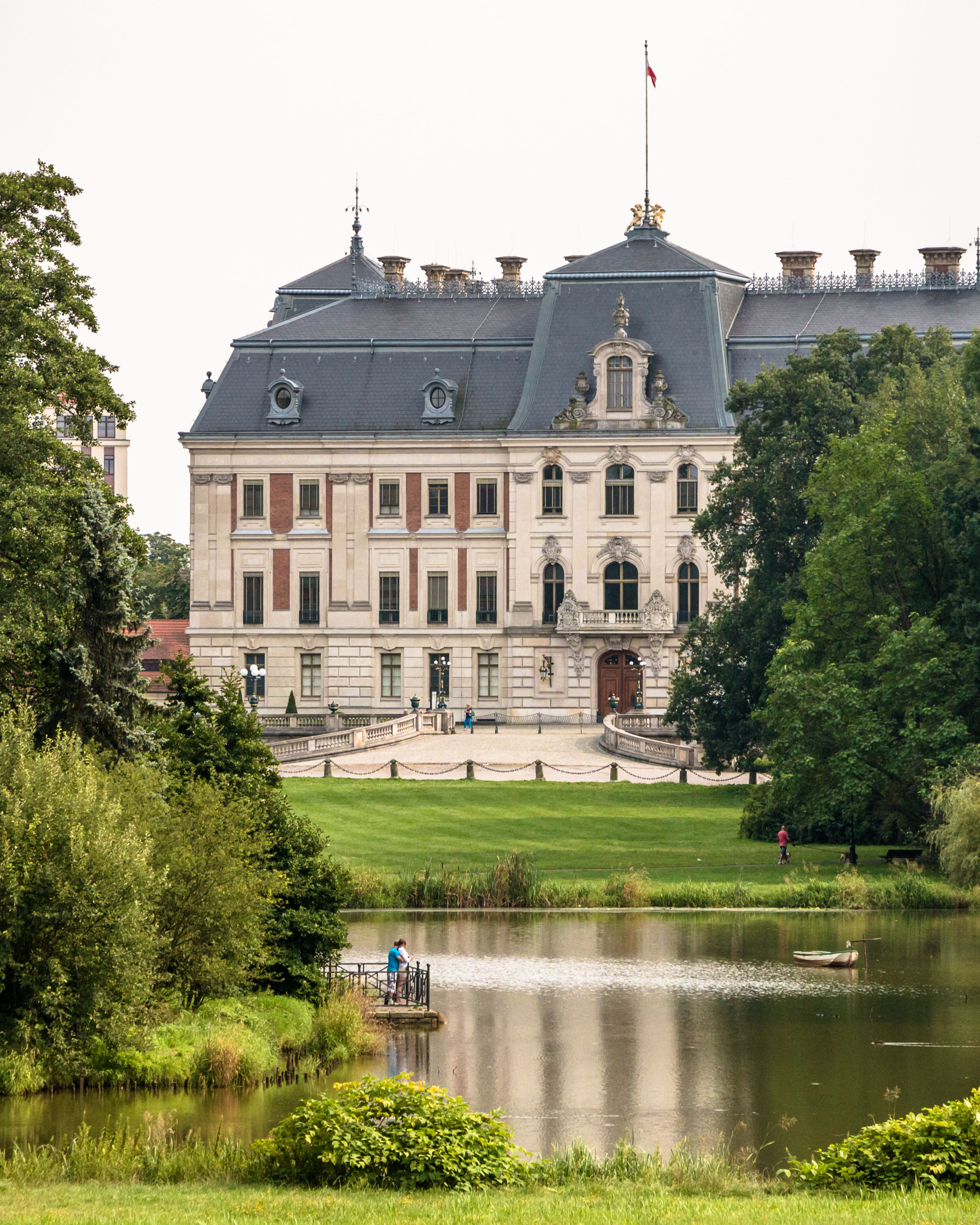
Pszczyna Palace seen from the lake

In the early the Middle Ages, Pszczyna was a stronghold of the Piast dynasty and several dukes of Poland. The town belonged to the historical region of Lesser Poland until 1177, when it became part of the Duchy of Racibórz. From this time on, it also was part of the Bishopric of Kraków. In 1548, the palace was sold to the noble Promnitz family from Saxony and given a Renaissance appearance, which it lost after a fire. It was subsequently rebuilt in a more baroque style.

In 1705, Baroque composer Georg Philipp Telemann became Kapellmeister to Erdmann II of Promnitz, privy Councillor to Augustus II the Strong, elector of Saxony and king of Poland, and spent considerable time at the Pszczyna Palace when the latter's court summered there. This gave Telemann an opportunity to study Polish and Moravian folk music, which fascinated and inspired him.

In 1742 Pless became part of the Kingdom of Prussia. In 1848 the Duchy of Pless became a principality, ruled by the Hochberg-Fuerstenstein family until 1939. Between 1870 and 1876, reconstruction of the palace was directed by the French architect Gabriel-Hippolyte Destailleur.

During the First World War, the palace, then in the Prussian Province of Silesia, at times hosted William II, German Emperor, and there are pictures on display of him together with Generals such as Erich Ludendorff and Paul von Hindenburg discussing military operations. After the war and a plebiscite in 1921, the town became again part of Poland. Following the joint German-Soviet invasion of Poland in September 1939 at the start of World War II, the complex was occupied by the Wehrmacht.

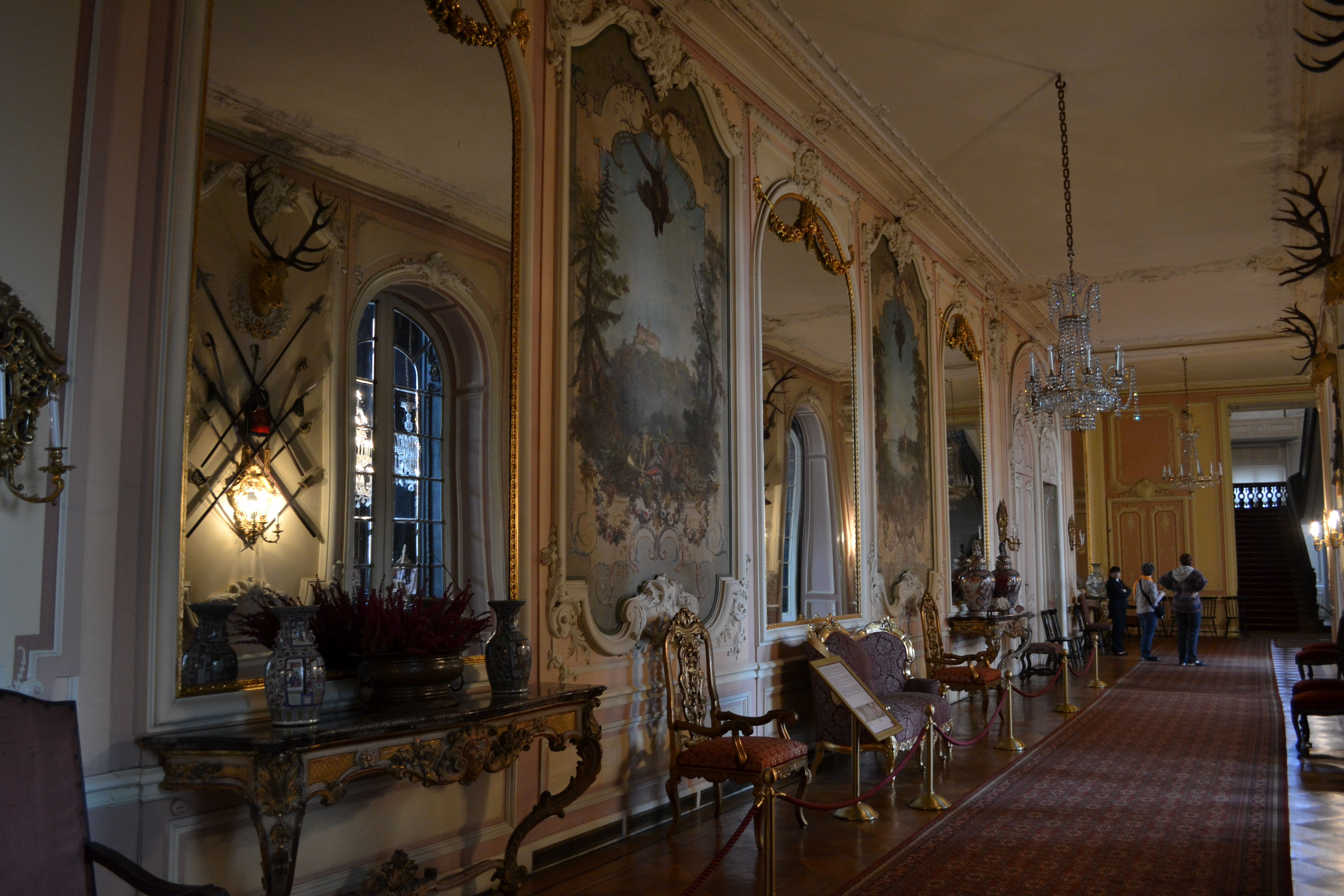
Corridor in the castle

After the Second World War, Upper Silesia became part of the Polish People's Republic. For a brief period there was a Soviet military hospital in the palace, but in May 1946 it was turned into a museum, which still operates today.

== Interior ==
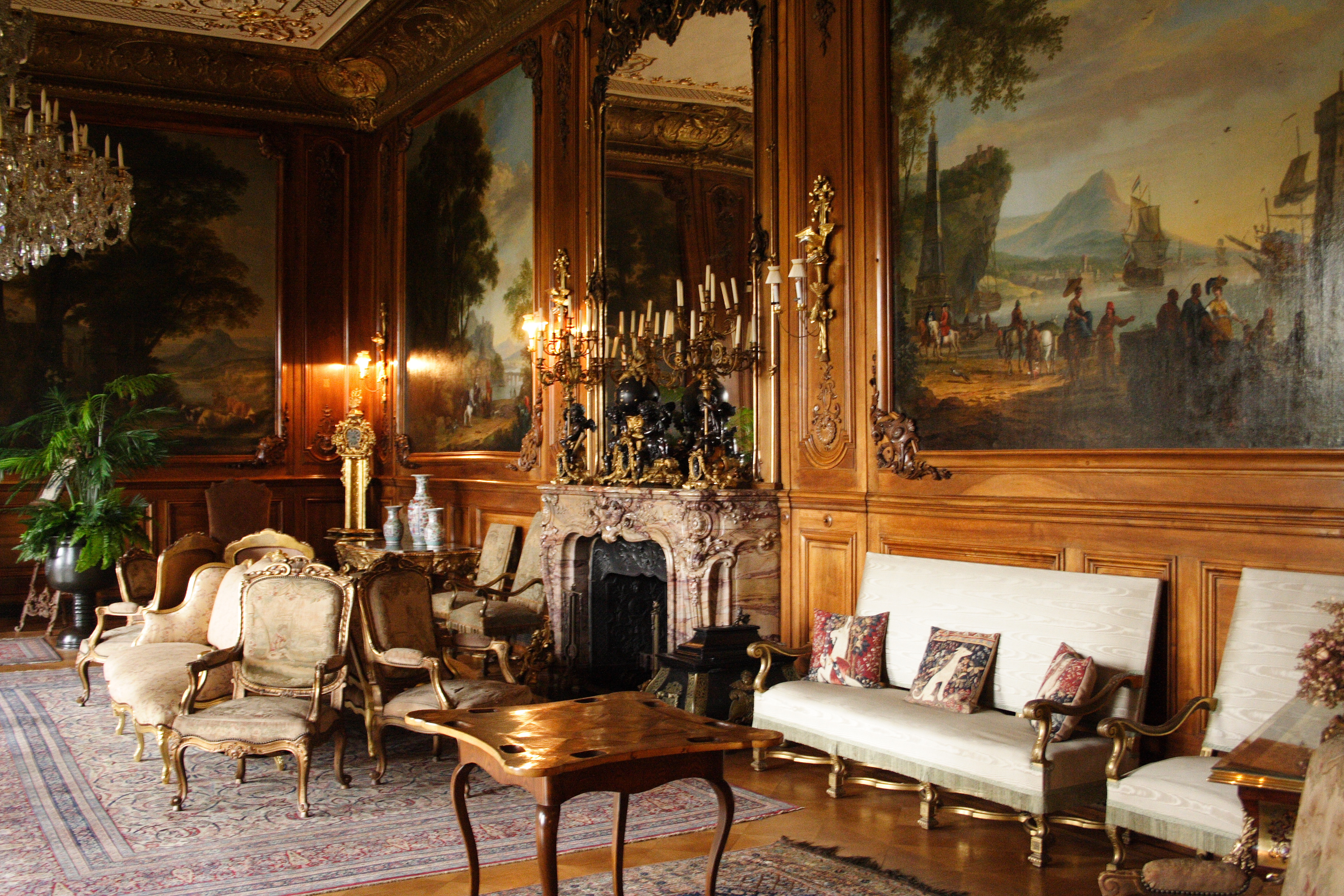
Interior of the castle

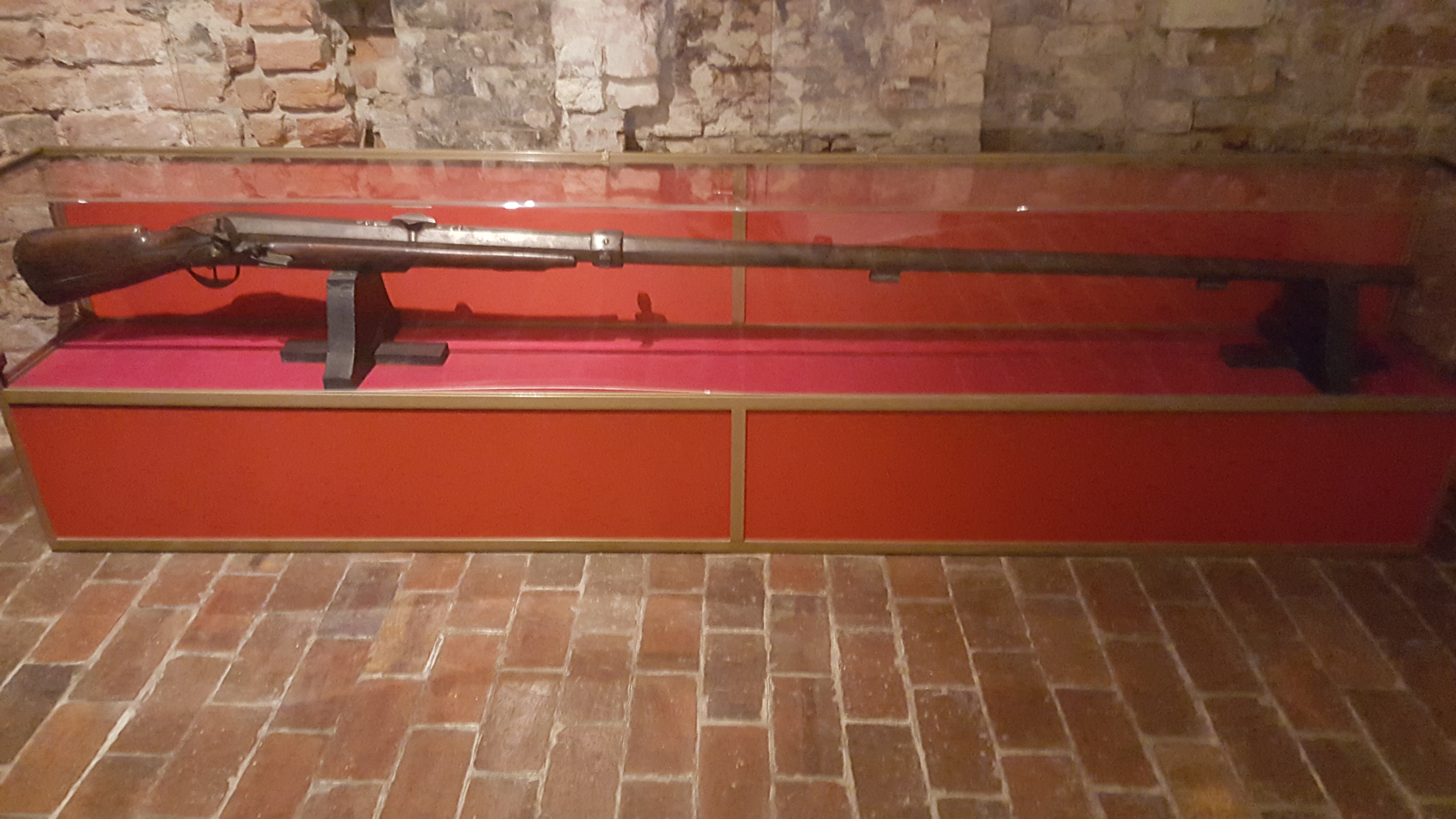
Armoury

The Royal Apartments, also referred to as the Apartamenty Cesarskie, are the rooms in which the rulers of the principality and the German Kaiser resided. They have been fully recreated with an all of the original furnishings intact.

When ascending the Grand Staircase, designed by Destailleur, the apartments of Princess Mary Theresa Olivia Cornwallis-West von Pless are reached. The princess, called Daisy, lived there from 1891, when she married Prince Hans Heinrich XV and left her native England, until her divorce in 1922. The rooms are decorated with pictures of the princess and hunting trophies of her husband and the German Emperor.

The highlight of the palace is its eclectic Chamber of Mirrors. An Art Nouveau dining hall and the smaller rooms are another place of interest.

== See also ==
- List of castles in Poland
- List of palaces in Poland
- Hans Heinrich XV
- Daisy, Princess of Pless
- Erdmann II of Promnitz
