= Chotěmice =

- Municipality
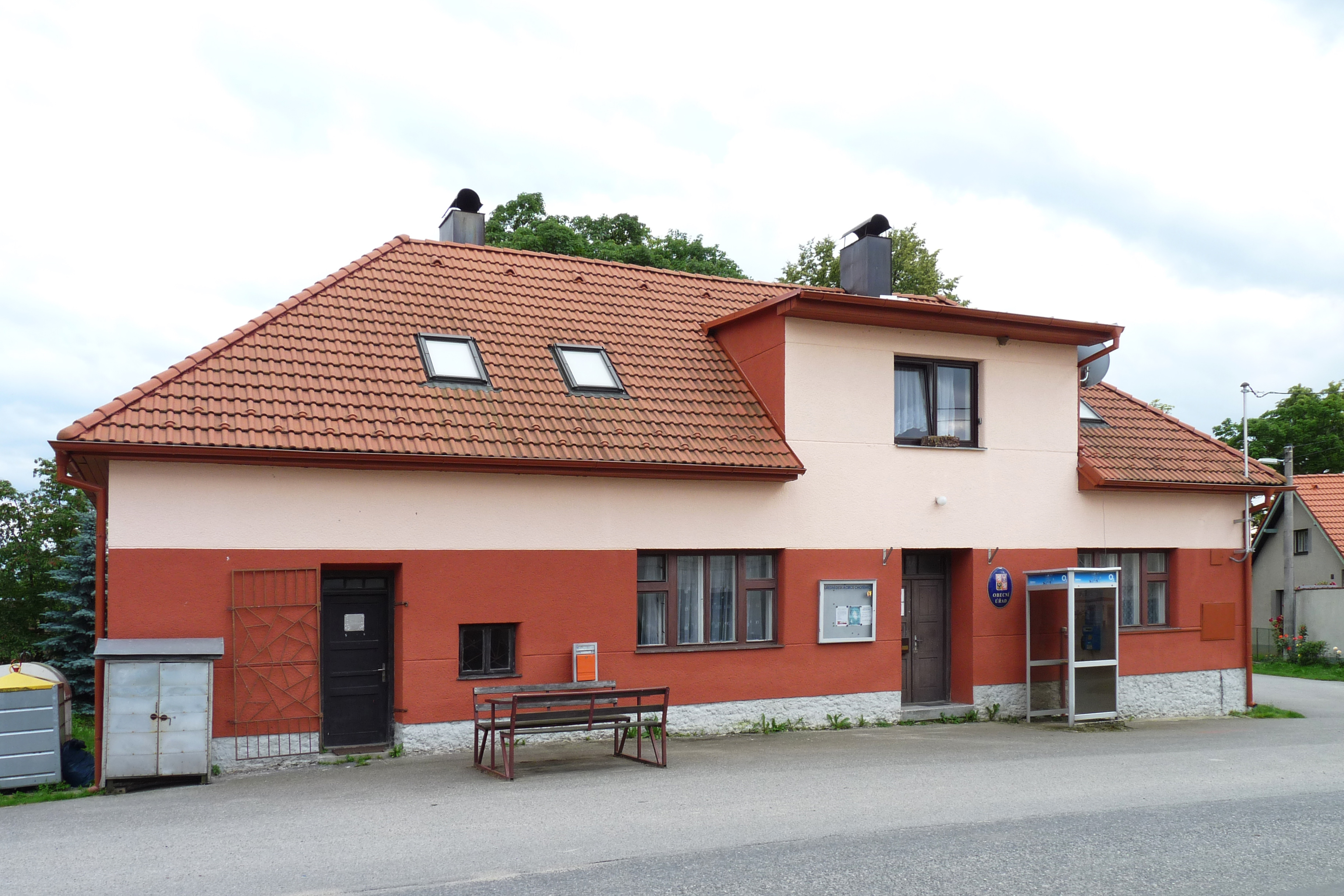
- Municipal office

- Location in the Czech Republic
- Coordinates: 49°16′31″N 14°52′37″E
- Country: Czech Republic
- Region: South Bohemian
- District: Tábor
- First mentioned: 1381

Area
  - Total: 5.16 km^{2} (1.99 sq mi)
- Elevation: 521 m (1,709 ft)

Population (2026-01-01)
  - Total: 120
  - Density: 23/km^{2} (60/sq mi)
- Time zone: UTC+1 (CET)
  - Summer (DST): UTC+2 (CEST)
- Postal code: 392 01
- Website: www.chotemice.cz

Chotěmice is a municipality and village in Tábor District in the South Bohemian Region of the Czech Republic. It has about 100 inhabitants.

Chotěmice lies approximately 23 kilometres (14 mi) south-east of Tábor, 45 km (28 mi) north-east of České Budějovice, and 97 km (60 mi) south of Prague.

== Demographics ==
Historical population
Year	Pop.	±%
1869	316	—
1880	310	−1.9%
1890	314	+1.3%
1900	316	+0.6%
1910	290	−8.2%
1921	295	+1.7%
1930	254	−13.9%
1950	181	−28.7%
1961	171	−5.5%
1970	153	−10.5%
1980	128	−16.3%
1991	132	+3.1%
2001	134	+1.5%
2011	107	−20.1%
2021	123	+15.0%
Source: Censuses
