= Battle of Strehla =

1760 conflict

- Part of the Third Silesian War (Seven Years' War)
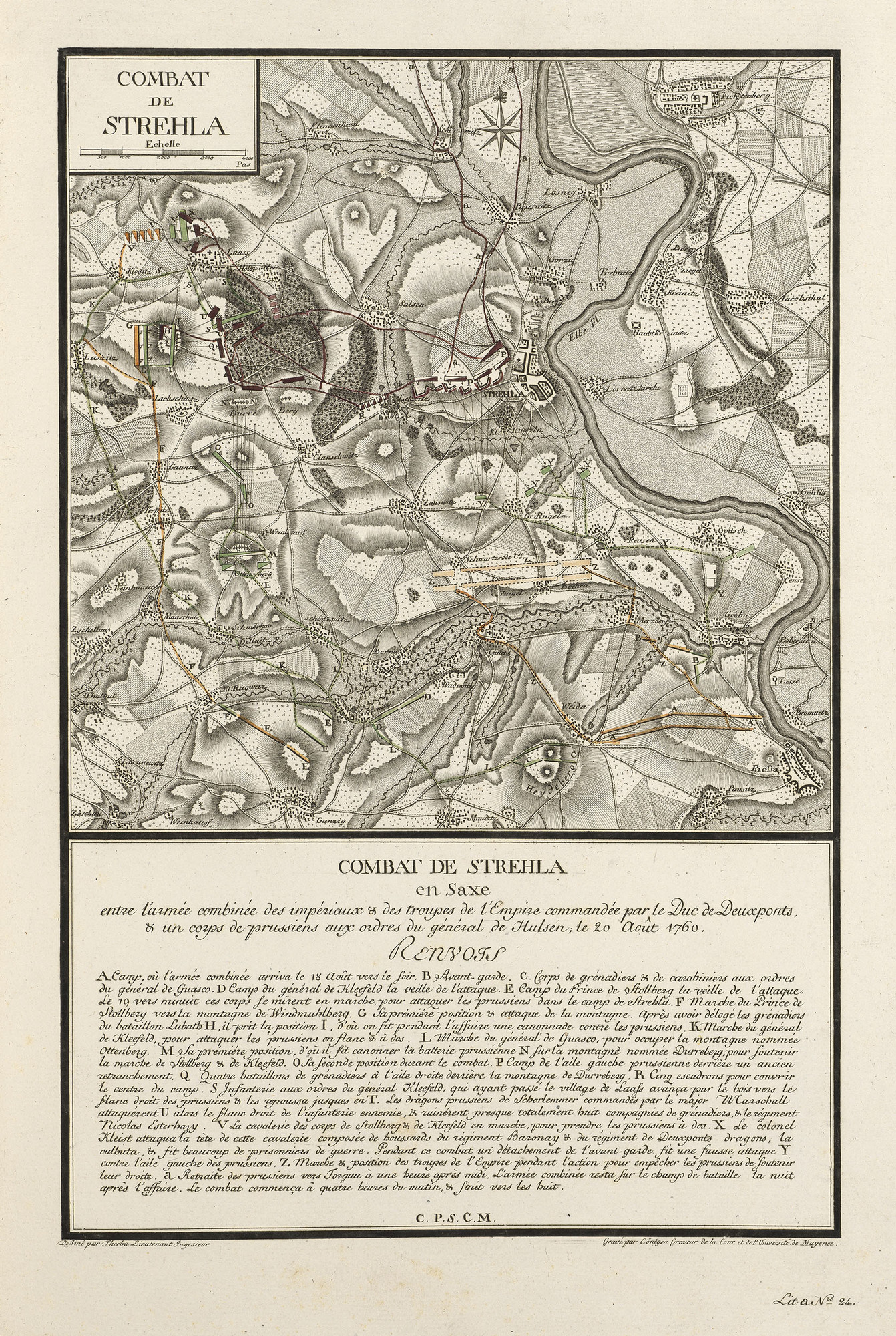
- Battle of Strehla (L. Therbu, G. J. Cöntgen, c. 1760)
Date	20 August 1760
Location	Strehla, Saxony, Germany
Result	Prussian victory

Belligerents
Kingdom of Prussia	(Habsburg monarchy) Austria

Commanders and leaders
Johann Dietrich von Hülsen	Frederick Michael, Count Palatine of Zweibrücken

Strength
12,000	25,000

Casualties and losses
900	1,800

The Battle of Strehla (20 August 1760) was a military engagement fought during the Seven Years' War between the Kingdom of Prussia and Austria. The Austrian army attacked an outnumbered Prussian corps on a strong position but was repulsed. The battle was fought near the town of Strehla in Saxony, Germany.

== Background ==
In August 1760, Fredrick the Great of Prussia and his army made ready to repel further Austrian incursions into Prussian territory. When the Austrian offensive did come, it came in Prussian-occupied Silesia. However, a second Austrian army of 25,000 men also began advancing upon Frederick's holdings in Eastern Saxony, putting the Prussians in danger of being caught in a large pincer movement. To counter this threat, Frederick dispatched Lt. General Johann Dietrich von Hülsen and 12,000 men to hold the west bank of the Elbe river at the town of Strehla while Frederick dealt with the Austrians in Silesia. Five days before the engagement at Strehla, Frederick and his army defeated the Austrian forces in Silesia at the Battle of Liegnitz, effectively rendering the Austrian pincer plan defunct.

Hülsen and his army arrived in Strehla, and began to fortify their position. Rather than risk fording the Elbe at Strehla, the Austrian commander Frederick Michael, Count Palatine of Zweibrücken instead chose to cross the river at a different point and then march parallel to the Elbe until he encountered Hülsen's forces.

== Battle ==
The Prussian army dug in on the high ground around Strehla's suburbs and behind a wood to the west of town. The Austrians arrived from the south, with Zweibrücken splitting his larger army in order to attack the Prussian lines from multiple directions. Despite being aware of this flanking maneuver, Hülsen resolved to fight a battle centered around a static defensive line.

The battle began at 5:00 A.M. with an exchange of fire between the Austrian and Prussian artillery. Soon after, several Prussian battalions broke through the woods near Strehla, forcing a much larger body of Austrian infantry to redeploy to counter them. Meanwhile, the main lines of Prussian and Austrian infantry engaged each other on a field to the immediate south of the town. After two hours of fighting, the Prussians counterattacked and began to push the Austrians back to the south. In the meantime, the Prussian cavalry succeeded in driving back their Austrian counterparts on the Prussian far right flank. Rather than pursue the retreating Austrian cavalry, the Prussian horse reformed, charged, and overran several isolated Austrian infantry battalions. Emboldened by this success, the Prussian infantry in the woods advanced and succeeded in driving back more of the Austrian infantry. With both flanks of his army being forced back, Zweibrücken ordered a withdrawal, and the fighting was concluded by 7:00 A.M.

== Aftermath ==
The Prussian army remained in the field until 1:00 P.M., waiting for a second Austrian attack. When one did not materialize, Hülsen withdrew his army from Strehla and marched to Torgau. The Austrian army returned the next day and occupied the former Prussian position at Strehla.

Hülsen was personally thanked by Frederick for his delaying action and successful repulse of the Austrians.

The Austrian army lost 1,800 men killed, wounded, or captured at Strehla. The Prussian army sustained casualties of 900 men killed or wounded.
