= Tabulae Iliacae =

Roman marble reliefs of Greek epic poetry

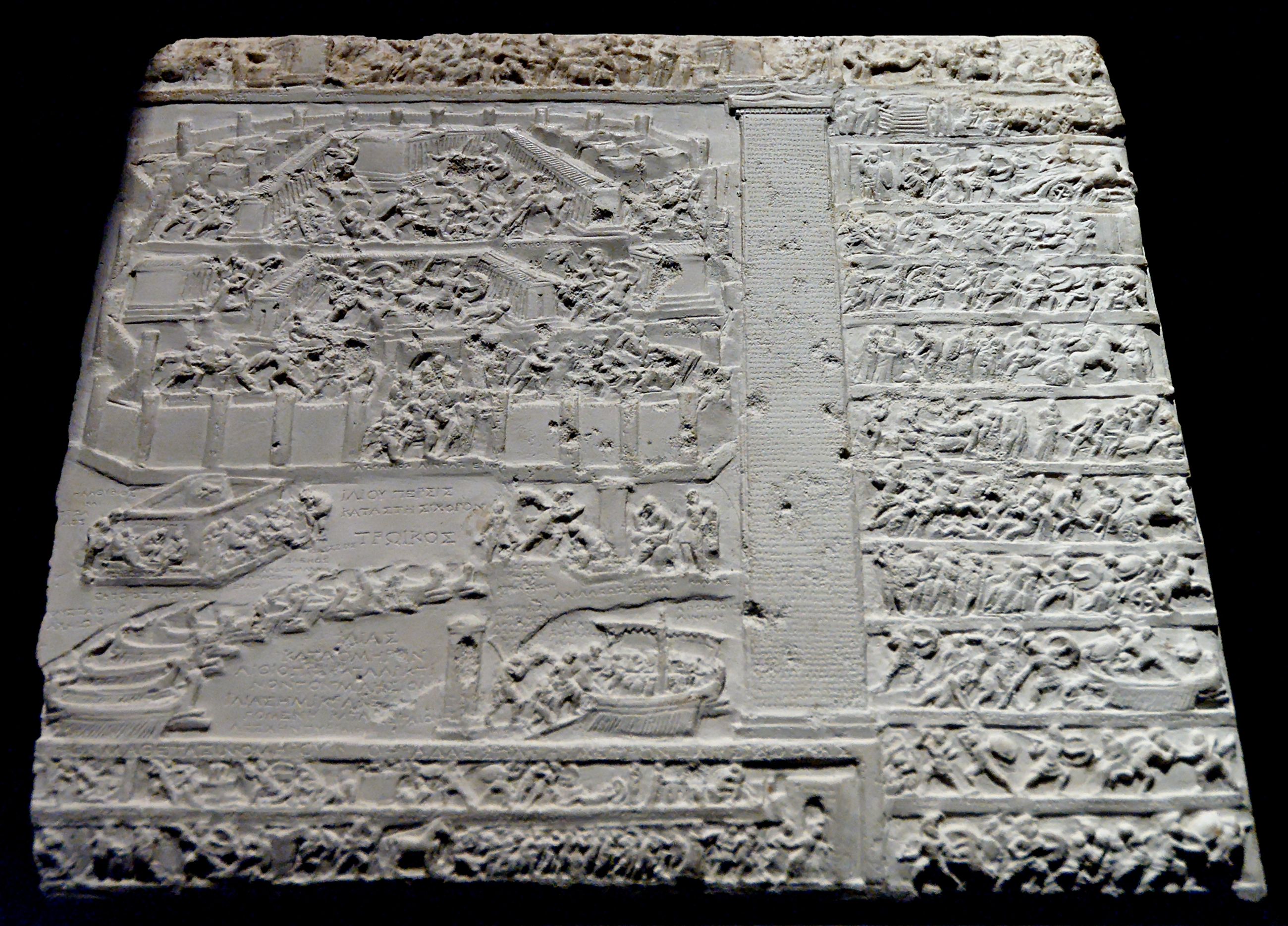
Tabula Iliaca Capitolina, Roman artwork, 1st century AD

The Tabulae Iliacae ("Iliadic tables", "Iliac tables" or "Iliac tablets"; singular Tabula Iliaca) are a collection of 22 stone plaques (pinakes), mostly of marble, with reliefs depicting scenes from Greek epic poetry, especially of the Iliad and the Trojan War. They are all of early Imperial Roman date, and seem to have come from two Roman workshops, one of which seems to have been designed to satisfy a clientele of more modest aspirations.

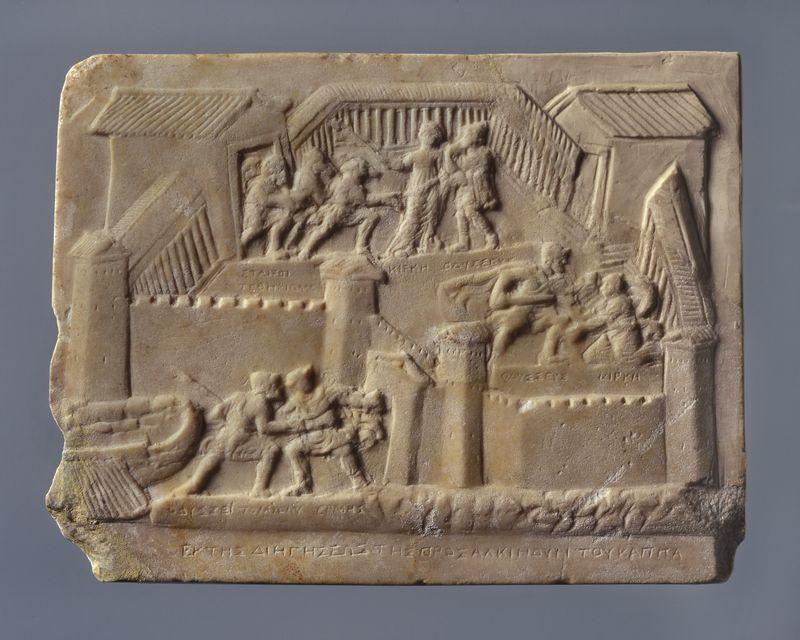
A Tabula Iliaca from the National Museum, Warsaw, so-called "Tabula Rondanini"

== Description of tablets ==
The term is conventionally applied to some twenty-one marble panels carved in very low relief in miniature rectangles with labeling inscriptions typically surrounding a larger central relief and short engraved texts on the obverse. Little can be said about their sizes, since none survives complete. It appears that the largest rectangular tablet is 25 cm by 42 cm. The border scenes, where they can be identified, are largely derived from the Epic Cycle; eleven of the small marble tablets are small pictorial representations of the Trojan War portraying episodes from the Iliad, including two circular ones on the Shield of Achilles. Another six panels depict the sack of Ilium. On the reverse of the Borgia Tabula is a list of titles and authors of epic works, with stichometry, a listing of the number of lines in each epic; though these have occasioned great interest, W. McLeod demonstrated that, far from representing the tradition of Hellenistic scholarship, in every case where facts can be checked with the accepted canon, the compiler of the Borgia Table errs, citing an otherwise unattested Danaides, ascribing a new poem to Arctinus. McLeod suggests literary fakery designed to impress the nouveaux-riches as embodied by the fictional character Trimalchio, who is convinced that Troy was taken by Hannibal; Nicholas Horsfall finds the "combination of error and erudition" designed to impress just such eager newly educated consumers of culture with showy but spurious proofs of their erudition: "The Borgia Table is a pretense of literacy for the unlettered," is McLeod's conclusion. Michael Squire, in "The Iliad in a Nutshell: Visualizing Epic on the Tabulae Iliacae" (Oxford; New York: Oxford University Press, 2011), reviewed in "BMCR" sees in them a more sophisticated product.

=== Tabula Iliaca Capitolina ===
One of the most complete examples surviving is the Tabula Iliaca Capitolina, which was discovered around Bovillae, near Rome. The tablet dates from the Augustan period, around 15 BCE. The carvings depict numerous scenes of the Trojan War, with captions, including an image of Aeneas climbing aboard a ship after the sacking of Troy. The carving's caption attributes its depiction to a poem by Stesichorus in the 6th century BCE, although there has been much scholarly skepticism since the mid-19th century. Theodor Schreiber's Atlas of Classical Antiquities (1895) included a line-by-line description of the tablet with line-drawings. The Tabula Iliaca Capitolina is currently in the Capitoline Museums in Rome.

== Sources ==
- Theodor Bergk Commentatio de tabula Iliaca Parisiensi. Marburg, Typis Elwerti Academicis, 1845.
- Anna Sadurska. Les tables iliaques. Warszawa, Państwowe Wydawn. Naukowe, 1964.
- Nicholas Horsfall "Tabulae Iliacae in the Collection Froehner, Paris". The Journal of Hellenic Studies 103 (1983), pp. 144–47.
- Michael Squire, The Iliad in a Nutshell: Visualizing Epic on the Tabulae Iliacae. Oxford; New York: Oxford University Press, 2011. (Reviews: Bryn Mawr Classical Review 2013.02.32)
- David Petrain, Homer in Stone: The Tabulae Iliacae in their Roman Context. Cambridge: Cambridge University Press.
