= Johann Dietrich von Hülsen =

German canon

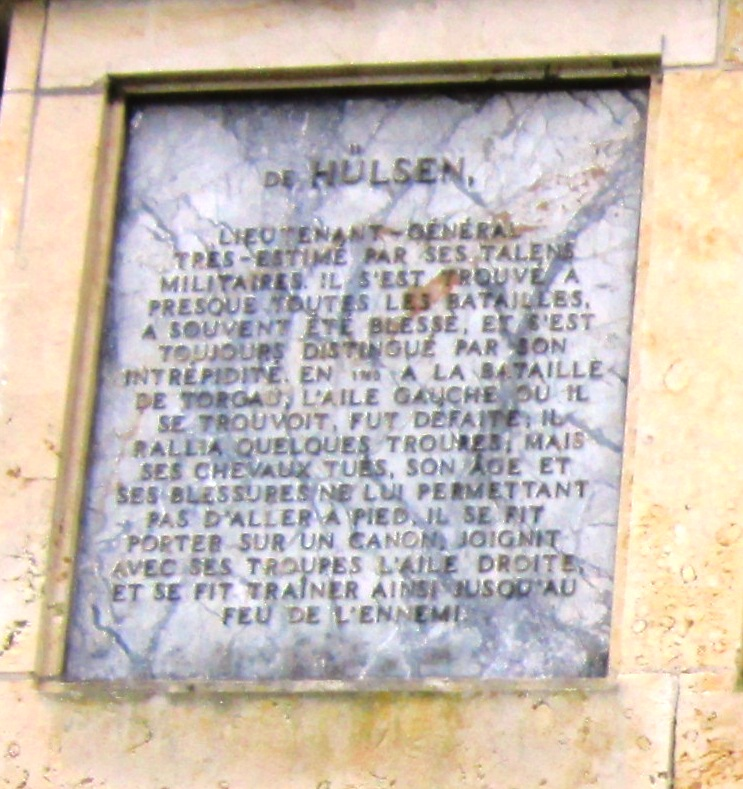
- Hülsen's name is listed among the noble men at Rheinsberg castle
- Born: 1 June 1693; Babziens, East Prussia
- Died: 29 May 1767 (aged 73); Berlin
- Military career
- Allegiance: (Kingdom of Prussia) Prussia
- Branch: Army; Infantry
- Service years: 1715–1767
- Rank: Lieutenant General
- Conflicts: Great Northern War; War of the Polish Succession; War of Austrian Succession; Seven Years' War; Battle of Lobositz; Battle of Torgau; Battle of Kunersdorf; Battle of Strehla
- Awards: Pour le Mérite; Order of the Black Eagle; Equestrian statue of Frederick the Great

Johann Dietrich von Hülsen (1 June 1693–29 May 1767) was a Prussian lieutenant general of the infantry. After a lifelong officer's career in various infantry regiments, he acquired the special respect of Frederick II in the Seven Years' War as general, and was honored by him with the appointment as governor of Berlin. During the war, he became a canon to Minden and was awarded the Black Eagle Order and the Order Pour le Mérite. His name appears on the top tier of the Equestrian statue of Frederick the Great.

== Family ==
Hülsen was a son of Johann Friedrich von Hülsen and Rosine Baroness von Königsegg and grew up in the rural surroundings of Rastenburg. He was born on 1 June 1693 in Babziens. In Fall 1739, he married the twice-widowed Sophie Elisabeth von Kunheim. Their marriage was childless.

== Military career ==
At the age of seventeen, Hülsen entered the Prussian Infantry Regiment No. 2 under the command of Lieutenant General Otto Magnus von Doenhoff, became a Fahnrich (cadet) on 8 June 1715, and took part in the Pomerania campaign of the Great Northern War in the same year. In 1721, the regiment was stationed between Insterburg and Rastenburg. Hülsen was promoted to second lieutenant on 1 August 1722, and on 13 July 1728, to first lieutenant. His length of time as a lieutenant, 15 years, were a consequence of his lack of education and polish. Throughout his career, his manners remained rough and his profanity was legendary.

In the War of the Polish Succession, his regiment, now under the command of Field Marshal Erhard Ernst von Röder, moved to Magdeburg, and subsequently to Heidelberg, with Prince Eugene of Savoy. After the winter camp in the Münsterland, the campaign was carried out without success in 1735, and finally the regiment retreated. In Halberstadt, Hülsen was promoted to the staff captain on the occasion of a troop-show before Frederick William I; in April 1738, back in East Prussia, he was promoted to captain, and received his own company.

=== Wars with Austria ===
In July 1740, Hülsen was placed as a major in the newly-formed 36th Infantry Regiment under Major General Gustav Bogislaus von Münchow, where he remained for sixteen years. In March 1741, the regiment was deployed in Silesia, later under Reichsgeneralfeldmarschall Leopold I of Anhalt-Dessau during the siege of Cosel. After the war, it was stationed in Brandenburg, where Hülsen was promoted to lieutenant colonel on 11 July 1743. In the course of the Second Silesian War, the regiment took part in numerous battles and captured the occupied Cosel on 5 September 1745; subsequently Hülsen was promoted to colonel on 9 November.

In the following peace years, Hülsen emerged above all as a good instructor. On 8 September 1754, now as major general, he was awarded the order Pour le Mérite. After the death of his predecessor, Lieutenant General Asmus Ehrenreich von Bredow, he was appointed Proprietary colonel of the 21st Infantry Regiment on 25 February 1756, which was stationed in Halberstadt and Quedlinburg. He also received an annual pension of 500 thalers.

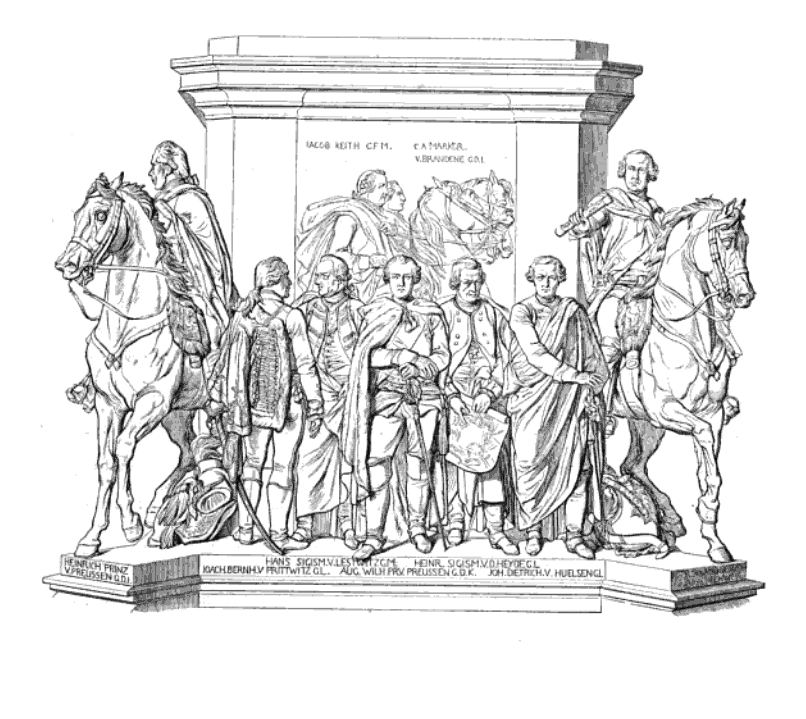
Figure on the Equestrian statue of Frederick the Great: (left to right) Joachim Bernhard von Prittwitz, Hans Sigismund von Lestwitz, Prince Augustus William of Prussia, Heinrich Sigismund von der Heyde, Johann Dietrich von Hülsen.

=== Seven Years' War ===
As an army commander, during the Seven Years' War, he emerged as one of Frederick's most capable generals. In the Battle of Lobositz, his regiment suffered heavy losses, but Frederick II praised Hülsen for his bravery: indeed, at least one historian attributed Hülsen's success at Kolin to his hard-headed fighting. Hülsen, "not much troubled with either imagination or intelligence, was as brave a battle captain as his [Frederick's] army possessed." Hülsen commanded the leading element of Frederick's task force, while his named regiment was fighting under Lieutenant General Joachim Christian von Tresckow. His mission at Kolin was to march along a high road paralleling the Austrian front; after he reached the village of Křečhoř, he was to shift right, clear the heights behind the village and take position facing west, against what Frederick presumed would be the exposed Austrian flank. The complexity of the battle orders, and the conditions of terrain made the execution of Frederick's wishes difficult; Hülsen's troops did not actually advance until mid-afternoon. With these troops, and further support, he managed to take a decisive step in the late afternoon and defend the line until the night. In his writings on the history of the war, Frederick II expressly praised Hülsen's zeal in this battle: certainly, Hülsen's deliberate advance in the afternoon and his stubborn defense of his position into the late afternoon made it possible for him to cover the Prussian retreat; this, as much as Frederick's paucity of generals, warranted Hülsen's promotion to lieutenant general on 6 March 1758.

In the Battle of Kay, Hülsen suffered bloody losses and he himself was later wounded in the subsequent Battle of Kunersdorf. In the Battle of Maxen, he did not arrive in time to support Friedrich August von Finck. On 20 August 1760, he was able to defend himself against a hostile uprising with 12,000 men in the Battle of Strehla, whereupon the King gave him 1500 thalers, and wrote: "I congratulate you [...] [Please extend to ] Officers of your subordinate Corps [...] My most gracious Compliments."

When, in the same year, Austrians and Russians attempted to take Berlin, Hülsen moved to Beelitz and at the Halleschen Gate, Hülsen was able to defend the city against the cavalry of the Russian general Gottlob Heinrich von Tottleben; this defense ultimately prevented the Russian occupation of Berlin. Soon afterwards he returned to Saxony, where Hülsen commanded large parts of the infantry on 3 November 1760 in the Battle of Torgau. His command of the second column at Torgau was due, to some extent, on the army's increasing dearth of senior officers more than to his own gifts, but he was the perfect commander for what ensued. After three unsuccessful and costly attacks, Hülsen gathered the survivors for one more attempt. His own horses had all been killed and a foot wound precluded his walking, so he mounted a cannon and commanded the men to pull him up the hill. The drummers beat the charge, and the Prussians followed Hülsen up the slope. Simultaneously, but without coordination, hussars commanded by General of Cavalry Hans Joachim von Zieten mounted a parallel attack in the next sector. The attack was successful and secured the Prussian victory.

In the following year, under Prince Henry of Prussia, Hülsen was entrusted with the defense of occupied Saxony, and was appointed commander-in-chief on 21 April, when the prince was removed to Silesia. At this point, the memory of the old general evidently diminished, for the king gave him a major general to assist his command. On 29 October 1762 at the Battle of Freiberg, the last great battle of the Seven Years' War, he could not participate as planned, since his replacement had not yet arrived, but he advanced to Pretzschendorf after the battle.

== Post-war assignments and death ==
After the war, Hülsen was honored by Frederick II with the post of governor of Berlin on 23 August 1763, and in 1766 was charged with a court investigation against the financial councilor Erhard Ursinus. In October, he fell ill and died on 29 May 1767 in Berlin. He was buried in the garrison church on 1 June.

In 1851, Hülsen was included on the Equestrian statue of Frederick the Great as one of Frederick's principal generals.
