= Andreas Schato =

German physician and mathematician (1539–1603)

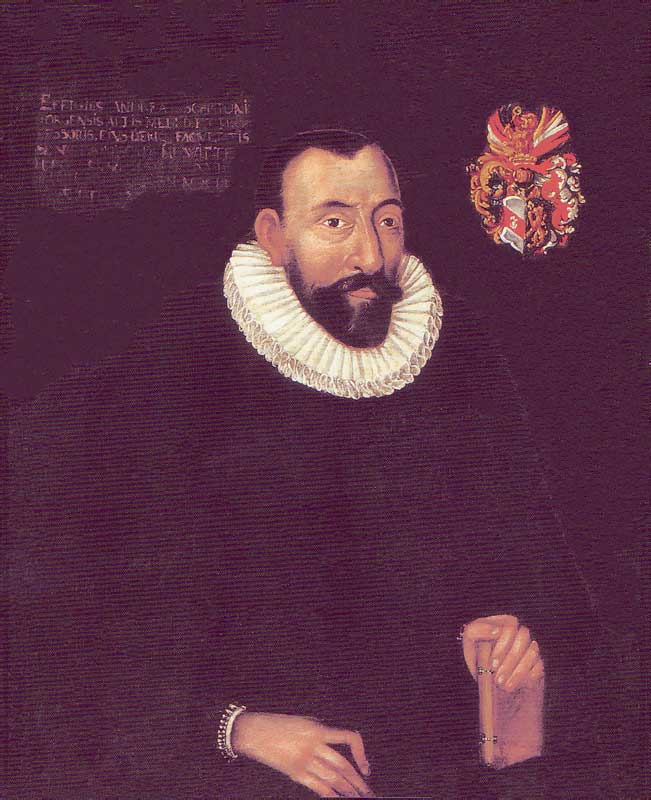
Andreas Schato, portrait held in Wittenberg University

Andreas Schato (1539–1603) was a 16th-century German physician, mathematician, astronomer and scientist.

== Life ==
He was born in Torgau in central Germany on 19 August 1539, the son of N. N. Schato (probably Nikolaus). His mother is not known.

From 1555, he studied sciences at the University of Jena. In 1559, he moved to Wittenberg, where he encountered Melanchthon in his final year of life. At the university, he studied Liberal Arts and graduated in 1562 as a Master of Philosophy. He then briefly joined the faculty of Philosophy in Wittenberg.

In 1564, he moved to Stargard in northern Germany (then known as Pomerania but now part of Poland). From here, he moved to the larger regional capital, Stettin, where he served as Deputy Mayor. Following marriage in Stettin, he returned to Wittenberg in 1570, but, unable to rejoin the Philosophy faculty, took to private lecturing. However, in 1574, he was appointed Professor of Mathematics at the university. Also beginning medical studies, he gained his doctorate in 1578.

In 1581, he became Professor of Physics, and in 1592, Professor of Medicine. In this capacity, he was knighted by Rudolph II, Holy Roman Emperor.

As an astrologer/astronomer, he corresponded with (and possibly met) both Johannes Kepler and Tycho Brahe.

He died in Wittenberg on 17 March 1603. He was buried in the Schlosskirche, Wittenberg, on 19 March in the south aisle, close to the grave of Martin Luther.

== Family ==
He married Rebecca Thymaeus in Stettin around 1569. They had three sons and two daughters.

== Publications ==
- De Morbis Mesenterii (1578)
