= Battle of Torgau =

Battle of the Seven Years War

- Part of the Third Silesian War (Seven Years' War)
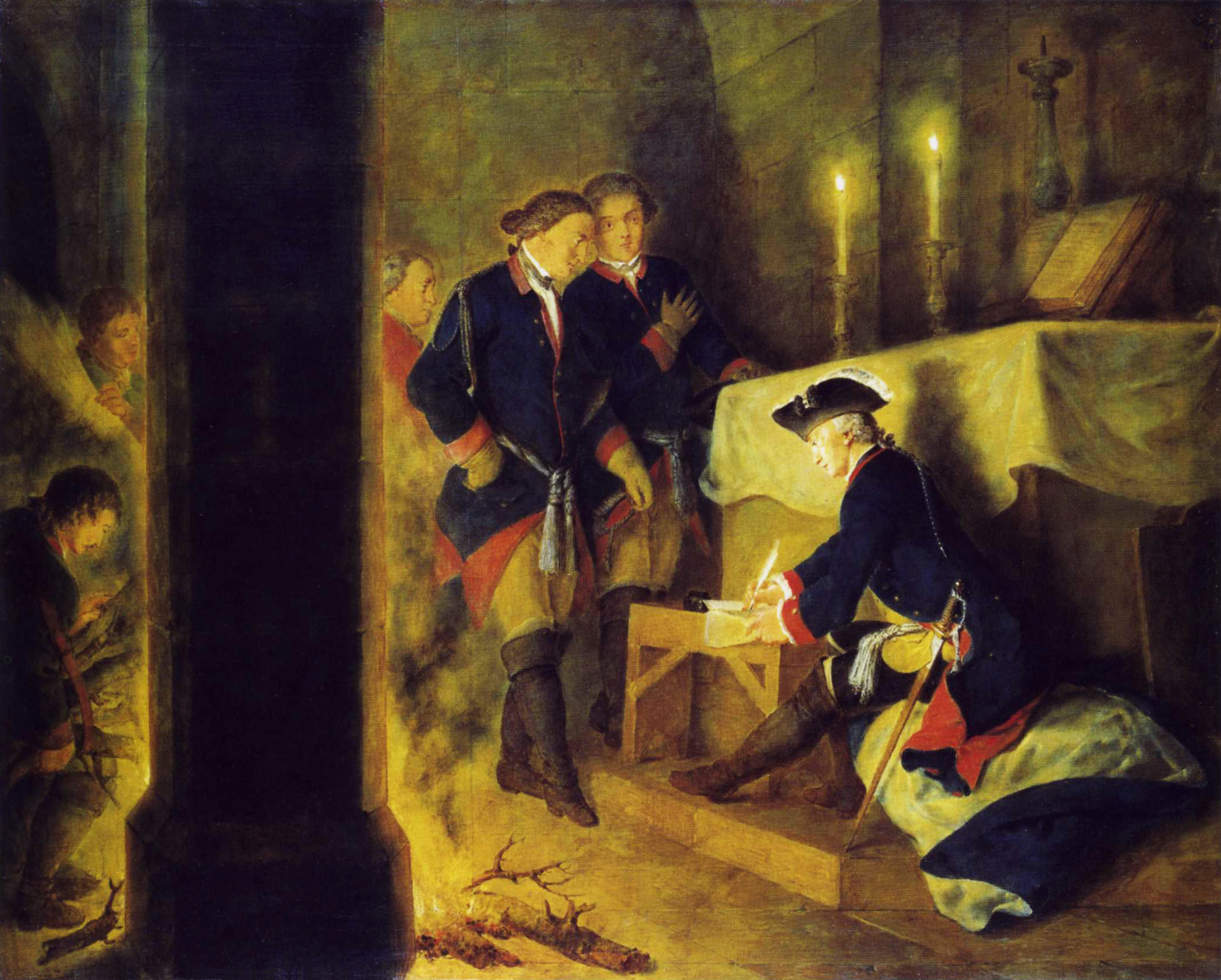
- Frederick the Great after Torgau, by Bernhard Rode
Date	3 November 1760
Location	Süptitzer Höhen, near Torgau, Saxony, Holy Roman Empire 51°34′30″N 12°55′30″E
Result	Prussian victory

Belligerents
(Kingdom of Prussia) Prussia	(Holy Roman Empire) Austria

Commanders and leaders
Frederick the Great (WIA)	Leopold von Daun (WIA)

Strength
48,500; 309 guns	52,000; 275 guns

Casualties and losses
13,120–16,670	11,260–15,897

Frederick the Great
current battle
First Silesian War
Second Silesian War
Third Silesian War

In the Battle of Torgau on 3 November 1760, King Frederick the Great's Prussian army fought an Austrian army under the command of Field Marshal Leopold Josef Graf Daun. The Prussians won a costly victory in one of the bloodiest battles of the Third Silesian War (part of the Seven Years' War).

== Background ==
In August, Daun missed an opportunity to destroy the main Prussian army in Silesia. Outnumbered three-to-one, Frederick escaped the Austrian trap by smashing the corps of Feldzeugmeister Ernst Gideon Freiherr von Laudon at the Battle of Liegnitz. When the Prussians lingered in Silesia, their more numerous enemies attacked. Feldzeugmeister Franz Moritz Graf von Lacy's 18,000 Austrians joined with General Tottleben's Russian force near Berlin, making a total of 35,000 allies. While 13,000 Prussians took refuge in the Spandau fortress, Lacy and Tottleben captured 3,000 Prussians in Berlin on 9 October.

== Plans ==
In late October, Daun slipped out of Silesia and moved west to Saxony where Lacy joined him with his corps. When his government ordered him to stand and fight the Prussians, Daun selected a position on the Süptitzer Höhen (Heights) just west of Torgau.

The plateau had been used by Prince Henry of Prussia in 1759 and was protected on the west by abatis and on the south by a small stream. The Austrians faced south with Lacy's corps nearest Torgau and Daun's army further west. Altogether, Daun and Lacy marshalled 42,000 infantry, 10,000 cavalry, and 275 cannons.

Frederick determined to send General Hans Joachim von Zieten to hold Daun's attention from the south, while his main effort circled around the western end of the Austrian line to attack from the north.

Zieten's corps comprised 21 infantry battalions and 54 cavalry squadrons, while Frederick's main army deployed 41 battalions and 48 squadrons.

In total, the Prussians had 35,000 infantry, 13,500 cavalry, and 309 artillery pieces.

== Battle ==
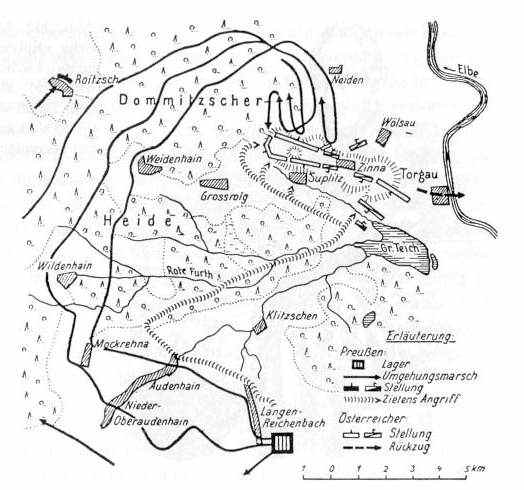
Map of the battle

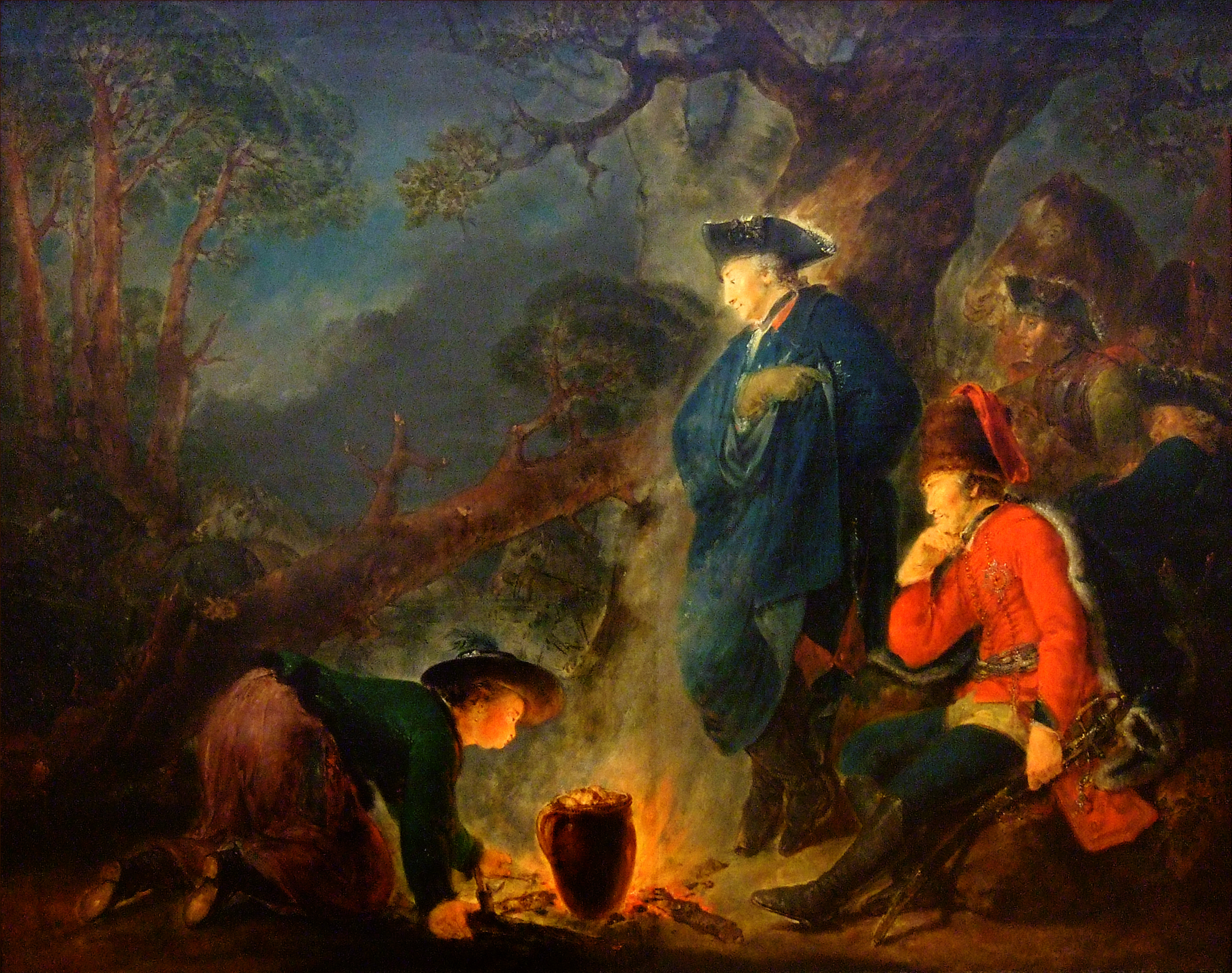
Frederick before the Battle of Torgau

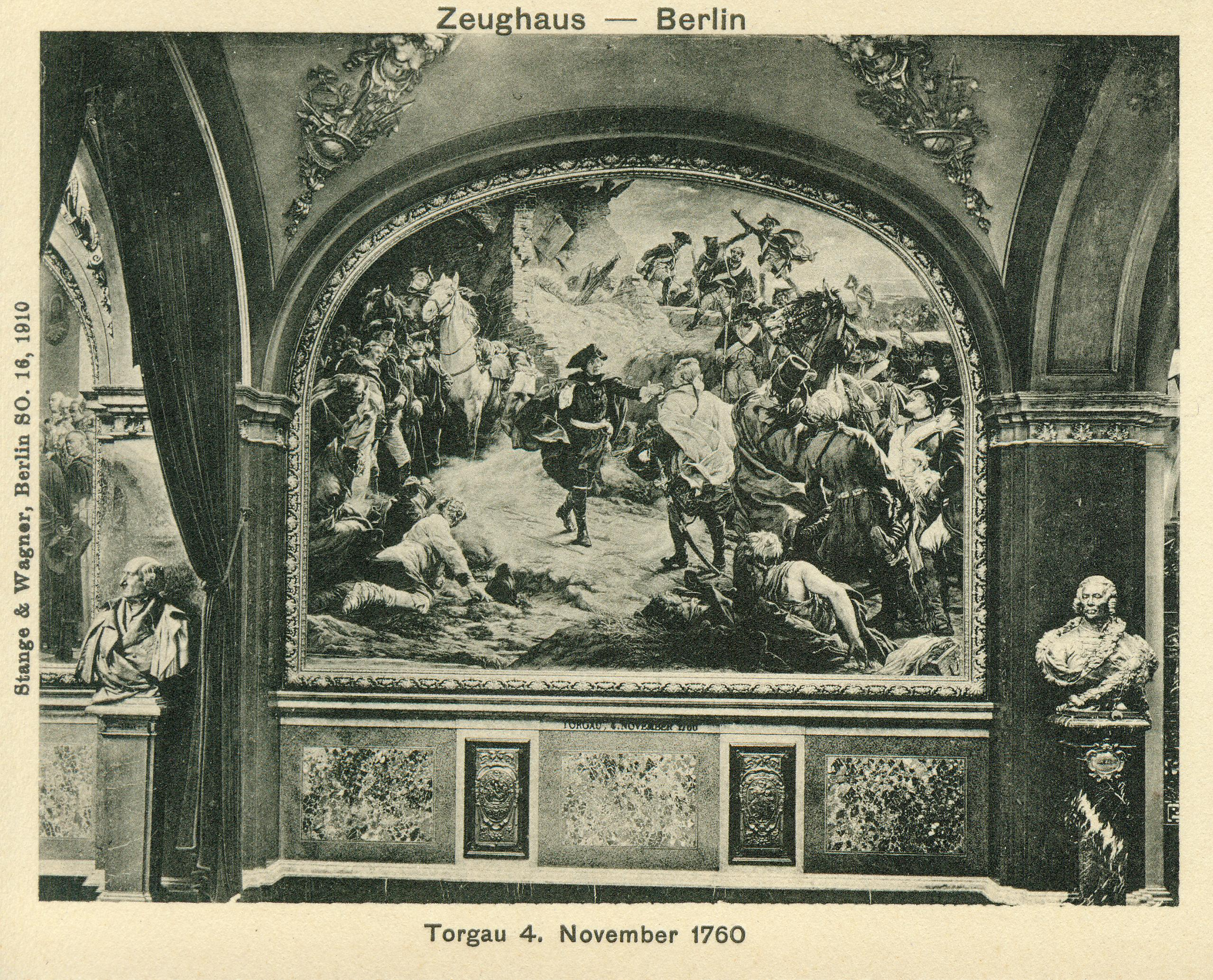
Frederick embracing Zieten after the battle. Ruhmeshalle Berlin, wallpainting by Peter Janssen.

Noon found Frederick's main army floundering in the woods to the north of Daun's position. At this time, Zieten's advance guard became embroiled with the Croatian light infantry belonging to Lacy's corps. Daun alertly detected the Prussian maneuver and he shifted his first line to the north side of the heights. Soon an artillery duel erupted between Lacy and Zieten. Hearing the cannon fire and fearing that Zieten was being mauled, the Prussian king decided to launch his attack prematurely, with ten battalions of grenadiers. Concentrated Austrian cannon fire and musketry caused the loss of 5,000 Prussians in the span of one half-hour.

When the main body of infantry arrived on the scene, it was also sent into the uphill assault. Daun was forced to commit his reserves to defeat the second attack. The Prussian cavalry led by Prince Georg Ludwig of Holstein-Gottorp tried to break the Austrian line, but it also failed. A spent canister round hit Frederick in the chest and he withdrew to the village of Elsnig in considerable distress. The king spent the night sitting on the bottom step of the church altar waiting for news from the battlefield. Daun had been wounded in the foot and around sunset went to Torgau to have his wound dressed. The Austrian commander sent General Charles Flynn to deliver a preliminary victory dispatch to Empress Maria Theresa of Austria in Vienna.

The tide of the battle turned at dusk, when Zieten's columns, who had been engaged pointlessly with Lacy, finally launched a major assault. Shifting his corps to the west, he found an unguarded causeway between two ponds and threw five battalions into the gap. Zieten followed up the initial breach with the balance of his infantry and soon his corps gained a foothold on the heights. Hearing Zieten's battle, Lieutenant General J. D. von Hülsen led the survivors of the main army in a final attack. Taken from the north and south, the Austrian lines finally began to crumble.

Zieten's men captured the Austrian gun battery and turned the cannons on their former owners, who twice tried unsuccessfully to regain the lost battery. By 9:00 p.m. the battle wound down with the Prussians still in control of the heights.

== Results ==
The Prussians won the battle but at a heavy cost. They admitted losses of 16,670, while the Austrians lost 15,897, including some 10,000 men and 49 guns captured. One authority writes,

Even after all this bloodletting the battle of Torgau decided little in strategic terms, for Daun still held Dresden and southern Saxony, while the troublesome Laudon was free to take up winter quarters in Silesia.

The battle left both sides exhausted. After losing as much if not more men than its enemy, Prussia was again severely weakened. However, without the prospect of a decisive victory against the Prussians, and with dwindling financial resources, Austria was also losing much of its offensive power. After the campaign of 1760, it had to reduce the size of its army, which left little hope of crushing Prussia without the help of Russia, which withdrew in 1762. For the Austrians, the battle was hence a severe psychological blow that decreased their hope of winning a decisive victory.

== Sources ==
- Duffy, Christopher. The Army of Frederick the Great. NY: Hippocrene Books, 1974. ISBN 0-88254-277-X
- Duffy, Christopher. The Military Life of Frederick the Great. Atheneum, 1986. ISBN 0-689-11548-2
- Szabo, Franz. The Seven Years War in Europe: 1756–1763. Routledge, 2013, ISBN 978-1-317-88696-9.
- Clodfelter, M. (2017). Warfare and Armed Conflicts: A Statistical Encyclopedia of Casualty and Other Figures, 1492-2015 (4th ed.). Jefferson, North Carolina: McFarland. ISBN 978-0-7864-7470-7.
- Bond, Brian (1998). The pursuit of victory : from Napoleon to Saddam Hussein. Oxford: Oxford University Press. ISBN 978-0198207351.
- Nolan, Cathal J. (2017). The allure of battle : a history of how wars have been won and lost. Oxford, UK: Oxford University Press. ISBN 978-0195383782.
