= Carl Loebner Torgau =

German toy retailer

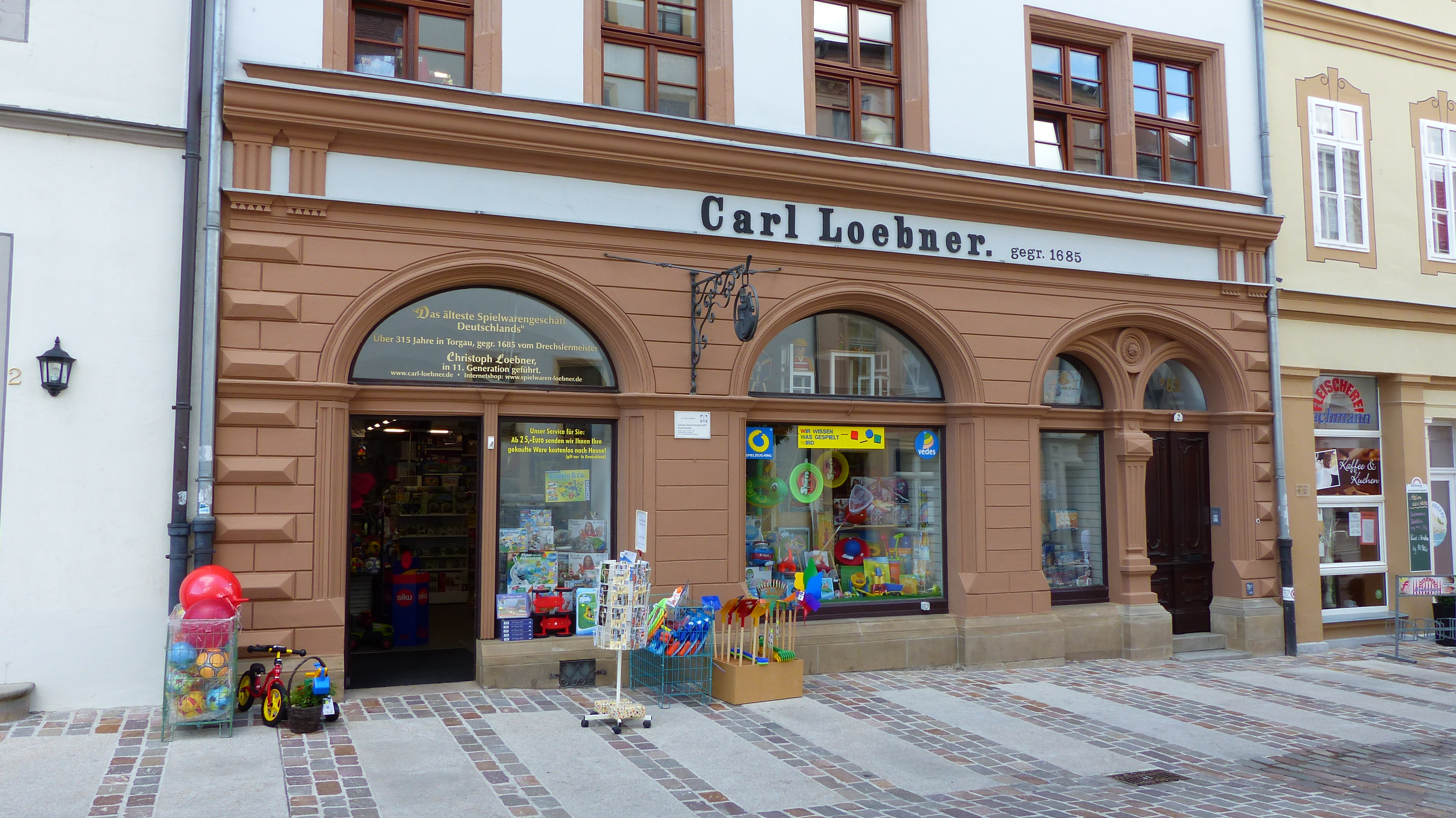
- Bäckerstraße 2 Löbau
- Type: Subsidiary
- Industry: Retail
- Founded: 1685; 341 years ago
- Founder: Christoph Loebner
- Headquarters: Torgau, Germany
- Number of locations: 1
- Area served: Worldwide
- Products: Toys; Games; Dolls

Carl Loebner, located in Torgau, Germany, is a German toy store. The first documented mention of the workshop in the history of Torgau goes back to the year 1685. The company has always been passed down from father to son and is currently run by the twelfth generation.

== History ==
At the end of 1685, after his marriage in Leipzig, master wood turner Christoph Loebner opened his master workshop in turning craft in Torgau and made wooden toys. Company names were first officially recorded in the time of his grandson Carl Loebner, giving the company the name it still uses today.

In 1780 guild master Johann-George Loebner acquired the house on Bäckerstraße on Torgau's market square, which is still used today as a shop, and continued to manufacture his wooden toys there, which he first sold on the markets in the area and at the Leipzig Trade Fair sold. His initial products were wooden dolls, drumsticks, spinning tops, skittles, whistles and billiard balls.

Starting with the sixth generation, the Loebners became toy merchants only, and ceased toy production.

Frommer's travel guide includes the shop on its list of 10 tourist-friendly businesses open 275 years or longer, describing it as an emporium featuring its own range of wooden toys as well as leading international toy brands.
