= Torgau =

Town in Saxony, Germany

- Town
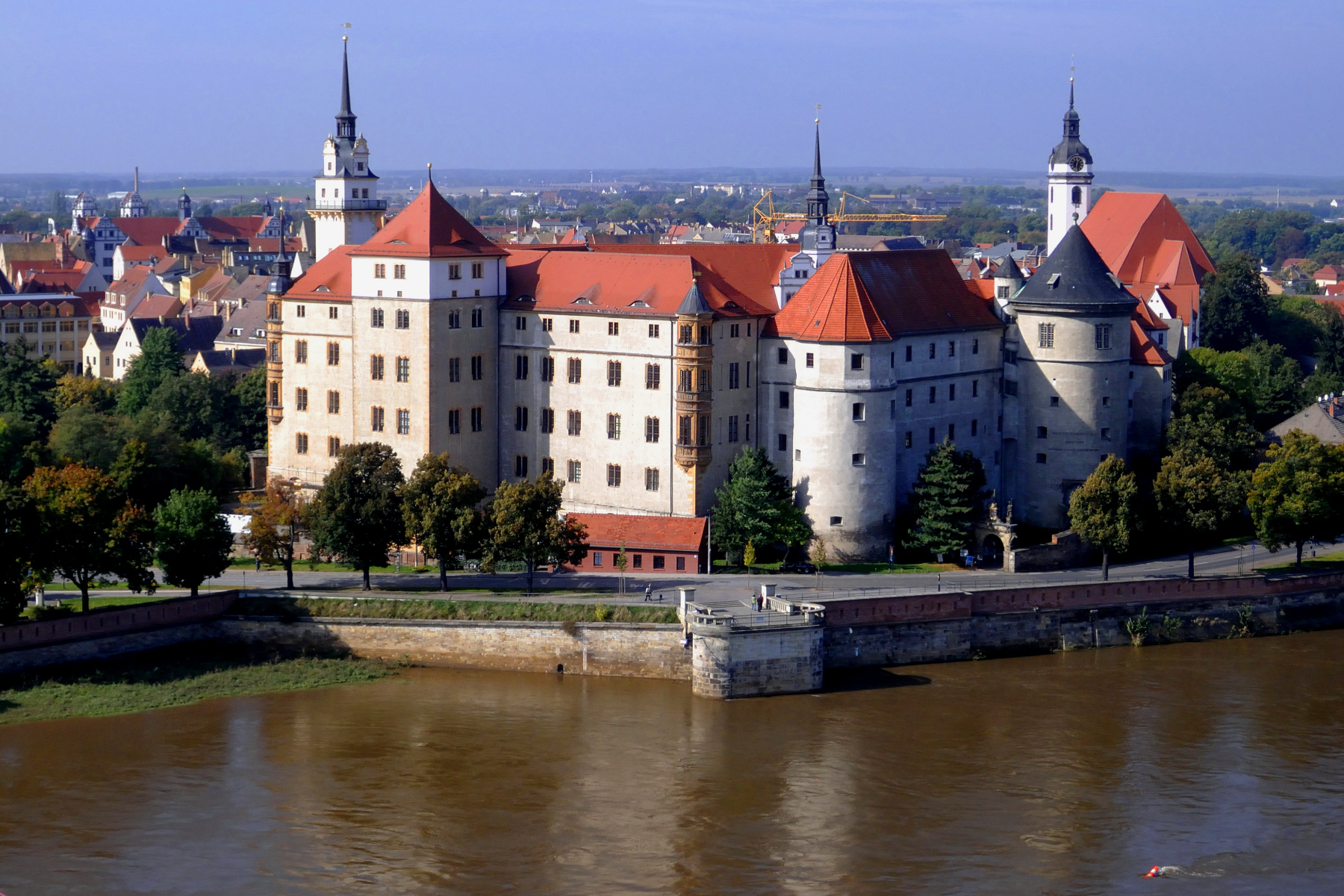
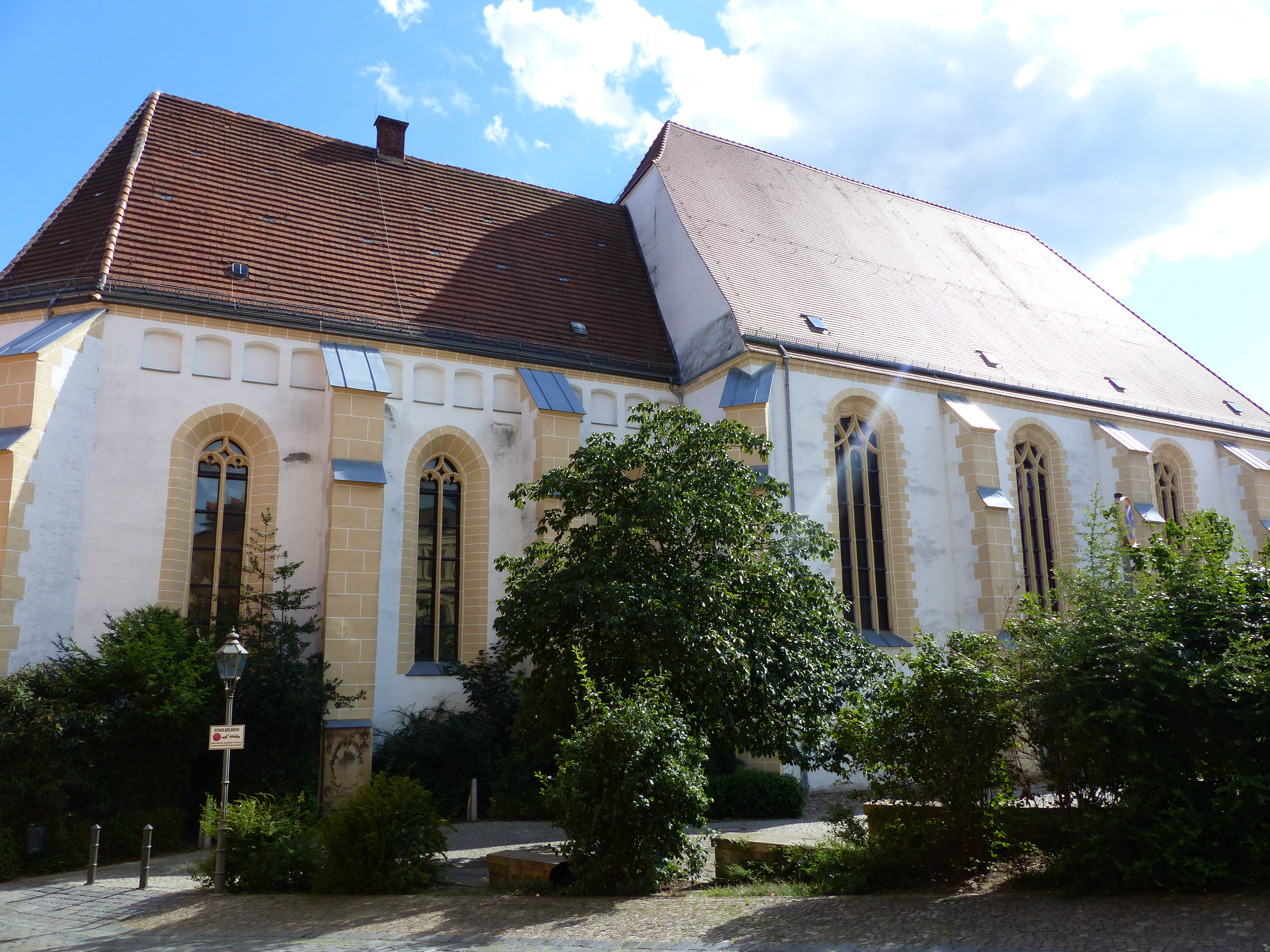
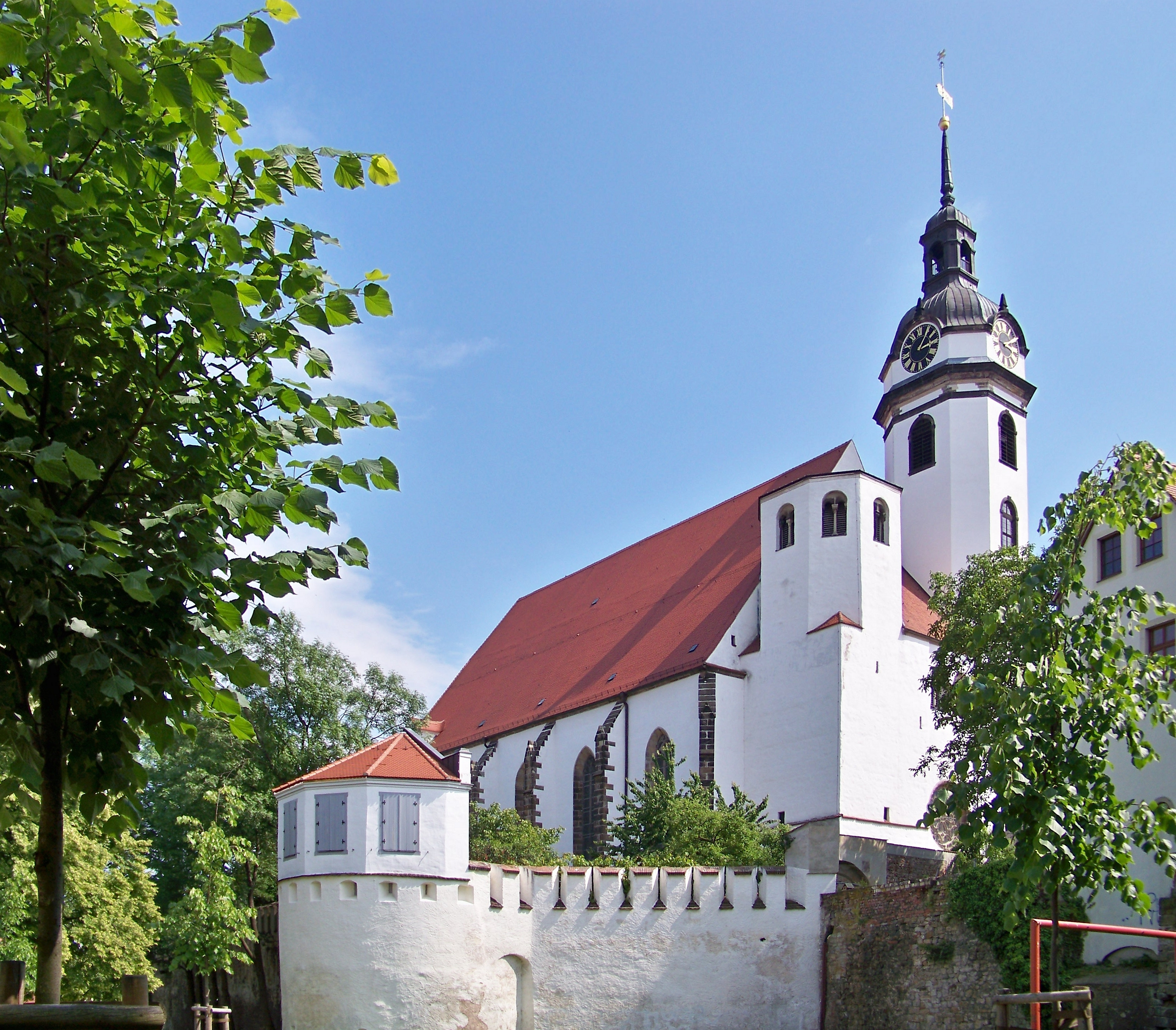
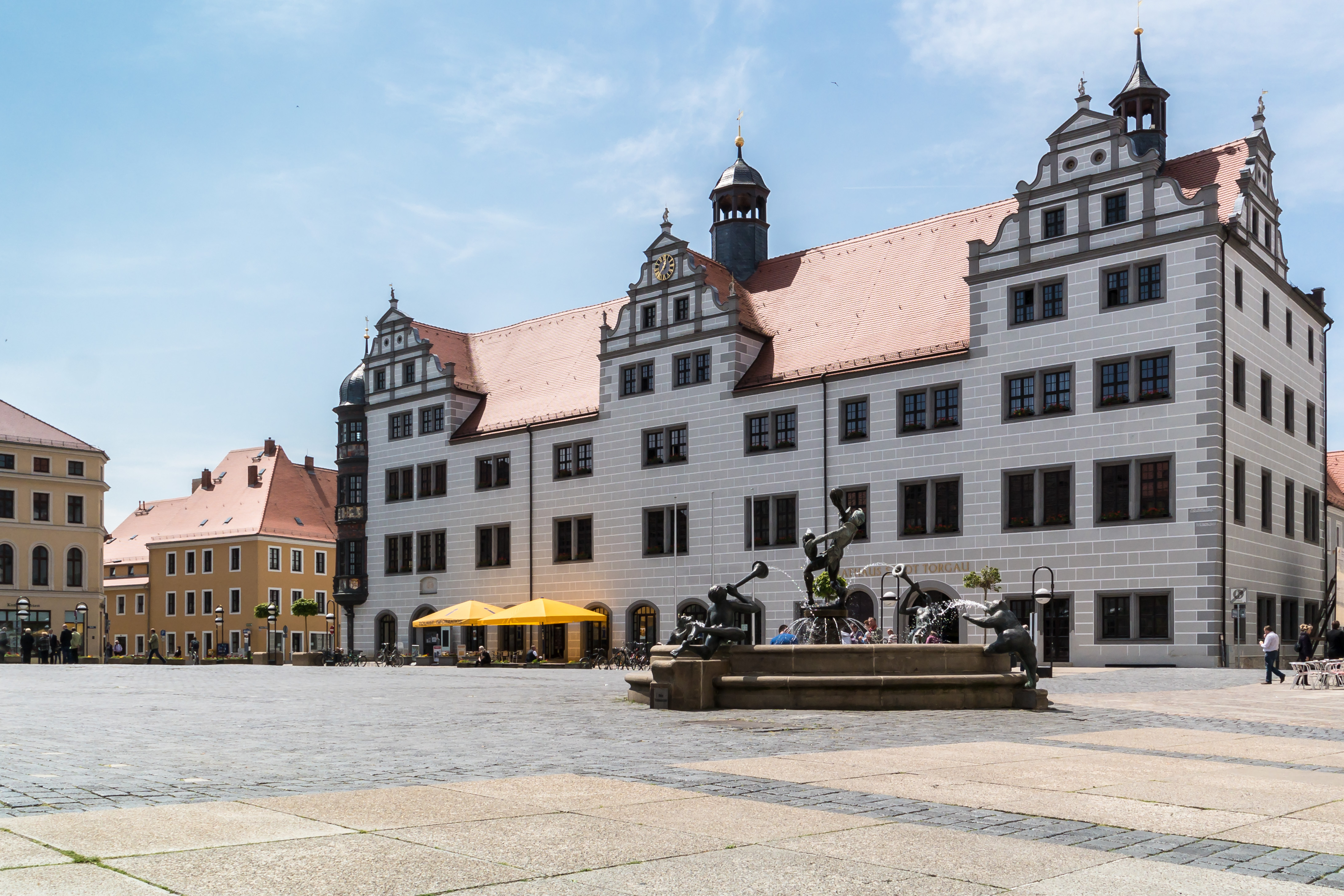
- Hartenfels Castle Alltags church St. Maries church Town hall at Market square

- Coat of arms

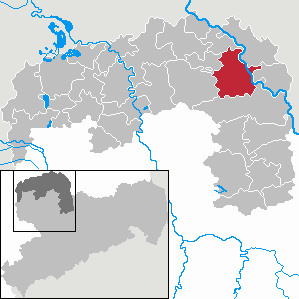
- Location of Torgau within Nordsachsen district
- Interactive map of Torgau
- Location within Germany Location within Saxony
- Coordinates: 51°33′37″N 13°0′20″E
- Country: Germany
- State: Saxony
- District: Nordsachsen

Government
  - Mayor (2022–29): Henrik Simon (Independent)

Area
  - Total: 102.81 km^{2} (39.70 sq mi)
- Elevation: 78 m (256 ft)

Population (2025-12-31)
  - Total: 19,855
  - Density: 193.12/km^{2} (500.19/sq mi)
- Time zone: UTC+01:00 (CET)
  - Summer (DST): UTC+02:00 (CEST)
- Postal codes: 04860
- Dialling codes: 03421
- Vehicle registration: TDO, DZ, EB, OZ, TG, TO
- Website: www.torgau.eu

Torgau (German pronunciation: [ˈtɔʁɡaʊ]) is a town on the banks of the Elbe in northwestern Saxony, Germany. It is the capital of the district Nordsachsen.

Outside Germany, the town is best known as where on 25 April 1945, the United States and Soviet Armies first met near the end of World War II.

== History ==
Map of Torgau and the surrounding area (around 1770)

The settlement goes back to a Slavonic settlement named Turguo in the shire of Neletici. There was presumably a wooden Slavonic castle located on the site of the present-day Hartenfels castle.

In the 10th century it fell under the rule of the Holy Roman Empire, and a stone castle was built, around which the settlement congregated. A market is attested in 1119. The town was located on the important trade route, the Via Regia Lusatiae inferioris, between Leipzig and Frankfurt an der Oder that crossed the river Elbe at a ford east of Torgau.

Torgau belonged to the duchy of Saxe-Wittenberg, which in 1356 was raised to be the Electorate of Saxony. After the last Ascanian duke died without issue in 1423, the Electorate passed to the Wettin dynasty, which took up its residence at Torgau.

Following the Treaty of Leipzig partition of the Wettin inheritance on 26 August 1485, Torgau fell to the Ernestine line. Frederick III, Elector of Saxony and his successors had Hartenfels Castle at Torgau built by architect Conrad Pflüger and his successor Konrad Krebs.

The Ernestine court resided mainly in Torgau and in Weimar. From 1525 onward, Torgau became the sole residence. Hartenfels Castle is the largest completely preserved castle of the early Renaissance in Germany. After the Battle of Mühlberg in 1547, Torgau fell to the Albertine line.

During the Reformation, the town council closed all cloisters in 1523. Citizens of Torgau destroyed paintings and statues of saints in the churches and stormed the Franciscan monastery.

After Martin Luther had driven Andreas Karlstadt from Saxony in 1524, he enforced the expulsion of Karlstadt's followers from Torgau in 1529. Katharina von Bora, the widow of Luther, died in Torgau and is buried there in the Marienkirche. The court chapel, constructed in 1543–44 by Nikolaus Gromann, was consecrated by Luther on 5 October 1544; it is thus the second oldest newly constructed Protestant church in the world, after the court chapel of Neuburg Castle which was consecrated in 1543.

The Torgauer Artikel, a draft of the Augsburg Confession, was composed by Luther, Melanchthon, Bugenhagen and Jonas in the electoral superindenture in 1530 (Wintergrün). The Lutheran Formula of Concord was written in Torgau in 1576.

The first German opera, Heinrich Schütz's Dafne, was presented at the court in Torgau in 1627.

In the Battle of Torgau, fought on 3 November 1760, a Prussian army under the command of King Friedrich the Great defeated a larger Austrian army under the command of Field Marshal Leopold Josef Graf Daun, a major battle of the Seven Years' War. After the Congress of Vienna, it was passed to Prussia in 1815.

=== World War II ===
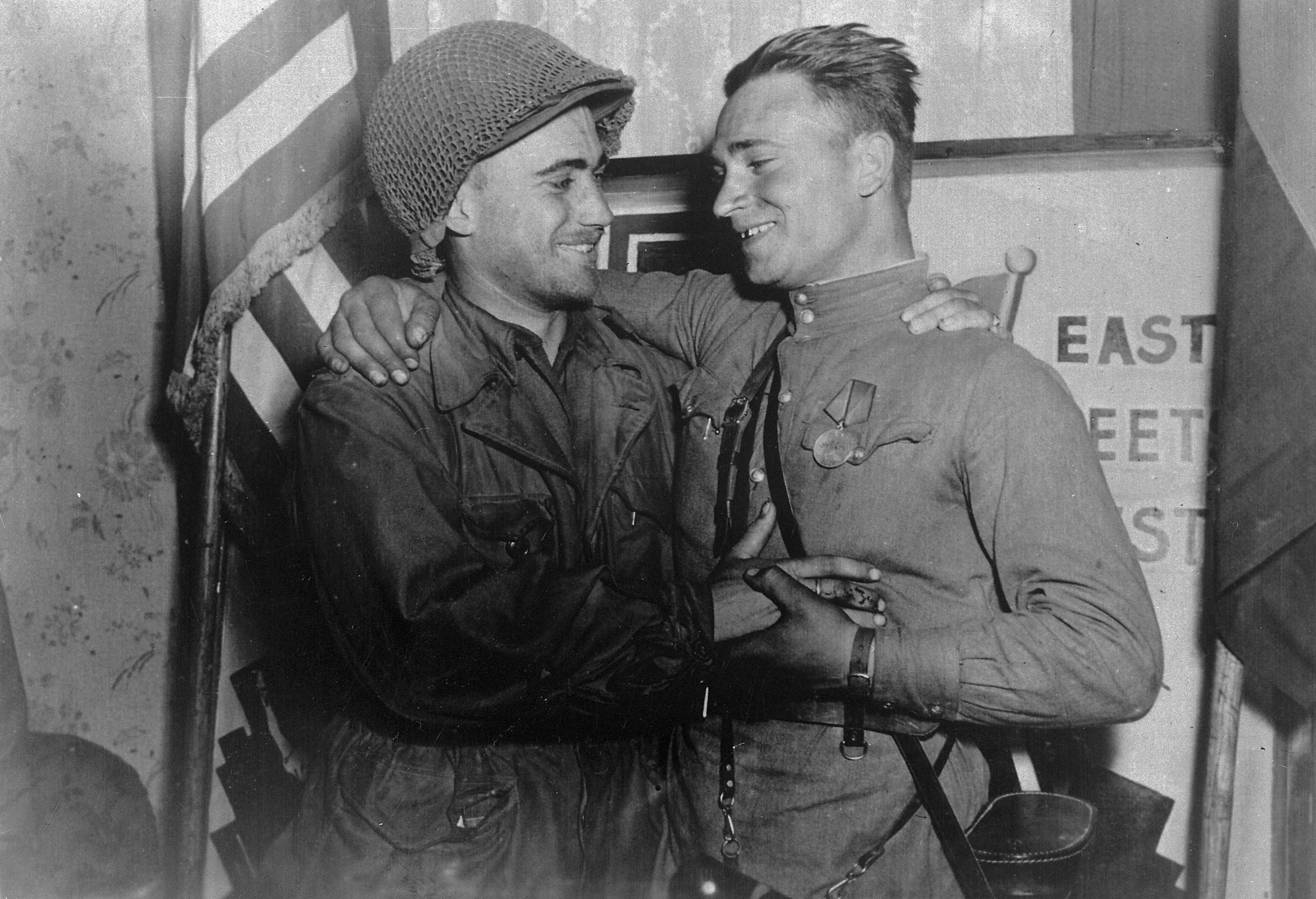
In an arranged photo commemorating the meeting of the Soviet and American armies, 2nd Lt. William Robertson (U.S. Army) and Lt. Alexander Silvashko (Red Army) stand facing one another with hands clasped and arms around each other's shoulders. In the background are two flags and a poster.

The town is where, during World War II, the United States Army from the west and the Red Army from the east met during the invasion of Germany on 25 April 1945, remembered as "Elbe Day".

Units of the U.S. First Army and the Soviet First Ukrainian Front met on the bridge at Torgau, and at Lorenzkirch (near Strehla), 20 miles to the south. The unit commanders met the following day at Torgau for an official handshake. This marked the beginning of the line of contact between Soviet and American forces, but not the finalized occupation zones. In fact, the area surrounding Torgau, initially occupied by U.S. forces, was given over to Soviet forces in compliance with the Yalta Agreement.

After the war, in 1949, the film Encounter at the Elbe was released by Mosfilm about the meeting of both armies.

Torgau is home to one of the prisons in which Reinhold Eggers spent his postwar imprisonment after he had been sentenced by the Soviets. He had been the security officer at Oflag IV-C during the war in Colditz Castle.

=== Post–World War II ===
After the war, the Soviet secret police agency NKVD established its Special Camps Nos. 8 and 10 in Fort Zinna and in the nearby Seydlitz barracks. Germans and some Soviet citizens were interned here or served sentences passed by the Soviet military tribunals. The East German People's Police used the Fort Zinna prison from 1950 to 1990 as a penitentiary. In the 1950s, it primarily housed political prisoners.

The Memorial Site Torgau (formerly Documentation and Informationcenter Torgau (DIZ)), founded in 1991 and now under the administration of the Saxon Memorial Foundation for the commemoration of the victims of political despotism, researches and presents the history of the Torgau prisons in the permanent exhibition "Courage and Helplessness". Recent commentary distinguishes the camps run by the Nazis and the Soviets.

After World War II, Torgau was initially the district center of the state of Saxony-Anhalt in East Germany. After the dissolution of the states of East Germany in 1952, it became part of Bezirk Leipzig. In 1990, after the reunification of Germany, it became part of the Leipzig region of the state of Saxony. In 2008 it became the center of the Nordsachsen district.

== Geography ==
The town Torgau consists of Torgau proper and the following Ortschaften, or municipal divisions:

- Beckwitz
- Graditz
- Loßwig
- Mehderitzsch
- Melpitz
- Staupitz
- Weßnig
- Zinna

Beckwitz, Loßwig, Mehderitzsch, Staupitz and Weßnig were part of the former municipality Pflückuff, which was absorbed into Torgau on 1 January 2009.

== Population development ==
1831 – 6,440; 1885 – 10,988 ^{1}; 1946 – 18,455; 1950 – 19,683	1960 – 19,690; 1981 – 21,222; 1984 – 21,508; 1999 – 19,571	2002 – 19,062; 2004 – 18,843; 2005 – 18,719; 2007 – 17,837	2010 – 19,688 ^{2}; 2012 – 20,248; 2013 – 20,092; 2014 – 19,964

Data source from 1999: Statistical office Saxony

^{1} including barracks
^{2} Incorporation Pflückuff

== Sights ==
Sights include the historic town center, restored since German reunification, a brewery museum, the monument for the meeting of the Russian and American troops on the Elbe, and a Russian military cemetery. Carl Loebner Torgau is claimed to be the world's oldest toy store. The first documented mention of the shop in the history of Torgau goes back to the year 1685.

The early Renaissance Hartenfels Castle dominates the town. The chapel was built in 1544 (designed by Nickel Gromann) and combines late Gothic with early Renaissance elements. It was consecrated by Martin Luther on 5 October 1544. Brown bears are still kept in the moat.

== Twin towns – sister cities ==
Torgau is twinned with:

- Hämeenkyrö, Finland
- Sindelfingen, Germany
- Znojmo, Czech Republic

== Notable people ==
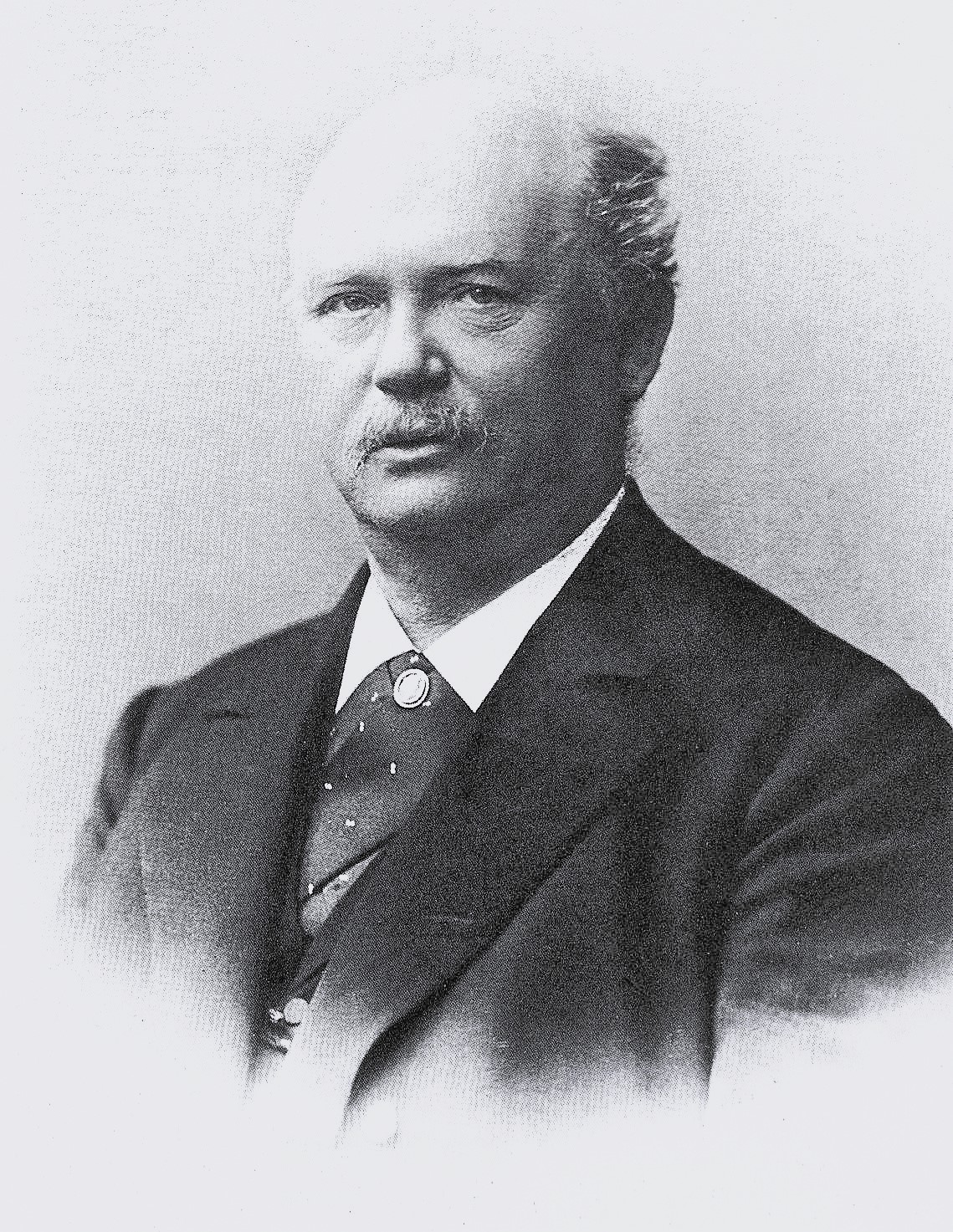
Georg von Siemens, 1895

- Frederick III, Elector of Saxony (1463–1525) Elector of Saxony, protected Martin Luther
- Nicolaus von Amsdorf (1483–1565), Lutheran theologian and early Protestant reformer
- Leonhardt Schröter (c.1532 – c.1601), Renaissance choirmaster, teacher and composer
- Andreas Schato (1539–1603), physician, mathematician, astronomer and scientist
- Johann Philipp, Duke of Saxe-Altenburg (1597–1639), duke of Saxe-Altenburg
- Dorothea of Saxe-Altenburg (1601–1675), princess from the House of Wettin
- Eduard Oscar Schmidt (1823–1886), zoologist and phycologist
- Georg von Siemens (1839–1901), founding director of Deutsche Bank
- Leonhard Koeppe (1884–1969), ophthalmologist
- Wolf Roth (born 1944), actor
- Wolfgang Klotz (born 1951), gymnast
- Olaf Marschall (born 1966), footballer
- Kai Kazmirek (born 1991), decathlon athlete

== Gallery ==
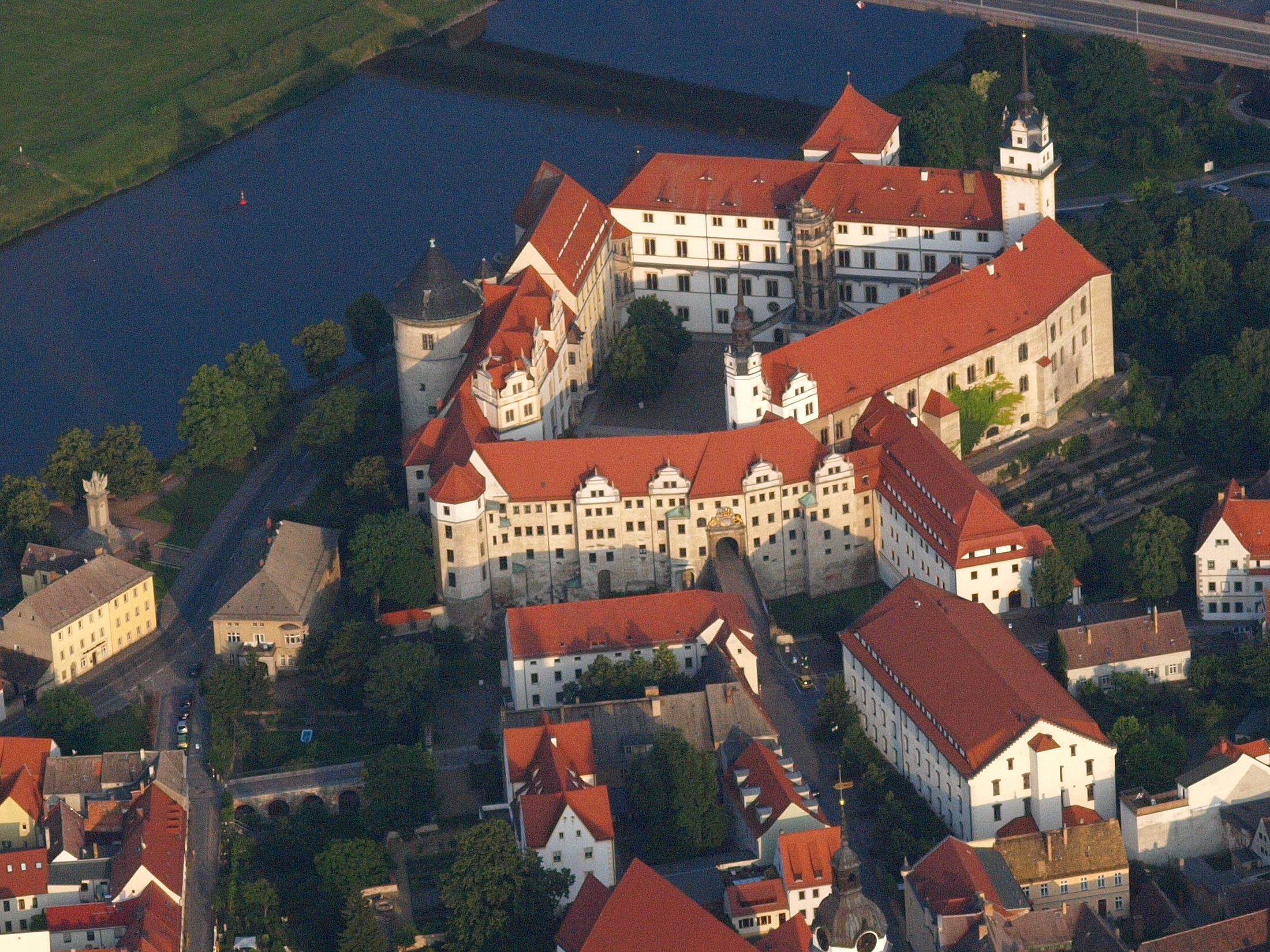
Hartenfels Castle

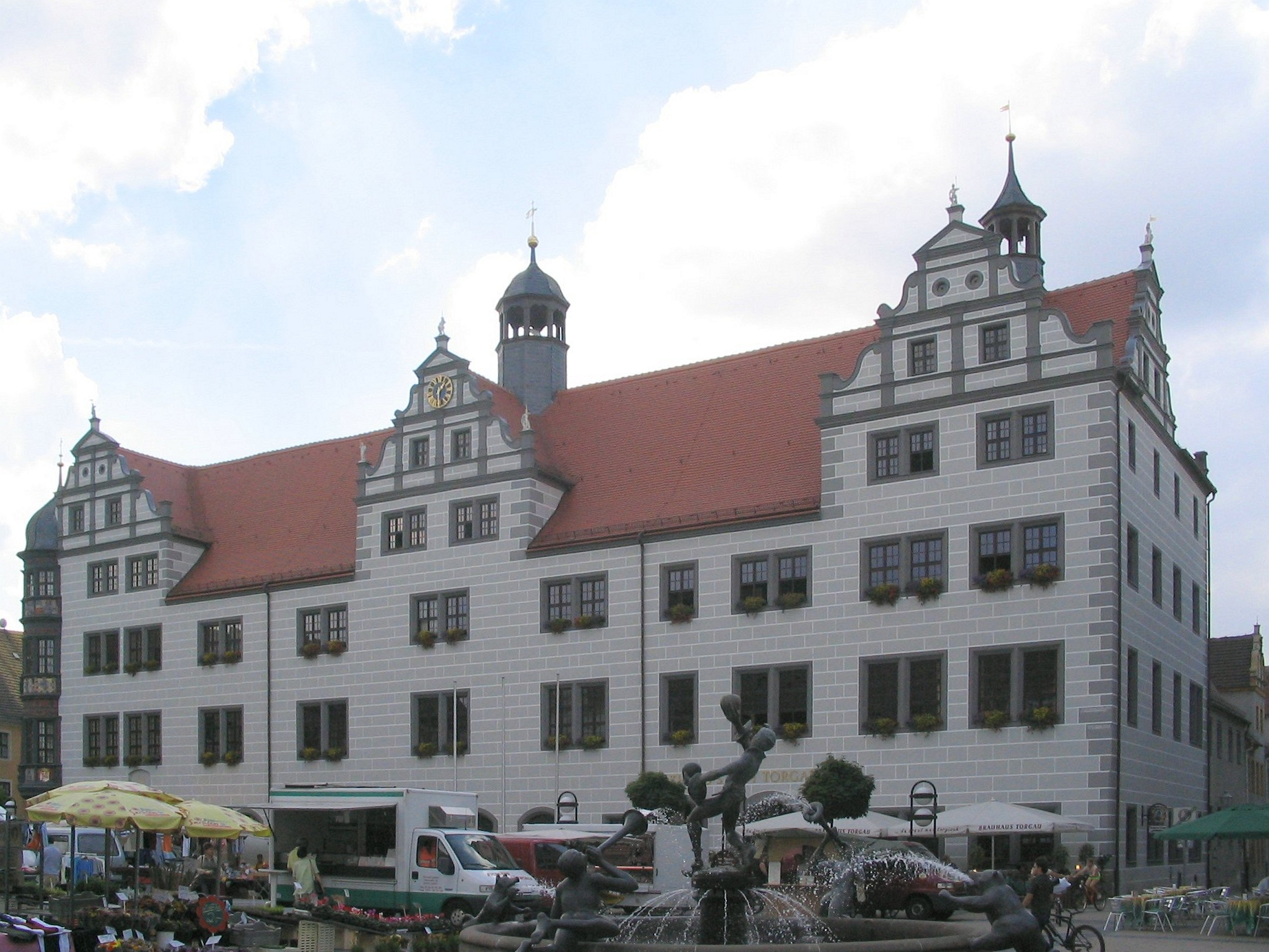
Town hall

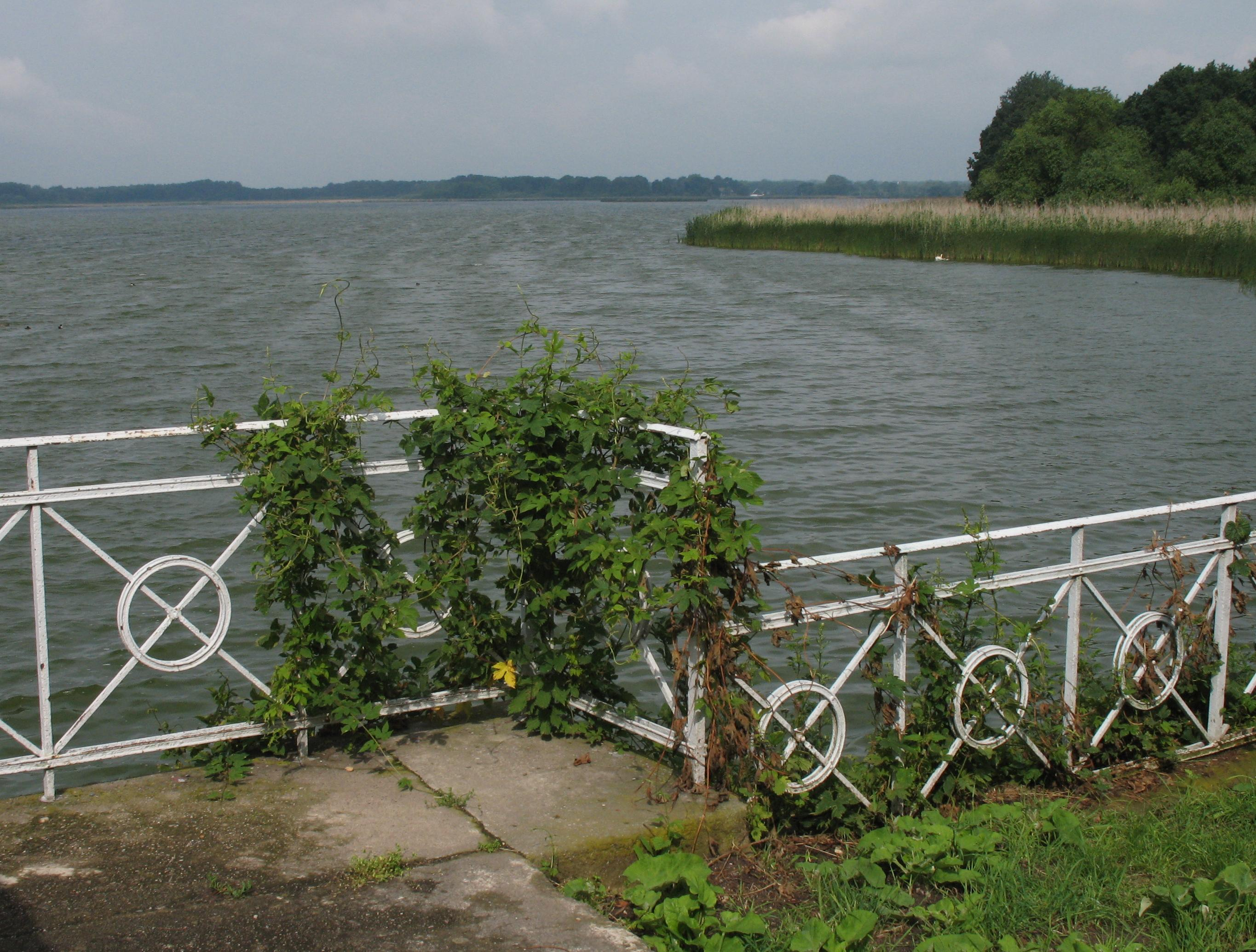
Lake Torgau

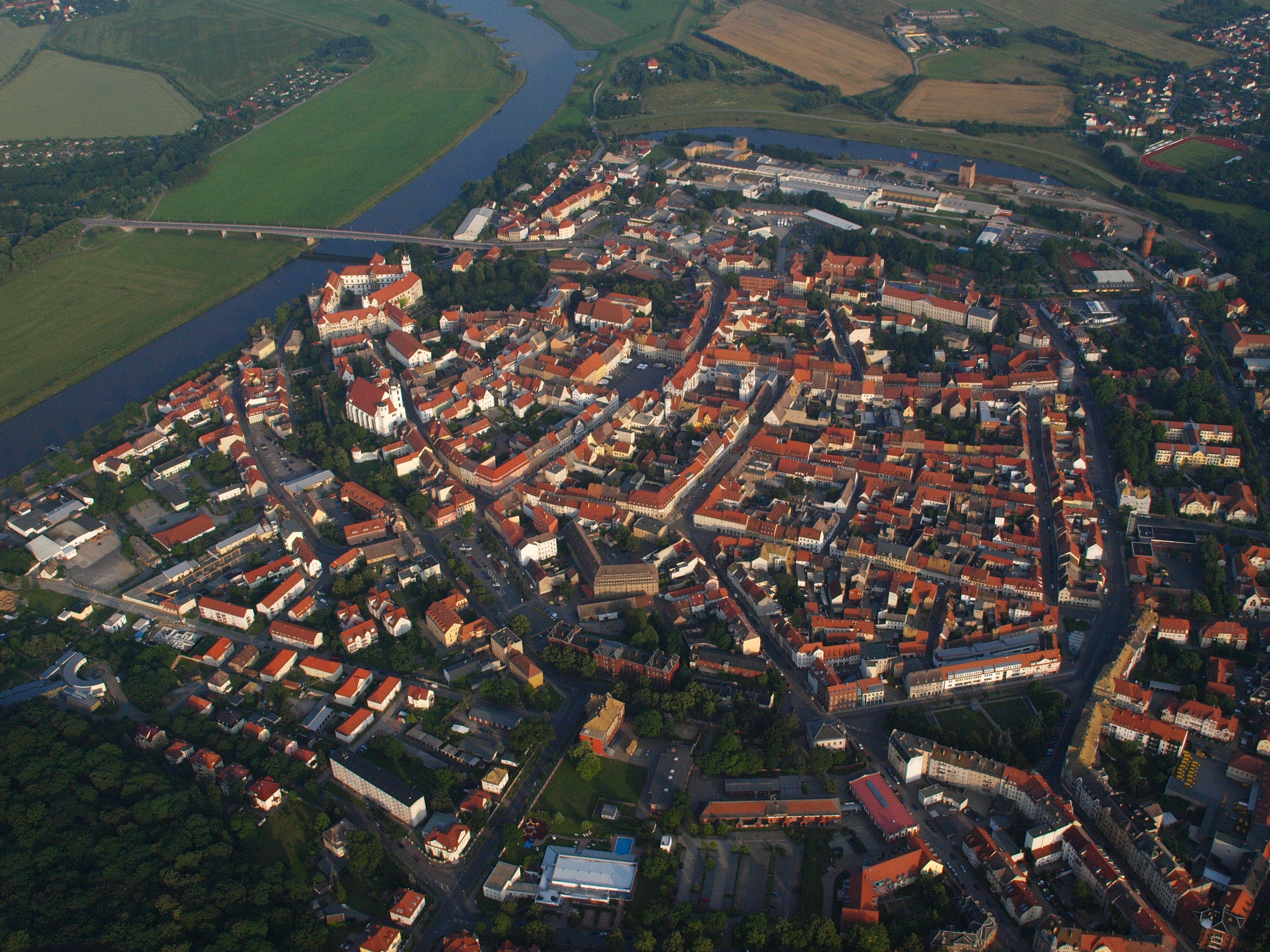
Torgau from the north-west

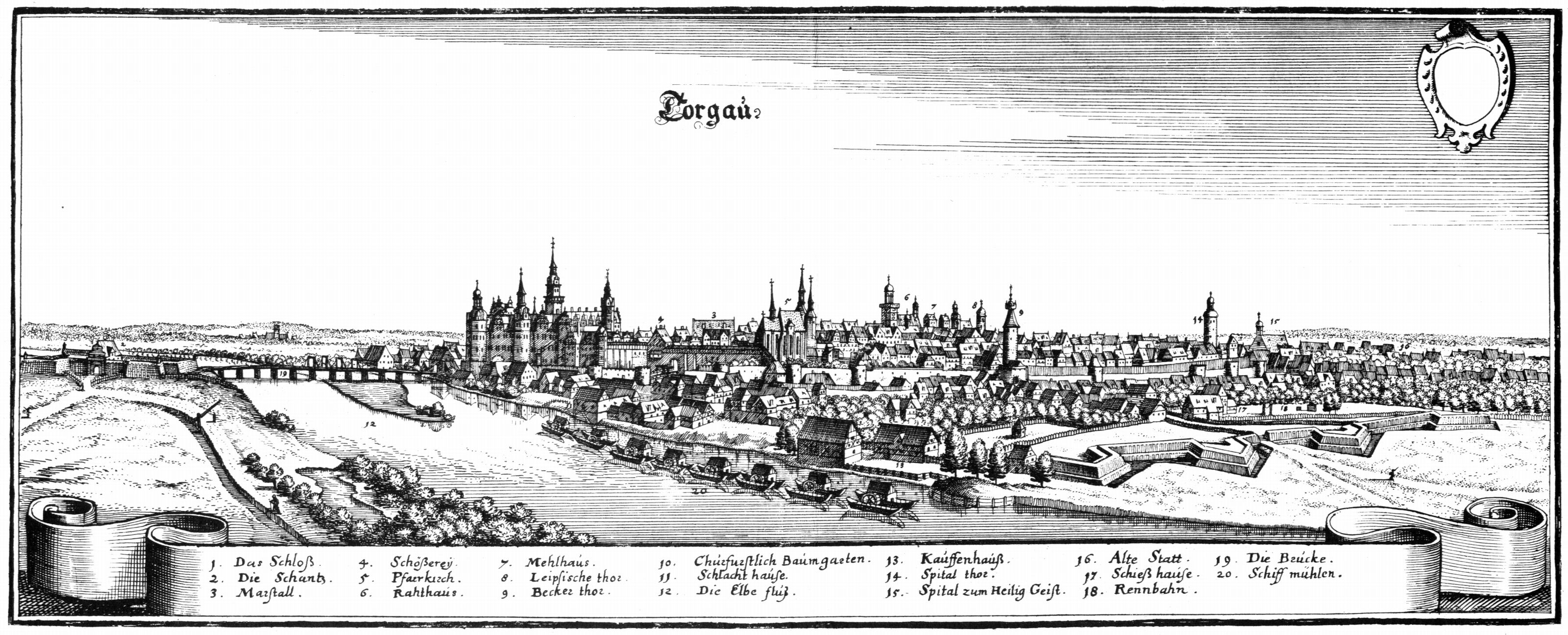
Engraving from Matthäus Merian from around 1650

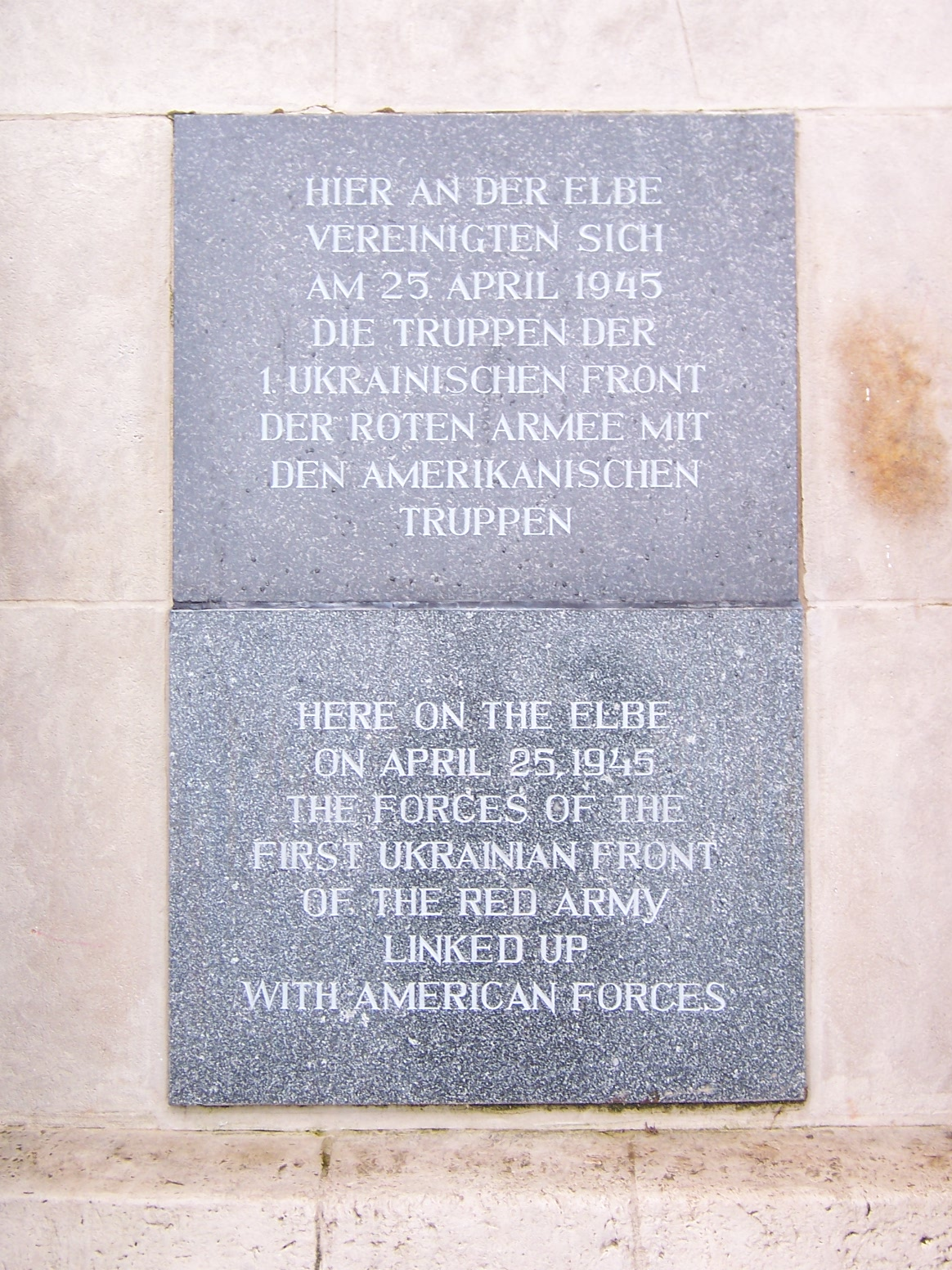
A commemorative plaque now stands where the "East Meets West" moment took place in Torgau on Elbe Day, 1945
