= Theodor Schreiber =

German archaeologist and art historian

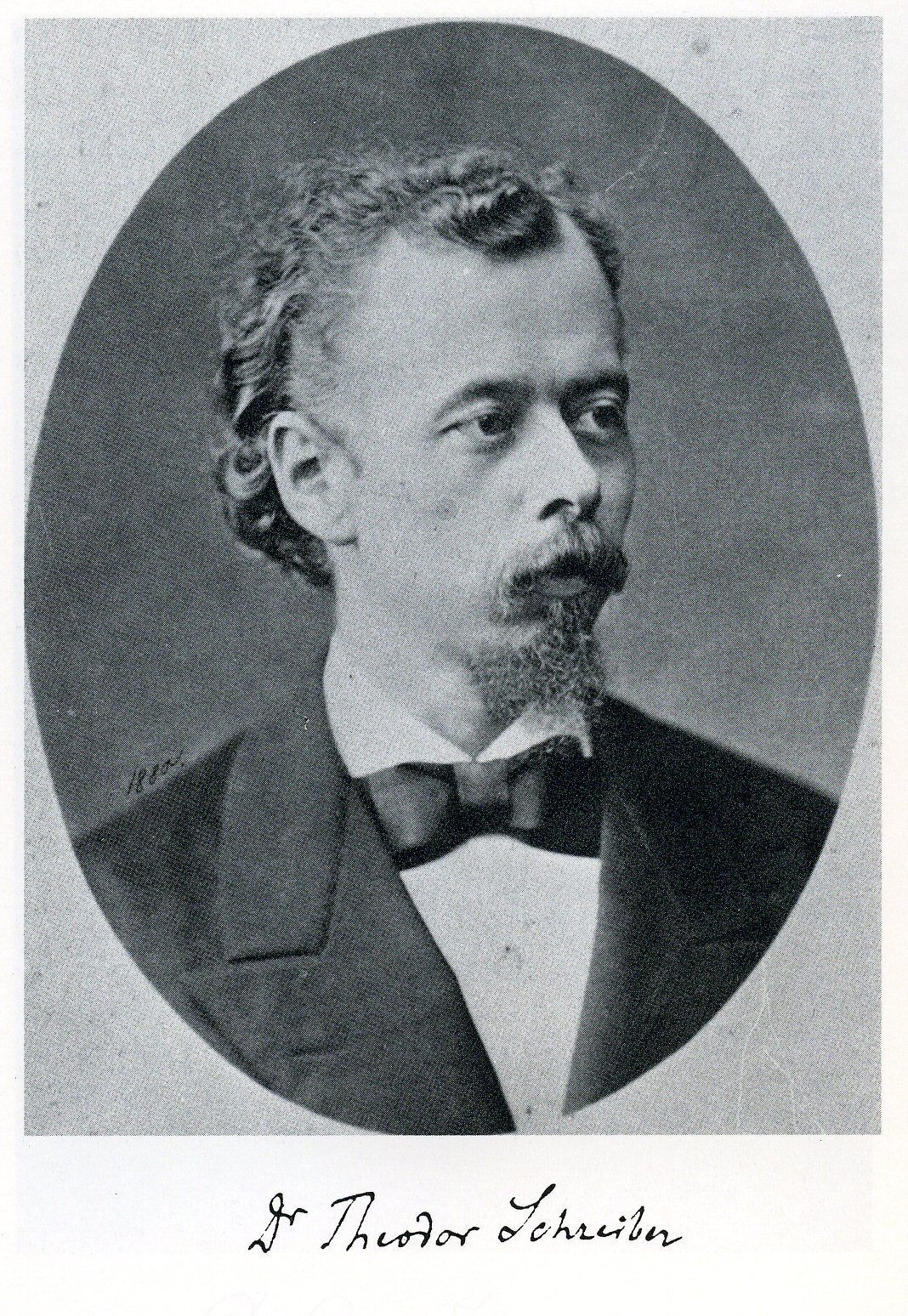
Theodor Schreiber

Georg Theodor Schreiber (13 May 1848, Strehla – 13 March 1913, Leipzig) was a German archaeologist and art historian.

From 1868 to 1872 he studied at the University of Leipzig, where he was a pupil of Johannes Overbeck. In 1874, by way of a travel stipend from the German Archaeological Institute, he traveled to Rome and studied under Wilhelm Henzen and Wolfgang Helbig. Afterwards, he continued his educational journey to Greece. In 1879 he obtained his habilitation for archaeology at Leipzig, where in 1885 he became an associate professor.

In 1885 he was appointed director of the Städtischen Museums der Bildenden Künste (Museum of Fine Arts) in Leipzig. From 1898 to 1902 he conducted archaeological work in Egypt as part of the "Ernst von Sieglin Expedition". In Alexandria he had the opportunity to examine the necropolis of Kom el-Shugafa.

== Selected works ==
- Apollon Pythoktonos. Ein beitrag zur griechischen religions- und kunstgeschichte, 1879 – Apollo Pythoctonos, a contribution to Greek religion and art history.
- Kulturhistorischer bilderatlas. I. Altertum (as editor), 2nd edition, 1888 – Translated into English in 1895 by William Cliffe Foley Anderson as: "Atlas of Classical Antiquities".
- Die wiener Brunnenreliefs aus Palazzo Grimani, 1888 – The Viennese fountain reliefs at Palazzo Grimani.
- Die alexandrinische toreutik; untersuchungen über die griechische goldschmiedekunst im Ptolemaeerreiche, 1894 – The Alexandrian toreutics; Studies of Greek goldsmiths in the Ptolemaic dynasty.
- Die Wandbilder des Polygnotos in der Halle der Knidier zu Delphi (first part), 1897 – The murals of Polygnotos in the Hall of the Cnidians at Delphi.
- Die Madonna. Das Bild der Maria in seiner kunstgeschichtlichen Entwickelung bis zum Ausgang der Renaissance in Italien (as editor of an Italian work by Adolfo Venturi) – The Madonna; the image of Mary in art historical development up until the advent of the Italian Renaissance.
- Studien über das bildniss Alexandera des Grossen, 1903 – Studies on the portrait of Alexander the Great.
- Griechische Satyrspielreliefs, 1909 – Greek satyr play reliefs.
