= Strehla =

- Town
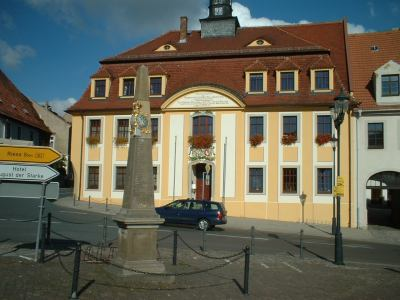

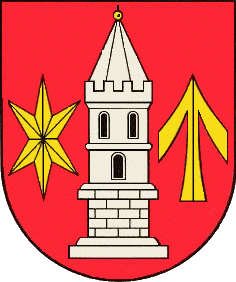
- Coat of arms

- Location of Strehla within Meißen district
- Interactive map of Strehla
- Location within Germany Location within Saxony
- Coordinates: 51°21′09″N 13°13′33″E
- Country: Germany
- State: Saxony
- District: Meißen
- Subdivisions: 7

Government
  - Mayor (2022–29): Jörg Jeromin (FW)

Area
  - Total: 30.28 km^{2} (11.69 sq mi)
- Elevation: 95 m (312 ft)

Population (2025-12-31)
  - Total: 3,632
  - Density: 119.9/km^{2} (310.7/sq mi)
- Time zone: UTC+01:00 (CET)
  - Summer (DST): UTC+02:00 (CEST)
- Postal codes: 01616
- Dialling codes: 035264
- Vehicle registration: MEI, GRH, RG, RIE
- Website: www.strehla.de

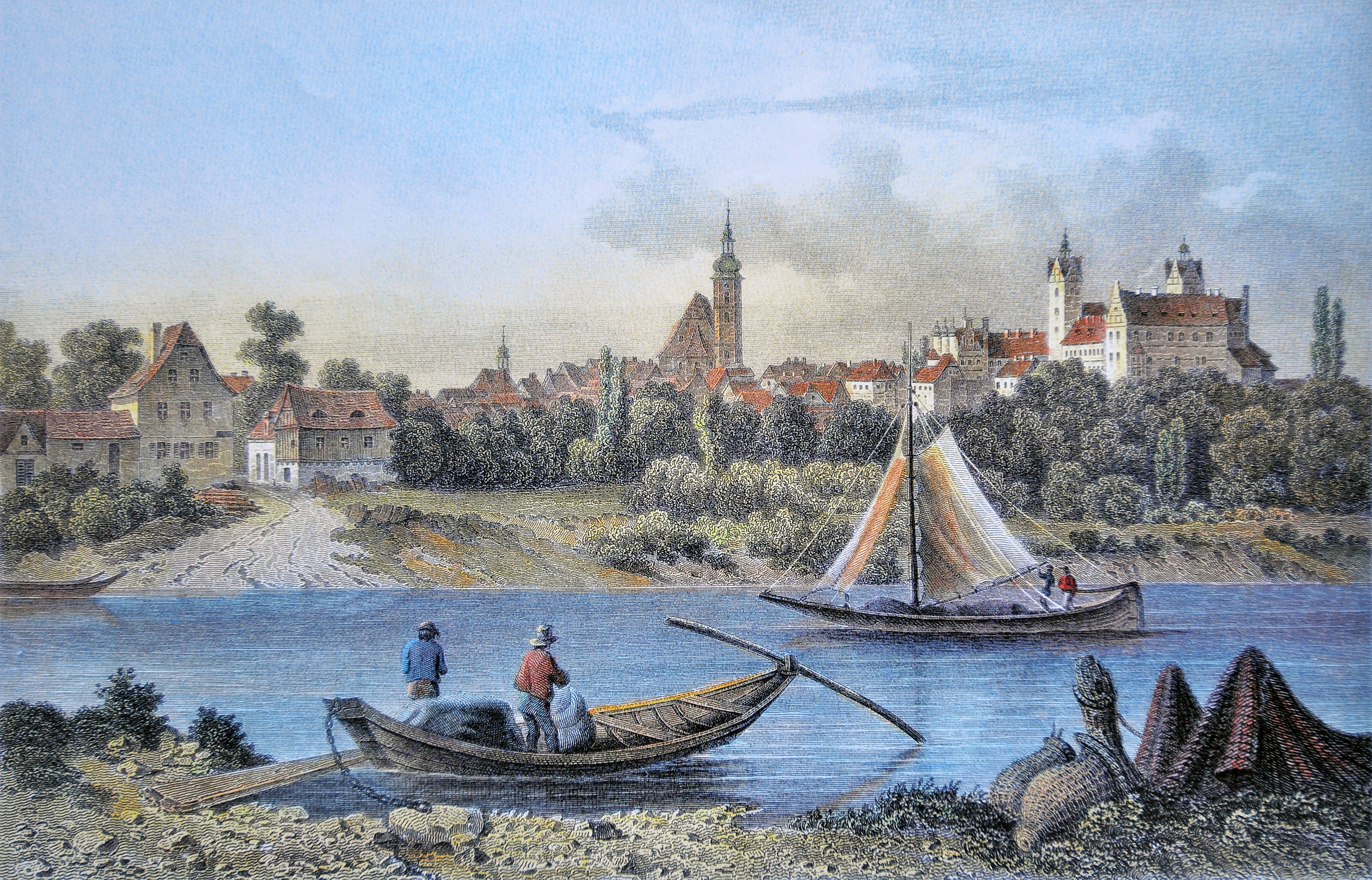
Schloss Strehla in 19th century

Strehla (German pronunciation: [ˈʃtʁeːla]; Upper Sorbian: Strjela, pronounced [ˈstʁʲɛla]) is a small town in the district of Meißen, Saxony, Germany. It is located on the river Elbe, north of Riesa. This place name means arrow in Sorbian. Strehla includes the following subdivisions:

- Forberge
- Görzig/Trebnitz
- Großrügeln
- Lößnig
- Oppitzsch
- Paußnitz
- Unterreußen

== History ==
Strehla was first mentioned in 1002, when its castle was set on fire by Polish King Boleslaw I, on his way back to Poland from a meeting with German King Henry; starting the German-Polish War of 1002–1018. During this war, Strehla went back and forth between Polish and German rule. It is situated on the Via Regia Lusatiae Superioris (Royal road of Upper Lusatia), which connected Görlitz to Leipzig. The castle of Strehla belonged to the Pflugk family from the 14th century until 1945. The Battle of Strehla between Austria and Prussia took place around the town during the Seven Years' War.

Strehla is also regarded as the point towards the end of World War II where troops of the Western Allies heading East first encountered Soviet troops heading West, at 11:30am on April 25, 1945, when Lieutenant Albert Kotzebue of the 69th Infantry Division (United States) encountered a Russian on horseback at nearby Leckwitz, later identified as a trooper of a Soviet Guards rifle regiment.

The later encounter on the same day at 4:40 p.m. in Torgau, about twenty miles to the north, would go into history books as the official link-up.

== Personalities ==
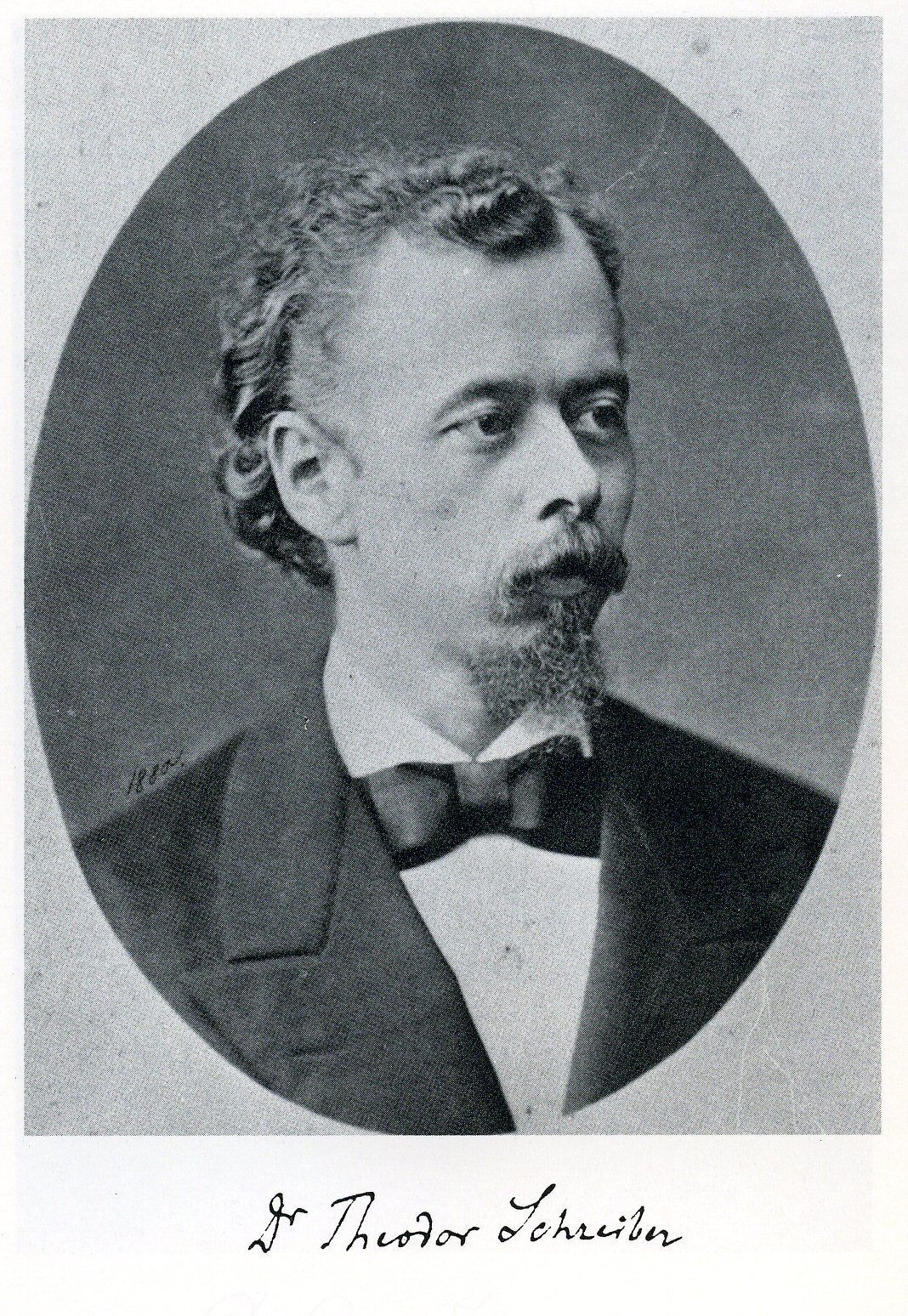
Theodor Schreiber 1876

- Theodor Schreiber (1848-1912), professor of archeology in Leipzig
- Werner Unger (1931-2002), soccer player
- Maximilian Arnold (born 1994), soccer player
