= John Senex =

English cartographer, engraver and explorer

- Born: 24 November 1678 (baptised); Ludlow, Shropshire, England
- Died: 30 December 1740 (aged 62); London
- Occupation: Cartographer

John Senex (baptised 24 November 1678 – died 30 December 1740) was an English cartographer, engraver and explorer.

He was also an astrologer, geologist, and geographer to Queen Anne of Great Britain, editor and seller of antique maps and most importantly creator of the pocket-size map of the world. He owned a business on Fleet Street in London, where he sold maps. He was born in Ludlow, Shropshire and died in London.

== Importance ==
He was one of the principal cartographers of the 18th century. He started his apprenticeship with Robert Clavell, at the Stationers Company, in 1692. Senex is famous for his maps of the world, some of which have added elevations, and which feature minuscule detailed engravings. Many of these maps can be found in museum collections; rarely, copies are available for private sale. Some copies are held in the National Maritime Museum; many of his maps are now in the possession of Trinity College Dublin. Having worked and collaborated with Charles Price, Senex created a series of engravings for the London Almanacs, and in 1714 he published together with Maxwell an English Atlas. In 1719 he published a miniature edition of Britannia by John Ogilby. He became particularly interested in depicting California as an island instead of part of mainland North America, a trait which makes many of his maps appealing to collectors. In 1721 he published a new general atlas. He used the work of cartographer Guillaume de L’Isle as an influence.

In the 1720s he produced a series of celestial charts in conjunction with Edmond Halley, using Halley's pirated edition of John Flamsteed's star catalogue.

In 1728 Senex was elected into the Fellowship of the Royal Society of London.

== Gallery ==
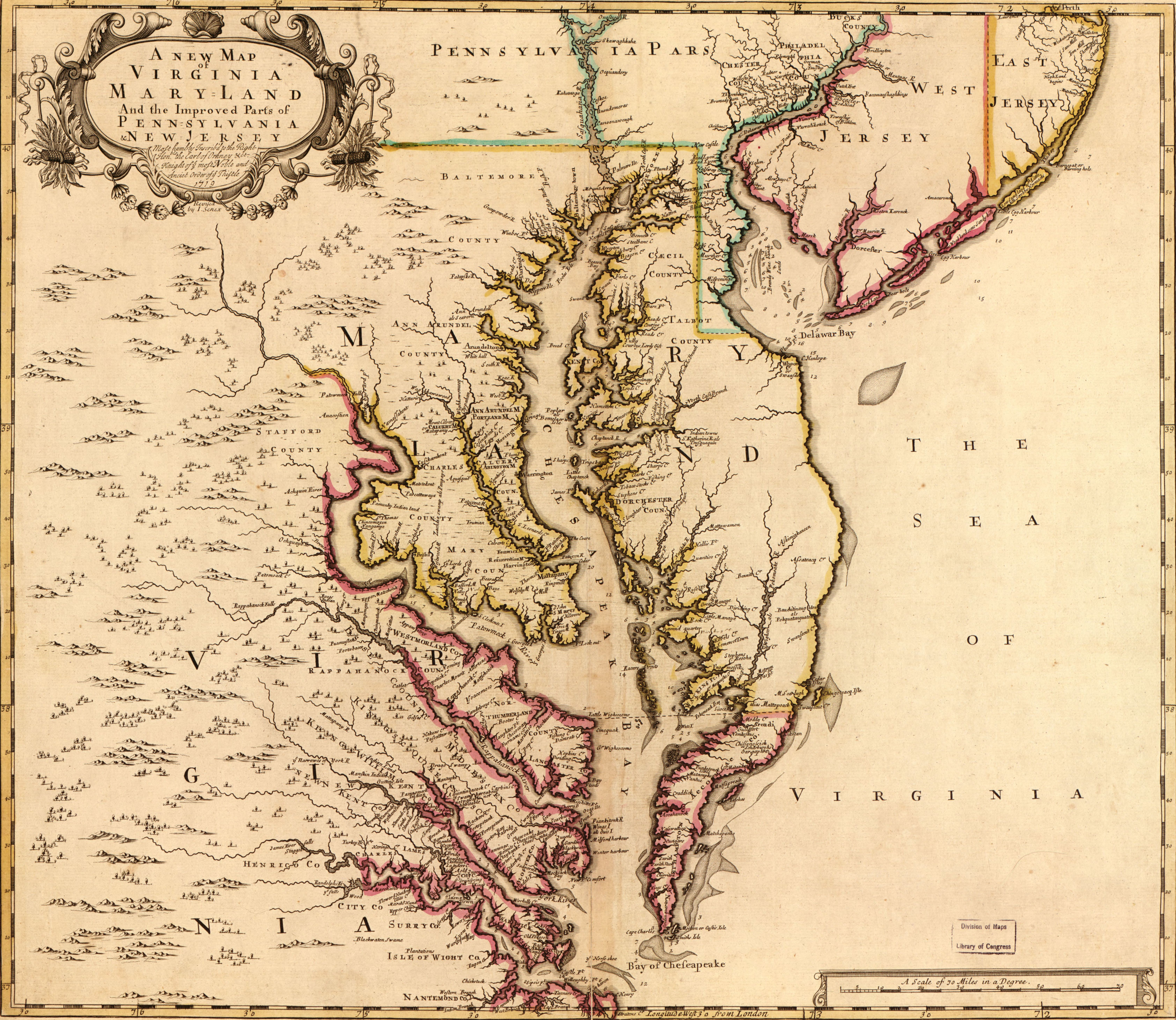
A new map of Virginia, Maryland and the improved parts of Pennsylvania & New Jersey, 1719

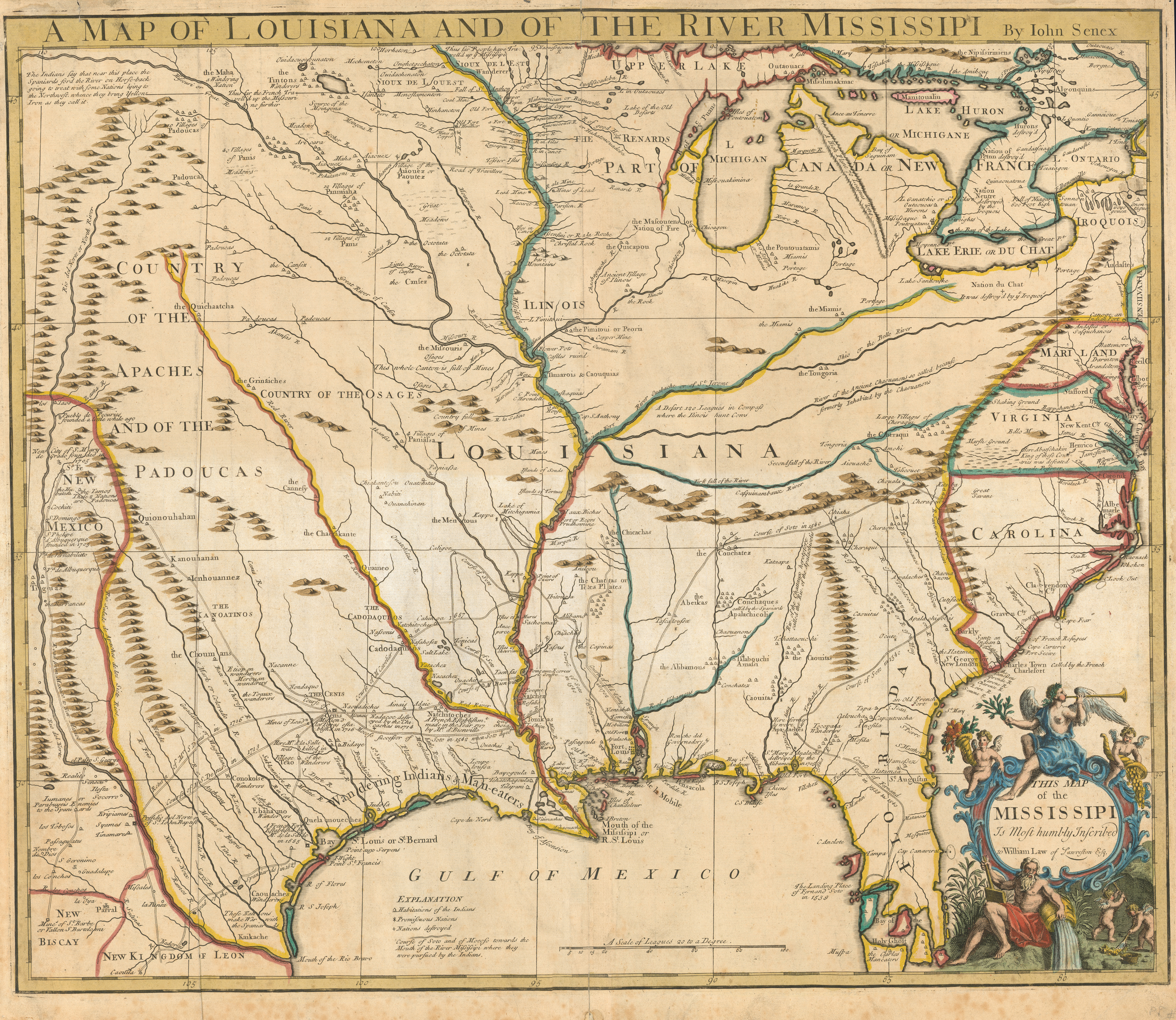
A map of Louisiana and the Mississippi River by John Senex (1721)

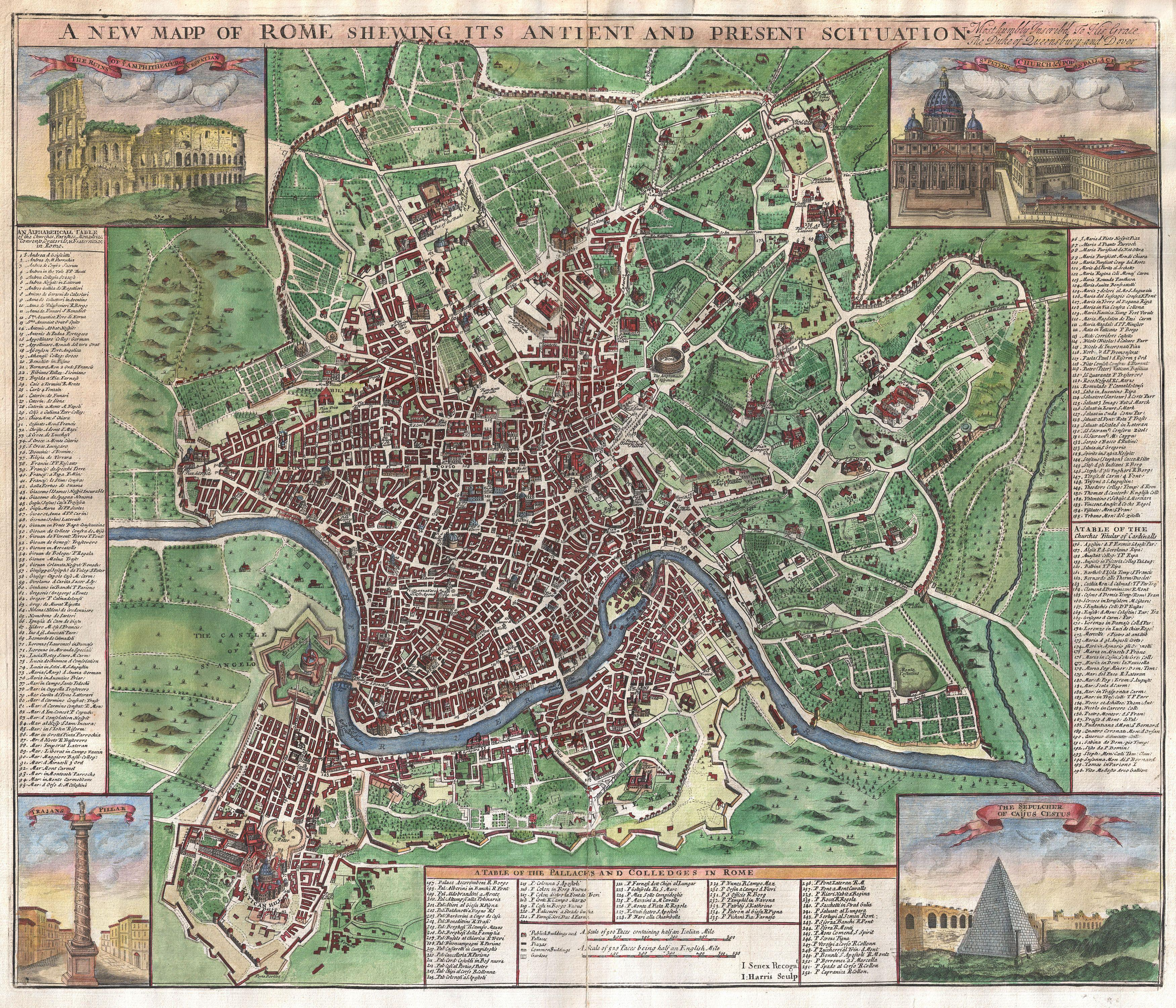
A map of Rome by Senex (1721)

== See also ==
- List of cartographers
- History of cartography
- Willem Blaeu
- Joan Blaeu
