= Raphael Holinshed =

16th-century English chronicler

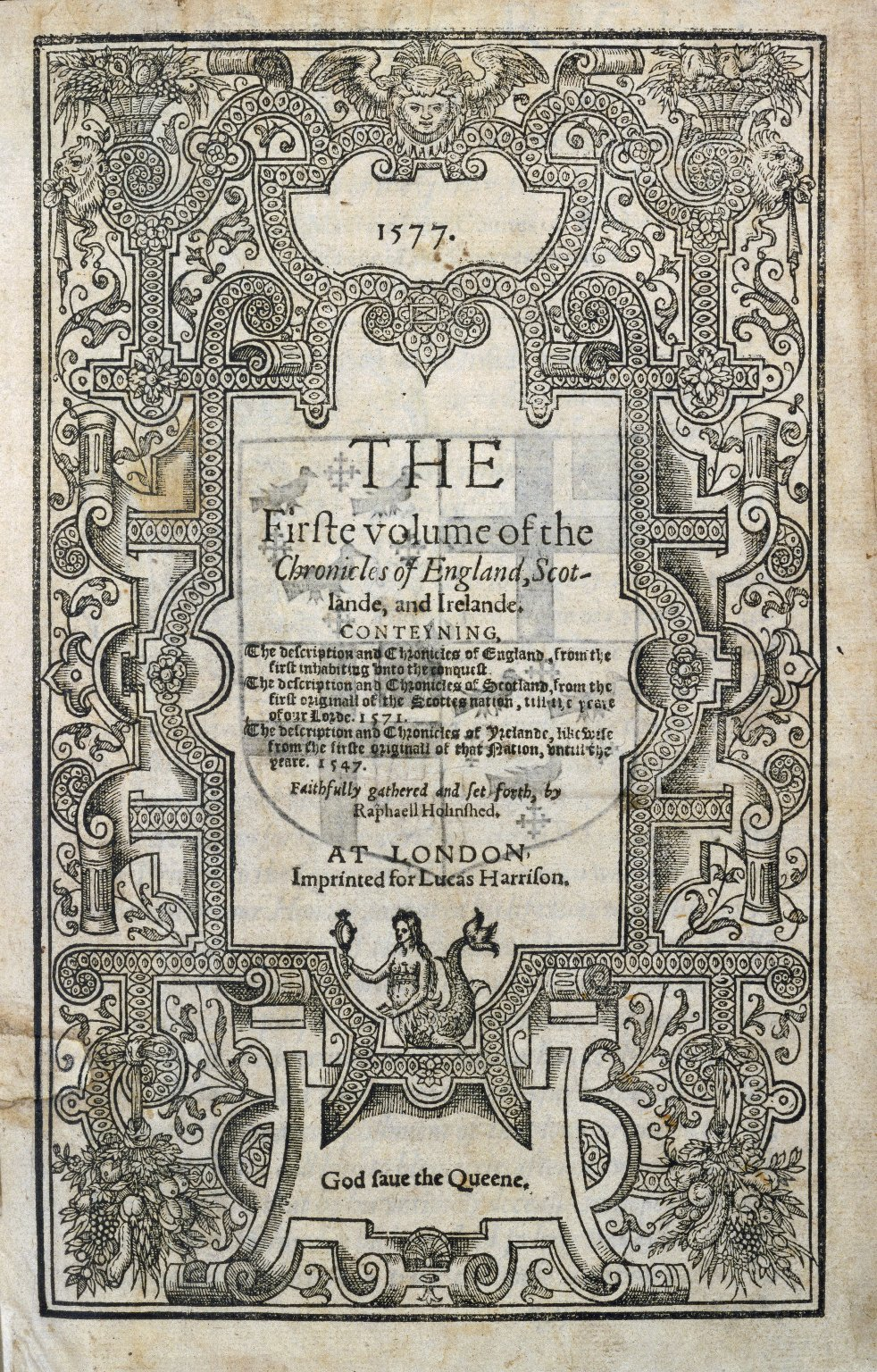
First edition of Holinshed's Chronicles

Raphael Holinshed (/ˈhɒlɪnʃɛd/; c. 1525 – before 24 April 1582) was an English chronicler, who was most famous for his work on The Chronicles of England, Scotlande, and Irelande. First published in 1577, a revised and extended 2nd edition was published in 1587. Commonly known as Holinshed's Chronicles, they have been called the "first complete printed history of England composed as a continuous narrative", and were a major influence on many Renaissance writers, such as Shakespeare, Spenser, Daniel and Marlowe.

== Biography ==
Little is known about Holinshed's life and for the most part his early years are primarily a matter of speculation. Holinshed was most likely born to Ralph Holinshed of Cophurst in Sutton Downes, Cheshire. The date of his birth is unknown. Holinshed is assumed to have received an education from student records from Christ's College in Cambridge, which show a student under the name Holinshed attending the college from 1544 to 1545. In his later years, he lived in London where he worked as a translator for the printer Reginald Wolfe. Wolfe gave him the project of compiling a world history from the Flood to the reign of Queen Elizabeth. Holinshed was only one contributor to this work; others involved in its production included George Bishop, John Hunne and Lucus Harrison.

Vernon Snow, an author who writes an introduction to Holinshed's Chronicles in the later edition, remarks that Holinshed was an experienced Cambridge-educated translator. As far as anyone knows, no other known works by Holinshed are available. A few months after the Chronicles had been licensed, Holinshed retired to the countryside in north east Warwickshire where he died around 1580 at Bramcote Hall near Warton. His will was proven on 24 April 1582, leaving his belongings and estate to a Mr. Burdet, whom he referred to as his master. Holinshed's Chronicles was published soon after his death.

== Holinshed's Chronicles ==
The idea for Holinshed's Chronicles was born from Reginald Wolfe. A London printer, Wolfe was one of the original members of the Royal Stationers' Company. In 1548, Wolfe conceived the idea of creating a "Universal Cosmography of the whole world, and there with also certain particular histories of every known nation". He wanted the work to be printed in English and he wanted maps and illustrations in the book as well. Wolfe acquired many of John Leland's works and with these he constructed chronologies and drew maps that were up to date. This took over 24 years of his life; however, when Wolfe realised he could not complete this project on his own, he hired Raphael Holinshed and William Harrison to assist him.

Wolfe died with the work still uncompleted in 1573, and the project, changed to a work about Britain (England and Scotland) and Ireland, was run by a consortium of three members of the London stationers. They kept Raphael Holinshed, who employed William Harrison, Richard Stanyhurst, Edmund Campion and John Hooker.

Both editions consisted of four books in two volumes. The first volume covered the history of England to the Norman Conquest, the history of Scotland to 1571, and the history of Ireland to 1541. The second volume was a history of England from William the Conqueror to "the present time". The second volume of the 1587 edition, also from William the Conqueror to the present time, was quickly withdrawn because it contained some passages that were considered offensive to the Queen and her ministers. The pages in question were removed by order of the Privy Council and a revised volume was published in 1588. The missing passages were separately published in 1723, and a complete reprint appeared in 1807. Holinshed's Chronicles was an "extremely popular work when it was first published," but "by the seventeenth century it was already considered outdated and inaccurate", losing its popularity and credibility.

Holinshed's Chronicles were highly circulated among the literate audience they were intended to reach. The Chronicles were cited around 1,400 times between the sixteenth and seventeenth centuries. Readers often wrote in the margins of the Chronicles. Records from inventories, wills, books lists indicate that the Chronicles were owned widely and across diverse social groups. A prominent group of owners were scholars and antiquaries. Readers often added notes that included their own thoughts and additional information.

== Renaissance writers inspired by Holinshed ==
=== Shakespeare ===
William Shakespeare used the revised second edition of the Chronicles (published in 1587) as the source for most of his historical plays, such as Richard III, the plot of Macbeth, and portions of King Lear and Cymbeline. According to Alison Taufer, "We care about the Holinshed Chronicles because Shakespeare read them". It is because of Shakespeare's writing that the public is educated on many important points in history. While dramatised, the innate messages behind the history are portrayed through the history plays. The Chronicles unclear dates are attributed to Shakespeare and his contemporaries comfort in manipulating the historical details utilised in their writing.

- King Lear – Holinshed's Chronicles goes into depth about Welsh king Llŷr from the 8th century BC, which accurately describes the plot of King Lear. The king's madness is Shakespeare's own creation; the rest of the play follows Holinshed's Chronicles closely, such as the emphasis on Cordelia's love for her father. In his writing of King Lear Shakespeare not only utilises Holinshed's Chronicles but incorporates British legend and folklore. Shakespeare also utilises the anonymous play King Leir from the 1590's as source material in addition to Holinshed. Shakespeare's version ends in tragedy most likely as a reflection on current political fears of his time. Holinshed's version ends with Lear returning to power. Though Shakespeare did not follow the exact history as that provided in the Chronicles he did follow the spirit of them.The added dramatics, however, are what make the play an effective popular piece of culture.
- Macbeth – Holinshed's Chronicles retells the story of Duncan of Scotland and his reign. It is now believed that King Duncan is based on a legend rather than an actual king. Holinshed's Duncan is characterised as a weak king with a "soft and gentle nature", while Macbeth is a cruel leader. Shakespeare, in contrast, gives Lady Macbeth a larger role in his play and included her sleepwalking habits and suicidal thoughts into his characterisation.

=== Marlowe ===
- Edward II – Like Shakespeare, Christopher Marlowe was greatly inspired by the Chronicles, particularly in Edward II. Details he borrows from the story include class issues and inheritance and details of Edward II's brutal murder at Berkeley Castle in Gloucestershire.

== Sources ==
- Stockard, Emily. "Raphael Holinshed". go-gale.com.
- Augustyn, Patricia; et, al. "Raphael Holinshed". Encyclopedia Britannica.
- "Holinshed's Chronicles, 1577". The British Library. Archived from the original on 4 April 2023.
- Holinshed, Raphael. "Chronicles of England, Scotland and Ireland, 1588". Google Books.
- Taufer, Alison (1999). Holinshed's Chronicles. New York: Twayne Publishers. pp. 135–137. ISBN 0805745815.
- Hadfield, Andrew (2016). The Oxford Handbook of English Prose, 1500-1640 (First ed.). Oxford University Press. pp. 310–325. ISBN 9780199580682.
- Cooper, Charles (1858). Athenae Cantabrigienses (Volume 1 ed.). Cambridge University Press. p. 431. ISBN 9780511700941.
- Clegg, Cyndia Susan (2015) [2004]. "Holinshed [Hollingshead], Raphael (c. 1525–1580?)". Oxford Dictionary of National Biography (online ed.). Oxford University Press. doi:10.1093/ref:odnb/13505. (Subscription, Wikipedia Library access or UK public library membership required.)
- Cooper, Charles Henry; Cooper, Thompson (2010) [1858]. Athenae Cantabrigiensis. Vol. 1. Cambridge: Cambridge University Press. doi:10.1017/CBO9780511700941. ISBN 9780511700941 – via Cambridge Core.
