= John Jugge =

English printer (died 1588)

- Died: 1588
- Occupation: printer

John Jugge (died 1588) was an English member of the Stationers' Company, and the son of Richard Jugge. Contrary to what is said in the Dictionary of National Biography, he did not take over Richard's business, such printing as he did being a sideline.
