= John Cawood (printer) =

English printer

John Cawood (1514–1572) was an English printer. He came of an old Yorkshire family of some substance and was apprenticed to John Reynes, who is best known as a bookbinder and who died in 1543 or 1544. In 1553 Cawood replaced Richard Grafton as Royal Printer. For his official salary of £6. 13s. 4d. per annum, Cawood was directed to print all "statute books, acts, proclamations, injunctions, and other volumes and things, under what name or title soever" in English, with the profit appertaining.

He was also granted the reversion of Reyner Wolfe's patent, authorized in 1547, for printing Latin, Greek and Hebrew books, for which he was to receive an additional 16s. 8d. per annum "and all other profits and advantages thereto belonging." He never enjoyed this reversion, for he died a year before Wolfe.

In 1553 Cawood seems to have acquired a certain amount of printing material from Steven Mierdman, who on the accession of Mary had been obliged to leave England. In that year a number of books printed by Cawood contain initials formerly used by Mierdman.

Upon the incorporation of the Stationers' Company in 1557, Cawood was one of the Wardens and he became Master in 1561, 1562 and 1566. During his lifetime Cawood was a great benefactor of the Company, though unfortunately his gifts perished in the Great Fire.

As Queen's Printer to Mary, Cawood was responsible for printing the proclamations and acts published during her reign, but on the accession of Elizabeth, the proclamation to that effect was printed by Richard Jugge, who subsequently printed several others and was termed in a letter from the Privy Council dated 20 December 1558, "the Quenes Majesties Prynter." On 25 January 1559, Cawood's name was conjoined with Jugge's in the printing of An Acte whereby certayne offences be made treason, and from that time they continued jointly to print the State papers.

Cawood died in 1572, and had been three times married. His device consisted of his mark and initials.
