= Ann Mearne =

- Occupation: Bookseller
- Years active: 1682-1693

Ann Mearne (sometimes spelled Mearn) was a bookseller who operated in Little Britain, London, from 1682 to 1693. She was part of an influential family of publishers and bookbinders.

== Life and career ==
Mearne ran her print shop in London from 1682–1693. She is thought to be the widow of Samuel Mearne and to have carried on his business after his death. She presented gifts to the stationers' company in his name, and continued to authorize high-level transactions on behalf of their shop.

Her son, Charles Mearne, was a bookseller, publisher, and probably a bookbinder who worked in Little Britain and the King's Arms. Her son and husband were part of a group referred to as the Queens' Binder for their high-caliber work.
