= Shane Tilton =

American academic

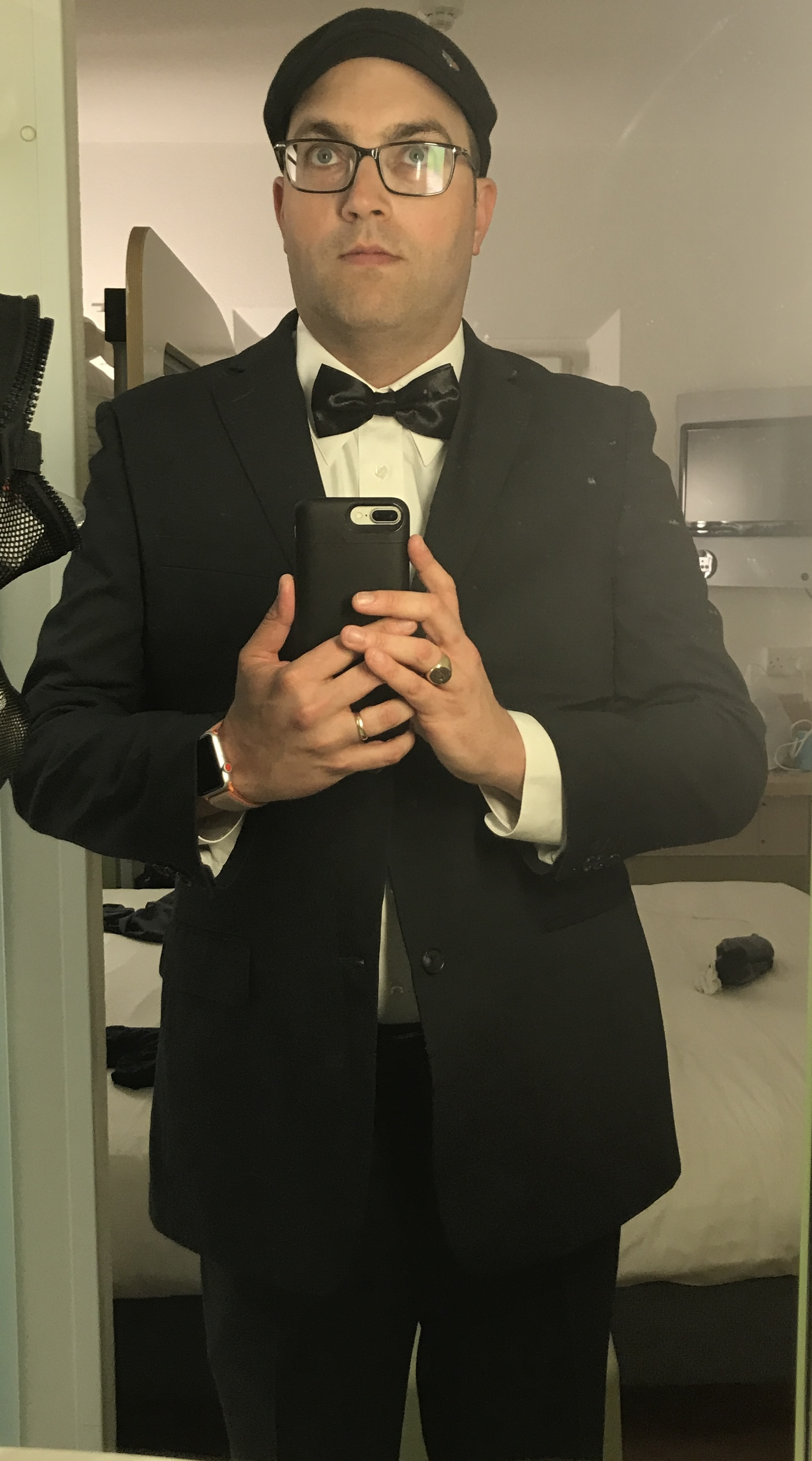
- Tilton in 2018
- Born: Zanesville, Ohio
- Education: Muskingum University (BA); Ohio University (MA); Ohio University (PhD)
- Occupations: Associate Professor of Writing and Multimedia Studies

Shane Tilton is an American academic and associate professor of multimedia journalism at Ohio Northern University. He was the former director of the Center of Society and Cyberstudies, which is an international thinktank designed to study and observe the impact of the Internet on society as a whole. He has published research and provided media commentary on the topics of the digital divide, new media, and celebrities. He has also published research on the impact the connected society has on government, the definition of the web, digital distribution. & social media's connection to the real world.

He has spoken more than 40 times at a variety of conferences and public forums. The most noted of these presentations was his presentation at SxSW regarding "nanocelebrites," a group of experts who use multiple communication platforms to deliver niche information and position themselves within the public sphere. Also, he discussed the three major areas that define a celebrity are content, personality, and reach. Tilton also spoke at SxSW in 2019 on a panel focusing on The Psychology of The Legend of Zelda.

In July 2018 Shane was awarded the Young Stationers' Prize, making him the sixth recipient of the Prize (following joint winners in 2016). In presenting the award, the judges recognised his "all-round contributions, not only in the educational sphere, but also with regard to the benefits for students in terms of training and support in preparing them for the professional world", as well as "the number of awards he has received, demonstrating his standing within both his academic subject and the broader industry".

On October 15, 2020, Tilton published The Journalism Breakdown, a textbook that explains the process of writing journalistic work in the era of multiple news platforms and various media publishing companies.

He was the chair of the "Two Year/Small College Interest Division" for the Broadcast Education Association from 2011 to 2013 and was the former chair of the "Communication and the Future" for the National Communication Association from 2009 to 2010.
