= William Seres =

English printer

William Seres (died c. 1579) was an English Protestant printer, starting work in about 1546, and working in partnership with John Day for a few years. Day and Seres specialized in religious works, such as those by Robert Crowley, which were largely related to theological controversies of the time. By 1550, Day and Seres were busy and successful enough to amicably separate their businesses.

Seres afterwards joined partnership for a time with the printer and translator Anthony Scoloker, and in 1553 received letters patent for the printing of psalters, primers and prayer-books. However, he lost this privilege after the accession of Queen Mary to the throne in July 1553, when the entire religious climate of the country changed. He seems to have sought safety on the Continent. His letters patent were renewed with the accession in 1558 of Elizabeth I.

In his old age he assigned his business for a yearly rental to Henry Denham who became a member of the Stationers' Company in 1560. Seres lived to be Master of the same Company for several years in succession, and died about 1579.

Seres' important work includes a 1549 edition of John Rogers' Matthew Bible, which was first printed in 1537 by Richard Grafton and Jacobus van Meteren as a mixture of the translations by William Tyndale and Miles Coverdale. Seres also printed Baldassare Castiglione's The courtyer ... done into Englyshe by Thomas Hoby in 1561.
