= Bonham Norton =

English printer and King's Printer (1565–1635)

Bonham Norton (1565 – 5 April 1635) was an English printer, publisher and King's Printer during the reign of James I. He also served as High Sheriff of Shropshire in 1611.

Norton was the only son of printer William Norton. He became a freeman of the Stationers' Company and later served as master of the company in 1613, 1626 and 1629. He held a patent with Thomas Wright for printing common-law books and subsequently became King's Printer. Surviving publications identify Norton and John Bill as printers to the king during the reign of James I.

Norton was also an alderman of London. He later retired to his property at Church Stretton, Shropshire, and served as sheriff of the county in 1611, the same year in which he received a grant of arms.

He married Jane, daughter of Thomas Owen of Condover, a judge of the Court of Common Pleas. Norton died on 5 April 1635 and was buried at St Faith's beneath Old St Paul's Cathedral, near his father. His widow later erected a monument to him in Condover church. The monument, dated 1641, depicts Norton and Jane together with members of the Owen family.
