= Richard Jugge =

English printer

Richard Jugge (died 1577) was an eminent English printer, who kept a shop at the sign of the Bible, at the North door of Old St Paul's Cathedral, though his residence was in Newgate market, next to Christ Church Greyfriars in London. He is generally credited as the inventor of the footnote. His business was run under the name of his widow Joan Jugge after he died.

== Life ==
It is thought that Richard Jugge was born in Waterbeach in Cambridgeshire and he was educated at Eton and King's College, Cambridge. He was admitted a freeman of the Stationers' Company in 1541 and began to print the New Testament in English, dated 1550. Joseph Ames in Typographical Antiquities says he was "very curious, in his editions of both the Old and New Testament, bestowing not only a good letter, but many elegant initial letters and fine wooden cuts." He was one of the original members of the Stationers' Company, of which he was chosen Warden in 1560, 1563 and 1566, and Master in 1568, 1569, 1573 and 1574. On the accession of Queen Elizabeth he became Royal Printer conjointly with John Cawood. He survived Cawood for a few years, in which he enjoyed the privileges of the patent alone, but he discovered that this was a heavy undertaking. With all the other work that flowed into his printing house from the patent, he found difficulty in organizing the production of Bibles. An octavo Testament took him two years to complete, and whereas Richard Grafton and Edward Whitchurch had issued seven folio Bibles in three years, Jugge managed only two in the same period. This rate of production was unsatisfactory to the Government and to the Church. After "long hearing and debating of grievances" Jugge was instructed to limit himself to the quarto Bible and to the Testament in sextodecimo.

One of Jugge's printer's devices consisted of a massive architectural panel adorned with wreaths of fruit, and bearing in the centre an oval, within which is a pelican feeding her young. On the left of the oval stands a female figure, having a serpent twined round her right arm, who is called on the tablet beneath her Prudencia, and upon the left is another female figure with a balance and a sword, called Justicia.

Jugge died in 1577, and his will was proved on 23 October that year. His business was carried on by his widow Joan Jugge [maiden name perhaps Joan Merrye], who continued the business until at least 1585 printing under her own name, dying in 1588. John Jugge who was Richard's son, appears to have inherited the rights to some titles but never printed independently.
