= John Reynes =

John Reynes (fl. 1527–1545) was a stationer, bookseller, publisher and bookbinder in London in the 16th century. He was born Jan Rijens at Wageningen, Gueldres, in the Low Countries, and was granted letters of denization on 7 June 1510.

Reynes's name first appears in the colophon of an edition of Ralph Higden's Polycronycon, issued in 1527, and he continued to publish books at intervals up to 1544. He is better known as a bookbinder and a number of stamped bindings are in existence which bear his device. They have, as a rule, on one side a stamp containing the emblems of the passion, and the inscription Redemptoris mundi arma, and on the other a stamp divided into two compartments containing the arms of England and the Tudor rose. His other stamps, about six in number, are rarer.

John Cawood, the printer, who was master of the Company of Stationers in 1557, was apprenticed to Reynes, and put up a window in his memory in Stationers' Hall.
