= William Nott (bookbinder) =

Bookbinder

William Nott was a 17th-century London bookbinder who has been tentatively identified as "Queen's Bookbinder A." Samuel Pepys reports in his diary in 1668 that he visited a bookbinder named Nott, likely William, and obtained a binding from him:

"...having sent for W. Howe to me to discourse with him about the Patent Office records, wherein I remembered his brother to be concerned, I took him in my coach with W. Hewer and myself towards Westminster; and there he carried me to Nott’s, the famous bookbinder, that bound for my Lord Chancellor’s library; and here I did take occasion for curiosity to bespeak a book to be bound, only that I might have one of his binding." (March 12, 1668/9)
