= Samuel Mearne =

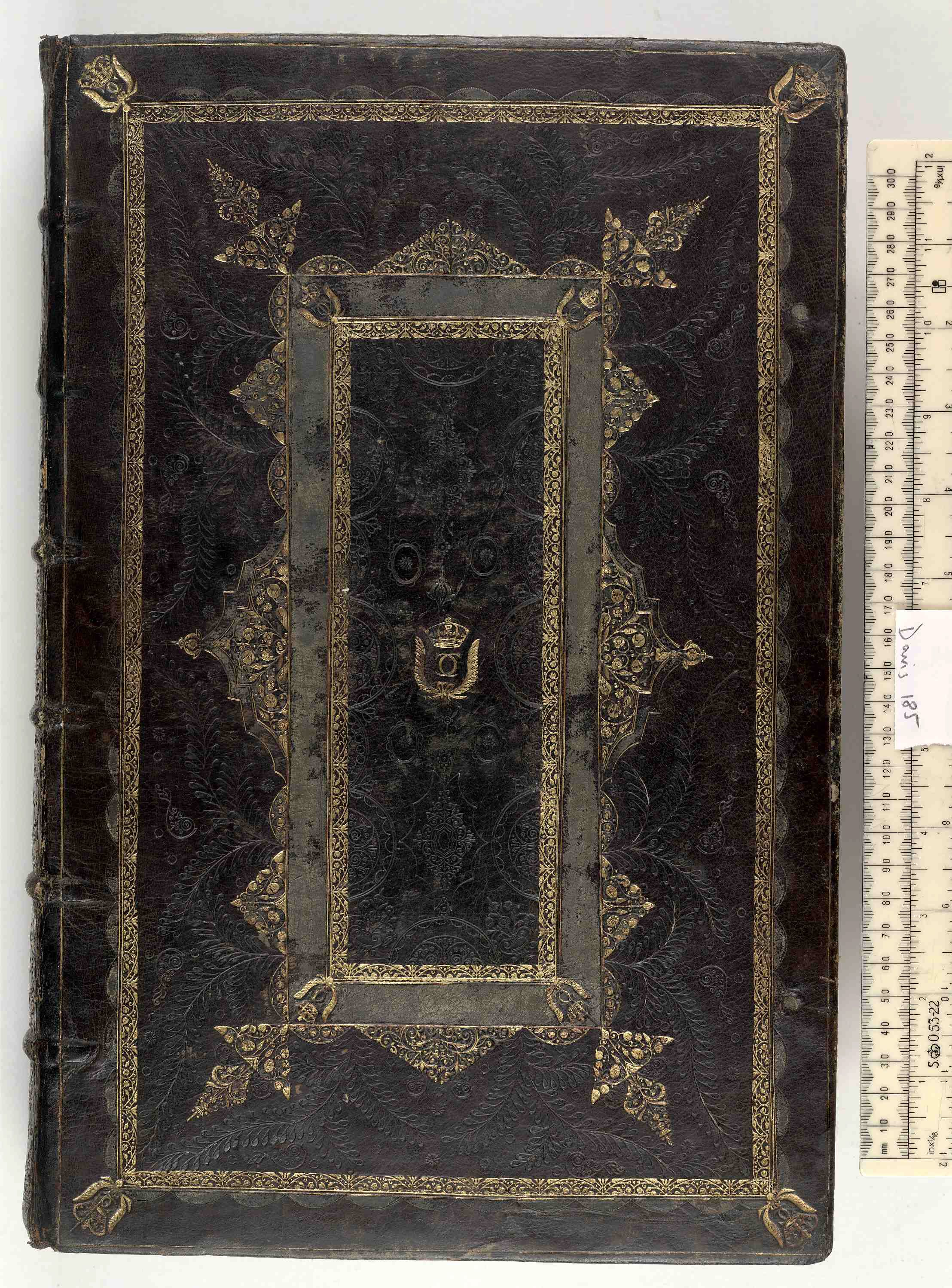
The upper cover of a Book of Common Prayer bound by Samuel Mearne

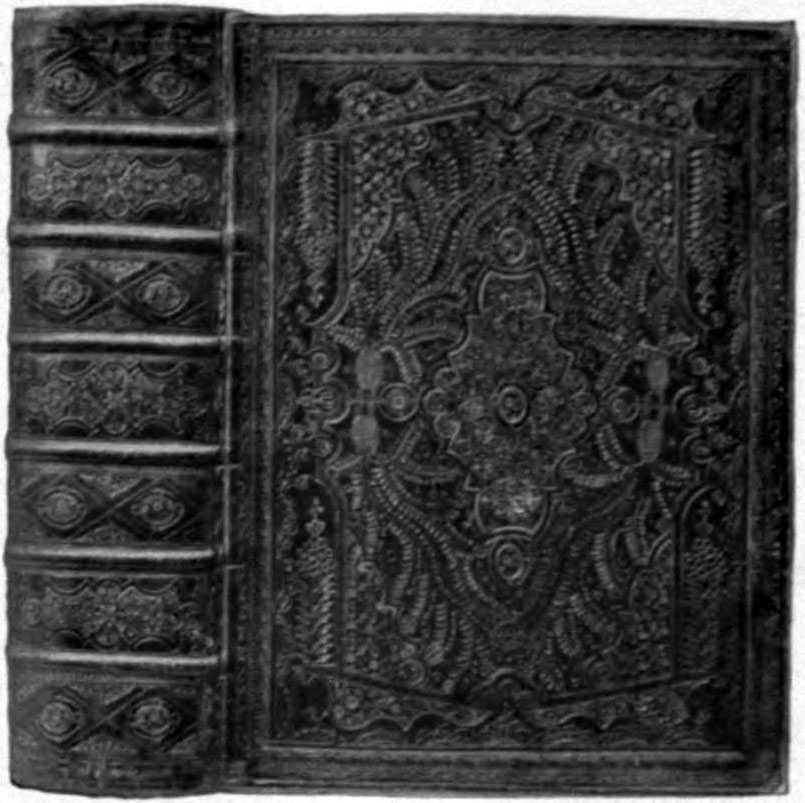
A Book of Common Prayer bound by Samuel Mearne

Samuel Mearne (20 April 1624 – May 1683) was an English Restoration bookbinder and publisher whose work is considered a high point of pre-industrial bookbinding. He and his sons, Charles and Samuel Jr., were one of the group referred to by historians as the Queens' Binder.

Mearne was born in Reading, England and lived all of his professional life in Little Britain in Aldersgate. He passed his apprenticeship in 1646 and set up as a bookseller and publisher. In 1655, he and two others went to the Netherlands, where he probably performed a service to Charles in exile, because he was named bookbinder to the king on 20 June 1660. He was also a part owner of the king's printing house, with John Bill and Christopher Barker. In 1668, Charles petitioned to have Mearne and others admitted to the Stationers' Company. In the Stationers' Company, Mearne would serve as warden and, later, master. In 1674, he became the stationer in ordinary to Charles, and the next year he and his son were made grants for life to their position.

The earliest surviving books bound by Mearne come from 1655, while many survive from his time as bookbinder to the king. His workshop produced beautiful gold tooled and onlay bindings for Charles and the royal libraries. For the chapels, gifts, and presentations of the installation of the Knight of the Garter ceremonies, Mearne's shop produced even more lavishly bound books. Many other binderies in London and elsewhere made similar luxurious bindings in the style of the day, and attributions of bindings to Mearne in older catalogues should be treated with caution.

Professionally, Mearne was popular with other publishers for his work at hunting down illegal presses. While he did not perform the binding himself, personally, after his appointment, he oversaw the production and designs of his books.

Samuel Mearne, Sr., died in 1683, with his son, Charles, dying in 1686, and Samuel Mearne, Jr. taking over the shop and appointments until the Glorious Revolution in 1689.

In 1967 Howard Millar Nixon, who held the Sandars Readership in Bibliography, celebrated the work of Mearne.

== See also ==
- Ann Mearne
