= Angela Clarke (author) =

British author, columnist, and playwright

- Born: 1980 or 1981 (age 45–46)
- Education: University of Essex; Royal Academy of Dramatic Art
- Occupations: Author; columnist; playwright
- Spouse: Sam Williams
- Website: angelaclarke.co.uk

Angela Clarke is a British author, columnist, and playwright who has written for Cosmopolitan, Daily Mail, The Guardian, The Independent, The Vagenda, and The Wharf. She wrote Daily Mail's anonymous column "Confessions of a Fashionista", recounting her experience working as an agent in the fashion industry. In 2013, she revealed her identity when she published a memoir of the same name. Her debut play The Legacy premiered in June 2015 and her first fictional crime novel Follow Me was released in December 2015.

== Education ==
Clarke is from St Albans, a city in Hertfordshire, England, and grew up in Redbourn and Watford, attending Redbourn Junior School and Roundwood Park School in Harpenden. She studied English and European literature at the University of Essex and completed the "Advances in Scriptwriting" course at the Royal Academy of Dramatic Art.

== Career ==
Clarke is an author, columnist, and playwright who has written for Cosmopolitan, Daily Mail, The Guardian, The Independent, The Vagenda, and The Wharf. She has written The Wharf's "Blonde's Eye View" column since 2003.

Prior to becoming a writer, she worked as a creative agent in the fashion industry for ten years. Daily Mail published her anonymous column "Confessions of a Fashionista", in which she wrote about her experience working in the industry. Clarke revealed her identity and true account with the release of her best-selling memoir of the same name, which was published by Virgin Books in January 2013.

Chugging for Kittens, Clarke's single-scene playlet about two people collecting donations for a cat charity, premiered in 2015. Her debut full-length play The Legacy, which is set in Harpenden, premiered at Islington's Hope Theatre in June 2015. The comedy drama is about a feminist activist living in the suburbs. In July 2015, Clarke was awarded the Young Stationers' Prize for "achievement and promise in writing and publishing". She signed a two-book deal with Avon, an imprint of HarperCollins, in October 2015.

Her debut fictional crime novel Follow Me was released in December 2015. Its narrative includes the "Hashtag Murderer", an Internet troll who leaves clues online about possible victims. Clarke has been a victim of online harassment herself, especially after writing an article about feminism for The Guardian. The book sold more than 12,000 copies in the first three weeks and reached number 43 on the paperback fiction chart. In January 2016, Clarke hosted the book's launch event at Waterstones in St Albans. That same month, Follow Me was named Amazon.com's "Debut of the Month". Clarke was longlisted for the Crime Writers Association's 2016 Dagger in the Library Award, and Follow Me was short listed for the Dead Good's "Papercut Award for Best Page Turner". Her book Watch Me is scheduled to be published in January 2017.

In addition to writing, Clarke works as a reader for The Literary Consultancy and is a public speaker. In 2013, she discussed her book Confessions of a Fashionista at the inaugural St Albans Fashion Week (SAFW). She returned to SAFW the following year to host the VIP dinner event "Sharing a taxi with Alexander McQueen and other stories". In 2014, she participated in "A Girls' Night Out" alongside three women's fiction novelists as part of the inaugural St Albans Literary Festival. She was on the festival's "Killer Women Crime Fiction Panel" in 2016. In September 2016, she was a panellist at the crime writing festival Noirwich and participated in the School of Logical Progression's (Royal Society of Arts) "Meet a Mentor Programme".

== Personal life ==
Clarke is married to economist Sam Williams.

In April 2012, Clarke was diagnosed with Ehlers–Danlos syndrome (EDS) III, an inherited connective tissue disorder caused by a defect in the structure, production, or processing of collagen or proteins that interact with collagen. She has said about her disorder: "My condition has made me look at things in a different way. But it is also a good thing because I'm white, middle class and live in St Albans, I'm comfortable – all things that make me pretty standard, and having a disability makes me other, and gives me different viewpoint on things and that's a good thing when you are writing."

== List of works ==
=== Books ===
- Confessions of a Fashionista: The Good, the Bad and the Botox (2013)
- Follow Me (2015)
- Watch Me (2017)

=== Plays ===
- Chugging for Kittens (2015), a one-scene playlet
- The Legacy (2015)
