= Richard Royston =

English bookseller and publisher (1601–1686)

Richard Royston (1601 in Oxford – November 1686) was an English bookseller and publisher, bookseller to Charles I, Charles II and James II.

== Life ==
Royston, the son of an Oxford tailor Richard Royston and Alice Tideman, was admitted a freeman of the Stationers' Company in 1627. In the 1630s he published work by John Donne and Thomas Heywood. His own anti-Parliament pamphlet Pro-quiritatio was suppressed in 1642, and Royston began publishing the work of high-Anglicans like Jeremy Taylor and Henry Hammond.

Royston was charged by John Wright, parliamentary printer, on 31 July 1645, as being the "constant factor for all scandalous books and papers against the proceedings of parliament". Royston was confined to the Fleet prison, and petitioned on 15 August for release. In 1646 he published Francis Quarles's Judgment and Mercie for afflicted Soules, and wrote and signed the dedication addressed to Charles I. In 1648 appeared, "printed for R. Royston in Ivie Lane", the first edition of Είκών Βασιλική, of which about fifty impressions were issued in six months. On 23 May 1649 Royston had entered to him in the register of the Company of Stationers "The Papers which passed at Newcastle betwixt his sacred Majesty and Mr. Henderson concerning the change of church government". He was examined in October 1649 for publishing a "virulent and scandalous pamphlet", and bound in sureties to "make appearance when required and not to print or sell any unlicensed and scandalous books and pamphlets". He came before the council of state again in 1653 for a similar offence. On 29 November 1660 Charles granted to him the monopoly of printing the works of Charles I, in testimony of his fidelity and loyalty, and "of the great losses and troubles he hath sustained in the printing and publishing of many messages and papers of our said Blessed Father, especially those most excellent discourses and soliloquies by the name of Είκών Βασιλική [or Eikon Basilike]". On 6 May 1663 Charles II took the unusual course of addressing a letter to the Company of Stationers to request the admission as an assistant of "Mr. R. Royston, an ancient member of this company and his Majesty's bookseller, but not of the livery". As king's bookseller Royston caused the stock of Richard Alleine's Vindiciæ Pietatis (1664, &c.) to be seized in 1665 for being published without license, but afterwards purchased the stock as waste-paper from the royal kitchen, bound the copies, and sold them. For this he was reprimanded by the privy council. Royston had a further proof of the goodwill of the king on 29 September 1666, when he had a grant of £300 in compassion for losses sustained in the late fire.

"Orthodox Roystone", as John Dunton called him, was master of the Company of Stationers in 1673 and 1674, and bequeathed plate to the company. He died in 1686 in his eighty-sixth year, and was buried in Christ Church, Newgate Street. An inscription in the south aisle of the church describes him as "bookseller to three kings", and also commemorates his granddaughter Elizabeth and daughter Mary (d. 1698), who married the bookseller Richard Chiswell the elder.
