= Reginald Wolfe =

English printer (died 1573)

Reginald (or Reyner) Wolfe (died 1573) was a Dutch-born English Protestant printer and one of the original members of the Royal Stationers' Company.

== Life ==
Wolfe was born in Druten in the Netherlands. A learned and devout Protestant, he settled in England some time before 1530 and established himself as a bookseller at St. Paul's Churchyard, London. Wolfe began to print in 1542. He was the first printer in England to maintain a large stock of Greek type. Edward VI made him Royal Printer in Latin, Greek and Hebrew and awarded him an annuity of 26s. 8d. for life. Despite his Protestantism, Mary I made him one of the original members of the Stationers' Company. Under Elizabeth I, he served as Master of the Company in 1559, 1564, 1567 and 1572.

Wolfe published works by Archbishop Cranmer, the antiquarian John Leland, Robert Recorde and Archbishop Parker. In 1548, he conceived a project for a "Universal Cosmography of the whole world, and therewith also certain particular histories of every known nation." He hired Raphael Holinshed and William Harrison to assist in the task, but it remained unfinished at Wolfe's death in 1573. Much of the material was published by Holinshed in 1577 as The Chronicles of England, Scotland and Ireland (usually known as Holinshed's Chronicles).

== Family ==
Wolfe married Joan (died 1574), who briefly ran his business after his death. The family included sons John and Robert, a daughter who married John Harrison, another bookseller, and Elizabeth who married Stephen Nevinson.

== See also ==
- Pierce the Ploughman's Crede
