= John Baskett =

English printer

John Baskett (1664/5–1742), was the King's Printer for England. His sons, Thomas and Robert, and grandson by the latter, Mark, were also engaged in the press. By purchasing reversion of the King's Printer position, Baskett kept it in the family for the following generation.

== History ==
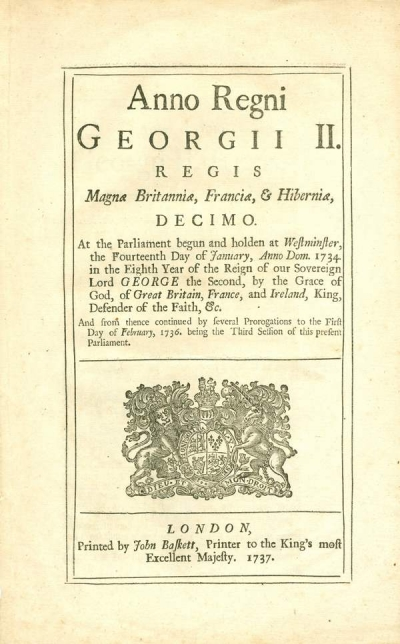
First page of the Licensing Act 1737 that established the office of Examiner of Plays, printed by John Baskett.

John Baskett is believed to have been the person of that name who addressed a petition to the Treasury praying that since he was 'the first that undertook to serve his Majtie with parchment cartridges for his Majties fleet, by which meanes he saved his Majtie severall thousand pounds,’ he might be appointed 'one of the Comrs, Comptroller or Receiver,’ being 'places to be disposed of by the late duty upon paper, &c.'.

The petition was not dated; but it must have been written about 1694, as the Stamps Act 1694 (5 & 6 Will. & Mar. c. 21) – the act for duties on vellum, paper, &c. – was passed on 24 April. The origin of the bible-patent dates from Christopher and Robert Barker, in whose family it remained down to 1709. The patent was then held by Thomas Newcomb and Henry Hills, from whose executors John Baskett and some others, purchased the remainder of their term.

In 1713, Benjamin Tooke and John Barber were constituted Queen's Printers, to commence after the expiration of the term purchased by Baskett, that is, thirty years from 1709, or January 1739.

Baskett bought from Tooke and Barber their reversionary interest, and obtained a renewal of sixty years, the latter thirty of which were subsequently conveyed by the representatives of the Baskett family to Charles Eyre and his heirs for £10,000.

A new patent was granted in 1799 to George Eyre, Andrew Strahan, and John Reeves; it has been renewed, and has come in course of time into the hands of its present possessors, Messrs. Eyre & Spottiswoode.

== Book of Common Prayer ==
The first Bible printed by 'the assigns of Newcomb and Hills' appeared in 1710, and the name of John Baskett was first added to theirs upon a New Testament in 1712. Baskett began to print the Book of Common Prayer in the following year, when he brought out editions in quarto, octavo, and 12mo. He was made master of the Company of Stationers in 1714 and again in 1715. Four editions of the Bible (folio, quarto, octavo, and duodecimo) appeared with his imprint in 1715. His next publication was an edition in two volumes, imperial folio, printed at Oxford (the Old Testament in 1717 and New Testament in 1716), a work of great typographical beauty, styled by Dibdin 'the most magnificent' of the Oxford Bibles. It is known as 'The Vinegar Bible,’ from an error in the headline of St. Luke, ch. xx., which reads 'The parable of the vinegar,’ instead of ‘The parable of the vineyard.’ It is so carelessly printed that it was at once named 'A Baskett-full of printers' errors'. The large-paper copies contain frontispiece by Du Bosc and vignettes, &c., by Vandergucht.

Three copies on vellum have been traced: one in the British Museum, one in the Bodleian Library, and a third formerly at Blenheim, which fetched 255l. at the Sunderland sale in 1881. Daniel Prince, writing on 4 June 1795, says: 'Great care was taken to preserve the waste of that book, and indeed of some few others of Basket's printing worth preserving. About the year 1762 all Basket's stock, &c., was removed to London; and I have often procured sheets of that Bible and also of the beautiful octavo Common Prayer Book, which were almost his only shining examples of paper and print'.

Dr. John Lee, who calls Baskett 'one of the greatest monopolists of bibles who ever lived,’ describes at length his Scotch lawsuits, commencing in 1715. In a vigorous pamphlet ('A Previous View of the Case between John Baskett, Esq., one of his Majesty's Printers, Plaintiff, and Henry Parson, Stationer, Defendant,’ Edinburgh, printed by James Watson, one of his majesty's printers, 1720, 4to), probably written by Watson himself, it was contended that, as king's printer for Scotland, he had the right, under the Act of Union, of printing the Bible and of selling it anywhere in the United Kingdom. Baskett claimed the privilege of printing bibles and of selling them in Scotland, while he prosecuted Henry Parson, Watson's agent, for selling in England bibles produced in Edinburgh. The litigation continued until it was settled by a judgment of Lord Mansfield in favour of Baskett. The imprint of James Watson may be seen in bibles printed at Edinburgh during 1715, 1716, 1719, and 1722. In 1726 the name of John Baskett appears on an Edinburgh edition.

In 1731 the press syndics of the University of Cambridge leased their privilege of printing bibles and prayer-books for eleven years to W. Fenner, who, with the brothers James, was in partnership with William Ged for carrying into operation stereotype printing invented by the latter. Ged describes at length the intrigues of the king's printer (Baskett) with his own partners, with a view to damage the success of the innovation. Baskett shortly afterwards became bankrupt, and in 1732 his assignees filed a bill in chancery against W. Fenner and the university of Cambridge for printing bibles and prayer-books. The case came on again in August 1742, and was ultimately decided in the court of King's Bench, 24 November 1758, in favour of the university. About the year 1738 Baskett's printing-office was burnt; and, as was the custom on such occasions, he was helped through his losses by gifts from his brethren of presses and money. The name of John Baskett is last seen on a 12mo New Testament of 1742. He died on 22 June of that year. His sons Thomas and Robert printed the Old Testament in 1743. The name of Thomas alone appears on bibles after 1744, and the imprint so continued down to 1769. He issued editions of the Prayer Book between 1746 and 1757. We find that 'Mark Baskett and the assigns of Robert Barker' printed two quarto bibles at London in 1761 and 1763, and a folio prayer-book, 1760. With the name of Mark Baskett is connected a remarkable bibliographical mystery. Isaiah Thomas, our chief authority for the history of printing in North America, assures us that 'Kneeland and Green' printed [at Boston about 1752], principally for Daniel Henchman, an edition of the Bible in small 4to. This was the first Bible printed in America in the English language.

'It was carried through the press as privately as possible, and had the London imprint of the copy from which it was reprinted, viz. "London: printed by Mark Baskett, printer to the king's most excellent majesty," in order to prevent a prosecution.' Thomas had often heard the story told when an apprentice. 'The late Governor Hancock was related to Henchman, and knew the particulars of the transaction. He possessed a copy of this impression,' of which between seven and eight hundred are said to have been struck off. Thomas also states that two thousand copies of a duodecimo New Testament had also been printed at Boston by Rogers & Fowle in the same disguised manner. 'Both the Bible and Testament were well executed.' 'Zechariah Fowle, with whom I served my apprenticeship, as well as several others, repeatedly mentioned to me this edition of the Testament. He was at the time a journeyman with Rogers & Fowle, and worked at the press'. The story is minute and circumstantial; but no bibliographer, not even Thomas himself, has yet seen either of the books. No Bible dated 1752 from the press of Mark Baskett can be found. His name first appears in 1761. For these reasons O'Callaghan has included neither of the editions in his 'List of Editions of the Holy Scriptures printed in America,' Albany, 1860.
