= Worshipful Company of Stationers and Newspaper Makers =

Livery company of the City of London

Coordinates: 51.51425°N 0.10147°W

Stationers' Company
- Motto: Verbum Domini manet in aeternum ("The Word of the Lord endures forever")
- Location: Stationers Hall, Ave Maria Place, City of London EC4M 7DD
- Date of formation: 1403; 623 years ago
- Charter granted: 1557; 469 years ago
- Company association: Journalists and publishers
- Order of precedence: 47th
- Master of company: Ian Leggett
- Website: www.stationers.org

The Worshipful Company of Stationers and Newspaper Makers (until 1937 the Worshipful Company of Stationers), usually known as the Stationers' Company, is one of the livery companies of the City of London. The Stationers' Company was formed in 1403; it received a royal charter in 1557. It held a monopoly over the publishing industry and was officially responsible for setting and enforcing regulations until the enactment of the Statute of Anne, also known as the Copyright Act 1710. Once the company received its charter, "the company's role was to regulate and discipline the industry, define proper conduct and maintain its own corporate privileges."

The company members, including master, wardens, assistants, liverymen, freemen and apprentices are mostly involved with the modern visual and graphic communications industries that have evolved from the company's original trades. These include printing, paper-making, packaging, office products, engineering, advertising, design, photography, film and video production, publishing of books, newspapers and periodicals and digital media. The company's principal purpose nowadays is to provide an independent forum where its members can advance the interests (strategic, educational, training and charitable) of the industries associated with the company.

== History ==
In 1403, the Corporation of London approved the formation of a guild of stationers. At this time, the occupations considered stationers for the purposes of the guild were text writers, limners (illuminators), bookbinders or booksellers who worked at a fixed location (stationarius) beside the walls of St Paul's Cathedral. Booksellers sold manuscript books, or copies thereof produced by their respective firms for retail; they also sold writing materials. Illuminators illustrated and decorated manuscripts.

Printing gradually displaced manuscript production so that, by the time the guild received a royal charter of incorporation on 4 May 1557, it had in effect become a printers' guild. In 1559, it became the 47th in city livery company precedence. At the time, it was based at Peter's College, which it bought from St Paul's Cathedral. During the Tudor and Stuart periods, the Stationers were legally empowered to seize "offending books" that violated the standards of content set down by the Church and state; its officers could bring "offenders" before ecclesiastical authorities, usually the Bishop of London or the Archbishop of Canterbury, depending on the severity of the transgression. Thus the Stationers played an important role in the culture of England through the intensely turbulent decades of the Protestant Reformation and toward the English Civil War.

The Stationers' Charter, which codified its monopoly on book production, ensured that once a member had asserted ownership of a text or "copy" by having it approved by the company, no other member was entitled to publish it, that is, no one else had the "right to copy" it. This is the origin of the term "copyright". However, this original "right to copy" in England was different from the modern conception of copyright. The stationers' "copy right" was a protection granted to the printers of a book; "copyright" introduced with the Statute of Anne, or the Copyright Act 1710, was a right granted to the author(s) of a book based on statutory law.

Members of the company could, and mostly did, document their ownership of copyright in a work by entering it in the "entry book of copies" or the Stationers' Company Register. The Register of the Stationers' Company thus became one of the most essential documentary records in the later study of English Renaissance theatre. (In 1606 the Master of the Revels, who was responsible until this time for licensing plays for performance, acquired some overlapping authority over licensing them for publication as well; but the Stationers' Register remained a crucial and authoritative source of information after that date too.) Enforcement of such rules was always a challenge, in this area as in other aspects of the Tudor/Stuart regime. Works were often printed surreptitiously and illegally, and this would remain a subject of interest to both the Company and the government into the modern period.

In 1603, the Stationers formed the English Stock, a joint stock publishing company funded by shares held by members of the company. This profitable venture gave the Company a monopoly on printing certain types of works, including almanacs, prayer-books, and primers, some of the best-selling works of the day. By buying and holding shares in the English Stock (which were limited in number), members of the company received a nearly guaranteed return each year. The English Stock at times employed out-of-work printers, and disbursed some of the profit to the poor and to those reliant on the Company's pensions. When a printer or bookseller who held a share died, it might often pass to another relation, most often his widow.

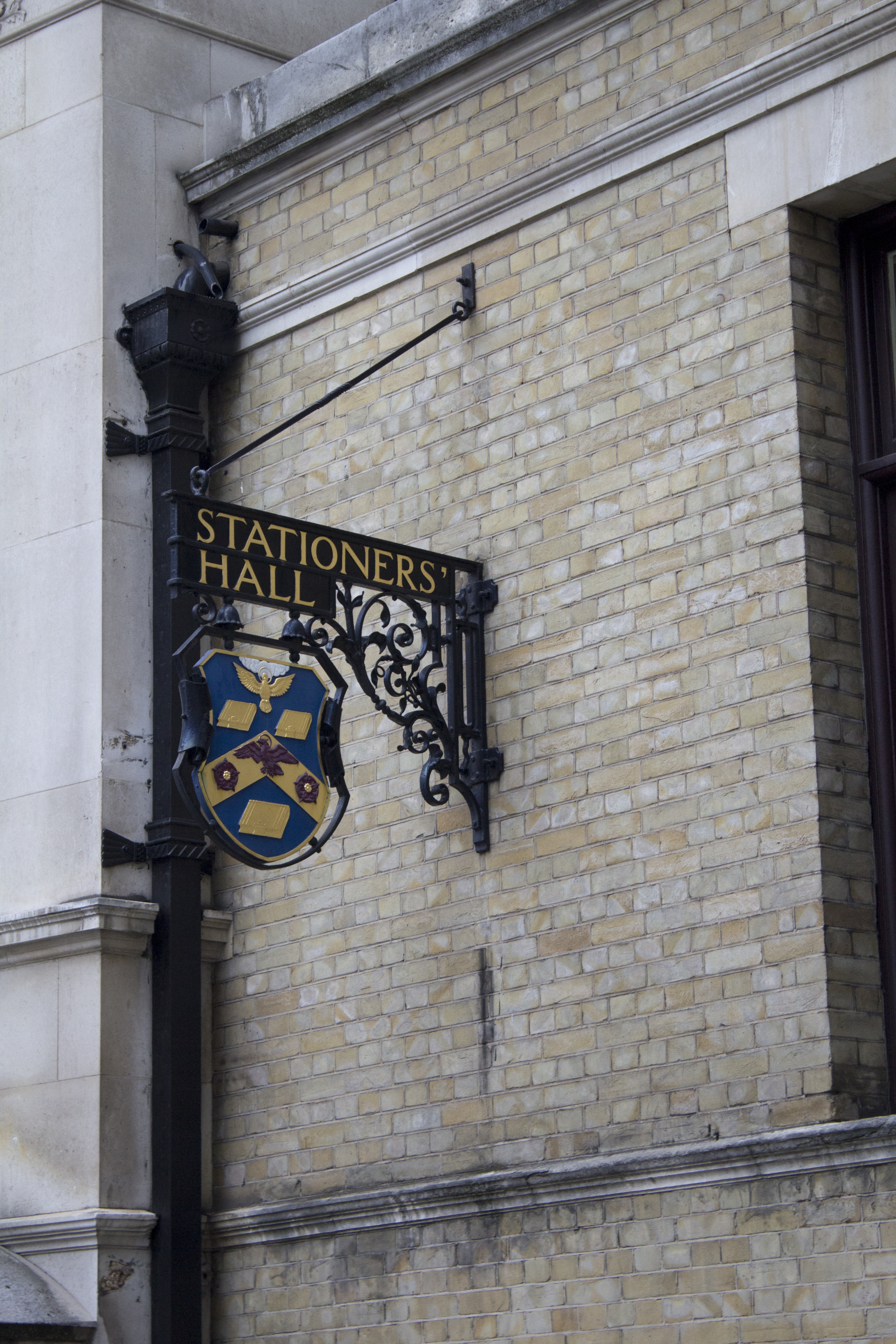
Stationers' Hall, London (2013 photo)

In 1611, the company bought Abergavenny House in Ave Maria Lane and moved out of Peter's College. The new hall burnt down in the Great Fire of 1666, along with most of its contents, including a great number of books. The Company's clerk, George Tokefeild, is said to have removed a great number of the Company's records to his home in the suburbs—without this act, much of the Company's history before 1666 would have been lost. It was rebuilt by 1674, and its present interior is much as it was when it reopened. The Court Room was added in 1748, and in 1800 the external façade was remodelled to its present form.

In 1695, the monopoly power of the Stationers' Company was diminished by the lapsing of their monopoly on printing, allowing presses to operate more freely outside of London than they had previously.

The stationers petitioned Parliament for new censorship legislation, and when that failed they argued that authors had a natural and inherent right of ownership in what they wrote (knowing there was little an author could do with such rights other than sign them over to a publisher). This argument persuaded the Parliament and in 1710 Parliament passed the Copyright Act 1709, the first such act to establish copyright as the purview of authors, not printers or publishers.

In 1861, the company established the Stationers' Company's School at Bolt Court, Fleet Street for the education of sons of members of the Company. In 1894, the school moved to Hornsey in north London, eventually closing nearly a century later in 1983.

Registration under the Copyright Act 1911 ended in December 1923; the company then established a voluntary register in which copyrights could be recorded to provide printed proof of ownership in case of disputes.

In 1937, a royal charter amalgamated the Stationers' Company and the Newspaper Makers' Company, which had been founded six years earlier (and whose members were predominant in Fleet Street), into the company of the present name.

In March 2012, the company established the "Young Stationers", to provide a forum for young people (under the age of 40) within the company and the civic City of London more broadly. This led to the establishment of the Young Stationers' Prize in 2014, which recognises outstanding achievements within the company's trades. Prize winners have included novelist Angela Clarke, journalist Katie Glass, and professor of journalism Dr Shane Tilton.

The company's motto is Verbum Domini manet in aeternum, Latin for "The Word of the Lord endures forever;" which appears on their heraldic charge.

In November 2020 Stationers' Hall the home of the Stationers' Company were granted approval to redevelop their Grade I listed building to bring modern day conference facilities, air-cooling and step free access to its historic rooms. It reopened in July 2022 for live events, weddings, and filming.

== Trades ==
The modern Stationers' Company represents the "content and communications" industries within the City of London Liveries. This includes the following trades and specialisms:

- Archiving (including librarian, curators, and book conservation)
- Bookselling and distribution
- Communications (including advertising, marketing, and PR)
- Digital media and software
- Newspapers and broadcasting
- Office products and supplies
- Packaging
- Paper
- Print machinery
- Printing
- Publishing (including digital publishing and design)
- Writing (including journalism, broadcasting, and authorship)

== Hall ==
Stationers' Hall is at Ave Maria Lane near Ludgate Hill. The site of the present hall was formerly the site of Abergavenny House, which was purchased by the Stationers in 1606 for £3,500, but destroyed in the Great Fire of London, 1666. The current building and hall date from circa 1670. The hall was remodelled in 1800 by the architect Robert Mylne and, on 4 January 1950, it was designated a Grade I listed building.

Stationers' Hall hosts the Shine School Media Awards, where students compete in the creation of websites and magazines.

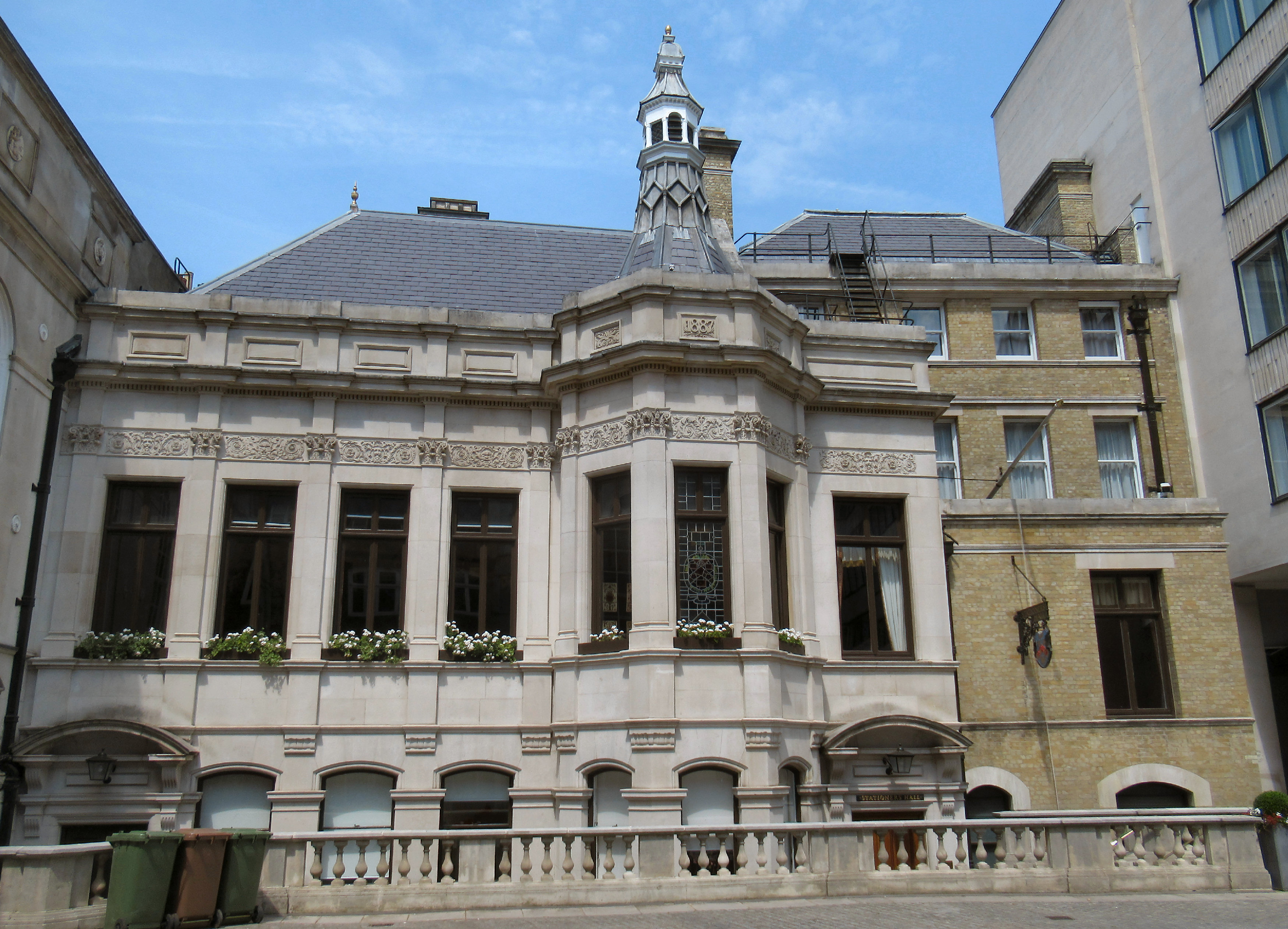
Stationers' Hall

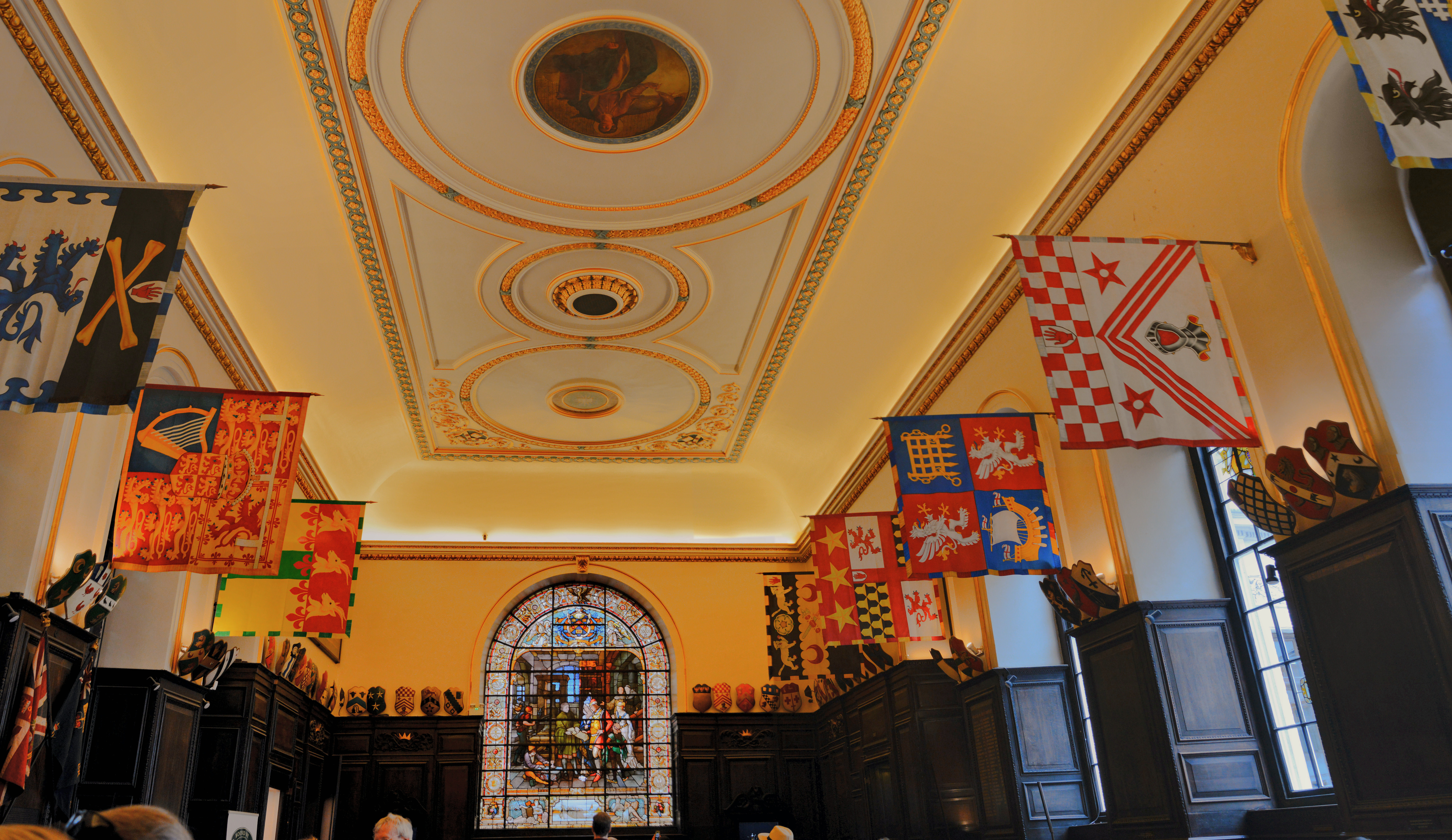
Main Hall

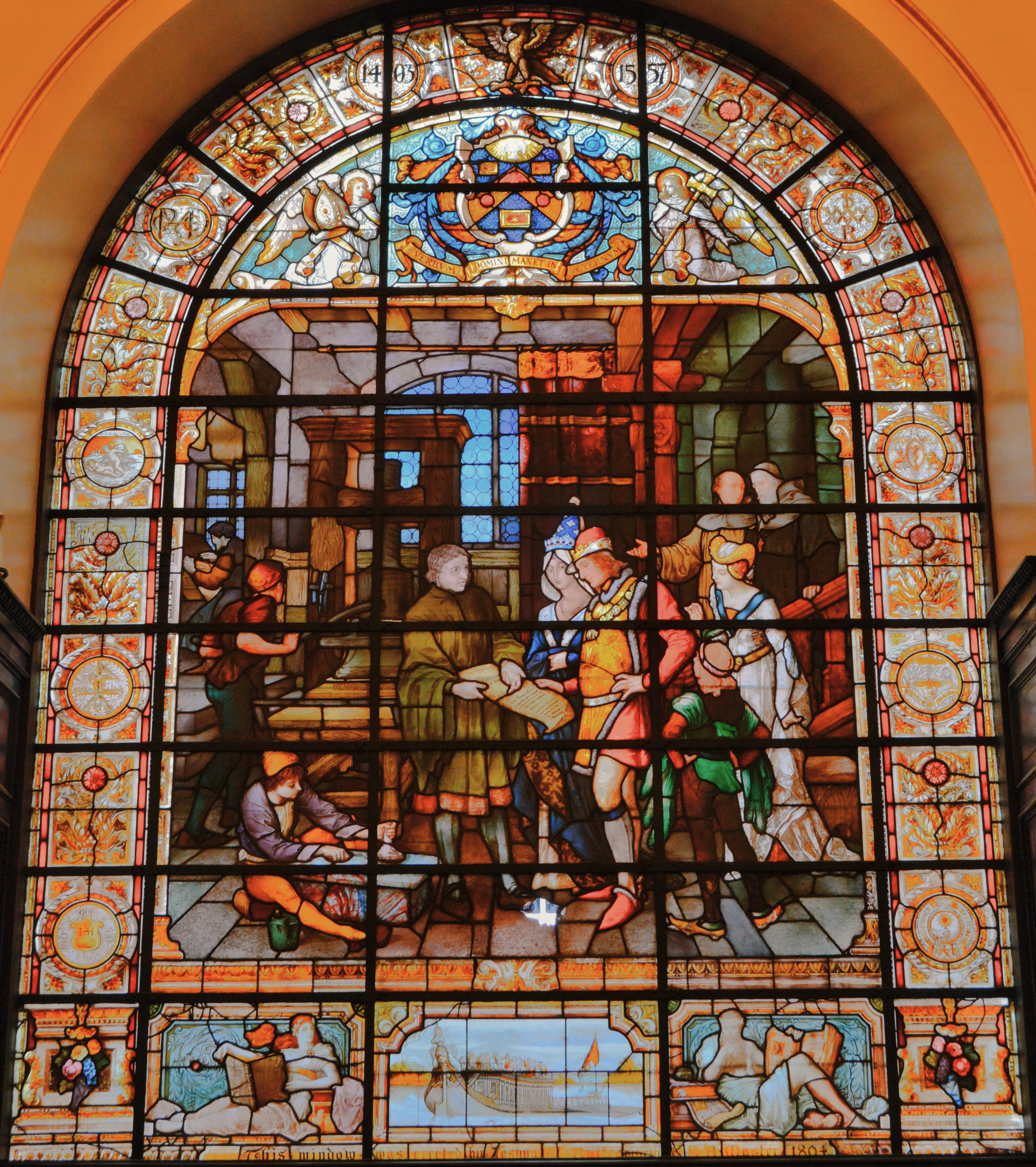
Caxton window

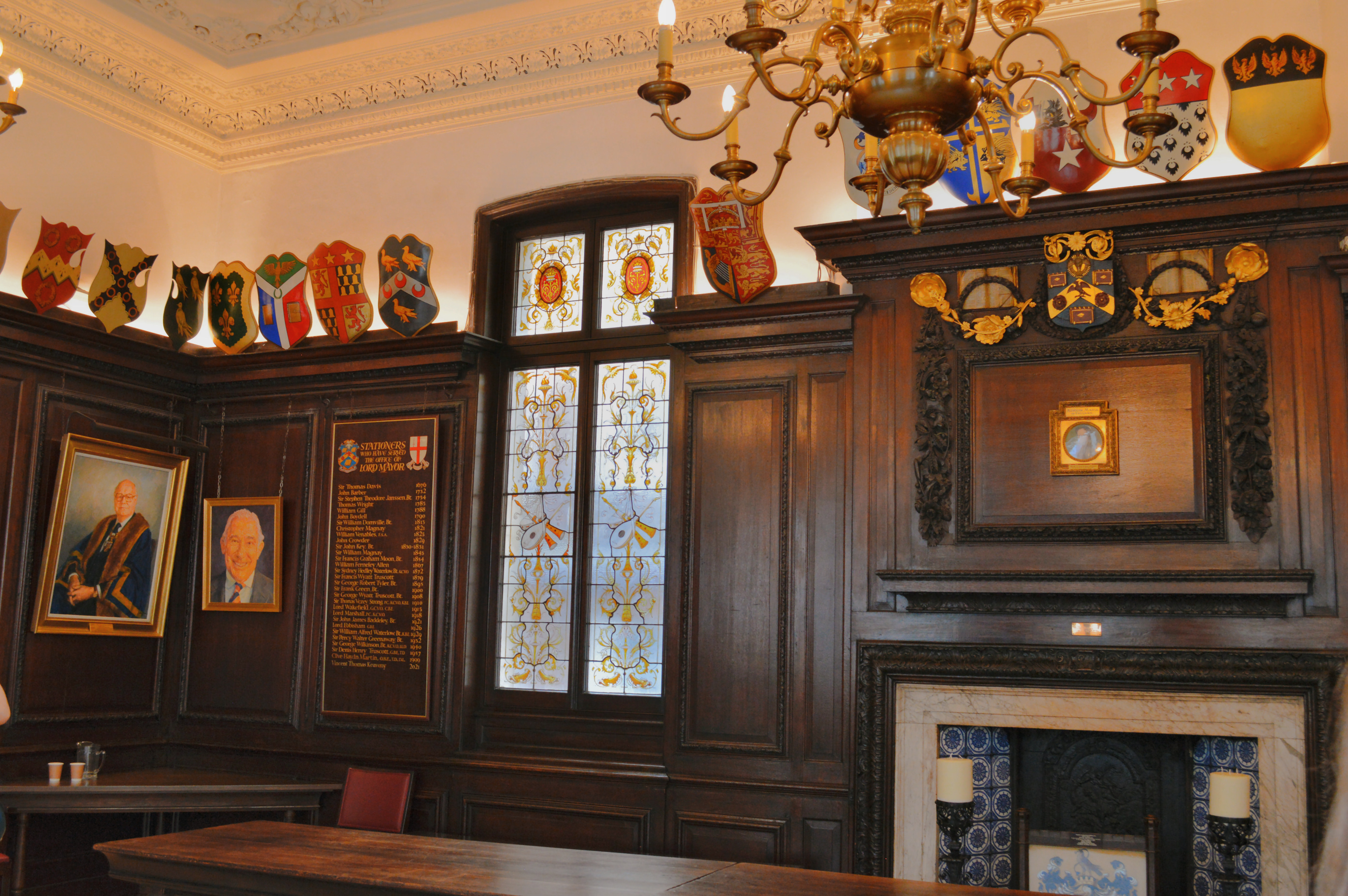
The Stock Room

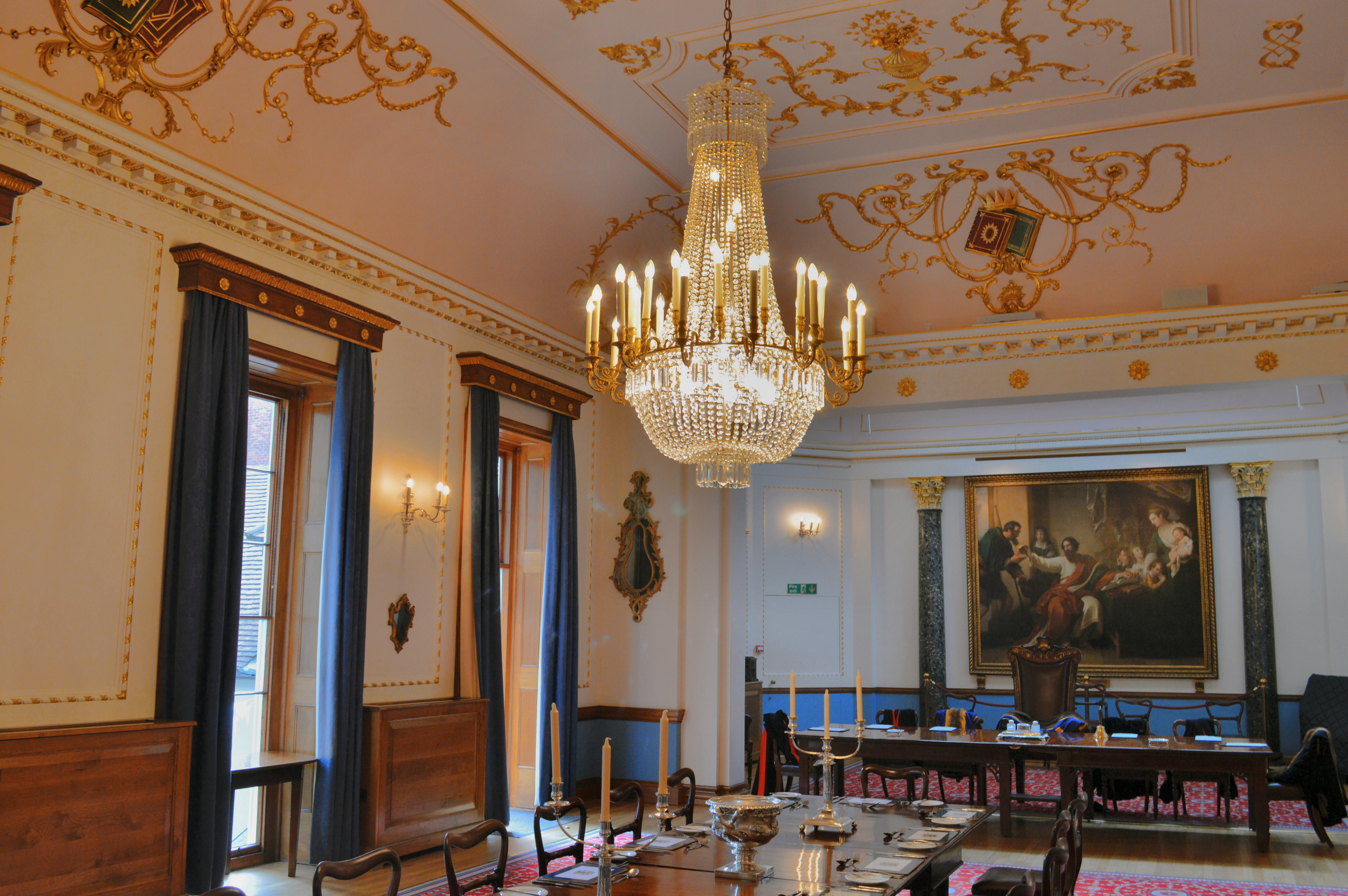
The Court Room

== Notable liverymen ==
- Elizabeth Purslowe
- Queen Camilla

== Court ==
Below are lists of officials who either sat on the Stationer's Company Court of Assistants, or who worked for the Company in another official capacity (Beadle, Treasurer, and Clerk) from the time the Company was first granted a charter in 1556 to the present day. As with most London livery companies, the Master of the Company was elected yearly, along with the Wardens. For the Stationers, this election day always took place in late June, the day before St. Peter's Day (June 29). Thus, a Master's term would run effectively from July to July. The dates below reflect the year a Master was elected and began a term of service. Upper and Under Wardens were elected at the same time, while Renter Wardens (those two wardens charged with collecting dues from members of the Company annually) were chosen for the following year in March, on or around Lady Day. The roles of Beadle and Clerk were likewise elected positions, filled whenever they came open, but were often held by the same members for years or even decades. The Treasurer of the Company/English Stock was elected annually in March along with the Stockeepers, and again, was often held by the same person for years. Any individuals listed below who died, resigned, or were ejected from their offices while serving are indicated with a footnote, which includes who replaced them.

The master oversaw Company courts; meetings of the Assistants and sometimes the Livery and wider membership where Company business was discussed and resolved. These courts were usually held monthly but could be held more or less frequently. Although official company positions were historically always held by men until the twentieth century, women have always participated meaningfully in the life of the Company, at certain times even holding a controlling interest in the Company's joint stock venture, known as the English Stock.

The first woman elected master was Helen Esmonde, who held the position in 2015.

=== 1555–1599 ===
Sixteenth Century Court Officials, 1556–1599
Year elected	Master	Upper Warden	Under Warden	Renter Wardens	Clerk	Beadle	Treasurer
1555	Thomas Dockwray	John Cawood	Henry Cooke	John Walley; Anthony Smythe	Unknown	Unknown	Unknown
1556	Thomas Dockwray	John Cawood	Henry Cooke	John Walley	Unknown	Unknown	Unknown
1557	Thomas Dockwray	John Cawood	John Walley	John Walley	Unknown	John Ffayreberne	Unknown
1558	Richard Waye	John Jaques	John Turke	Unknown	Unknown	John Ffayreberne	Unknown
1559	Reginald (Reyner) Wolfe	Michael Loble	Thomas Duxwell	Unknown	Unknown	John Ffayreberne	Unknown
1560	Stephen Kevall	Richard Jugge	John Judson	Unknown	Unknown	John Ffayreberne	Unknown
1561	John Cawood	William Seres	Richard Tottell	Unknown	Unknown	John Ffayreberne	Unknown
1562	John Cawood	Michael Loble	Richard Harrison	Unknown	Unknown	John Ffayreberne	Unknown
1563	Richard Waye	Richard Jugge	Roger Ireland	Unknown	Unknown	John Ffayreberne	Unknown
1564	Reginald (Reyner) Wolfe	John Walley	John Day	Unknown	Unknown	John Ffayreberne	Unknown
1565	Stephen Kevall	William Seres	James Gonneld	Unknown	Unknown	John Ffayreberne	Unknown
1566	John Cawood	Richard Jugge	John Day	Unknown	Unknown	John Ffayreberne	Unknown
1567	Reginald (Reyner) Wolfe	Richard Tottell	James Gonneld	Unknown	Unknown	John Ffayreberne	Unknown
1568	Richard Jugge	Richard Tottell	Roger Ireland	Unknown	Unknown	John Ffayreberne	Unknown
1569	Richard Jugge	John Walley	William Norton	Unknown	Unknown	John Ffayreberne	Unknown
1570	William Seres	John Judson	William Norton	Unknown	Unknown	John Ffayreberne	Unknown
1571	William Seres	John Day	Humphrey Toy	Unknown	George Wapull	Unknown	Unknown
1572	Reginald (Reyner) Wolfe	James Gonneld	Humphrey Toy	Unknown	George Wapull	Unknown	Unknown
1573	Richard Jugge	William Norton	John Harrison Sr.	Unknown	George Wapull	Unknown	Unknown
1574	Richard Jugge	Richard Tottell	William Cooke	Unknown	George Wapull	Unknown	Unknown
1575	William Seres	John Day	Thomas Marsh	Unknown	Richard Collins	Unknown	Unknown
1576	William Seres	James Gonneld	Richard Watkins	Unknown	Richard Collins	Unknown	Unknown
1577	William Seres	William Norton	Richard Watkins	Unknown	Richard Collins	Unknown	Unknown
1578	Richard Tottel	John Harrison Sr.	George Bishop	Unknown	Richard Collins	Unknown	Unknown
1579	James Gonneld	John Harrison Sr.	George Bishop	Unknown	Richard Collins	Unknown	Unknown
1580	John Day	Richard Watkins	Francis Coldock	Unknown	Richard Collins	Timothy Rider	Unknown
1581	William Norton	Thomas Marsh	Garrat Dewce	Unknown	Richard Collins	Timothy Rider	Unknown
1582	James Gonneld	Christopher Barker	Francis Coldock	Unknown	Richard Collins	Timothy Rider	Unknown
1583	John Harrison Sr.	Richard Watkins	Ralph Newbery	Unknown	Richard Collins	Timothy Rider	Unknown
1584	Richard Tottel	George Bishop	Ralph Newbery	Unknown	Richard Collins	Timothy Rider	Unknown
1585	James Gonneld	Christopher Barker	Henry Conway	Unknown	Richard Collins	Timothy Rider	Unknown
1586	William Norton	George Bishop	Henry Denham	Unknown	Richard Collins	Timothy Rider	Unknown
1587	John Judson	Francis Coldock	Henry Middleton	Unknown	Richard Collins	John Wolfe	Unknown
1588	John Harrison Sr.	Francis Coldock	Henry Denham	Unknown	Richard Collins	John Wolfe	Unknown
1589	Richard Watkins	Ralph Newbery	Gabriel Cawood	Unknown	Richard Collins	John Wolfe	Unknown
1590	George Bishop	Ralph Newbery	Gabriel Cawood	Unknown	Richard Collins	John Wolfe	Unknown
1591	Francis Coldock	Henry Conway	George Allen	Unknown	Richard Collins	John Wolfe	Unknown
1592	George Bishop	Henry Conway	Thomas Stirrop	Unknown	Richard Collins	John Wolfe	Unknown
1593	William Norton	Gabriel Cawood	Thomas Woodcock	Unknown	Richard Collins	John Wolfe	Unknown
1594	Richard Watkins	Gabriel Cawood	Isaac Binge	Unknown	Richard Collins	John Wolfe	Unknown
1595	Francis Coldock	Isaac Binge	Thomas Dawson	Unknown	Richard Collins	John Wolfe	Unknown
1596	John Harrison Sr.	Thomas Stirrop	Thomas Dawson	Unknown	Richard Collins	John Wolfe	Unknown
1597	Gabriel Cawood	Thomas Stirrop	Thomas Man	Unknown	Richard Collins	John Wolfe	Unknown
1598	Ralph Newbery	Isaac Binge	William Ponsonby	Unknown	Richard Collins	Toby Cooke	Unknown
1599	Gabriel Cawood	Thomas Man	John Windet	Unknown	Richard Collins	Toby Cooke	Unknown

=== 1600–1699 ===
Seventeenth-century Court Officials, 1600–1699
Year elected	Master	Upper Warden	Under Warden	Senior Renter Warden	Junior Renter Warden	Clerk	Beadle	Treasurer	Elected to Court of Assistants
1600	George Bishop	Thomas Dawson	Richard White	Unknown	Unknown	Richard Collins	John Hardy	Unknown	
1601	Ralph Newbery	Robert Barker	Gregory Seton	Unknown	Unknown	Richard Collins	John Hardy	Unknown	
1602	George Bishop	Thomas Man	Simon Waterson	Unknown	Unknown	Richard Collins	John Hardy	Unknown	
1603	Isaac Binge	Thomas Dawson	Humphrey Hooper	Unknown	Unknown	Richard Collins	John Hardy	Unknown	
1604	Thomas Man	John Norton	William Leake	Unknown	Unknown	Richard Collins	John Hardy	Unknown	
1605	Robert Barker	John Norton	Richard Feild	Unknown	Unknown	Richard Collins	John Hardy	Nathaniel Butter	
1606	Robert Barker	Edward White	William Leake	Unknown	Unknown	Richard Collins	John Hardy	William Cotton	
1607	John Norton	Gregory Seton	John Standish	William Newton	Unknown	Richard Collins	John Hardy	William Cotton	
1608	George Bishop	Humphrey Hooper	Humphrey Lownes	Unknown	Unknown	Richard Collins	John Hardy	William Cotton	
1609	Thomas Dawson	Simon Waterson	John Standish	Unknown	Unknown	Richard Collins	John Hardy	Edmund Weaver	
1610	Thomas Man	William Leake	Thomas Adams	Anthony Gilman	Unknown	Richard Collins	John Hardy	Edmund Weaver	
1611	John Norton	Richard Feild	Humphrey Lownes	Unknown	Unknown	Richard Collins	John Hardy	Edmund Weaver	
1612	John Norton	Humphrey Hooper	John Harrison Jr.	Unknown	Unknown	Richard Collins	John Hardy	Edmund Weaver	
1613	Bonham Norton	Richard Field	Richard Ockould	Unknown	Unknown	Thomas Mountfort	Thomas Bushell	Edmund Weaver	
1614	Thomas Man	William Leake	Thomas Adams	Felix Kingston	Unknown	Thomas Mountfort	Thomas Bushell	Edmund Weaver	
1615	Thomas Dawson	Humphrey Lownes, senior	George Swinhowe	Unknown	Unknown	Thomas Mountfort	Thomas Bushell	Edmund Weaver	
1616	Thomas Man	Thomas Adams	Matthew Lownes	Matthew Law	Unknown	Thomas Mountfort	Thomas Bushell	Edmund Weaver	
1617	Simon Waterson	Humphrey Lownes, senior	George Swinhowe	Robert Bolton	Unknown	Thomas Mountfort	Richard Badger	Edmund Weaver	
1618	William Leake	Thomas Adams	Anthony Gilman	Leonard Kempe	Unknown	Thomas Mountfort	Richard Badger	Edmund Weaver	
1619	Richard Field	George Swinhowe	John Jaggard	Thomas Purfoote	John Harrison	Thomas Mountfort	Richard Badger	Edmund Weaver	
1620	Humphrey Lownes	Matthew Lownes	George Cole	John Harrison	John Jaggard	Thomas Mountfort	Richard Badger	Edmund Weaver	
1621	Simon Waterson	George Swinhowe	Clement Knight	Richard Tombes	Unknown	Thomas Mountfort	Richard Badger	Edmund Weaver	
1622	Richard Field	Anthony Gilman	Thomas Pavier	Richard Tombes	John Browne	Thomas Mountfort	Richard Badger	Edmund Weaver	
1623	George Swinhowe	George Cole	John Bill	John Browne	Unknown	Thomas Mountfort	Richard Badger	Edmund Weaver	
1624	Humphrey Lownes	Matthew Lownes	Henry Cooke	Unknown	Unknown	Thomas Mountfort	Richard Badger	Edmund Weaver	
1625	George Swinhowe	Anthony Gilman	Adam Islip	William Aspley	Roger Jackson	Thomas Mountfort	Richard Badger	Edmund Weaver	
1626	Bonham Norton	Clement Knight	Felix Kingston	John Rothwell	Henry Fetherstone	Thomas Mountfort	Richard Badger	Edmund Weaver	
1627	George Cole	Clement Knight	Edmund Weaver	Henry Featherstone	Nathaniel Butter	Thomas Mountfort	Richard Badger	Edmund Weaver	
1628	George Cole	Adam Islip	Edmund Weaver	Unknown	Unknown	Thomas Mountfort	Richard Badger	Edmund Weaver	
1629	Bonham Norton	John Bill	Thomas Purfoote	John Busby	Emanuel Exoll	Thomas Mountfort	Richard Badger	Edmund Weaver	
1630	George Swinhowe	Felix Kingston	John Harrison	Emanuel Exoll	Thomas Downes	Thomas Mountfort	Richard Badger	Edmund Weaver	
1631	George Cole	Adam Islip	John Smethwick	Thomas Downes	Richard Moore	Henry Walley	Richard Badger	Edmund Weaver	
1632	George Cole	Edmund Weaver	William Aspley	John Beale	Richard Higganbotham	Henry Walley	Richard Badger	Edmund Weaver	
1633	Adam Islip	Edmund Weaver	William Aspley	John Hoth	John Parker	Henry Walley	Richard Badger	Edmund Weaver	Nicholas Bourne
1634	Adam Islip	Thomas Purfoote	John Rothwell	John Parker	Francis Constable	Henry Walley	Richard Badger	Edmund Weaver	
1635	Felix Kingston	John Smethwick	Henry Featherstone	Richard Whitaker	George Latham	Henry Walley	John Badger	Edmund Weaver	
1636	Felix Kingston	John Harrison	Thomas Downes	George Latham	Jonas Wellings	Henry Walley	John Badger	Edmund Weaver	
1637	Edmund Weaver	William Aspley	Nicholas Bourne	Jonas Wellings	Ephraim Dawson	Henry Walley	John Badger	Edmund Weaver	Samuel Mann
1638	John Harrison Jr.	John Rothwell	Robert Mead	George Miller	Edward Brewster	Henry Walley	John Badger	Unknown	
1639	John Smethwick	Henry Featherstone	Nicholas Bourne	Jonas Wellings	Ephraim Dawson	Henry Walley	John Badger	Edward Brewster	
1640	William Aspley	Thomas Downes	Samuel Mann	Jacob Bloome	John Bellamy	Henry Walley	Joseph Hunscott	Edward Brewster	
1641	Henry Fetherstone	Nicholas Bourne	John Parker	Robert Bird	John Bartlett	Henry Walley	Joseph Hunscott	Edward Brewster	
1642	Thomas Downes	Robert Meade	George Edwards	Nicholas Fussell	Christopher Meredith	Henry Walley	Joseph Hunscott	Edward Brewster	Miles Flesher
1643	Nicholas Bourne	Samuel Mann	Richard Whitaker	Christopher Meredith	Robert Dawlman	Henry Walley	Joseph Hunscott	Edward Brewster	William Lee; Philemon Stephens; Henry Seile; Henry Walley; Jacob Bloome
1644	Robert Mead	John Parker	Richard Whitaker	Robert Dawlman	William Crawley	Henry Walley	Joseph Hunscott	Edward Brewster	
1645	Robert Mead	John Parker	George Miller	William Crawley	John Marriott	Henry Walley	Joseph Hunscott	Edward Brewster	Richard Thrale; Humphrey Robinson; Matthew Walbanck
1646	Samuel Mann	Richard Whitaker	Henry Seile	John Marriott	Richard Coates	Henry Walley	Joseph Hunscott	Edward Brewster	
1647	John Parker	George Latham	John Bellamy	Richard Coates	Samuel Cartwright	Henry Walley	Joseph Hunscott	Edward Brewster	
1648	Thomas Downes	Ephraim Dawson	William Lee	Samuel Cartwright	Humphrey Moseley	Henry Walley	Joseph Hunscott	George Sawbridge	
1649	Robert Mead	Miles Flesher	John Chappell	Humphrey Moseley	Thomas Dainty	Henry Walley	Joseph Hunscott	George Sawbridge	
1650	George Latham	Miles Flesher	Philemon Stephens	Thomas Dainty	Roger Norton	Henry Walley	Joseph Hunscott	George Sawbridge	
1651	Nicholas Bourne	John Legate	Humphrey Robinson	Roger Norton	George Thomason	Henry Walley	Joseph Hunscott	George Sawbridge	Roger Norton Sr.; Humphrey Moseley; George Thomason
1652	Miles Flesher	John Legate	Richard Thrale	George Thomason	Octavian Pulleyn	John Burroughs	Joseph Hunscott	George Sawbridge	
1653	Miles Flesher	Henry Seile	Humphrey Robinson	Octavian Pulleyn	Andrew Crooke	John Burroughs	Joseph Hunscott	George Sawbridge	Ralph Triplett; Andrew Crooke; Octavian Pulleyn
1654	Samuel Mann	William Lee	Roger Norton	Andrew Crooke	Luke Fawne	John Burroughs	Joseph Hunscott	George Sawbridge	
1655	Henry Walley	Philemon Stephens	Roger Norton	Luke Fawne	Thomas Gold	John Burroughs	Joseph Hunscott	George Sawbridge	
1656	Robert Mead	Humphrey Robinson	Richard Thrale	Evan Tiler	Ralph Rounthwaite	John Burroughs	Joseph Hunscott	George Sawbridge	William Leake; John Rothwell; Daniel Pakeman; Luke Fawne; Ralph Harford
1657	Henry Seile	William Lee	George Thomason	Alexander Fifield	Ralph Smith	John Burroughs	Joseph Hunscott	George Sawbridge	
1658	Samuel Mann	Philemon Stephens	Octavian Pulleyn	Francis Leach	Thomas Hunt	John Burroughs	Joseph Hunscott	George Sawbridge	
1659	William Lee	Richard Thrale	Humphrey Moseley	Joshua Kirton	Abel Roper	John Burroughs	Joseph Hunscott	George Sawbridge	
1660	Philemon Stephens	Roger Norton	Andrew Crooke	Abel Roper	Giles Calvert	John Burroughs	Nicholas Fussell	George Sawbridge	
1661	Humphrey Robinson	George Thomason	William Leake	Robert White	Richard Best	John Burroughs	Nicholas Fussell	George Sawbridge	Evan Tyler; Ralph Rounthwaite
1662	Miles Flesher	Octavian Pulleyn	Daniel Pakeman	Richard Best	Abraham Miller	John Burroughs	Nicholas Fussell	George Sawbridge	Ralph Smith; Francis Coles; William Wilson
1663	Miles Flesher	Andrew Crooke	Luke Fawne	Humphrey Tuckey	Edmund Paxton	George Tokefeild	Nicholas Fussell	George Sawbridge	Richard Royston
1664	Richard Thrale	Octavian Pulleyn	Evan Tyler	Joseph Surbutt	Richard Tomlyns	George Tokefeild	Nicholas Fussell	George Sawbridge	
1665	Andrew Crooke	William Leake	Ralph Smith	Richard Tomlyns	Samuel Gellibrand	George Tokefeild	Nicholas Fussell	George Sawbridge	
1666	Andrew Crooke	Evan Tyler	Richard Royston	Samuel Gellibrand	John Macocke	George Tokefeild	John Cleaver	George Sawbridge	Thomas Hunt; Edward Husbands
1667	Humphrey Robinson	Evan Tyler	Richard Royston	John Macocke	Richard Clarke	George Tokefeild	John Cleaver	George Sawbridge	William Tibbs; Abel Roper; Thomas Davies; Robert White; James Flesher; Humfrey Tuckey
1668	Thomas Davies	Ralph Smith	Thomas Hunt	Richard Clarke	Henry Twyford	George Tokefeild	John Cleaver	George Sawbridge	Roger Norton Jr.; Samuel Mearne; Thomas Roycroft
1669	Thomas Davies	Ralph Smith	Thomas White	Henry Twyford	John Clarke, Jr.	George Tokefeild	John Cleaver	George Sawbridge	
1670	William Leake	Francis Coles	Abel Roper	John Clarke	George Calvert	George Tokefeild	John Cleaver	George Sawbridge	
1671	Evan Tyler	Richard Royston	Roger Norton	George Calvert	Thomas Vere	George Tokefeild	John Cleaver	George Sawbridge	
1672	Ralph Smith	Abell Roper	Samuel Mearne	Major Brook	George Eversden	George Tokefeild	John Cleaver	George Sawbridge	
1673	Richard Royston	Robert White	Samuel Mearne	Thomas Williams	Andrew Nicholson	John Lilly	John Cleaver	George Sawbridge	
1674	Richard Royston	Robert White	Thomas Roycroft	Henry Leigh	Henry Herringman	John Lilly	Randall Taylor	George Sawbridge	
1675	George Sawbridge	Roger Norton	Samuel Gellibrand	William Miller	Henry Lee	John Lilly	Randall Taylor	George Sawbridge	
1676	Abel Roper	Samuel Mearne	Richard Clarke	Henry Lee	John Wright	John Lilly	Randall Taylor	George Sawbridge	
1677	Robert White	Thomas Roycroft	Thomas Vere	Christopher Wall	Thomas Raw	John Lilly	Randall Taylor	George Sawbridge	
1678	Roger Norton	John Macocke	John Martin	William Fisher	John Haies	John Lilly	Randall Taylor	John Leigh	
1679	Samuel Mearne	Thomas Vere	Thomas Newcomb	John Sims	Robert Clavell	John Lilly	Randall Taylor	John Leigh	
1680	John Macock	Richard CLarke	Francis Tyton	Thomas Goreing	Godfrey Head	John Lilly	Randall Taylor	John Leigh	
1681	Thomas Vere	Thomas Newcomb, Sr.	John Towse	Nathaniel Ranew	Dorman Newman	John Garrett	Randall Taylor	John Leigh	
1682	Samuel Mearne	Francis Tyton	Henry Hills	Thomas Spicer/Helder	Samuel Herrick	John Garrett	Randall Taylor	John Leigh	
1683	Roger Norton	John Towse	Henry Hills	Samuel Hoyle	Adam Felton	John Garrett	Randall Taylor	John Leigh	
1684	Roger Norton	Henry Hills	James Cotterell	Christopher Wall	Nathaniel Ponder	John Garrett	Randall Taylor	John Leigh	
1685	Henry Herringman	John Bellinger	Ambrose Isted	Bennett Griffin	Adiel Mill	John Garrett	Randall Taylor	John Leigh	
1686	John Bellinger	John Baker	Robert Clavell	Daniel Peacock	Thomas Sawbridge	John Garrett	Randall Taylor	John Leigh	
1687, June to October	Roger Norton	John Baker	Thomas Bassett	John Penn	George Wells	John Garrett	Randall Taylor	Benjamin Tooke	
1687, October to 1688, June	Henry Hills	Edward Brewster	Christopher Wilkinson	John Penn	Gabriel Cox	John Garrett	Randall Taylor	Benjamin Tooke	
1688, July to November	Henry Hills	John Simms	Benjamin Tooke	Thomas Hodgkins	Robert Roberts	John Garrett	Randall Taylor	Benjamin Tooke	
1688, November to 1689, June	John Towse	Major John Baker	Robert Clavell	Thomas Hodgkins	Robert Roberts	John Garrett	Randall Taylor	Benjamin Tooke	
1689	Edward Brewster	Ambrose Isted	Thomas Parkhurst	Thomas Snodham	Thomas Minshull	John Garrett	Randall Taylor	Benjamin Tooke	
1690	Ambrose Isted	Henry Clarke	Henry Mortlock	John Harding	James Oades	John Garrett	Randall Taylor	Benjamin Tooke	
1691	Ambrose Isted	Thomas Bassett	Henry Mortlock	Freeman Collins	William Baker	John Garrett	Randall Taylor	Benjamin Tooke	
1692	Edward Brewster	John Simms	William Phillipps	John Miller	Edward Jones	John Garrett	Randall Taylor	Benjamin Tooke	
1693	John Bellinger	Thomas Bassett	William Phillipps	Richard Sare	James Damson	Christopher Grandorge	Nicholas Hooper	Benjamin Tooke	
1694	John Sims	Henry Mortlock	Samuel Lowndes	John Williams	John Darby	Christopher Grandorge	Nicholas Hooper	Benjamin Tooke	
1695	John Sims	William Rawlins	Samuel Lowndes	William Horton	John Heptinstall	Christopher Grandorge	Nicholas Hooper	Benjamin Tooke	
1696	Henry Mortlock	Samuel Heyrick	John Richardson	Oliver Elliston	John Baskett	Christopher Grandorge	Nicholas Hooper	Benjamin Tooke	
1697	Henry Mortlock	Samuel Lowndes	Bennett Griffin	William Wyld	Nicholas Boddington	Christopher Grandorge	Nicholas Hooper	Benjamin Tooke	
1698	Robert Clavell	Samuel Lowndes	Richard Simpson	John Leake	Luke Meredith	Simon Beckley	Nicholas Hooper	Benjamin Tooke	
1699	Robert Clavell	Samuel Heyrick	Charles Harper	Edward Limpany	Benjamin Bound	Simon Beckley	Nicholas Hooper	Benjamin Tooke	

=== 1700–1799 ===
Eighteenth Century Court Officials, 1700–1799
Year elected	Master	Upper Warden	Under Warden	Senior Renter Warden	Junior Renter Warden	Clerk	Beadle	Treasurer
1700	William Phillips	Richard Simpson	Samuel Sprint	Awnsham Churchill	Robert Vincent	Simon Beckley	Nicholas Hooper	Benjamin Tooke
1701	William Phillips	Richard Simpson	Samuel Sprint	John Lawrence	Thomas Bennett	Simon Beckley	Nicholas Hooper	Benjamin Tooke
1702	William Phillips	Walter Kettleby	Robert Andrews	Matthew Wootton	Christopher Bateman	Simon Beckley	Nicholas Hooper	Benjamin Tooke
1703	Thomas Parkhurst	Walter Kettleby	Robert Andrews	John Taylor	Richard Mount	Simon Beckley	Henry Million	Joseph Collyer
1704	Richard Simpson	Samuel Sprint	Thomas Hodgkin	Ralph Simpson	Joshua Phillips	Simon Beckley	Henry Million	Joseph Collyer
1705	Richard Simpson	Samuel Sprint	Thomas Hodgkin	George Mortimer	Samuel Manship	Simon Beckley	Henry Million	Joseph Collyer
1706	Walter Kettleby	Robert Andrews	Israel Harrison	John Gerrard	George Littlebury	Simon Beckley	Henry Million	Joseph Collyer
1707	Edward Darrel	Robert Andrews	Freeman Collins	Christopher Browne	John Williams	Simon Beckley	Henry Million	Joseph Collyer
1708	Charles Harper	Samuel Roycroft	Freeman Collins	Henry Rhodes	John Clarke	Simon Beckley	Henry Million	Joseph Collyer
1709	William Phillips	Thomas Hodgkin	John Baskett	George Grafton	Abel Roper	Simon Beckley	Henry Million	Joseph Collyer
1710	William Phillips	Freeman Collins	John Baskett	Samuel Crouch	James Knapton	Simon Beckley	Henry Million	Joseph Collyer
1711	William Phillips	Israel Harrison	Daniel Browne	John Mayos	John Mathews	Simon Beckley	Henry Million	Joseph Collyer
1712	William Phillips	Freeman Collins	William Freeman	Henry Parsons	Andrew Bell	Simon Beckley	Henry Million	Joseph Collyer
1713	Daniel Browne	Nicholas Boddington	John Lawrence	Jonah Bowyer	Joseph Downing	Simon Beckley	Henry Million	Joseph Collyer
1714	John Baskett	Nicholas Boddington	Richard Mount	John Wyatt	James Holland	Simon Beckley	Henry Million	Joseph Collyer
1715	John Baskett	Richard Mount	John Sprint	Thomas Varnum	Bernard Lintot	Simon Beckley	Henry Million	Joseph Collyer
1716	Nicholas Boddington	John Sprint	Robert Knaplock	Thomas Norris	Samuel Clarke	Simon Beckley	Henry Million	Joseph Collyer
1717	Nicholas Boddington	John Sprint	Robert Knaplock	Richard Harris	John Buchanan	Simon Beckley	Henry Million	Joseph Collyer
1718	Richard Mount	John Sprint	Robert Knaplock	William Mears	Samuel Welshman	Simon Beckley	Henry Million	Joseph Collyer
1719	Richard Mount	Robert Knaplock	John Taylor	John Pickard	John Buchanan	Simon Beckley	Henry Million	Joseph Collyer
1720	John Sprint	Robert Knaplock	Daniel Midwinter	Benjamin Brown	John Bradshaw	Simon Beckley	Henry Million	Joseph Collyer
1721	John Sprint	John Walthoe	James Knapton	Robert Gosling	Samuel Ballard	Simon Beckley	Thomas Lingard	Joseph Collyer
1722	John Knaplock	John Walthoe	James Knapton	Thomas Wood	John Walthoe, Jr.	Simon Beckley	Thomas Lingard	Joseph Collyer
1723	John Knaplock	Daniel Midwinter	James Roberts	John Knapton	Samuel Tooke	Simon Beckley	Thomas Lingard	Joseph Collyer
1724	John Knaplock	Daniel Midwinter	James Roberts	Samuel Palmer	Jeremiah Batley	Nathaniel Cole	Thomas Lingard	Joseph Collyer
1725	John Walthoe	James Knapton	Richard Wilkin	John Marriott	Nathan Firth	Nathaniel Cole	Thomas Lingard	Thomas Simpson Sr.
1726	John Walthoe	James Knapton	Richard Wilkin	William Wilkin	John Peele	Nathaniel Cole	Thomas Lingard	Thomas Simpson Sr.
1727	James Knapton	James Roberts	William Mount	Phillip Gwillim	John Hooke	Nathaniel Cole	Thomas Lingard	Thomas Simpson Sr.
1728	James Knapton	James Roberts	William Mount	Aaron Ward	John March	Nathaniel Cole	Thomas Lingard	Thomas Simpson Sr.
1729	James Roberts	John Darby	Bernard Lintot	John Clark	Allington Wilde	Nathaniel Cole	Thomas Lingard	Thomas Simpson Sr.
1730	James Roberts	John Darby	Bernard Lintot	Samuel Birt	John Clarke	Nathaniel Cole	Thomas Lingard	Thomas Simpson Sr.
1731	James Roberts	William Mount	John Osborn	William Herbert	John Coles	Nathaniel Cole	Thomas Lingard	Thomas Simpson Sr.
1732	James Roberts	William Mount	John Osborn	Richard Hyat	William Burton	Nathaniel Cole	Thomas Lingard	Thomas Simpson Sr.
1733	William Mount	Samuel Ashhurst	Arthur Bettesworth	James Bettenham	John Bateman	Nathaniel Cole	Thomas Lingard	Thomas Simpson Sr.
1734	William Mount	Samuel Ashhurst	Arthur Bettesworth	Samuel Aris	Edward Say	Nathaniel Cole	Thomas Lingard	Thomas Simpson Jr.
1735	William Mount	Samuel Buckley	John Knapton	Philip Overton	Joel Stephens	Nathaniel Cole	Thomas Lingard	Thomas Simpson Jr.
1736	Samuel Ashurst	Samuel Buckley	John Knapton	Francis Jefferies	Henry Plowman	Nathaniel Cole	Thomas Lingard	Thomas Simpson Jr.
1737	Samuel Ashurst	Edmund Parker	Thomas Brewer	Lawton Gilliver	Thomas Waples	Nathaniel Cole	Thomas Lingard	Thomas Simpson Jr.
1738	Samuel Buckley	James Round	Thomas Brewer	John Loveday	Charles Ackers	Nathaniel Cole	Joseph Hazard	Thomas Simpson Jr.
1739	Samuel Buckley	John Knapton	William Innys	John Oswald	William Botham Jr.	Nathaniel Cole	Joseph Hazard	Thomas Simpson Jr.
1740	James Round	John Knapton	William Innys	John Cope	Richard Reily	Nathaniel Cole	Joseph Hazard	Thomas Simpson Jr.
1741	James Round	Thomas Brewer	Thomas Ward	Henry Woodfall Jr.	John Wilson	Nathaniel Cole	Joseph Hazard	Thomas Simpson Jr.
1742	John Knapton	Thomas Brewer	Thomas Ridge	John Hughes	Matthew Jenour	Nathaniel Cole	Joseph Hazard	Thomas Simpson Jr.
1743	John Knapton	William Innys	Thomas Ridge	James Mynde	Andrew Millar	Nathaniel Cole	Joseph Hazard	Thomas Simpson Jr.
1744	John Knapton	William Innys	Thomas Page	Joshua Jenour	John Beecroft	Nathaniel Cole	Joseph Hazard	Thomas Simpson Jr.
1745	Thomas Brewer	Thomas Ridge	Thomas Page	Jacob Ilive	Joseph Boddington	Nathaniel Cole	Joseph Hazard	Thomas Simpson Jr.
1746	Thomas Brewer	Thomas Ridge	Stephen Theodore Janssen	Richard Walkden	Thomas White	Nathaniel Cole	Joseph Hazard	Thomas Simpson Jr.
1747	William Innys	Thomas Page	Stephen Theodore Janssen	John Moore	George Woodfall	Nathaniel Cole	Joseph Hazard	Thomas Simpson Jr.
1748	William Innys	Thomas Page	Thomas Longman	Robert Browne	William Strahan	Nathaniel Cole	Joseph Hazard	Thomas Simpson Jr.
1749	Stephen Theodore Janssen	Thomas Longman	John Peele	Charles Greensay	Stephen Baylis	Nathaniel Cole	Joseph Hazard	Thomas Simpson Jr.
1750	Stephen Theodore Janssen	Thomas Longman	John March	Thomas Gardiner	Benjamin Stichall	Nathaniel Cole	Joseph Hazard	Thomas Simpson Jr.
1751	Thomas Ridge	William Wilkins	John March	George Flower	Thomas Wright	Nathaniel Cole	Richard Howard	Thomas Simpson Jr.
1752	Thomas Ridge	William Wilkins	Samuel Birt	Daniel Richards	William Farlow	Nathaniel Cole	Edward Littleton	Thomas Simpson Jr.
1753	Thomas Page	Samuel Richardson	Samuel Birt	Richard Baldwin Jr.	Thomas Simpson Jr.	Nathaniel Cole	Edward Littleton	Thomas Simpson Jr.
1754	Samuel Richardson	John March	Thomas Wotton	Thomas Parker	William Reeve	Nathaniel Cole	Edward Littleton	Thomas Simpson Jr.
1755	John March	Samuel Birt	Charles Hitch	John Hawys	Robert Jones	Nathaniel Cole	Edward Littleton	Richard Hett
1756	Francis Gosling	Thomas Wotton	Charles Hitch	Edward Nicholson	Marshall Sheepey	Nathaniel Cole	Edward Littleton	Richard Hett
1757	Thomas Wotton	Jacob Tonson	Dep. John Clarke	Thomas Longman	William Fenner	Nathaniel Cole	Edward Littleton	Richard Hett
1758	Charles Hitch	John Clarke	Allington Wilde	Robert Stevens	Paul Stevens	Nathaniel Cole	Edward Littleton	Richard Hett
1759	Jacob Tonson	Allington Wilde	Daniel Browne	Thomas Hooke	Bedwell Law	John Partridge	Edward Littleton	Richard Hett
1760	John Clarke	Daniel Browne	John Coles	Thomas Field	Charles Rivington	John Partridge	Edward Littleton	Richard Hett
1761	Allington Wilde	John Coles	Edward Say	John Gurr	John Johnson	John Partridge	Edward Littleton	Richard Hett
1762	John Coles	Edward Say	Richard Brooke	Thomas Pote	James Harrison	John Partridge	Edward Littleton	Richard Hett
1763	Edward Say	Richard Brooke	Richard Manby	Charles Corbett	William Richardson	John Partridge	Edward Littleton	Richard Hett
1764	Richard Brooke	Richard Manby	Henry Woodfall	James Fletcher	William Edwards	John Partridge	Edward Littleton	Richard Hett
1765	Richard Manby	Henry Woodfall	John Vowell	Edward Gilberd	John Curtis	John Partridge	Edward Littleton	Richard Hett
1766	Henry Woodfall	John Vowell	James Bailey	Edward Hasker	William Griffin	John Partridge	Edward Littleton	George Hawkins
1767	John Vowell	James Bailey	Matthew Jenour	Thomas Curtis	James Bate	John Partridge	Edward Littleton	George Hawkins
1768	James Bailey	Matthew Jenour	Paul Vaillant	John Payne	Archibald Hamilton	John Partridge	Edward Littleton	George Hawkins
1769	Matthew Jenour	Paul Vaillant	Thomas Gamull	William Davenhill	William Anderson	John Partridge	Edward Littleton	George Hawkins
1770	Paul Vaillant	Thomas Gamull	Joshua Jenour	Joseph Ellis	Humphrey Simmons	John Partridge	Edward Littleton	George Hawkins
1771	Thomas Gamull	Joshua Jenour	John Beecroft	John Nichols	Thomas Wright	John Partridge	Edward Littleton	George Hawkins
1772	Joshua Jenour	John Beecroft	Richard Walkden	Mathew Bloxam	Robert Marsh	John Partridge	Edward Littleton	George Hawkins
1773	John Beecroft	Richard Walkden	William Strahan	Matthew Brown	Samuel Simmons	John Partridge	Edward Littleton	George Hawkins
1774	William Strahan	John Rivington	Robert Brown	Francis Newberry	Samuel Brooke	John Partridge	Edward Littleton	George Hawkins
1775	John Rivington	Robert Brown	George Flower	Joseph Smith	John Henry Brown	John Partridge	Marshall Sheepey	George Hawkins
1776	Robert Brown	John Hinton	Daniel Richards	John Noorthouck	Samuel Hawksworth	Joseph Baldwin	Marshall Sheepey	George Hawkins
1777	Thomas Wright	George Flower	Lockyer Davis	John Crickitt	John French	Joseph Baldwin	Marshall Sheepey	George Hawkins
1778	Daniel Richards	Lockyer Davis	William Gill	Joseph Cooper	James Wallis Street	Joseph Baldwin	Marshall Sheepey	George Hawkins
1779	Lockyer Davis	William Gill	Robert Horsfield	Joseph Collyer	Thomas Ryder	Joseph Baldwin	Marshall Sheepey	George Hawkins
1780	William Gill	William Owen	Thomas Caslon	Nathaniel Wilkinson	John Smith	Joseph Baldwin	Marshall Sheepey	John Wilkie
1781	William Owen	Thomas Caslon	Thomas Harrison	James Neatby	George Mochell	Joseph Baldwin	Marshall Sheepey	John Wilkie
1782	Thomas Caslon	Thomas Harrison	Richard Hett	John Barnes	John William Galabin	Joseph Baldwin	Marshall Sheepey	John Wilkie
1783	John Boydell	Richard Hett	Robert Gyfford	John Rivington	William Lowndes	Joseph Baldwin	Marshall Sheepey	John Wilkie
1784	Thomas Harrison	Robert Gyfford	William Fenner	Daniel Constable	William Lane	Joseph Baldwin	Marshall Sheepey	John Wilkie
1785	Robert Gyfford	William Fenner	Thomas Greenhill	William Farlow	William Whitherby	Joseph Baldwin	Marshall Sheepey	Robert Horsfield
1786	William Fenner	Thomas Greenhill	Thomas Hooke	John Boydell	James Chapman	Joseph Baldwin	Thomas Millet	Robert Horsfield
1787	Thomas Greenhill	Thomas Hooke	Thomas Field	John Judge	Humphrey Gregory Pridden	Joseph Baldwin	Thomas Millet	Robert Horsfield
1788	Thomas Hooke	Thomas Field	Charles Rivington	Thomas Bensley	John Crickitt Jr.	Joseph Baldwin	Thomas Millet	Robert Horsfield
1789	Thomas Field	John March	Thomas Pote	James Shenton	Robert Bassam	Joseph Baldwin	Thomas Millet	Robert Horsfield
1790	John March	Thomas Pote	Henry Baldwin	Thomas Edwards	James Fox	Joseph Baldwin	Thomas Millet	Robert Horsfield
1791	Thomas Pote	Henry Baldwin	John Townsend	Wilford Tiffin	Charles Smith	Joseph Baldwin	Thomas Millet	Robert Horsfield
1792	Henry Baldwin	John Townsend	Henry Clarke	Charles Knight	Thomas Turner	Joseph Baldwin	Thomas Millet	Robert Horsfield
1793	Henry Clarke	William Chapman	Richard Welles	John Skirven	Henry Foudrinier	Joseph Baldwin	Thomas Millet	Robert Horsfield
1794	Henry Clarke	William Chapman	Richard Welles	John Lovejoy	Charles Lawrence	Joseph Baldwin	Thomas Millet	Robert Horsfield
1795	William Chapman	Richard Welles	Henry Sampson Woodfall	John Key	Henry Law	Joseph Baldwin	Thomas Millet	Robert Horsfield
1796	Richard Welles	Henry Sampson Woodfall	Thomas Curtis	James Black	Henry Lewis Galabin	Joseph Baldwin	Thomas Millet	Robert Horsfield
1797	Henry Sampson Woodfall	Thomas Curtis	James Bate	William Spilsbury	Charles Law	Joseph Baldwin	Thomas Millet	Robert Horsfield
1798	Thomas Cadell	James Bate	William Stephens	William Ginger	William Barron	Joseph Baldwin	Thomas Millet	George Greenhill
1799	James Bate	William Stephens	Henry Parker	William Francis Chapman	John Rider	Joseph Baldwin	Thomas Millet	George Greenhill

=== 1800–1899 ===
Nineteenth Century Masters, 1800–1899
Year elected	Name	Trade
1800	William Stephens	Law Stationer
1801	Henry Parker	Printer, Bookseller, Print-seller, Stationer
1802	Charles Dilly	Publisher, Bookseller
1803	William Domville	Bookseller, Stationer
1804	John Nichols	Printer
1805	Francis Rivington	Bookseller
1806	Mathew Bloxham	Stationer
1807	Thomas Vallance	Paper maker; Wholesale Stationer
1808	Henry Woolsey Byfield	Printer; Bookseller; Stationer
1809	Samuel Hawksworth	Printer, Bookseller, Stationer
1810	John Crickitt	Stationer; Marshall of the High Court of Admiralty
1811	Josiah Boydell	Publisher, Painter
1812	Thomas Smith	Bookbinder, Stock Broker
1813	John Barker	Printer
1814	James Wallis Street	Bookseller, Stationer
1815	Joseph Collyer	Engraver
1816	Christopher Magnay	Wholesale Stationer
1817	Thomas Payne	Bookseller
1818	Joseph Gardiner	Wholesale Stationer
1819	Charles Rivington	Publisher
1820	William Walker	Stationer, Tea-dealer
1821	William Witherby	Printer, Law Stationer
1822	Robert Davidson	Pocket-book-maker
1823	George Wilkie	Bookseller
1824	William Venables	Wholesale Stationer
1825	Thomas Bensley	Printer; Lithographer
1826	Richard Marsh	Fancy Stationer
1827	Thomas Turner	Paper-maker; Paper-hanging Manufacturer; Stationer
1828	James Harrison	Printer
1829	John Crowder	Printer
1830	John Key	Wholesale Stationer
1831	Roger Pettiward	Businessman; Antiquarian
1832	Joseph Baker	Map engraver
1833	George Woodfall	Printer
1834	Charles Fourdrinier	Wholesale Stationer
1835	Edward London Witts	Stationer
1836	Thomas Chapman	Printer; Bookseller
1837	William Barron	Stationer
1838	William Francis Chapman	Bookseller; Wholesale Stationer
1839	George Rowe	Fancy Stationer
1840	Thomas Steel	Law Stationer
1841	William Barron	Stationer
1842	Charles Baldwin	Printer
1843	Charles Baldwin	Printer
1844	Richard Bate	Merchant, Stationer
1845	William Carpenter	Printer
1846	John Walter	Printer; Proprietor of The Times
1847	William Magnay	Stationer
1848	John Lewis Cox	Printer to the East India Company
1849	Benjamin Gibbons	Wholesale Stationer
1850	John Bowyer Nichols	Printer
1851	Thomas Gardiner	Wholesale Stationer
1852	Thomas Taylor	Printer; Stationer; Coal-merchant
1853	William Farlow	Law Stationer
1854	Samuel Gyfford	Stationer
1855	Francis Graham Moon	Printseller; Publisher
1856	Nathaniel Graham	Bookseller; Grocer; Upholsterer
1857	John Dickinson	Paper-maker; Stationer
1858	John Dickinson	Paper-maker; Stationer
1859	John Saddington	Copperplate-printer; Stationer; Slop-seller
1860	Henry Foss	Bookseller
1861	James William Adlard	Printer
1862	Henry Foss	Bookseller
1863	John Simpson	Music publisher; Musical-instrument-maker; Music-seller
1864	James Daikers	Stationer
1865	Thomas Jones	Painter; Paper-hanger; Paper-maker; Stationer
1866	Edmund Hodgson	Book auctioneer; Stationer
1867	Edmund Hodgson	Book auctioneer; Stationer
1868	Henry Adlard	Printer; Engraver
1869	Henry Good	Stationer
1870	Henry George Brown	Stationer
1871	William Tyler	Wholesale Stationer
1872	Sydney Hedley Waterlow	Politician
1873	Francis Rivington	Bookseller
1874	William Watson	Printer; Bookbinder; Stationer
1875	William Good	Stationer
1876	Charles Rivington [died in office, succeeded by Henry George Brown]	
1876	Henry George Brown [succeeded Charles Rivington]	Stationer
1877	William Rivington	Printer; Bookseller
1878	George Chater	Wholesale Stationer
1879	Francis Wyatt Truscott	Wholesale Stationer
1880	James Figgins	Type-founder; Sheriff of London; Conservative MP
1881	Richard William Starkey	Wholesale Stationer
1882	Joseph Johnson Miles	
1883	John Miles	
1884	Charles Layton	
1885	Edmund Waller	
1886	Thomas Curson Hansard	Printer
1887	Francis Wyatt Truscott	Wholesale Stationer
1888	William Hawksworth	
1889	James George Alexander Diggens	
1890	James Evan Adlard [joint with Joseph Greenhill]	
1890	Joseph Greenhill [joint with James Evan Adlard]	
1891	George Singer	
1892	Guildford Barker Richardson	
1893	George Robert Tyler	Paper-maker
1894	Joshua Whitehead Butterworth [joint with Sir George Tyler]	
1894	George Robert Tyler [joint with Joshua Whitehead Butterworth]	Paper-maker
1895	Henry Sotheran	Bookseller
1896	William Richard Stephens	
1897	Charles John Clay	
1898	William Rider	Publisher
1899	Joseph Hunt	

=== 1900–1999 ===
Twentieth Century Masters, 1900–1999
Year elected	Name
1900	James William Harrison
1901	George Wyatt Truscott
1902	Matthew Thomas Roe [joint with John Miles]
1902	John Miles [joint with Matthew Thomas Roe]
1903	Thomas Vezey Strong
1904	George North-Cox
1905	John Ion
1906	Richard Stevens
1907	Henry Hill Hodgson
1908	Richard Webster Cox
1909	William Charles Knight Clowes
1910	George Chater
1911	Daniel Greenaway
1912	George Edward Briscoe Eyre
1913	Henry Hill
1914	Henry Good
1915	Herbert Jameson Waterlow
1916	Edward Hanslope Cox
1917	Horace Brooks Marshall
1918	John Bruce Nichols
1919	Edwin James Layton
1920	Edward Unwin
1921	Charles Robert Rivington
1922	Herbert Fitch
1923	Edward Pinney Vacher
1924	Richard Bentley
1925	Frederick Harris Miles
1926	George Rowland Blades
1927	Arthur William Rivington
1928	Cecil Reeves Harrison
1929	William Alfred Waterlow
1930	Edgar Erat Harrison
1931	John Henry Williams
1932	Percy Walter Greenaway
1933	Percy Walter Greenaway
1934	HRH The Prince of Wales [ Ralph David Blumenfeld, deputy]
1935	HRH The Prince of Wales [John William Davy, deputy]
1936	Robert Evan Adlard [joint with Sidney John Sandle]
1936	Sidney John Sandle [joint with Robert Evan Adlard]
1937	John William Baddeley [joint with Edward Manger Iliffe]
1937	Edward Manger Iliffe [joint with John William Baddeley]
1938	Henry Dexter Truscott [joint with Charles Felix Clay]
1938	Charles Felix Clay [joint with Henry Dexter Truscott]
1939	Edward Chenivix Austen-Leigh [joint with Edward Unwin]
1939	Edward Unwin [joint with Edward Chenivix Austen-Leigh]
1940	Edgar Lutwyche Waterlow [joint with Stanley Low]
1940	Stanley Low [joint with Edgar Lutwyche Waterlow]
1941	George Henry Wilkinson
1942	John Jacob Astor
1943	Herbert Arthur Cox
1944	Charles John Watts
1945	Robert Kingston Burt
1946	Herbert William Jordan
1947	Victor Bobardt Harrison
1948	Bernard Guy Harrison
1949	Sidney Hodgson
1950	Reginald Thurston Rivington
1951	Arthur George Fowler
1952	Charles Clifton Tollit
1953	William Will
1954	Richard Arthur Austen-Leigh
1955	William Penman
1956	Cuthbert Grasemann
1957	Victor Robert Penman
1958	George Percival Simon
1959	Denis Henry Truscott
1960	James Edward Ousey
1961	William Henry Young
1962	John Betts
1963	John Mylne Rivington
1964	James Alexander Bailey
1965	Henry Arthur Johnson
1966	Donald Fores Kellie
1967	Henry Frank Thompson
1968	Charles Arthur Rivington
1969	John Hubbard
1970	Eric Burt
1971	Philip Soundy Unwin
1972	George Low Riddell
1973	Alan Pearce Greenaway
1974	Derek Burdick Greenaway
1975	Leonard Entwisle Kenyon
1976	Jack Matson
1977	Edward Glanvill Benn
1978	Brian Trevena Coulton
1979	Wilfrid Becket Hodgson
1980	Kenneth Buckingham Robinson
1981	David Wyndham Smith
1982	Peter Cox
1983	Christopher Rivington
1984	Laurence Viney
1985	Ray Tindle
1986	Allen Thompson
1987	Mark Tollit
1988	John Leighton
1989	Desmond Ryman
1990	Thomas Corrigan
1991	William Young
1992	George Mandl
1993	Peter Rippon
1994	Richard Haselden
1995	Alan Brooker
1996	Roy Fullick
1997	Clive Martin
1998	Vernon Sullivan
1999	Richard Harrison

=== 2000–present ===
Twenty-first Century Masters, 2000–
Year elected	Name
2000	Henry Frank Chappell
2001	Robert J Russell
2002	Michael A Pelham
2003	Jonathan Straker
2004	James Benn
2005	Patrick Shorten
2006	Neville Cusworth
2007	John W Waterlow
2008	Noel Osborne
2009	Richard Brewster
2010	Christopher McKane
2011	Nigel Stapleton
2012	Kevin Dewey
2013	Tom Hempenstall
2014	Ian Locks
2015	Helen Esmonde
2016	Ian Bennett
2017	Nick Steidl
2018	David Allan
2019	Trevor Fenwick
2020	Stephen Platten
2021	Robert Flather
2022	Moira Sleight
2023	Anthony Mash
2024	Paul Wilson
2025	Doug Wills
2026	Ian Leggett

== Young Stationers' Prize ==
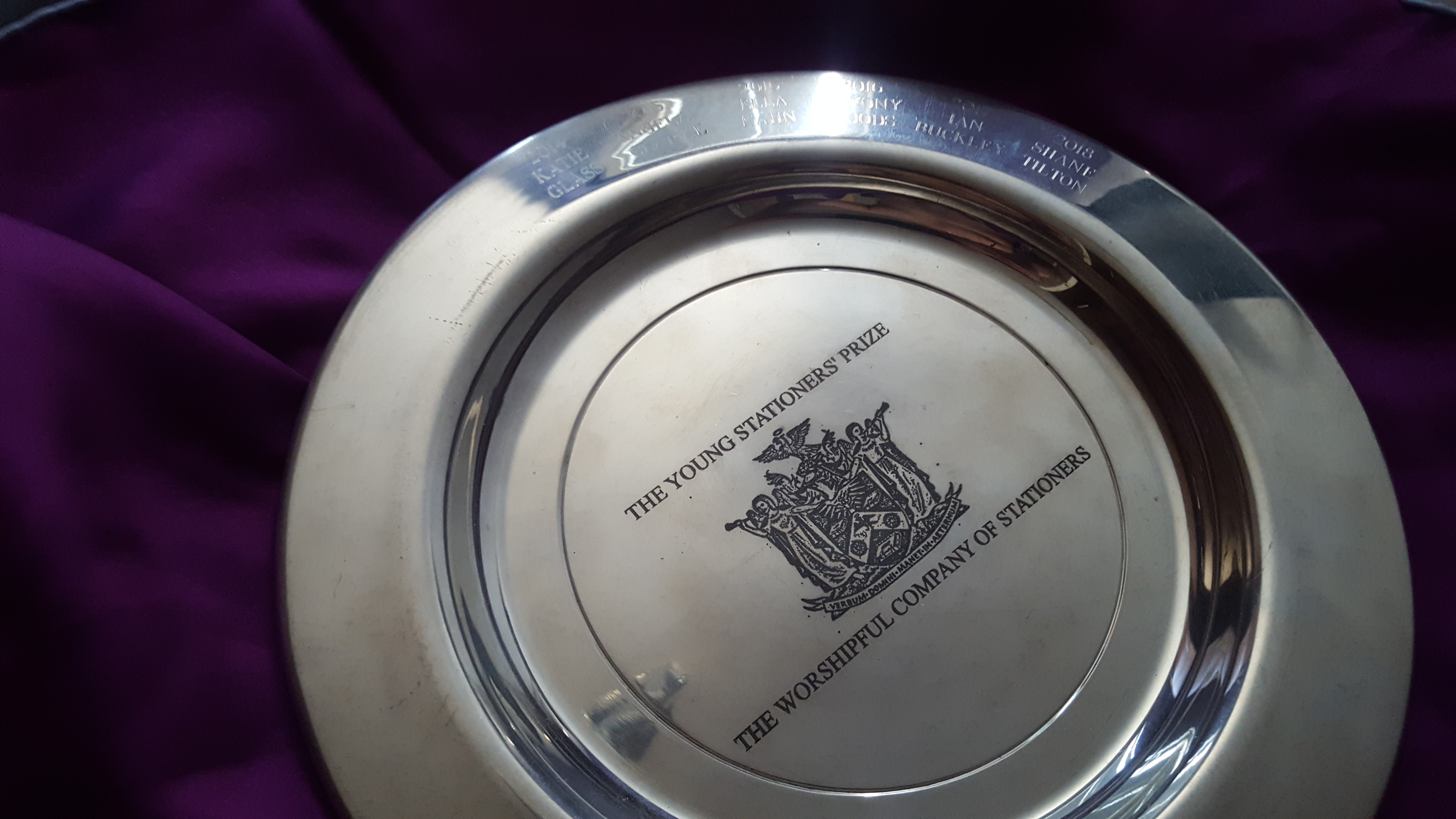
Young Stationers' Prize with engraved winners as of 2018

The "Young Stationers' Prize" is an annual prize awarded by the Young Stationers' Committee to a young person under 40 years of age who has distinguished themself within the company's trades. Launched in 2014, the prize is a pewter plate (donated by the Worshipful Company of Pewterers) onto which each winner's name is engraved.

=== List of Young Stationers' Prize winners ===
As of December 2019 there have been seven winners of the Young Stationers' Prize: Katie Glass, journalist, 2014; Angela Clarke, novelist, playwright, and columnist, 2015; Ella Kahn and Bryony Woods, founders of Diamond Kahn & Woods Literary Agency (awarded jointly), 2016; Ian Buckley, managing director of Prima Software, 2017; Shane Tilton, academic and professor of multimedia journalism, 2018; Amy Hutchinson, CEO of the BOSS Federation, 2019.

== Arms ==
Coat of arms of Worshipful Company of Stationers and Newspaper Makers
Crest On a wreath of the colours, An eagle, wings expanded, with a diadem above its head, perched on a book fessewise, all Or. Escutcheon Azure, on a chevron between three books with clasps, all Or an eagle volant gules with a nimbus Or, between two roses gules leaved vert, in chief issuing out of a cloud proper radiated Or a Holy Spirit, wings displayed, argent with a nimbus Or. Supporters On either side an angel proper, vested argent, mantled azure, winged and blowing a trumpet Or. Motto 'Verbum Dei manet in aeternum'

== See also ==
- Authorized King James Version
- Eyre & Spottiswoode
- Fleet Street
- Printing patent
