= Queens' Binder =

Queens' Binder (or Queen's Binder) is the name given to a small group of English bookbinders active during the Restoration period (1660 – c. 1700), often called the "Golden Age of English Bookbinding".

== Etymology ==
The name derives from the fact that similar bookbindings were found in the libraries of both Catherine of Braganza and Mary of Modena. The term was first coined by G. D. Hobson in his book Bindings in Cambridge Libraries and was a convenient term to refer to the characteristic drawer-handle tools and volutes with pointillé outlines rather than floral volutes much used by the other binders of the period.

== Subtypes ==
H. M. Nixon subdivided the bindings into three groups, Queens' Binder A, B, and C, due to the slight variations between them. Queens' Binder A is the most prolific of the three, but Queens' Binder B is considered the finer artisan. Although the bookbinders have not all been definitively identified, there is strong grounds for considering Samuel & Charles Mearne, Roger Bartlett, and William Nott as being at least partially responsible.
