= Robert Clavell =

British bookseller

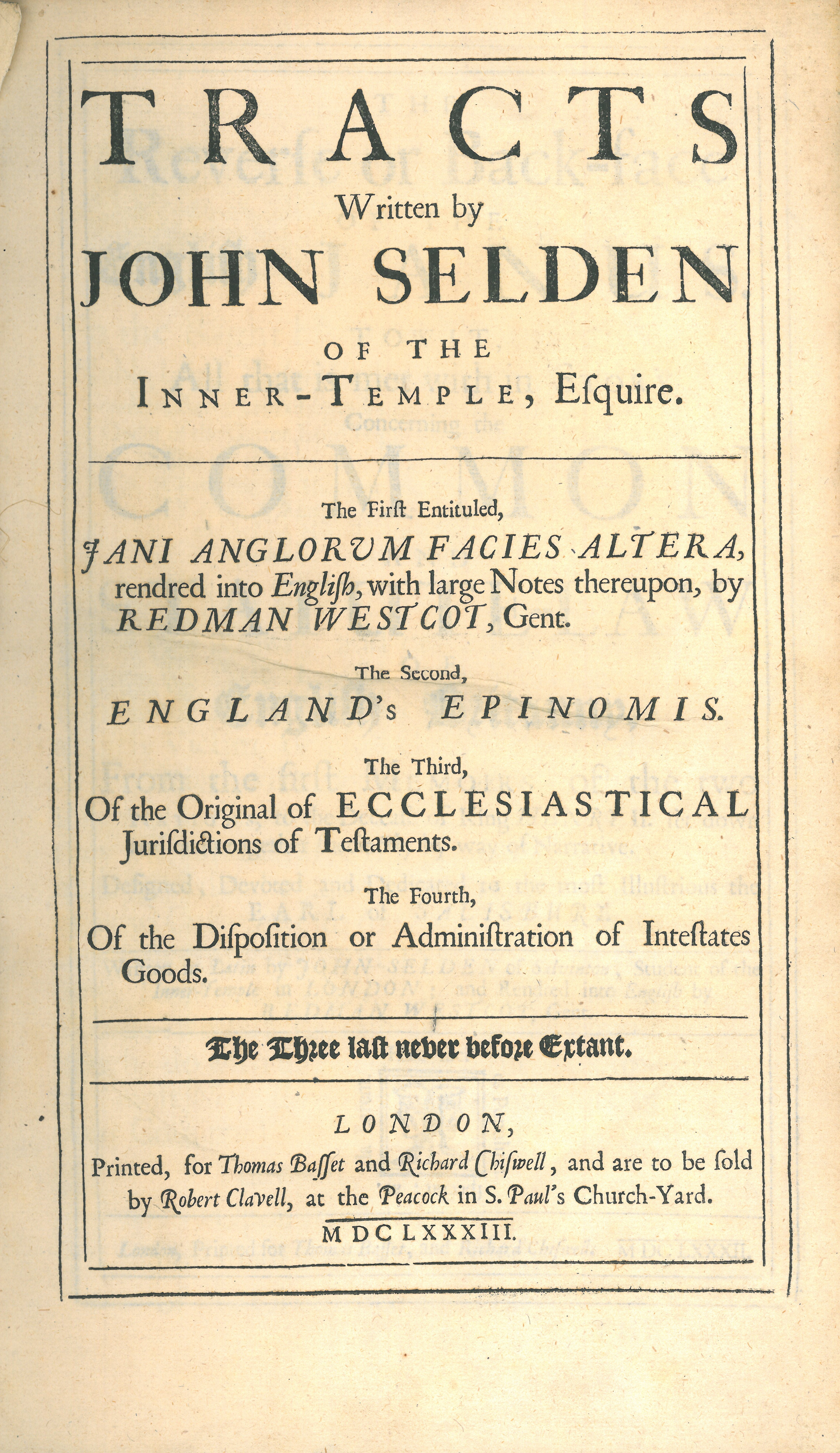
The title page of Tracts Written by John Selden of the Inner-Temple (1683), indicating that copies were sold by Clavell "at the Peacock in S. Paul's Church-Yard"

Robert Clavell (born in or before 1633 – died before 8 August 1711), was a bookseller of London. He was born in Steeple, Dorset, of a branch of an old Dorsetshire family, being baptised there on 18 September 1632.

Clavell was the author of a curious little treatise entitled His Majesties Propriety and Dominion on the British Seas asserted: together with a true Account of the Neatherlanders' Insupportable Insolencies, and Injuries they have committed; and the Inestimable Benefits they have gained in their Fishing on the English Seas: as also their Prodigious and Horrid Cruelties in the East and West Indies, and other Places. To which is added an exact Mapp, &c., octavo, London, 1665 (another edition, octavo, London, 1672).

He is better known, however, as the central organiser of the term catalogues that appeared in London between 1668 and 1711.

John Dunton describes Clavell as "a great dealer, who has deservedly gained himself the reputation of a just man. Dr. Barlow, bishop of Lincoln, used to call him 'the honest bookseller'. He has been master of the Company of Stationers [1698 and 1699]; and perhaps the greatest unhappiness of his life was his being one of Alderman Cornish's jury" (Life and Errors, ed. 1818, i. 207).

He died at Islington in 1711 (Probate Act Book, P.C.C., August 1711). His will, as "citizen and stationer of London", dated 17 April 1711, was proved on the following 8 August by Catherine Clavell, his widow (registered in P.C.C. 161, Young). Mrs. Clavell survived her husband until the close of 1717, dying in the parish of St. Margaret, Westminster (will registered in P.C.C. 227, Whitfield; Probate Act Book, P.C.C. December 1717).
