= List of early-modern periodicals =

The list of early-modern periodicals gives an overview of periodicals (newspapers are excluded) for the period from the first printed books to 1800. The list includes periodical publications such as catalogues and some works which appeared in a longer time frame, such as the Theatrum Europaeum.

== Established 1600–1699 ==
Period	Title	Language	Responsibilities	Publishing history
1564–1749	Novorum Librorum quos Nundinae Atumnales, Francoforti Anno 1564 celebratae, Venales Exhibuerent (Frankfort Messkatalog)	German	Georg Willer	Published by Georg Willer, Augsburg, the first of the two series. First appearance at the Frankfort book fair Michaelmass 1564, series ended in 1749.
1594–1860	[Leipzig Messkatalog]	German		Initially published by Henning Große, later by his heirs, from 1759 onwards with the Weidmannsche Buchhandlung, then with several publishers until the end of the series in 1860. A crisis began in 1797, with the appearance of the Hinrichssche Halbjahrkatalog. Restructured in 1760: New arrangement with a look at the academic subjects and an alphabetic order of titles.
1614–1619?	[Mainz Catholic Messkatalog]	German		Competed with the Frankfurt Term Catalogues (1564–1749)
1617–1628	[London edition of the half-yearly Frankfort Mess-Katalog (1564–), which he continued for about eleven years, and to which, from 1622 to 1626, was added a supplement of "Books printed in English".]	English		London: John Bill
1633, 1650, 1658, 1684	Acerra Philologica Das ist/ Zwey hundert außerlesenen/ nützliche/ lustige/ und denckwürdige Historien und Discursen, zusammen gebracht aus den berühmten Griechischen und Lateinischen Scribenten : Darin enthalten/ Die meisten Gedichte der Poeten/ von Göttern/ und Göttinnen: von Helden/ und Heldinnen ....; Alle Liebhabern der Historien zur Ergetzung: Insonderheit der studierenden Jugent zur mercklichen Ubung ... beforderlich	German	Peter Lauremberg	Not immediately a Journal: Initiated in 1633 in Rostock; published by Halerfordt, several new editions, continued with Joachim Wilde in Rostock, increased to 400 histories after the authors death in 1650; 1658 since under the ne title: Newe und vermehrte Acerra philologica, Das ist: Sechs Hundert außerlesene nützliche lustige und denckwürdige Historien und Discursen auß den berümbtesten Griechischen und Lateinischen Scribenten zusammen getragen Cleve: Silberling, 1658. Enlarged in 1684 to 650 histories, in 1688 to 700. A new project began in 1692 under the title Neue Acerra Biblica, Das ist Hundert Auserlesene, nützliche, lustige und denckwürdige Historien und Oerter Der Heil. Schrifft The Acerra Philologica was a Journal under this title during 1715–1734.
1633–1738	Theatrum Europaeum	German		Successive recapitulation of Europe's history
1663–1781	Histoire de l'Académie Royale des Inscriptions et Belles-Lettres avec les Mémoires de littérature tirez des registres de cette Académie : depuis l'année ... jusques & compris l'année ..	French	Académie des Inscriptions et Belles-Lettres	Paris : Panckoucke, 1663–1781; 1718: La Haye : Troyel, 1.1663/1710 - 19.1773/76(1781); discontinued with that number; Italian translation under the title La Storia delle opere dell'Accademia Reale delle Iscrizioni e delle Belle Lettere (1731), German: Geschichte der königlichen Akademie der schönen Wissenschaften zu Paris : darinnen zugleich unzählige Abhandlungen aus allen freyen Künsten, gelehrten Sprachen, und Alterthümern enthalten sind. / Aus dem Französischen übersetzt. Mit einer Vorrede ans Licht gestellet von Johann Christoph Gottsched (Leipzig : Krauß, 1747–1757).
1665 till today	Philosophical Transactions of the Royal Society	English	Royal Society	
1665–1670	Ephemerides eruditorum	Latin		Lipsiae; Francofurti : Schürer & Fritzsch 1.1665(1667) - 5.1669/70(1671); discontinued with that number; Extract from Journal des savants
1665–1792; 1797–1797; 1816–1835; 1836–1902; 1903–1933	Journal des Sçavans	French		Paris 1.1665/66 - 1792; [1.Sér.] Nr. 1.1797 - 12.1797; [2.Sér.] 1.1816 - 20.1835; 3.Sér. 1.1836 - 67.1902; N.S.=[4.Sér.] 1.1903 - 23.1925; 1926–1933.
1668–1681	Il Giornale de'letterati	Italian		Parma: 1.1668 - 1681/ 1692[?], later without numbering the issues
1668–1711	Term Catalogues	English	John Starkey, Robert Clavell	4 issues per year, several series
1670–1706	Miscellanea Curiosa Medico-Physica Academiae Naturae Curiosorum sive Ephemeridum Medico-Physicarum Germanicarum Curiosarum Annus Primus Anni scilicet M.DC.LXXmi. : continens Celeberrimorum Medicorum in & extra Germaniam Observationes Medicas & Physicas, vel Anatomicas, vel Botanicas, vel Pathologicas, vel Chirurgicas, vel Therapeuticas, vel Chymicas; Praefixa Epistola Invitatoria ad Celeberrimos Medicos Europae	Latin	I. M. Lerch Lorenzo Magalotti N. Gäublin, Corporate body: Sacri Romani Imperii Academia Caesareo-Leopoldina Naturae Curiosorum	Leipzig : Veit Jakob Trescher and Johann Bauer, 1.Decuria 1.1670 - 10.1679; 2.Decuria 1.1682 - 10.1691; 3.Decuria 1.1694 - 10.1706. Continuation: Sacri Romani Imperii Academia Caesareo-Leopoldina Naturae Curiosorum: Academiae Caesareo-Leopoldinae [Naturae Curiosorum] Natvrae Cvriosorvm ephemerides (1712–1722)
1672–1674; 1678–1714	Mercure Galant	French		Monthly publication, continuation: Nouveau Mercure galant (1714–1724), und dann als Mercure de France (1724–1825)
1673–1686	Le mercure Hollandois, contenant les choses les plus remarquables de toute la terre, arrivees en l'an 1672 jusqu'alan 1673, et sur tout dans les guerres de France, Angleterre et Hollande	French		Amsterdam : Boom, 1672/73(1678) - 1684(1686)[?]
1674–1675	Götter-Both Mercurius	German		Nürnberg: Wolf Eberhard Felsecker
1676–1680	Erbauliche Ruh-Stunden	German	Johann Frisch	Wöchentlich, 219 Stück
1679–1682	Philosophical collections, containing an account of such physical, anatomical, chymical, ... experiments and observations as have lately come to the publishers hands. As also an account of some books of this kind lately published.	English	Royal Society	London [England] : printed for John Martyn, printer to the Royal Society, 1679–1682. Numb. 1. ([1679])-numb. 7. (April 1682). Monthly, No.3-7 (1681:Dec.-1682:Apr.)
1680–1682	Deliciae medico-chirurgicae, oder Medicinisch- und chirurgische Ergötzlichkeiten, in sich haltend die merckwürdigsten medicinischen und chirurgischen Zufälle, so sich in der Medicin und Chirurgie ereignen / entworffen von Steven Blanckaert	German	Johann Frisch	Dantzig : Möller 1.1680(1736) - 3.1682(1736)[?]
1681	A Collection of letters for the improvement of husbandry & trade	English	John Houghton, Fellow of the Royal Society	[London, England] : Printed for John Lawrence, at the Angel in Cornhill near the Royal Exchange. Numb. 1. (Thursday, Sept. 8. 1681.), Ceased with: Vol. 2, no. 6 (June 16, 1684).
1682–1731	Acta Eruditorum	Latin	Otto Mencke, Mitarbeiter: Johann Benedict Carpzov II., Friedrich Benedict Carpzov, Joachim Feller, Gottfried Olearius (1672–1715), Valentin Alberti, Adam Rechenberg, Thomas Ittigius, Johannes Cyprian, Johann Schmid, Johann Georg Abicht, Christian Friedrich Börner, Gottlieb Gerhard Titius, Götzius, Ludwig Christian Crell, Johann Hübner.	Lipsiae: Grosse & Gleditsch 1682–1731; Indices generales: Lipsiae: Grosse & Gleditsch 1.1682/91(1693) - 5.1722/31(1733); 6.1732/41; discontinued with that number.
1682–1683	Weekly memorials for the ingenious: or, An account of books lately set forth in several languages (London, England : Faithorne : Weekly).	English		London [England] : printed for Henry Faithorne and John Kersey, at the Rose in St. Paul's Church-yard, 1682–1683. Munday, January 16. 1681/2-Munday, January 15. 1683.
1682	Weekly memorials for the ingenious: or, An Account of books lately set forth in several languages (London, England : Chiswell).	English	Editorship attributed to ’Mr. Beaumont’, the editor of the first 10 numbers of an earlier paper with the same title (MS. note in Bodley copy).	[London, England] : Sold by R[ichard]. Chiswell in S. Pauls Church-yard. W. Crook without Temple-bar. S. Crouch at the corner of Popes-head-ally in Cornhil. G. Kunholt over against the Mews near Charing-cross, 1682. Numb. 1. (Munday, March 20. 1681/2. [i.e. 1682])-Numb. 29. (Munday, Sept. 25. 1682.).
1683–1684	Merlinus Redivivus: Being an Almanack for the Year of our Redemption, 1683. By John Partridge, Student in Physick and Astrology	English	John Partridge	monthly
1684–1689; 1699–1710 –1718	Nouvelles de la république des lettres	French	1684–1689: Pierre Bayle, 1699–1710 Jaques Bernard	1.1684, Jan./Febr.: Mercure sçavant. Initially: Amsterdam : Desbordes, folgend Amsterdam : Mortier, 1684–1718. 1.1684, March - 40.1718, May/June; discontinued with that number;
1684	Medicina curiosa: Or, a variety of new communications in physick, chirurgery, and anatomy, from the ingenious of many parts of Europe, and some other parts of the world.	English		London [England] : printed for Tho. Basset at the George in Fleet-street, [1684]. Numb. 1. (June 17. 1684.)-num. 2. (October 23. 1684.)
1685–1686	Jugemens des Scavans Sur Les Principaux Ouvrages Des Auteurs	French	Adrien Baillet (1649–1706)	Paris : Antoine Dezallier, 1685–1686
1686–1693; 1713; 1718	Bibliothèque universelle et historique	French	Jean Le Clerc	Initial: 25 volumes. (Amsterdam: Wolfgang, Waesberge, Boom, & van Someren;; Henry Schelte). Overlapping editions: 1st edition 1786–1794; 2nd edition 1787–1700. First continuation: 28 volumes. Bibliothèque choisie (Amsterdam: Henry Shelte, 1703–1713). Second continuation: 29 volumes. Bibliothèque ancienne et moderne (Amsterdam: David Mortier;; les Freres Wetstein, 1714–1726).
1686–1782	Mercure historique et politique : contenant l'état présent de l'Europe	French	1684–1689: Pierre Bayle, 1699–1710 Jaques Bernard	Initially: Parme [i.e. La Haye] : Batanar; La Haye : Staatman, 1.1686 - 192.1782[?], 6.1689, Jan.: Mémoire de ce qui se passe de plus considérable dans toutes les cours de l'Europe. 1781,1-5: Mercure historique, politique et litteraire.
1687–1689	Histoire des ouvrages des sçavans	French	Henri Basnage de Beauval	Rotterdam : Leers, 1.1687, Sept. - 24.1709, June
1687	The Universal historical bibliothèque: or An account of most of the considerable books printed in all languages in the month of ...	English	Jean Cornand de Lacroze, R. Bohun	London [England] : printed for George Wells, at the Sun in S. Paul's Church-Yard, 1687. Monthly, January, 1686. [i.e. 1687]-March, 1686. [i.e. 1687] continued as The History of learning: or, An abstract of several books lately published 1691.
1688–1690	Schertz- und Ernsthaffter, Vernünfftiger und Einfältiger Gedancken, über allerhand Lustige und nützliche Bücher und Fragen [T. 1]: Erster Monath oder Januarius : in einem Gespräch vorgestellet von der Gesellschaft derer Müßigen	German	Christian Thomasius, the issues that appeared in 1690 Ausgaben till April are said to have been written by Johann Jacob von Ryssel (1627–1699).	Frankfurt; Leizig: Moritz Georg Weidmann, slight changes of the title's wording.
1689–1689	Monatliche Erzehlungen allerhand künstlicher und natürlicher Curiositäten : unter einer anmuthigen Romaine, aus den neuesten Büchern herauß gezogen und mit eigener Erfahrung bewähret	German	Christian Thomasius (1655–1728)	Leipzig : Verl. d. Saarischen Erben
1689–1698	Monatliche Unterredungen einiger guten Freunde von allerhand Büchern und andern annemlichen Geschichten / allen Liebhabern der Curiositäten zur Ergetzligkeit und Nachsinnen heraus gegeben	German	Wilhelm Ernst Tentzel (1659–1707)	[Leipzig] : Laurer, [1689–1698], continuation: Curieuse Bibliothec, oder, Fortsetzung der Monatlichen Unterredungen (1704–1706)
1689	Weekly memorials: or, An Account of books lately set forth; with other accounts relating to learning.	English		London [England] : printed by J. R. and are to be sold by B. Corbet, at the Bulls Head in Butcher-Hall-Lane, 1688. [i.e. 1689]. Semiweekly. Numb. 1. (Saturday, January 19. 1688. [1689])
1690–1705	Deliciae Biblicae Oder Biblische Ergetzligkeiten : Worinnen Alle Curieuse merck- und Denckwürdige/ zweiffelhaffte Oerter/ Sprüche und Fragen/ ... Durch die gantze Bibel fortgesetzet/ und ... von Monat zu Monat einige Bogen heraus gegeben werden / von Misandern	German	Johann Samuel Adami (1638–1713)	Dreßden; Leipzig : Mieth 1690–1705
1690–1739	Europische Mercurius	Dutch	E. V.	Amsterdam published by the author, sold by ten Hoorn; continuation: Nederlandsch gedenkboek of Europische Mercurius (1740–1759)
1690–1715	Nouvelle Bibliothèque des auteurs ecclésiastiques. Contenant l'histoire de leur vie, le catalogue, la critiques, et la chronologie de leurs ouvrages. Le sommaire de ce qu'ils contiennent. Un jugement sur leur stile et sur leur doctrine. Et le denombrement de differents éditions de leurs oeuvres / par L. Ellies Dupin	French	Louis Ellies Du Pin (1657–1719)	Paris : André Pralard; Mons : Pierre Huguetan, T. 4-6; Mons : Migot, T. 7; Amsterdam : Pierre Humbert, T. 15–19, 1691–1715
1691–1697	The Athenian gazette The Athenian Mercury. Resolving weekly all the most nice and curious questions propos’d by the ingenious.	English	Mainly the work of John Dunton, assisted by Richard Sault and Samuel Wesley, the elder.	The Athenian gazette London, printed for P. Smart, 1690 [i.e. 1691], Numb. 1 (Tuesday, March, 17th. 1690 [i.e. 1691]) The Athenian mercury London, printed for P. Smart, 1690 [i.e. 1691]-1697, [Vol.1] Numb. 2 (Tuesday, March, 24th. 1690 [i.e. 1691])-vol.20 numb.10 (Monday, June 14. 1697)
1691	The History of learning: or, An abstract of several books lately published, as well abroad, as at home. By one of the two authors of the Universal and Historical Bibliothèque.	English	Jean Cornand de Lacroze, d. ca. 1705.	London [England] : printed for Abel Swalle, and Timothy Childe, at the Unicorn at the west-end of St. Paul's Church-Yard, 1691. [July 1691].
1692–1701	De Boekzaal van Europe	Dutch	P. Rabus	Rotterdam, 1692–1701, continuations: Tweemaandelijke uittreksels (1701–1704), De Boekzaal der geleerde werelt (1705–1708) and Maandelyksche uittreksels of boekzaal der geleerde waereld (1715–1802)
1692–1699	Deliciae Biblicae, Oder Biblische Ergetzlichkeiten : Welche aus dem Innhalt der Worte/ sonderlich Des Neuen Testaments/ des Herrn Jesu/ zusammen und darzu viele Curieuse, merck- und denckwürdige Naturalien/ Historien/ Medaillen und dergleich Dinge getragen ... Zu Beförderung Christlicher Andacht/ Discursen/ Gespräche und Fragen/ ... / heraus giebet Theophilus Rabanus Savreda	German	Theophilus Rabanus Savreda	Leipzig: David Fleischer, 1692–1699
1692–1697	Frühlings-, Sommer-, Herbst- und Winter-Parnaß oder Abhandlung von viertzig galant-gelehrten Curiositäten, meist nach jetziger Zeit neuesten Begebenheiten : als: vier Novellen oder neue und rare Begebenheiten aus den vier Theilen der Welt, mit vergnüglichen Reflexionen; acht galante und kurtze Memoiren oder Lebens-Gedächtnüsse	German	Gottfried Zenner (1656–1721)	Franckfurt; Leipzig : Boetius 1.1692–1697[?], Zenner's name began the titles since 1694: Gottfried Zenners ... Parnaß ...
1692–1692	Ephemeridum Philologicarvm Discursus I. : De Ala Templi Hierosolymitani; Ab Hermanno von der Hardt ... in gratiam Auditoris ac Commensalis sui Henric-Lohalmi Meyer, Luneburgensis, privatim institutus; In communem v. Studiosorum usum publici juris factus	Latin	Hermann von der Hardt (1660–1746)	Helmestadii : Hammius, 1692
1692–1739	Neue Acerra Biblica, Das ist Hundert Auserlesene, nützliche, lustige und denckwürdige Historien und Oerter Der Heil. Schrifft : Allen Liebhabern des Worts Gottes zur Ergetzung und Erbauung: sonderlich denen, welche die H. Schrifft studiren wollen, oder schon studiren, Zu sonderbahren Unterricht ... Aus den bewerthesten Theologis ... erkläret und ausgeführet / durch M. Johann Müllern, Pfarrern und Superintendenten zu Jessen	German	Johann Müller (1648–1696), Ernst Christian Schroedter (ca. 1675–1758)	After the third hundred continued by Ernst Christian Schrödter until 1739. Leipzig: Wohlfart [u.a.], 1692–1739
1692–1697	Novellen aus der gelehrten und curiösen Welt	German	Gottfried Zenner	Franckfurt (usw.) 1692–1697. 6 vols.
1693–1700	Fasciculus ... opusculorum quae ad historiam ac philologiam sacram spectant	Latin	Ed.: Thomas Crenius i.e. Thomas Theodor Crusius	Rotterodami: apud Petrum vander Slaart, Fasciculum 1.1693 till 10.1700
1693–1693	Historia Sapientiæ Et Stultitiæ / collecta à Christiano Thomasio, JCto	Latin	Christian Thomasius (1655–1728)	Halæ Magdeburgicæ : Christoph Salfeld, 1693
1693–1693	Historie der Weißheit und Thorheit	German	Christian Thomasius (1655–1728)	Halæ Magdeburgicæ : Christoph Salfeld, 1693, Theil 1 – 3, translation of the Latin original
1693–1693	The Ladies mercury	English		London [England] : printed for T. Pratt, 1693. Weekly. Vol. I. Numb. 1. (Munday, February 28. 1693.)-vol. I. numb. 4. (Friday, March 17. 1693.).
1693–1699	Bibliotheca librorum novorum / collecta a L. Neocoro et Hnr. Sikio	Latin	L. Neocorus i.e. Ludolf Kuester (1670–1716), Heinrich Sike (1669–1712), the first volumes were a joint venture. From vol. 5 onwards only Sike	Trajecti ad Rh. : Halman; van de Water, 1697–1699
1694–1696	Journal de Hambourg contenant divers mémoires curieux et utiles sur toute sorte de sujets	French		Hambourg, 1.1694 - 4.1696[?]
1695–1713	Thomae Crenii animadversiones philologicae et historicae : novas librorum editiones, praefationes, indices, nonullasque summorum aliquot virorum labeculas notatas excutientes ...;	Latin	Ed.: Thomas Crenius i.e. Thomas Theodor Crusius	Roterodami: Ruynen, 1695, Ps.1.1695 till Lugduni Batavorum: Mijn, 1713, Ps. 18.
1696–1703	Des Franzöischen Helicons Monat-Früchte/ Oder getreue Ubersetzungen und Auszüge allerhand curiöser und auserlesener Franzöischen Schrifften/ Von Staats- Welt- und Liebes-Händeln/ wie auch andern Moralischen/ Geographischen und dergleichen lesenswürdigen Materien / zu vergönnter Gemüths-Ergötzung überreichet im ... von Talandern	German	Talander i.e. August Bohse (1661–1740)	[Leipzig] : Johann Ludwig Gleditsch, 1696–1703
1697–1697	Des Träumenden Pasquini kluger Staats-Phantasien Uber den ietzigen verwirreten Zustand der Welt: ... Erscheinung : Allen curieusen und Staats-verständigen Gemüthern zu fernerem Nachdencken zugeeignet und übergeben	German	Philipp Balthasar Sinold von Schütz (1657–1742)	Freyburg: Wahrmund, 1697, 1.–3. Erscheinung. Continued in 1699
1697–1760	Europäische Staats-Cantzley : darinnen zum Behuff der neuesten politischen-, Kirchen- und Reichshistorie was sowohl in Religions-Angelegenheiten merckwürdiges vorgefallen als in Staats- und Reichs-Geschäfften vor kurztem abgehandelt worden und zum Vorschein gekommen ist / in richtiger Ordnung vorgetragen und ohnparteyisch mitgetheilt von Anton Faber	German	Christian Leonhard Leucht	Frankfurt, M.; Leipzig; Nürnberg : Weber, 1.1697 – 115.1760
1698, 1708	Das Courieuse Caffee-Haus zu Venedig : Darinnen die Mißbräuche und Eitelkeiten der Welt/ nebst Einmischung verschiedener so wol zum Staat als gemeinem Leben gehörige Merckwürdigkeiten/ vermittelst einiger ergötzlicher Assembléen von allerhand Personen/ vorgestellet/ Allen honetten und Tugendliebenden Gemüthern aber zu fernerem Nachsinnen übergeben worden	German	Philipp Balthasar Sinold von Schütz (1657–1742)	Freyburg [i.e. Leipzig] : Wahrmundt [i.e. Groschuff], 1698; continuation: Das Neue und Curiöse Caffee-Hauß, vormahls in Italien, nunmehro aber in Teutschland, eröffnet, Teil: 2. Wasser Debauche: Das Neue und Curiöse Caffé-Hauß, Leipzig: Georgi, 1708.
1698–1701	Der Fliehende Passagier Durch Europa : Welcher die remarquablesten Staats- und Privat-Händel/ nebst einigen darüber geführten Raisonnements mittheilet	German	Philipp Balthasar Sinold von Schütz (1657–1742)	Freystad i.e.: [Leipzig] : [Gleditsch], 1st Promenande 1698, 10th Promenade 1701
1698–1709	Monatlicher Staats-Spiegel : Worinnen alles Merckwürdige/ so in Europa vorgehet/ absonderlich die im Heil. Röm. Reich vorfaende Geschäfften ... Mit dazu gehörigen curiosen Beylagen ... zu sehen und anzutreffen; Auf den Monat	German	Stanislaus Reinhard Acxtelmeier (1649–)	Augspurg : Andreas Maschenbauer, Daniel Walder, Jakob Koppmayer 1698–1709, continued as Neu-eröffneter Welt- und Staatsspiegel (1709–1716)
1698–1708	Nova literaria Maris Balthici et Septentrionis	Latin	Jacob von Melle, Achilles Daniel Leopold, Caspar Heinrich Starck	Lubecae; Lipsiae : Stock; Lubecae : Venator [u.a.], 1698–1708, 1698, 1703: Lubecae : Böckmann
1699–1703	Aufgefangene Brieffe, welche zwischen etzlichen curieusen Personen über den jetzigen Zustand der Staats- und gelehrten Welt gewechselt worden	German	Andreas Stübel (1653–1725)	Wahrenburg [d.i. Leipzig] : Freymund [d.i.Groschuff]; issues in three "Ravages" each of 12 Pacquets 1699–1703, Continuation: Der neubestellte Agent (1704–1709) and Der mit allerhand Staats- Friedens- Kriegs- Hof- Literatur- und Religions- wie auch Privat-Affairen beschäfftigte Secretarius
1699–1700	Curieuses Reise-Journal : eines, welcher ohnlängst die Welt zu sehen angefangen, von alle dem was ihme so wohl von Staats- als andern Sachen wie auch von allerhand Schrifften und neuen Büchern auf seiner Reise tägl. remarquables u. curieuses vorfället; allen, welche d. Staatsklugheit lieben ... mitgetheilet	German		[S.l.] 1699/1700; discontinuead after that number.
1699	Die Lustige und denckwürdige Correspondence : welche Den thörichten Lauff der Welt und die seltzamen Intriguen der Menschen mit nachdrücklichen Vorstellungen eröffnet	German		Freyburg: Wahrmund; [Leipzig] : Friedrich Groschuff, 1699, 1. Staffetta – 3. Staffetta, Continuation: Pasquini geheime Brieff-Tasche (1708–1710)
1699–1707	Historische Remarques über neuesten Sachen in Europa des ... Jahres	German	Peter A. Lehmann	Initially: Hamburg : Reumann, then Hamburg : Sennagel, 1699,1(Jan.3)-52(Dec.26.); 2. 1700,1(Jan.2) - 9.1707,52[?]
1699–1709	Joh. Sam. Adami, sonst Misanders, Deliciæ Evangelicæ, d.i. Vorrath solcher Realien welche zu den Sonn- u. Fest-Tags-Evangelien durchs ganze Jahr zugebrauchen	German	Johann Samuel Adami	Dresden: Mieth; Leipzig, 1699 - Th. 13–14, 1709
1699–1703	L' Esprit des cours de l'Europe où l'on voit tout ce qui s'y passe de plus important sur la politique, et en général ce qu'il y de plus rémarquable dans les nouvelles	French	Andreas Stübel (1653–1725)	Initially: La Haye : L'Honoré, then: Amsterdam : L'Auteur, 1699–1710, 1.1699 - 4.1701; 12.1705 - 19.1710[?]. 5.1701 - 11.1704: Nouvelles des cours de l'Europe où l'on voit tout ce qui s'y passe de plus remarquable sur la politique, & l'Interêt des princes
1699–1711	The History of the Works of the Learned. Or, An Impartial Account of Books Lately Printed in all Parts of Europe. With a Particular Relation of the State of Learning in each Country.	English	Samuel Parker 1681–1730, George Ridpath, d. 1726, ed.	Monthly. Vol. I (January, 1699.)-[vol. XIV.] (January, February, March, 1712) = Vol. I. [Numb. 1]-vol. XIV. Numb. 1., eingestellt Jan. -Jun. 1711. London [England] : printed for H[enry]. Rhodes, at the Star near Fleet-Bridge; J[ohn]. Harris, at the Harrow in Little-Britain; T[homas]. Bennet, at the Half-Moon in St. Paul's Church-Yard; A[ndrew]. Bell, at the Cross-Keys in Cornhill; D[aniel]. Midwinter, and T[homas]. Leigh, at the Rose and Crown in St. Paul's Church-Yard, 1699–1712.

== Established 1700–1750 ==
Period	Title	Language	Responsibilities	Publishing history
1700–1769	Extract derer in der ... Woche eingelauffenen Nouvellen	German	Beteiligt: Valentin Ernst Löscher	[Leipzig] 1700, March 20 - 1769,52(Dec.30)[?], known also as Leipziger Zeitungs-Extract. Der titleformula changed. Till 1711, Dec. 26.: Extract derer in der ... Woche eingelauffenen Nouvellen; 1712, Jan. 9 to 1732, Dec. 26: Extract derer in der ... Woche des ... Jahres eingelauffenen Nouvellen, initiatlly with yearly title: Extract derer Nouvellen, appeared in weekly issues. The cvolumes of each year initially received a new titlepage and an index. Sold as supplement of the: Leipziger Post- und Ordinar-Zeitung, the Leipziger Post-Zeitungen, the Leipziger Zeitungen and the Leipziger Extraordinar-Zeitung
1700–1702	Histoire de l'Académie Royale des Sciences : avec les mémoires de mathématique et de physique pour la même année; tirés des registres de cette Académie; Elektronische Ressource	French	Académie des Sciences	Paris [u.a.] : DuPont, 1700(1761) - 1786(1788)
1700–1702	Monathlicher Auszug aus allerhand neu-herausgegebenen nützlichen und artigen Büchern	German	Johann Georg von Eckhart, secretary of Gottfried Wilhelm Leibniz	Hannover: Förster 1700–1702; discontinued after that number
1700–1705	Observationvm Selectarvm Ad Rem Literariam Spectantivm Tomvs ...	Latin	Christian Thomasius, Georg Ernst Stahl, Nicolaus Hieronymus Gundling, Burkhard Gotthelf Struve, Jacob Friedrich Reimmann and others.	Halæ Magdeburgicæ ... Prostat in Officina Libraria Rengeriana, 1700
1701–1701	Curieuser politischer, historischer, geographischer, heraldischer und genealogischer Discurse uber die wöchentlich einlauffenden Nouvellen oder Neue Historie, ... Monat : welche also eingerichtet daß so wohl Gelehrte als Ungelehrte ihre Vergnügung darinne finden ... / verfertiget von Christian Weidlingen	German	Christian Weidling	Leipzig : Heydler Nr. 1.1701 - 6.1701[?], continuation: Neue Continuation curieuser politischer, historischer, geographischer, heraldischer und genealogischer Discurse über die wöchentlich einlauffenden Nouvellen (1702)
1701–1705	Geheime Brieffe, so zwischen curieusen Personen über notable Sachen der Staats- und gelehrten Welt gewechselt worden	German		Freystadt [i.e. Leipzig] : Hülssen, 1.1701 - 3.1703/04(1705)[?]
1701–1705	Mémoires pour l'histoire des sciences et des beaux arts / recueuillis par l'ordre de S.A.S. Mr. le Duc du Maine	French		Amsterdam : Lorme, 1.1701 - 9.1705[?]. Auszug: L' esprit des journalistes de Trévoux
1701–1705	Memoirs for the curious: Or, An account of what occurs that's rare, secret, extraordinary, prodigious or miraculous, through the world; whether in nature, art, learning, policy or religion. To be continued monthly, by means of a settled correspondence, with most known parts of the Earth.	English		Vol. I. For the year 1701. Numb. I. London, 2 vols.
1701–1715	Nova literaria Helvetica / Collecta a Johanne Jacobo Scheuchzero		Johann Jacob Scheuchzer	Tiguri, 1701(1702) - 1704(1705); 1705/06 - 1713/14(1715)
1701–1702	The Post Angel: Or, Universal Entertainment. Volumes 1-4	English		Vol. 1, January 1701 - June 1701; Vol. 2, November 1701 - December 1701; Vol. 3, January 1702 - June 1702; Vol. 4, July - August 1702
1701–1704	Tweemaandelijke uittreksels / door W. Séwel	Dutch	Willem Sewel	Rotterdam : Bos, 1701–1704, continuation of the: De Boekzaal van Europe (1692–1701), continued under the titles De Boekzaal der geleerde werelt (1705–1708) and Maandelyksche uittreksels of boekzaal der geleerde waereld (1715–1802)
1701–1719	Unschuldige Nachrichten von alten und neuen theologischen Sachen, Büchern, Uhrkunden, Controversien, Veränderungen, Anmerckungen, Vorschläge u.d.g. : auff d. Jahr ...	German	Valentin Ernst Löscher, Gottlob Zeibig, Johann Caspar Löscher, Hector Adrian Janson, David Scharf (1690–1739), Christoph Andreas Lossius, Zahn, Johann Matthaeus [?], Martin Grünwald (1664–1716) [?], Justus Christian Uthen, Johann Gottfried Rochau (1682–1756) [?]	Leipzig : Braun, 1701–1719, 1701: Wittenberg : Ludwig. Forts.: Fortgesetzte Sammlung von alten und neuen theologischen Sachen
1702–1702	A Pacquet from Parnassus: Or, a Collection of Papers	English		
1702–1702	Der curieuse und politische Staats-Mercurius	German		[Halle], 1.1702 - 30.1707[?]
1702–1735	Die europäische Fama, welche den gegenwärtigen Zustand der vornehmsten Höfe entdecket	German	Philipp Balthasar Sinold von Schütz (1657–1742), Christian Stieff (1675–1751)	Leipzig: Gleditsch, Nr. 1.1702 - 360.1735, Fortsetzung: Die neue europäische Fama, welche den gegenwärtigen Zustand der vornehmsten Höfe entdecket
1702–1702	Neue Continuation curieuser politischer, historischer, geographischer, heraldischer und genealogischer Discurse über die wöchentlich einlauffenden Nouvellen	German		Leipzig No. 1.1702 - 6.1702(1703). Coninuation of the Curieuser politischer, historischer, geographischer, heraldischer und genealogischer Discurse uber die wöchentlich einlauffenden Nouvellen oder Neue Historie (1701).
1702–1704	Volumen ... Deliciarum Juridicarum, Derer Uber das erleuterte Jus Civile, Publicum, Naturale Et Gentium, D. i. Römisch-Bürgerliche, Teutsche Reichs- Staats- auch Natürlich und Völcker-Recht ... zwölff Præsenten ...	English		Leipzig: Hülße, 1702, Praesent 1 to Praesent 5 1704
1703–1720	Acta litteraria ex manuscriptis eruta atque collecta	Latin	Burkhard Gotthelf Struve	Jenae. vol. 1.1703/13 = Fasc. 1-10; 2.1717/20 = Fasc. 1-8[?]; 1.1703/13 appeared also in book format under Burkhard G. Struve's authorship: Collectanea manuscriptorum
1703–1705	Deliciarum Manipulus, das ist: Annehmliche und rare Discurse von mancherley nützlichen und curiosen Dingen	German		Dreßden u. Leipzig : Miethe, 1703–1704, 2 parts.
1703–1705	Deliciae medicae et chirurgicae, oder curieuse Anmerckungen, darinnen sich diejenigen, welche Medicin und Chirurgie lieben, nützlich ergötzen können : nebst einem Anhange Chymischer Ergötzligkeiten in unterschiedlichen raren Processen	German		Leipzig : Hülse 1703–1705; 1.-10. Präsent.
1703–1703	Menses Reservati, Oder Monathliche Ubung Bey Neben Stunden Zur Erbauung und Gemüths-Ergötzung / Entworffen Von einigen Unter den Stillen in Lande	German		Leipzig : Fritsch, 1703, Offerte 1 – Offerte 1, 1703 (?)
1703–1709	Nova literaria Germaniae, collecta Hamburgi	Latin	Peter Ambrosius Lehmann, Godofredus Strasbur	Initially: Hamburgi : Schiller, then Hamburgi : Gennagel, 1703–1706, from 1707 onwards as Nova literaria Germaniae, aliorumque Europae regnorum, collecta Hamburgi 5.1707 - 7.1709[?].
1703–1711	The Edinburgh Gazette	English		No. 58 (Thursday 11 May 1710); No. 252 (Thursday 11 October 1711); No. 27 (Tuesday 14 July 1707); No. 429 (Monday 3 May 1703)
1703–1714	Vitae Clarissimorvm in re literaria Virorum: Das ist: Lebens-Beschreibung etlicher Hauptgelehrten Männer so von der Literatur profess gemacht; Worinnen Viel sonderbahre und notable Sachen/ so wohl von ihren Leben/ als geführten Studiis entdecket; Allen curieusen Gemüthern zu sonderbahren Nutzen und Vergnügen entworffen / Von Adolpho Clarmundo	German	Initiator Johann Christoph Rüdiger, Beiträger: Engelbrecht von der Burg (1646–1719), Christian Gottlieb Ludwig	Wittenberg/ Verlegts Christian Gottlieb Ludwig, 1703, Printer: Christian Gottlieb Ludwig, 11 parts until 1714, all reissued before 1722
1704–1713	A Review of the Affairs of France Vol. II	English	Daniel Defoe	three issues per week
1704–1713	Auserlesene Anmerckungen uber allerhand wichtige Materien und Schrifften	German	Christian Thomasius, Nicolaus Hieronymus Gundling, Hoffmann, Jacob Friedrich Reimmann	Franckfurt; Leipzig : Renger 1.1704 - 5.1708
1704–1706	Curieuse Bibliothec, oder, Fortsetzung der Monatlichen Unterredungen einige guten Freunde : von allerhand Büchern und andern annehmlichen Geschichten	German	Wilhelm Ernst Tentzel (1659–1707)	Franckfurt; Leipzig : Stock, [1704–1706], continuation of the Monatlichen Unterredungen einiger guten Freunde (1689–1698)
1704–1709	Der neubestellte Agent von Haus aus, mit allerhand curieusen Missiven, Brieffen, Memoralien, Staffeten, Correspondencen und Commissionen, nach Erforderung der heutigen Staats- und gelehrten Welt	German	Andreas Stübel	Freyburg [i.e. Leipzig] : Wahrmund, 1704–1709, Fonction 1.1704/05 - 3.1708/09. Continuation of the Aufgefangene Brieffe, welche zwischen etzlichen curieusen Personen über den ietzigen Zustand der Staats- und gelehrten Welt gewechselt worden 1699–1703, continued under the title: Der mit allerhand Staats- Friedens- Kriegs- Hof- Literatur- und Religions- wie auch Privat-Affairen beschäfftigte Secretarius und dessen der heutigen curiösen Welt zur galanten Wissenschafft ertheilete ... Expedition (1710–1719).
1704–1704	Gott-Freundes deliciae catecheticae oder Catechismus-Ergetzlichkeiten	German	Georg Heinrich Goetze	Dreßden & Leipzig : Mieth, 1704, not continued
1704–1773	La clef du cabinet des princes de l'Europe ou recueil historique et politique sur les matières du temps : contenant aussi quelques nouvelles de littérature & autres remarques curieuses	French		Luxembourg [u.a.] : Chevalier, 1.1704 - 113.1760; [114.]1761 - [118.]1763; 119.1763 - 138.1773, July. Continuation: Journal historique et littéraire (1773–1794)
1704–1704	Quaestiones sabbathinae, oder curiöse juristische Fragen, auff rare casus eingerichtet; nebst derer genauen Untersuchung und deutlicher Beantwortung / hrsg. von T.	German		Leipzig : Hülße, 1. Theil 1704 - 10. Theil 1705
1705–1705	A Legacy for the Ladies. Or, Characters of the Women of the Age	English		
1705–1707	Bibliandri Deliciæ Ebræo-Homileticæ, Das ist: Ergetzligkeiten der Ebräischen Sprache : Auff der Cantzel zu gebrauchen, Worinnen der Ebräischen Wörter eigentliche und allgemeine Bedeutung, nebst Beyfügung, der neuen Hypotheseōs, Herrn Caspar Neumanns Auffgesuchet ..., Daß auch diejenigen, so nicht studiret haben, zur Erkänntnüß der Ebr. Sprache gelangen, absonderlich aber angehende Prediger und Studiosi Theologiæ, sich dieses Werckes, statt eines Lexici Ebræo-Homiletici, bedienen können. Und des Autoris Vorbericht, von dem gantzen Werck / Mit nützlichen Registern versehen, samt einer Vorrede Hn. D. Johann David Schwerdtners, Superintend. zu Pirna	German	David Heermann (1655–1720), Johann David Schwertner (1658–1711, Caspar Neumann (1648–1715)	Dreßden und Leipzig, Verlegts Johann Christoph Mieth, 1705–1707
1705–1707	Bibliotheca antiqua publicata Jenae Anno 1705	Latin	Burkhard Gotthelf Struve	[Jena]: Bielckius, January 1705 till March 1707, continued as the Thesaurus variae eruditionis ex scriptoribus potissimum seculi XVI et XVII / collectus, curante Burcardo Gotth. Struvio
1705–1708	De Boekzaal der geleerde werelt	Dutch		Amsterdam, 1705–1708, continuation of the De Boekzaal van Europe (1692–1701) und Tweemaandelijke uittreksels (1701–1704), continued as: Maandelyksche uittreksels of boekzaal der geleerde waereld (1715–1802)
1705–1712	Des entzückten Marforio in die Welt gethane Reisen. [Probe 3, 4, 6, 7, 10: Des entzückten Marforio in die Welt gethaner Reisen. Probe 5, 8: Des entzückten Marforio in die Welt gethaner Traum-Reisen.]. Von Friedlieb Kriegfeinden	German	Friedlieb Kriegfeind	Klagenfurth, 1705. Proben 1.1705 - 12.1711.
1705–1706	Menses pietistici : die Tieffe des Sathans Sathans in dem Hermetisch-Zoroastrisch-Pythagorisch-Platonisch-Cabalistischen Christenthum der Pietisten insonderheit eines Stargardischen Theologastri aus deßen Einleitung zur gründl. Kirchen-Historie, Ihn zur Beßerung andern zur Warnung vorstellend; erster Monath in welchen die Tieffe des Sathans in den heydnischen Christenthum der Pietisten gezeiget wird	German	Christian Friedrich Bücher (1651–1714)	1st month 1705 – 12th month 1706.
1706–1707	D. Nicol. Hieronymi Gundlings P.P. Otia	German	Nicolaus Hieronymus Gundling (1671–1729)	Franckf. und Leipzig/ Zufinden in der Rengerischen Buchhandlung, 1706–1707.
1706–1709	Der Hinten und forn wohlgepuckelter Hinckende Staats-Bote : ein Frantzmann Hält ein Gespräch mit seinem Cousin, Mons. de la Kohlenbrenner	German		[S.l.], 1. – 86. Reise, 1707–1709
1706–1711	Der Welt Urtheile von den gegenwärtigen Staats-, Kriegs-, gelehrten und gemeinen Sachen schertz- und ernsthafft ausgeführet	German		Leipzig [u.a.]: 1.1706 - 20.1711
1707–1738	Bibliothèque choisie, pour servir de suite a la Bibliothèque Universelle	French	Jean Le Clerc	Amsterdam : Henri Schelte (1707–1738), continuation of the Bibliothèque universelle et historique (1686–1718), continued by the Bibliothèque ancienne et moderne : pour servir de suite aux Bibliothèques universelle et choisie (1714–1730)
1707–1710	Einleitung zur heutigen Historie aus denen täglich einlauffenden Zeitungen	German	"Herr Professor Ludewig"	Leipzig : Fritsch, 1.1707 - 30.1710
1707–1709	Fama Academica Intimans Disputationes In Academiis Germanicis Ac Quibusdam Exteris Habitas	German	"Herr Professor Ludewig"	Lipsiae : Theophil Georgi, according to some library catalogues: Burgkmann, Tuba prima 1707, decima quarta 1709; continuation: Die gelehrte Fama (1711–1718)
1707–1714	Joachim Langens/ Pastoris und des Fried. Gymnasii in Berlin Directoris, Auffrichtige Nachricht Von der Unrichtigkeit Der so genanten Unschuldigen Nachrichten/ Zur waren Unterscheidung Der Orthodoxie und Pseudorthodoxie : aus unpartheyischer Prüfung Nach der Warheit und Liebe mitgetheilet	German	Joachim Lange	Varying titles and different information about publishers involved: "Leipzig; Halle, S. Zeitler, 1707–1714", but also "Leipzig/ Verlegts Johann Heinichens Wittwe, 1707–1714" and "1701–1709: Leipzig : Heinichen".
1707–1710	M. Joh. Samuels Adami, sonst Misanders, Deliciae Passionales Oder Paßions-Ergetzlichkeiten : Worinnen der Griechische Text wohl untersuchet ... und Nach Ordnung Der Vier Evangelisten eingerichtet worden	German	Johann Samuel Adami	Hamburg: Heyl u. Liebezeit, 1707, 5th part, 1710
1707–1708	The Muses Mercury; Or, the Monthly Miscellany	English		Volume 1, No. 1, 3, 6 (1707); Volume 2, No. 1 (1708)
1708–1711	Ausführlicher Bericht von allerhand neuen Büchern und andern Dingen so zur heutigen Historie der Gelehrsamkeit gehörig	German	Christoph Woltereck, Johann Gottlieb Krause, Justus Gotthard Rabener	Frankfurt; Leipzig : Stock 1.1708 – 13.1711
1708–1710	Bibliothèque critique ou recüeil de diverses pieces critiques dont la plûpart ne sont point imprimées ou ne se trouvent que très difficilement / publ. par Mr. de Sainjore	French	Richard Simon	Amsterdam [et al.] : De Lormes, 1.1708 - 4.1710[?]; continuation: Nouvelle bibliothèque choisie (1714)
1708–1708	Censura Temporum. The Good or Ill Tendencies of Books, Sermons, Pamphlets &c. Impartially Considered in a Dialogue Between Eubulus and Sophronius.	English	Samuel Parker	
1708–1708	Discurs Curiöser Sachen, Insonderheit Hermetischer, Philosophischer, Physicalischer, Medicinischer und anderer Wissenschafften / Im Monath Januario, 1708. Heraus gegeben Von Joh. Godofr. Meerheim, Eq. Au. Cr.	German	Johannes Godofredus Meerheim	Leipzig : Johann Jakob Fritsch, 1708, appeared only with the numbers for January, February March and April
1708–1708	Ephemeris s. patrum	Latin	"Der Verfertiger ist der Herr Koch in Flensburg"	Flensburgi: Joh. Christ. Schumann, 1708
1708–1710	Geheime Brief-Tasche : Darinnen verschiedene Zwischen Ihme und einigen Thieren Gewechselte Denckwürdige Schreiben Von dem Zustande der Welt zu befinden	German		Astura [i.e. Leipzig], 1st and 2nd "Eröffnung" 1708, continued till 1710 eventually under the title Pasquini Zu dreyenmahlen geöffnete Geheime Brief-Tasche : darinnen verschiedene Zwischen Ihme und einigen Thieren, Als dem Löwen, Reit-Pferd ... Gewechselte denckwürdige Schreiben von Dem Zustande der Welt zu befinden
1708–1723	Lebens-Beschreibungen Der Biblischen Scribenten	German	Georg Serpilius (1668–1723)	Leipzig : Seidel, 1708–1725
1708–1710	Richtige Harmonia Oder Ubereinstimmung Hundert solcher Sprüche und Oerter, welche in H. Schrifft vorkommen, und einander scheinen zuwider zu lauffen ... / außgefertiget von Bibliandern	German	David Heermann	1708–1710
1708–1711	The British Apollo, or, Curious amusements for the ingenious	English		London, Febr. 13., 1708 till Mai, 11 1711.
1709–1716[?]	Electa iuris publici worinnen die vornehmsten Staatsaffairen in Europa, besonders in Teutschland, aus bewährtesten Actis publicis, mit Beyfügung der Schreiben, Memoralien, Conclusorum, Informationen, Responsorum, Kriegs- und Friedens-Sachen ... recensiret werden, sammt einigen Anm.	German	Georg Melchuro von Ludolf und Johann Joachim Müller	[Jena]: Officina Publica, first volume 1709.
1709–1710	Neue Bibliothec oder Nachricht und Urtheile von neuen Büchern und allerhand zur Gelehrsamkeit dienenden Sachen	German	Initiated by Gvilielmo Turckius, Nos. 12–40 continued by Nicolaus Hieronymus Gundling, until 1716 by Magister Peter Adolf Boysen	Franckfurt; Leipzig : Renger St. 1.1709 – 100.1721; discontinued after that number
1709–1716	Neu-eröffneter Welt- und Staatsspiegel : worinnen die in Europa, wie auch denen andern Theilen der Welt, vornehmlich aber in Teutschland vorfallende merckwürdigen Begebenheiten kürtzlich vorgestellet ... wird	German	Johann Ehrenfried Zschackwitz	Haag, 1.1709 - 100.1716; discontinued after that number, continuation of the Monatlicher Staats-Spiegel (1698–1709)
1709–1716	Nova Librorvm Rariorvm Conlectio, Qvi Vel Integri Inservntvr Vel Adcvrate Recensentvr	Latin	Heinrich August Groschuff Hrsg.: Gottfried Tilgner	Halis Magdeburg.: Johann Gottfried Renger, 1709–1716, Fortsetzung: Nova Variorum Scriptorum Conlectio, Tam Editorum Quam Ineditorum Rariorum Etiam, Et Recens Elaboratorum, Quae Omnia Integra Dantur. 1716–1717
1709–1710	The Female Tatler. By Mrs. Crackenthorpe, a Lady that Knows Every Thing	English		
1709–1711	The Ladies Diary: Or, the Womens Almanack	English		
1709–1711	The Tatler	English	Joseph Addison, Richard Steele	Appeared in three issues per week, No. 1 (12 April 1709) - No. 330 (19 May 1711)
1710–1718	Deliciæ Græco-Homileticæ, Das ist: Biblische Ergötzlichkeiten der Griechischen Sprache : auff der Cantzel zugebrauchen, Worinnen der Griechischen Wörter eigentliche und allgemeine Bedeutung auffgesuchet/ derer Nachdruck gewiesen/ und aus denen berühmtesten Autoribus Wie auch aus eigenen Anmerkungen zusammen getragen/ und Nebst einer kurtzen Vorrede ausgefertiget / von M. Georgio Laurentio, Past. in Wölckau	German	Georg Laurentius	Dreßden; Leipzig : Mieth, 1710–1718
1710–1719	Der mit allerhand Staats- Friedens- Kriegs- Hof- Literatur- und Religions- wie auch Privat-Affairen beschäfftigte Secretarius und dessen der heutigen curiösen Welt zur galanten Wissenschafft ertheilete ... Expedition.	German		Freyburg: Gronovius 1.1710 – 48.1719, continuation of the Agenten von 1704–1709 and the Aufgefangene Brieffe, welche zwischen etzlichen curieusen Personen über den ietzigen Zustand der Staats- und gelehrten Welt gewechselt worden 1699–1703.
1710–1715	Der Thaler-Collection Erste Abtheilung, Enthaltend In Sechs Scatolen Auf 36. Tabellen Hundert und Acht Stück allerhand Species Reichs-Thaler : Nebst Derselben deutlichen Erklärung	German	Peter Ambrosius Lehmann (1663–1729)	Hamburg, bey Christian Liebezeit, 1710, appeared in 6 "Scatolen".
1710–1740	Giornale de'letterati d'Italia	Italian		Venezia, 1.1710 - 40.1740, 1733–1738. Continuation: Nuovo giornale de'letterati d'Italia (1773–1790)
1710–1715	Historischer Schauplatz Vornehmer und berühmter Staats- und Rechts-Gelehrten/ : Darinnen Viele denckwürdige und sonderbahre Sachen von ihrem geführten Leben und Verrichtungen/ heraus gegebenen Schrifften/ Glücks- und Unglücks-Fällen/ und andern nachdencklichen Begebenheiten vorgestellet werden ...	German	Library catalogues note as possible authors Peter Dahlmann and Rühlmann	Franckfurt und Leipzig/ Verlegst Joh. Michael Rüdiger, 1710–1715
1710–1715	Memoirs of literature : containing a weekly account of the state of learning, both at home and abroad	English	Michel de La Roche	London 1710–1715. Continuation: New memoirs of literature: Containing an Account of new books printed both at Home and Abroad, with dissertations, etc. London, 1725-27.
1710–1711	Memoirs of Literature	English		
1710–1717	Neuer Bücher-Saal der gelehrten Welt oder Ausführliche Nachrichten von allerhand neuen Büchern und andern Sachen, so zur neuesten Historie der Gelehrsamkeit gehören	German	Author till 25th "Öffnung" (third year) Johann Gottlieb Krause, till 33rd: Johann Georg Walch (1693–1775), continued after that by several authors in a joint venture.	Leipzig: Gleditsch, 1.1710/11 - 5.1715/17 = Öffnung 1-60[?]
1710–1710	Neuer Vorrath allerhand außerlesener Bücher und anderer Sachen, so zur Kirchen- u. Literar-Historie gehörig	German		Frankfurt [u.a.] : Rußworm, 1710
1710–1710	Republyk der geleerden, of kort begryp van Europas letternieuws voor den kunst en letterminnaren	Dutch		Amsterdam, 1.1710 - 128.1774[?], Titel teils auch: Republyk der geleerden of Boezaal van Europa
1710–1711	The Visions of Sir Heister Ryley: With Other Entertainments	English		
1710–1714	The Examiner	English		Vol. 1, No. 1-52 (Thursday 3 August 1710 ? Thursday 26 July 1711); Vol. 2, No. 1-47 (Thursday 6 December 1711 ? Thursday 23 October 1712); Vol. 3, No. 1-50 (Thursday 30 October 1712 ? Friday 16 May 1713); Vol. 4, No. 1-50 (Monday 18 May 1713 ? Friday 27 November 1713); Vol. 5, No. 1-50 (Monday 30 November 1713 ? Friday 21 May 1714); Vol. 6, No. 1-19 (Monday 24 May 1714 ? Monday 26 July 1714)
1710–1711	The Tory Tatler	English		No. 1 (27 November 1710) - No. 16 (3 January 1711)
1710–1711	The Visions of Sir Heister Ryley: With Other Entertainments	English		No. 3 (Friday 25 August 1710) - No. 80 (Wednesday 21 February 1711
1711–1722	Curieuses Bücher-Cabinet	German	Antonio Paullini (Johann Jacob Schmauß), Magister Wagner in Halle	Eingang 1.1711-56.1720
1711–1714	Das Neueste von historisch- und politischen Sachen, bestehend in unterschiedenen Urtheilen über die jetzigen Staats-, Kriegs- und andere Affairen, schertz- und ernsthafft ausgeführet			Frankfurt, M., 1.1711 - 24.1714[?]
1711–1711	Deliciae Epostolicae			Three parts until 1711, the fourth was still expected to appear in 1716.
1711–1718	Die Gelehrte Fama, welche den gegenwärtigen Zustand der gelehrten Welt und sonderlich derer deutschen Universitäten entdecket	German	Karl Friedrich Pezold "Magister Klos and Herr Licent. Usleber"	Leipzig : Georgi, Nr. 1.1711 - 67/68.[1718?], continuation of the Fama Academica (1707–1709).
1711–1712; 1726–1726	Le Misanthrope : pour l'année ...	French	Justus van Effen	La Haye : Johnson, 1.1711 - 2.1712; new series: 1.1726 - 2.1726
1711–1712	Schwedische Fama welche den Zustand Ihro Königl. Majestät Caroli XII. auß glaubwürdiger Nachricht kund machet	German	Johann Ehrenfried Zschackwitz	[Jena]; Tl. 1-12
1711–1715	Theophili Amelii ... Erörterung Der dunckelsten und schwersten Schrifft-Stellen im N. Testament, In welcher 1. Nach gründlicher Untersuchung der H. Grund-Sprache, 2. Genaue Aufmercksamkeit auf die Verknüpffung der Heil. Schrifft, 3. Bescheidentliche Verbesserung der Ubersetzung Lutheri, 4. Fleißiges Nachlesen ... Viele bißhero unbekan̄te Göttliche Wahrheiten ... entworffen und geöffnet werden	German	Peter Zorn	Köln: Pierre Marteau, 1711–1715, 1725–1728.
1711–1712, 1714	The Spectator	English	Joseph Addison, Richard Steele	Appeared in three issues per week
1710–1710	Vernünfftige Urtheile von Gelehrten Leuten, und sowohl Alten als Neuen Büchern : Ingleichen von verschiedenen Anmerckungen In Historia Litteraria, Ecclesiastica, Profana, ... Welchen beygefüget Excerpta aus Isaaci Casauboni und Gabriel. Naudæi Epistolis, und etliche rare Bücher	German	Johann Christoph Rüdiger	Franckfurt, In Verlag Rudolph Danckwehrts, 1710, 6 Teile
1712–1722	Academiae Caesareo-Leopoldinae Natvrae Cvriosorvm ephemerides : sive observationvm medico-physicarvm a celeberrimis viris tum medicis, tum aliis eruditis in Germania et extra eam communicatarum centvria	Latin	Corporate body: Sacri Romani Imperii Academia Caesareo-Leopoldina Naturae Curiosorum	Augustae Vindelicorum : Kühtz, 1712–1722, Initially: Francofurti; Lipsiae; Norimbergae : Riegel. Continuation of the Miscellanea Curiosa Medico-Physica Academiae Naturae Curiosorum (1670–1706).
1712–1717	Christiani Rungii, Gymn. Magd. Vrat. Coll. Miscellanea Literaria, De Qvibusdam ineditis Historiæ Silesiacæ Scriptoribus ac Operibus	Latin	Christian Identity Runge	Olsnæ : Straubelius, i.e. Johann Gottlieb Straubel, Specimen I, 1712 – Specimen IV, 1717
1712–1722	Observationes miscellaneae, oder vermischte Gedancken über allerhand theologische, politische, historische, auch andere zur Antiquität und Ausführung der Historie der Gelehrsamkeit dienende curieuse Materien nebst unterschiedenen nöthigen Zusätzen	German	Johann Christoph Koch	Leipzig : Groß, T. 1.1712/13(1713) - 3.1715/17(1717) = Theil 1-36[?]
1712, 1723	The Flying Post; Or, The Post-Master	English		
1712–1712	A New Almanack for the Year from the Nativity of our Lord and Saviour Jesus Christ, 1712. By George Rose, Mathematician	English		
1712–1712	A New Almanack for the Year of Our Lord God, 1712	English		
1712–1712	A Prognostication for the Year of our Lord God 1712. By John Wing, Math	English		
1712–1712	A Prognostication for this Present Year of Our Lord God, 1712. By John	English		
1712–1712	Culpepper Revived. Being an Almanack for the Year of our Blessed Saviour's Incarnation 1712. By Nathaniel Culpepper	English		
1712–1712	Geheimes Cabinet, darinnen allerhand Staats- & Liebesintriguen ... vornehmer Minister ... vorgestellt werden / von Philistorion	German	Philistorion (pseud.)	Leipzig: Lanckisch, 1.1712 - 8.1713
1712–1712	Speculum Uranicum: Or, an Almanack and Prognostications for the Year of our Lord God 1712	English		
1712–1712	The Plain Dealer	English		
1712–1713	The Guardian	English		Appeared in three issues per week
1712–1739	Deutsche Acta Eruditorum	German	Initiated by Johann Burckhardt Mencke, main author from 1712 to 1719: Justus Gotthard Rabener	Leipzig: Gleditsch 1.1712 - 20.1739 = Nos. 1-240
1712–1739	Der Vernünftler. Teutscher Auszug aus den Engelländischen Moral-Schriften Des Tatler und Spectator	German	Johann Mattheson	
1712–1718	Histoire critique de la république des lettres, tant ancienne que moderne	French	Samuel Masson (1689–1739)	Amsterdam : Desbordes, 1712–1718, Utrecht : Poolsum, 1712–1718
1713–1713	Deliciae poenitentiales od. Buss-Ergetzlichkeiten : bestehende in 103 Sprüchen Heiliger göttlicher Schrifft ...	German	Johann Samuel Adami	Hamburg: Samuel Heyl, 1713, planned as a journal without becoming one.
1713–1713	Der Benderisch-Türckischen Fama, Vollständige, Unpartheyische und Historische Relation, Was Se. Königl. Majest. von Schweden seit Dero Auffenthalt in Bender vor eine Art des Landes, Humeur der Inwohner, Anordnungen im Gottesdienst, und Staat am Hofe zu Constantinopel in der Türkei gefunden	German		Hamburg: Samuel Heyl, 1713, appeared in four "Communications", and heavily criticised by Curieusen Nachrichten (1716).
1713–1713	Deutliche Erklärung der heiligen Schrift aus der emphasi oder Macht der Grund-Sprache : Vorstellung ...	German	Johann Wilhelm Zierold	Leipzig : Braun, 1.1713, 6.1714, 12.1715, 14.1716, 17.1717.
1713–1715	Die in vorigen und itzigen Seculo sich ereigenden Staats-Paradoxa und begangenen Staats-Fehler mit Historischer Feder untersuchet	German	Johann Ehrenfried Zschackwitz (1669–1744)	Freystadt, 1.1713 - 3.1715[?]
1713–1715, 1718–1720	Pax, Pax, Pax, Or a Pacifick Post Boy	English		No. 2807 (Thurs 7 May 1713) - No. 2813 (Thurs 21 May 1713); No. 2819 (Tues 4 June 1713) - 1820 (Sat 6 June 1713); No. 2822 (Thurs 11 June 1713) - 2823 (Saturday 13 June 1713); No. 2959 (Tues 27 April 1714); No. 2978 (Thurs 10 June 1714); No. 3012 (Saturday 28 August 1714); No. 4067 (Thurs 25 August 1715); No. 4483 (Tues 22 April 1718); No. 4489 (Tues 6 May 1718); No. 4754 (Thurs 14 January 1719); 4758 (Sat 23 January 1719) - 4759 (Tues 26 January 1719); 4882 (Tues 8 November 1720) - 4883 (Thurs 10 November 1720)
1713–1716	Der unpartheyische Bibliothecarius welcher die Urtheile derer Gelehrten von Gelehrten und ihren Schrifften auffrichtig entdecket	German	J. H. Kloß	Leipzig : Kloßen, 1.1713 - 13.1714(?), continued with the same publisher by Johann Gottlieb Krause under the title Umständliche Bücher-Historie, Oder Nachrichten und Urtheile von allerhand alten und neuen Schriftstellern
1713–1737	Journal litéraire	French	J. H. Kloß	La Haye, 1.1713 - 24.1737; discontinued after that number
1713–1716	Neu-eröffnetes Museum oder allerhand dienliche Anmerckungen [Aus der Theologia Casuali, Morali und Curiosa, Kirchen-Historie etc., Historia Civili, Jure Publico, Oratorie, Poësie und andern zur Gelehrsamkeit dienenden Sachen etc.] nebst unpassionirter Reflexion über unterschiedene Programmata berühmter Rectorum	German		Leipzig : (Jo. Heinichen), 1714–1719
1713–1713	The British Merchant; Or, Commerce Preserv'd: In Answer to the Mercator, or Commerce Retriev'd	English		
1713–1714	Schlüßel zur heutigen Historie, wodurch von allen merckwürdigen Staats-Kriegs- und Friedens-Begebenheiten europäischer Höffe exacte Relation ertheilt wird	German	Johann Ehrenfried Zschackwitz (1669–1744)	Without further information about the printer. 1st quartal 1-4, 1713; 2nd quartal 1-4, 1714; 1715, continued as Jetziger Zustand Europae, wodurch die vornehmsten zur heutigen Historie dienliche Memoiren ertheilet werden
1713–1713	The Lay Monk	English		
1713–1714	The Lay-Monastery Consisting of Essays, Discourse, &tc. Published Singly under the Title of the Lay-Monk. Being the Sequel of the Spectators. The Second Edition.	English		No. 1-40 (Monday November 16, 1713 – Monday February 15, 1714)
1713–1732	Vergnügung müßiger Stunden oder allerhand nützliche zur heutigen galanten Gelehrsamkeit dienende Anmerckungen	German	Thomas Theodor Crusius	Leipzig : Rohrbach, pt. 1.1713 - 20.1732
1713–1714	Vitae Et Scripta Magnorvm Jvris Consvltorvm : Dass ist: vollständige Leben und Schrifften Grosser Juristen; Aus gewissen Nachrichten nach ihren vornehmsten Denckwürdigkeiten und notablesten Sachen auffrichtig beschrieben / Von Clavdio Sincero	German	Peter Dahlmann	Wittenberg, Bey Christian Gottlieb Ludwigen, Erster Tomvs, 1713, 2nd volume, 1714.
1714–1717	Aufrichtige und unpartheyische Gedanken über die Journale, Extracte und Monats-Schrifften	German	Jakob Wilhelm Feuerlein, Christian Gottfried Hoffmann.	Freiburg [u.a.], 1 Stück, 1714, 24. Stück 1717, Index 1/12 in: 12.1715; Index 13/24 in 24.1717.
1714–1717	Der meditirende, und inventieuse Eclecticus : Welcher Seine Philosophische, und Philologische, wie auch Juristische Remarques, und neue Erfindungen zu fernerem Nachsinnen und Unterricht der gelehrten Welt communiciret	German	Adam Friedrich Glafey (1692–1753)	Jena : Gollner, 1714, pts 1-5 then discontinued.
1714–1714	Der Raisonnierende Juriste, welcher seine raisonnements aus denen Regeln der Klugheit und dem vernünfftigen Rechte, wie auch denen römischen und teutschen Antiquitäten über die Stücke der Rechtsgelehrsamkeit ergehen lässet	German	Adam Friedrich Glafey (1692–1753)	Jena: Nr. 1.1714 - 3.1714
1714–1730	Bibliothèque ancienne et moderne : pour servir de suite aux Bibliothèques universelle et choisie / par Jean Le Clerc	French	Jean Le Clerc	La Haye : Husson, 1714–1730, also: Amsterdam : Mortier, 1.1714 - 28.1727; 29.1730. continuation of the Bibliothèque universelle et historique (1686–1693/ 1713/ 1718) and the Bibliothèque choisie, pour servir de suite a la Bibliothèque Universelle (1707–1738)
1714–1717	Entdecktes Staats-Cabinet : darinnen so wohl das jus publicum, feudale u. ecclesiasticum, nebst d. Ceremoniel- u. Curialien-Wesen, als auch d. Kirchen- u. polit. Historie, samt d. Genealogie u. Literatur ... mit beygefügten Diplomatibus illustriret wird / von Johann Joachim Müllern	German	Johann Volkmar Müller; Johann Joachim Müller	Jena : Pohl, "Eröffnung" 1.1714 - 8.1717; 1738 reissued as: Continuation of the Hochfürstl.-Sachsen-Weimarischen Raths und gemeinschafftlichen Archivarii Johann Joachim Müllers Entdeckten Staats-Cabinets (1738)
1714–1717	Erbaulicher Zeit-Vertreib Gott-ergebener Seelen	German	Johann Andreas Roth	Leipzig : Johann Christian Martini, 1714
1714–1724	Nouveau Mercure galant	French		Contuinuation of the Mercure Galant and the Mercure de France (1724–1825)
1714–1724	Monumentorum ineditorum variisque linguis conscriptorum, historiam inprimis, genealogias medii aevi, et rem litterariam illustrantium fasciculi XII, singulis trimestribus hactenus / publicati e Museo Joachimi Friderici Felleri	Latin	Joachim Friedrich Feller (1673–1726)	Jenæ, apud Jo. Felicem Bielckium (Johann Felix Bielcke), 1. Trimester 1714 - 12. Trimester 1718
1714–1714	Nouvelle bibliothèque choisie, où l'on fait connaître les bons livres en divers genres de littérature, & l'usage qu'on en doit faire	French	Nicolas Barat	Amsterdam : Mortier, 1.1714 - 2.1714[?]; continuation of the Bibliothèque critique (1708–1710)
1714–1714	The Controller, Being a Sequel to the Examiner	English		Continuation of The Examiner (1710–1714)
1714–1744	Theophili Alethaei gründliche Erleuterung der dunckelen Oerter und Steine des Anstossens A. u. N. Testaments : nebst e. ausführl. Bericht von denen Commentariis u. Auslegern d. heiligen Schrifft. - Leipzig 1.1714 - 96.1744[?]	German	1716 continued by Magister Laurenz Müller	
1714–1714	The Reader	English		
1714–1714	Vitae virorum ex quavis facultate clarissimorum : Das ist: Lebens-Beschreibungen Etlicher vortrefflich-Gelehrter Männer in mancherley Wissenschafften; Darinnen Unterschiedene Particularia so wohl von ihren Leben, als Schrifften, dem geneigten Leser getreulich communiciret werden / Von Dan. Friedr. Pönmannen	German	Daniel Friedrich Poenmann	Wittenberg : Christian Gottlieb Ludwig, 1714, a continuation was still expected in 1716.
1715–1726	Acta Philosophorum	German	August Heumann	Halle: Renger 1.1715 - 18.1726
1715–1726	Das Neueste aus der gelehrten Welt	German	"Magister Schramm"	Frankfurt, M. : Zunners Erben : Jung, 1715,1-36[?]
1715–1742	Der schnelle Postillon : einholend und mitbringend den Kern und Auszug neuer Zeitungen	German	"Magister Schramm"	Nürnberg : Lochner, 1715–1742, Periodizität: wöchentl.
1715–1726	Germane acta litteraria, oder Geschichte der Gelehrten, worinnen der Zustand der alten und neuen Litteratur enthalten	German	"Magister Schramm"	Leipzig : Fleischer Th. 1.1715 - 3.1715
1715–1715	Die in ihre Beeten ordentlich versetzte Pflantzen, oder Einleitung in das Artificium excerpendi M. J. B. M. durch würckliche Sammlung allerhand merckwürdiger Sachen aus guten Büchern zum nützlichen Gebrauch unter ihre Titul und Stellen, wie solche im besagten Tractat angewiesen werden	German		Leipzig, 1715, appeared only with this first "Pensum".
1715–1715	Freiwilliger Hebopfer von allerhand in die Theologie lauffenden Materien	German		Berlin : Rüdiger, 1.1715 - 48.1715; discontinued after that number
1715–1716	Grapilleur historique oder historischer Nachleser der wöchentlich einlauffenden allerneust- und merckwürdigsten Zeitungen	German		Augspurg : Maschenbauer, 1.1715 – 2.1716
1715–1732	Gundlingiana	German	Nicolaus Hieronymus Gundling	Irregular appearance, 1.1715–45.1732
1715–1730	Historie des Jahrs ... oder zur Kirchen-Politisch- und Gelehrten-Historie dieses Jahrs gehörige Haupt-Anmerckungen	German	Nicolaus Hieronymus Gundling	Coburg : Pfotenhauer, 1716–1731, [1.]1715(1716) - [6.]1720(1721); 7.1721(1722) - 16.1730(1731)[?], appeared in monthly issues, known also as: Coburgischer Zeitungs-Extract, continuation: Kurzgefaßte Geschichte des Jahres (1741)
1715–1716	Jetziger Zustand Europae, wodurch die vornehmsten zur heutigen Historie dienliche Memoiren ertheilet werden	German	Johann Ehrenfried Zschackwitz (1669–1744)	1.1715 - 2.1716[?], appeared previously as Schlüßel zur heutigen Historie, wodurch von allen merckwürdigen Staats-Kriegs- und Friedens-Begebenheiten europäischer Höffe exacte Relation ertheilt wird (1713–1714)
1715–1802	Maandelyksche uittreksels of boekzaal der geleerde waereld	Dutch		Amsterdam : Onder de Linden, 1715–1802, continuation of: De Boekzaal van Europe (1692–1701), Tweemaandelijke uittreksels (1701–1704), De Boekzaal der geleerde werelt (1705–1708), Maandelyksche uittreksels of boekzaal der geleerde waereld (1705–1802)
1715–1734	Neue Acerra Philologica Oder Gründliche Nachrichten Aus der Philologie Und den Römischen und Griechischen Antiquitaeten : Darinnen Die schweresten Stellen aller Autorum Classicorum Der Studirenden Jugend Zum besten In einer angenehmen Erzehlung kürtzlich und gründlich erkläret werden	German	Peter Adolf Boysen	Halle im Magdeb.: Renger, 1715–1734
1715–1732	Neueröffnete Moralisten-Bibliothec, oder die durch Engländische, Frantzösische, Holländische, Deutsche, Italiänische, Griechische und Lateinische Schrifften erläuterte geistliche Morale oder Sitten-Lehre nach allen Tugenden und Lastern : nebst denen dahin sich beziehenden Materien zu einem sonderbaren Hülffs-Mittel für alle, so diese Wissenschaft lieben abgefasset	German	Gottfried Christian Lentner (1690–1724).	Leipzig : Groschuff, 1715–1718
1715–1784	Neue Zeitungen von Gelehrten Sachen : auf das Jahr ...,	German	Johann Burchard Mencke	1715–1717: Leipzig : Gross/ Leipzig : Zeitungs-Expedition, 1715–1784, twice weekly; 1715–1716: the weekly as: Neue Leipziger gelehrte Zeitungen (Leipzig : Breitkopf, 1785–1787). Included as a supplement from 1718 to 1737 the Nova litteraria eruditorum in gratiam divulgata
1715–1720	Nouvelles littéraires contenant ce qui se passe de plus considérable dans la république des lettres	French		La Haye [u.a.], 1.1715 - 12.1720
1715–1715	Observationes sacrae ad varia eaque difficiliora scripturae sacrae loca	Latin	Georg Ludwig Oeder	Francofurti; Lipsiae: 1715
1715–1734	Summarischer Nachrichten Von auserlesenen, mehrentheils alten, in der Thomasischen Bibliothèque vorhandenen Büchern	German	Directed by Christian Thomasius, Simon Friedrich Hahn (1692–1729), Christian August Salig (1691–1738), involved also Thomasius's daughter.	Halle und Leipzig, Verlegts Johann Friderich Zeitler, 1715–1718 : 1st till 24th piece; in two volumes
1715–1717	The Censor. Volume 1-3	English		Volume 1, No. 1-30 (Monday 11 April 1715 – Friday 17 June 1715)
1715–1715	The Daily Benefactor	English		
1715–1716	The Free-Holder	English		1-54 (Friday 23 December 1715 – Monday 25 June 1716)
1715–1716	The Free-Holder: Or, Political Essays by the Right Honourable Joseph Addison, Esq (1761 Reprint)	English		
1715–1715	The Grumbler	English		
1715–1715	The Medley	English		
1715–1717	The St. James's Evening Post	English		No. 85 (Thursday 15 December 1715); No. 118 (Thursday 1 March 1716); No. 288 (Tuesday 12 March 1717)
1715, 1718	The St. James's Post: With the Best Occurrences, Foreign and Domestic	English		No. 125 (Friday 1 November 1715); No. 467 (Friday 17 January 1718)
1715–1716	Town Talk: In A Series of Letters to a Lady in the Country	English		No. 1 (17 December 1715) - No. 9 (13 February 1715 – 1716)
1715–1716	Umständliche Bücher-Historie, Oder Nachrichten und Urtheile von allerhand alten und neuen Schriftstellern : Zu genauerer Untersuchung der Bücher-Wissenschafft aus vielen Auctoribus zusammen getragen und ans Licht gestellt / von Johann Gottlieb Krausen	German	Johann Gottlieb Krause	Continuation of J. H. Kloß Der Unpartheyische Bibliothecarius. Welcher die Urtheile derer Gelehrten von Gelehrten und ihren Schrifften auffrichtig entdecket, Leipzig: Kloß, 1715–1716
1715–1715	Weekly Remarks and Political Reflections Upon the Most Material News Foreign and Domestick	English		Volume 1, No. 1 (Saturday 3 December 1715) - No. 11 (Saturday 11 February 1715); No. 14 (Thursday 1 March 1715)
1715–1720	Wöchentliche Post-Zeitungen von gelehrten Neuigkeiten : auf das Jahr ...	German	Daniel Gottfried Liebe	Leipzig : Königl. u. Churfürstl. Sächs. Zeitungs-Expedition, 1715, May 4 till 1720, Jan. 25th
1716–1716	Acta litteraria antiqua, oder Geschichte der Gelehrten, worinnen der Zustand der alten Litteratur eintzig und allein enthalten	German		Leipzig : Fleischer 4.1716 - 5.1716[?]
1716–1716	Das jetztlebende Schweden auff dem grossen Schauplatz des Nordischen Krieges : nach der allerneuesten und richtigsten Correspondence	German		No information on printer and year, but dated by Curieuse Nachricht (1716) and supposed to be continued then.
1716–1717	Nova Variorum Scriptorum Conlectio, Tam Editorum Quam Ineditorum Rariorum Etiam, Et Recens Elaboratorum, Quae Omnia Integra Dantur	Latin	Johann Philipp Hein (1688–1775)	Halae Magd. : Renger, 1716–1717. Früher u.d.T.: Nova Librorvm Rariorvm Conlectio, Qvi Vel Integri Inservntvr Vel Adcvrate Recensentvr / [Heinrich August Groschuff. Ed.: Gottfried Tilgner]. - Halis Magdeburg. : Renger, 1709–1716
1716–1717, 1720	The Original Weekly Journal. With Fresh Advices, Foreign and Domestick.	English		Saturday 4 August 1716; Saturday 25 August 1716; Saturday 1 September 1716; Saturday 15 September 1716; Saturday 29 December 1716; Saturday 5 January 1717; Saturday 12 January 1717; Saturday 19 January 1717; Saturday 2 February 1717; Saturday 18 May 1717; Saturday 30 April 1720
1716–1720	Mercurius Politicus: Being Monthly Observations on the Affairs of Great Britain. Volumes 1-4	English		May 1716 – December 1716
1717–1719	Curieuses Cabinet ausländischer und anderer Merckwürdigkeiten [Elektronische Ressource] / eröffnet von Antonio Paullini	German	Antonio Paullini d.i. Johann Jacob Schmauß	Franckfurt; Leipzig : Renger, Eingang 1.1717 - 6.1719; discontinued after that number
1717–1717	The Monitor	English		
1717–1720	Altes und Neues aus der gelehrten Welt	German		Zürich : Geßner, Nr. 1.1717 - 12.1720
1717–1718	The Entertainer	English		No. 1 (6 November 1717) - No. 10 (8 January 1718), No. 12 (22 January 1718) - No. 16 (19 February 1718), No. 18 (5 March 1718) - No. 20 (19 March 1718), No. 24 (16 April 1718) - No. 43 (27 August 1718)
1718–1719	Die abentheuerliche Welt in einer Pickelheeringskappe, oder satyrische Gedichte	German	Johan Friedrich Riederer	Nürnberg 1.1718 - 8.1719[?]
1718–1737	Nova litteraria eruditorum in gratiam divulgata	Latin		Lipsiae [u.a.], 1718–1737[?], also known as: Nova litteraria in supplementum actorum eruditorum divulgata, appeared as supplement of the Neue Zeitungen von gelehrten Sachen : auf das Jahr ... (1715–1784).
1718–1718	The Critick	English		
1718–1718	The Doctor	English		
1718–1718	The Fish-Pool	English		
1718–1719	The Free-Thinker: Or, Essays of Wit and Humour. Volume 1-3	English		
1718–1719	The Honest Gentleman	English		No. 1-8 (Wednesday 5 November 1718 – Wednesday 24 December 1718); No. 11–25 (Wednesday 25 January 1719 – Wednesday 22 April 1719)
1718–1719	The Old Whig	English		No. 1 (19 March 1718-19), No. 2 (2 April 1719)
1718–1719	The Plebeian	English		No. 1 (14 March 1718-19), No. 2 (23 March 1718-19), No. 3 (30 March 1719), No. 4 (6 April 1719)
1718–1730	Sammlung von Natur- und Medicin- wie auch hierzu gehörigen Kunst-und Literatur-Geschichten ("Breslauische Sammlungen")	German	Johann Georg Brunschwitz, Andreas Elias Buechner, Johann Kanold, Johann Christian Kundmann, Heinrich Winckler	Continued as Miscellanea physico-medico-mathematica (1731–1734)
1719–1725	Curieuser Avisen- oder Zeitungs-Schlüssel : das ist historische Nachrichten und Erklärungen, derer in denen wöchentlichen Zeitungen unvollkommen angezogenen Begebenheiten, auch vorkommenden fremden und unbekandten Wörter, denen jenigen welche ausser denen wöchentlichen Avisen weiter keine gründliche Nachrichten haben können zum besten und nützlichen Gebrauch in zwanzig Oefnungen ans Licht gestellet	German		Braunschweig : Schröder, 1719–1725, Oefnung 1.1719; 2.1719 - 20.1722; 21.1725; discontinued after that number
1719–1719	The Mirrour	English		
1719–1719	The Spinster, in Defence of the Woollen Manufactures	English		
1720–1725	Acta literaria Sueciae	Latin		Upsaliae; Stockholmiae : Russwormnis 1.1720/24 - 2.1725/29
1720–1750	Fortgesetzte Sammlung von alten und neuen theologischen Sachen : darinnen von Büchern, Uhrkunden, Controversien, Veränderungen, Anmerckungen und Vorschlägen u.d.g. ... nützl. Nachricht ertheilet wird; auff das Jahr ...	German		Leipzig : Jacobi, 1720–1750, 1720–1740: Leipzig : Braun. Continuation of the Unschuldige Nachrichten von alten und neuen theologischen Sachen, Büchern, Uhrkunden, Controversien, Veränderungen, Anmerckungen, Vorschläge u.d.g. : auff d. Jahr ...
1720, 1725	The Humourist: Being Essays Upon Several Subjects	English		
1720–1720	The Anti-Theatre, by Sir John Falstaffe	English		
1720–1720	The Theatre	English		
1720–1721	The Director	English		
1720–1723	Cato's Letters, Volumes 1–4	English		
1720–1731	The London Journal	English		No. 76 (Saturday, 7 January 1720); No. 79–141 (Saturday 28 January 1720 – Saturday 7 April 1722); No. 143–154 (Saturday 21 April 1722 – Saturday 7 July 1722); No. 156 (Saturday 21 July 1722); No. 158 (Saturday 4 August 1722); No. 161–168 (Saturday 25 August 1722 – Saturday 13 October 1722); No. 171 (Saturday 3 November 1722); No. 177 (Saturday 15 December 1722); No. 261 (Saturday 25 July 1724); No. 522 (Saturday 2 August 1729); No. 528 (Saturday 13 September 1729); No. 577 (Saturday 22 August 1730); No. 597–598 (Saturday 9 January 1731 – Saturday 16 January 1731); No. 613 (Saturday 24 April 173)
1721–1722	Die Discourse der Mahlern / Gesellschaft der Mahler zu Zürich	German	Johann Jacob Bodmer, Johann Jakob Breitinger	Zürich 1.1721 - 3.1722
1721–1722	The Whitehall Evening Post	English		
1722–1725	Critica musica : d.i. Grundrichtige Untersuch- und Beurtheilung, vieler, theils vorgefaßten, theils einfältigen Meinungen, Argumenten und Entwürffe, so in ... musicalischen Schriften zu finden ...	German	Johann Mattheson	Hamburg; T. 1.1722/23 - 2.1725 = Ps. 1-8 = St. 1–24[?]
1724–1726	Der Patriot	German		
1724–1811; 1811–1825	Mercure de France	French		Continuation of the Mercure Galant
1725–1726	Die vernünftigen Tadlerinnen	German	Johann Christoph Gottsched	Franckfurt; Leipzig : Braun 1.1725 – 2.1726(1727); discontinued with that number;
1725–1725	Lettres familieres, instructives et amusantes : sur divers sujets	French		Paris : Cavellier [u.a.] 1.1725, Jan.[?]
1725–1727	New memoirs of literature: Containing an Account of new books printed both at Home and Abroad, with dissertations	English	Michael de la Roche	Previous title: Memoirs of literature : containing a weekly account of the state of learning, both at home and abroad London 1710–1722.
1726–1726	The Country Gentleman	English		No. 1 (11 March 1726) – No. 84 (26 December 1726)
1727–1727	Das Merckwürdige Wienn oder monathliche Unterredungen von verschiedenen, daselbst befindlichen Merckwürdigkeiten der Natur und Kunst	German		Wienn : New, 1727, Jan.-Martius
1727–	Die vernünftigen Tadlerinnen	German		
1727–1785	Recueil de l'Académie des Belles-Lettres, Sciences et Arts de Marseille	French		Aix : Mouret 1727–1783/85(1785)[?]
1727–1727	The Ladies Journal	English		
1728–1758	Historisch-politische Merckwürdigkeiten in denen Weltstaaten : deren wöchentlich einlauffenden Nouvellen	German		Magdeburg 1728,1(23.Febr.) - 1758,26
1728–1728	The Parrot. By Mrs. Prattle	English		
1728–1736	The Present State of the Republick of Letters, Volume 1-18	English	Andrew Reid	
1728–1729	Der musicalische Patriot	German	Johann Mattheson	
1729–1740	Lettres sérieuses et badines sur les ouvrages des savans et sur d'autres matières	French		La Haye : Van Duren 1.1729 - 12.1740; discontinued after that number
1729–1745	Mémoires pour servir à l'histoire des hommes illustres dans la république des lettres : avec un catalogue raisonné de leurs ouvrages/ par Niceron.	French		Paris : Briasson 1.1729 - 43.1745
1729–1738	Monathliche Unterredung von dem Reiche der Geister zwischen Andrenio und Pneumatophilo	Italian		Leipzig : Walther 1.1729(1730) - 3.1738 = St.1-17
1729–1729	The Tribune	English		
1730–1735	La Storia delle opere dell'Accademia Reale delle Iscrizioni e delle Belle Lettere	Italian		Venezia 1.1730[?]
1730–1735	The Free Briton	English		
1731–1738	Der genealogische Archivarius : welcher alles, was sich unter den ietztlebenden hohen Personen in der Welt an Geburten, Vermählungen, Avancements und Todes-Fällen veränderliches zuträgt, mit Eindrückung vieler Lebens-Beschreibungen sorgfältig anmercket ... / ans Licht gestellt von Michael Ranfft.	German	Michael Ranfft	Leipzig : Heinsius 1.1731(1732); 2.1732 - 6.1736 = T. 1-30. new title: Der genealogisch-historische Archivarius Leipzig : Heinsius 7.1737 – 8.1738 = pts. 31–50.
1731–1734	Miscellanea physico-medico-mathematica	German		Continuation of the Breslauischen Sammlungen (1718–1730)
1731–1907	The Gentleman's Magazine	English		Monthly
1732–1734	Beyträge zur critischen Historie der deutschen Sprache, Poesie und Beredsamkeit, herausgegeben von einigen Liebhabern der deutschen Litteratur.	German	Johann Christoph Gottsched	[1].1732/33 = Stück 1-4
1732–1734	Curieuses Welt- und Staats-Cabinett, welches bey jedem Monathe durchs gantze Jahr ... in fünf Capitibus, unparteyisch und zuverläßige Nachrichten in sich begreiffet .. : mit einem vollständigen Register versehen von Wahrenburgio. -	German		Erffurt : Mynitzsch 1732, Jan. – 1734, Dec.[?]
1732–1733	Journal historique de la république des lettres	French		Leyde 1.1732 – 3.1733[?]
1732–1785	The London Magazine	English		
1732–1732	The Universal Spy: Or, the Royal Oak Journal Reviv'd	English		No. 1 (April 29, 1732) – No. 3 (May 13, 1732); No. 5 (August 5, 1732) – No. 8 (September 9, 1732); No. 12 (Sept 22 1732)
1732–1733	Parker's Penny Post	English		
1732–1733	The Comedian, Or Philosophical Enquirer	English		
1733–1733	B. Berington's Evening Post	English		
1734–1734	Anecdotes ou Lettres secrettes sur divers sujets de littérature & de politique.	French		[Amsterdam] 1734
1735–1756	Die neue europäische Fama, welche den gegenwärtigen Zustand der vornehmsten Höfe entdecket	German		Leipzig, Th. 1.1735 – 191/192.1756, Vorgänger: Die europäische Fama, welche den gegenwärtigen Zustand der vornehmsten Höfe entdecket
1736–1736	The Dublin Evening Post	English		Vol. 4 (1736), No. 51–85 (3 January – 1 May); No. 87–98 (8 May – 15 June); No. 100 (22 June); No. 103–104 (3 – 6 July); Vol. 5 (1736), No. 3-33 (17 July – 30 October), No. 35–42 (6 – 30 November); and No. 45–50 (11 – 28 December)
1737–1740	Osservazioni letterarie : che possono servire di continuazione al Giornale de'letterati d'Italia	Italian		Verona, 1.1737 - 6.1740[?]. Before as: Giornale de'letterati d'Italia (1710–1740)
1738–1771	Franckfurtische gelehrte Zeitungen, darinnen die merkwürdigsten der Gelehrten Welt	German		Franckfurt a. M. : (S. Tob. Stocken u. A.), 1736–1771 vols. 1–36, 4to, two numbers per week
1738–1739	Mémoires secrets de la république des lettres, ou le théâtre de la vérité	French	Jean Baptiste de Boyer d'Argens	Amsterdam : Desbordes 1.1737 - 3.1738(1739)[?]
1738–1739	Old Common Sense: Or, the Englishman's Journal	English		No. 49–152 (Saturday 7 January 1738 – Saturday 29 December 1739)
1739–1752	Göttingische Zeitungen von gelehrten Sachen online	German		Göttingen: Universitätsbuchhandlung, appears every Monday and Thursday, about 130 numbers per year covering all the sciences; yearly indices, the 1747 volume detailed.
1739–1740	The Champion: Containing a Series of Papers, Humorous, Moral, Political and Critical. Volume 1–2	English	Henry Fielding	
1740–1759	Nederlandsch gedenkboek of Europische Mercurius	Dutch		Continuation of the Europische Mercurius (1690–1739)
1740–1741	Potsdammische Quintessentz von alten und neuen politisch-historisch- und gelehrten Sachen	German		Berlin : Henning. 1740,1(Dec.14)-6(Dec.31); 1741,1(Jan.3)–103(Dec.30)[?]
1740–1741	The Christian's Amusement	English		No. 1 – No. 27
1741–1741	Kurzgefaßte Geschichte des Jahres : ... enthaltend die merkwürdigsten politischen, Kirchen-, Gelehrten-, auch Handlungs- und Natur-Begebenheiten; als Handbuch der neuesten Historie für Gelehrte und Ungelehrte eingerichtet	German	Johann Gottfried Groß	Christian-Erlangen : Selbstverl. des Hrsg.; Nürnberg : Homann, 1741–1741, Continuation of the Historie des Jahrs (1715–1730).
1741–1742	The Weekly History: Or, An Account of the Most Remarkable Particulars relating to the Present Progress of the Gospel	English		No. 28 (17 October 1741), No. 1 (11 April 1741) – No. 84 (13 November 1742)
1741–1742	Giornale de'letterati pubblicato in Firenze	Italian		Firenze, 1.1742 - 7.1757,1; N.S. 1.1785 - 8.1788
1742–1742	The York Courant	English		
1743–1747	Bemühungen zur Beförderung der Kritik und des guten Geschmacks	German	Johann Andreas Cramer	
1744–1744	The Spy at Oxford and Cambridge: In several Letters between John Perspective and Critical Would-be, Esqrs	English		
1744–1746	The Female Spectator, Volume 1–4	English		
1746–1746	The Fool, Volume 1–2	English		
1746–1747	The Museum: Or, the Literary and Historical Register. Volumes 1–3	English		Volume 1, No. 1-13 (Saturday 29 March 1746 – Saturday 13 September 1746), Volume 2, No. 14–26 (Saturday 27 September 1746 – Saturday 14 March 1747), Volume 3, No. 27–39 (Saturday 28 March 1747 – Saturday 12 September 1747),
1746–1746	The National Journal: Or, Country Gazette	English		
1746–1746	The Northampton Mercury	English		
1746–1746	The Parrot. With a Compendium of the Times	English		
1747–1757	Geschichte der königlichen Akademie der schönen Wissenschaften zu Paris : darinnen zugleich unzählige Abhandlungen aus allen freyen Künsten, gelehrten Sprachen, und Alterthümern enthalten sind. / Aus dem Französischen übersetzt. Mit einer Vorrede ans Licht gestellet von Johann Christoph Gottsched	German	Académie des Inscriptions et Belles-Lettres, Johann Christoph Gottsched, Luise Adelgunde Victoria Gottsched	Vol. 1 (1747) - Vol. 11 (1757), Übersetzung der Histoire de l'Académie Royale des Inscriptions et Belles-Lettres (Paris: Panckoucke, 1663–1781)
1747–1747	The Lady's Weekly Magazine	English		

== Established 1750–1799 ==
Period	Title	Language	Responsibilities	Publishing history
1750–1750	The Bee Reviv'd: Or, the Prisoner's Magazine, for the Benefit of the Compiler, a Prisoner for Debt in Whitechapel Jail	English		
1750–1751	The Kapellion, or Poetical Ordinary	English		
1751–1754	Bemühungen der Weltweisen vom Jahr 1700 biss 1750 oder Nachrichten von ihren Schriften und Auszüge online	German	Christian Ernst von Windheim	Nürnberg : Monath, 1751–1754.
1751–1751	The Royal Magazine; or, Quarterly Bee: For January, February and March 1751	English		
1752–1752	The Covent Garden Journal	English		
1753–1754	Der Königlichen Akademie der Aufschriften und Schönen Wissenschaften zu Paris, ausführliche Schriften : darinnen unzähliche Abhandl. aus allen freyen Künsten, gelehrten Sprachen, u. Alterthümern, enthalten sind / aus d. Franz. übers. von Luisen Adelgunden Victor. Gottschedinn.	German	Leipzig : Siegert; parts 1.1753 - 2.1754[?]	
1753–1759	Neue Erweiterungen der Erkenntnis und des Vergnügens.	German		Leipzig: Lankisch, 1.1753 - 12.1759/62 = Stück 1-71/72.
1753–1753	The Adventurer	English		
1753–1756	The World, Volumes 1–4	English		
1754–1756	Der Freund	German	Johann Peter Uz, Johann Friedrich von Cronegk, Johann Zacharias Leonhard Junkheim, Georg Ludwig Hirsch, Johann Georg Rabe	Anspach : Posch; 1.1754 – 3.1756 = Nos. 1–78
1754–1756	Gotth. Ephr. Leßings theatralische Bibliothek	German	Gotthold Ephraim Lessing	Berlin : Voß, Stück 1.1754 – 4.1758; discontinued with that number;
1754, 1756, 1760, 1763, 1766	The Whitehal Evening Post; Or, London Intelligencer	English		No. 1283 (6 Aug 1754); No. 1599 (22 May 1756); No. 2161 (24 Jan 1760); No. 2278 (23 Oct 1760); 2623–2624 (2–11 Jan 1763); No. 3170–3171 (2–4 Sep 1766); No. 3173 (9 Sep 1766); No. 3175–3183 (13 Sep – 3 Oct 1766); No. 3184 (4 Oct 1766); No. 3185 (7 Oct 1766); No. 3187 (11 Oct 1766); No. 3189–3196 (16 Oct – 1 Nov 1766); No. 3198–3199 (8 Nov 1766)
1754–1754	The Connoisseur: By Mr. Town, Critic and Censor-General	English	George Colman the Elder, Bonnell Thornton, Edward Moore	
1754–1754	The Entertainer	English		
1755–1757	Acta litteraria regni Poloniae et magni ducatus Lithuaniae	Latin		Varsariae; Lipsiae 1755–1757
1755–1755	The Devil	English		
1755–1755	Urtheile über das Verhalten der Menschen	English		Frankfurt, M.; Leipzig : Keßler 1.1756 - 6.1758[?]
1756–1756	The Wife. By Mira	English		
1757–1765	Bibliothek der schönen Wissenschaften und freien Künste	German	Bände 1–4 Friedrich Nicolai und Moses Mendelssohn, 5-12 Christian Felix Weiße	Continuation: Neue Bibliothek der schönen Wissenschaften und freien Künste (1756–1806)
1757–1757	The Centinel	English		
1757–1757	The Con-test	English		
1757–1757	The Humanist	English		
1757–1757	The Rhapsodist	English		
1757–1758	Altonaische gelehrte Anzeigen	German		Altona 1.1757 - 2.1758
1758–1761	Der Nordische Aufseher	German	Johann Andreas Cramer	Kopenhagen; Leipzig : Ackermann 1.1758 - 3.1761 = Nr. 1-193; discontinued after that number
1759–1765	Briefe die neueste Literatur betreffend	German	Gotthold Ephraim Lessing, Moses Mendelssohn	Berlin; Stettin: Nicolai; 1.1759 - 23/24.1765/66; discontinued after that number
1759–	Staats- und gelehrte Neuigkeiten	German	Georg Schade	
1759–1765	Briefe die neueste Literatur betreffend	German		
1760–1760	The British Magazine. Or Monthly Depository for Gentlemen & Ladies. Volume 1	English		
1760–1760	The Royal Female Magazine	English		
1761–1762	The Genius	English		
1762–1764	The Universal Museum. Or, Gentleman's and Ladies Polite Magazine of History, Politics and Literature for 1763. Volume 1-3	English		
1763–1763	Terrae-Filius	English		
1764–1776	Acta litteraria	German	Christian Adolph Klotz	Altenburgi : Richter 1.1764 - 7.1776
1764–1764	A Letter From J[oh]n W[ilke]s, Esq; in Paris, to a Noble Lord, in London	English		
1764–1764	The Budget: Inscribed to the Man, Who Thinks Himself Minister	English		
1764–1764	The North Briton	English		
1764–1764	The Wallet: A Supplementary Exposition of the Budget. Inscribed to the Man Who Knows Himself Minister	English		
1764–1764	Wilkes and Liberty: Or, the Universal Prayer	English		
1765–1796	Allgemeine Deutsche Bibliothek	German	Friedrich Nicolai	
1765–1806	Neue Bibliothek der schönen Wissenschaften und freien Künste	German		Continuation of the Bibliothek der schönen Wissenschaften und freien Künste (1756–1765)
1767	Hamburgische Dramaturgie	German	Gotthold Ephraim Lessing	
1767–1767	The Theatrical Monitor; Or, Green Room Laid Open	English		
1767–1770	The Political Register; and Impartial Review of New Books. Volume 1-7	English		
1768–1768	The Covent Garden Chronicle	English		
1770–1770	The Whisperer	English		
1771–1776	Der Deutsche	German	Edited by Johann Gottwerth von Müller, in cooperation with Johann Samuel Patzke and Johann Andreas Cramer	Magdeburg [etc.]: Hechtel, 1.1771 - 8.1776[?]
1772–1773	Die fränkischen Zuschauer bey gegenwärtigen besseren Aussichten für die Wissenschaften und das Schulwesen im Vaterlande : eine periodische Schrift zur Beförderung dieser guten Anfänge	German		Frankfurt; Leipzig : Sprenger, 1772–1773. Fortgesetzt unter dem Titel Litteratur des katholischen Deutschlands hrsg. von katholischen Patrioten (Koburg: Ahl, 1776–1788)
1772–1773	The York Chronicle; And Weekly Advertiser	English		
1773–1789	Acta litteraria Bohemiae et Moraviae	Latin		Pragae 1.1774/75 – 2.1776/83[?]
1773–1789	Der Teutsche Merkur	German	Christoph Martin Wieland	
1773–1794	Journal historique et littéraire	French		Until 1788: Luxembourg : Chevallier, dann Maestricht : Cavelier [u.a.], 1773–1794. Continuation of La clef du cabinet des princes de l'Europe (1704–1773)
1773–1790	Nuovo giornale de'letterati d'Italia	Italian		Modena : Soc. Tipogr., 1.1773 - 43.1790; Titel 7.1774 - 43.1790: Continuazione del Nuovo giornale de'letterati d'Italia; Vorgänger: Giornale de'letterati d'Italia (1710–1740)
1775–1775	The Gentleman	English		
1775–1776	The Crisis	English		
1776–1788	Litteratur des katholischen Deutschlands	German		Coburg : Ahl, 1776–1788, Previously: Die fränkischen Zuschauer bey gegenwärtigen besseren Aussichten für die Wissenschaften und das Schulwesen im Vaterlande: eine periodische Schrift zur Beförderung dieser guten Anfänge 1772–1773. Issues: 1.1775/77(1776) - 8.1787/88(1788), Mikrofiche-edition: Hildesheim : Olms, 1997. (Deutsche Zeitschriften des 18. und 19. Jahrhunderts). Continued: Auserlesene Litteratur des katholischen Deutschlands 5=1 - 8=4 von: Neue Litteratur des katholischen Deutschlands
1776–1776	The American Crisis, and a Letter to Sir Guy Carleton, on the Murder of Captain Huddy	English		
1776–1776	The Scots Spy, Or Critical Observer	English		
1776–1777	The Fall of Britain	English		
1778–1778	The Vocal Magazine; Or, British Songster's Miscellany. Containing all the English, Scotch and Irish Songs, Cantatas, Glees, Catches, Airs, Balads, &c.	English		
1780–1780	The London Mercury; Containing the History, Politics, Literature of England	English		
1780–1781	The Protestant Packet; Or, British Monitor, Volume 1–2	English		
1783–1783	The Political Magazine and Parliamentary, Naval, Military and Literary Journal. Volume 4	English		
1783–1796	Berlinische Monatsschrift	German	Johann Erich Biester, Friedrich Gedike	Nachfolgeorgane: Berlinischen Blätter (1797–1798) und Neue Berlinische Monatsschrift (1799–1811)
1784–1784	The Leeds Mercury	English		
1784–1786	The New Spectator; with the Sage Opinions of John Bull	English		
1785–1849	Allgemeine Literatur-Zeitung	German	Friedrich Justin Bertuch, Christian Gottfried Schütz Christoph Martin Wieland	
1785–1785	The London Packet; Or, New Lloyd's Evening Post	English		
1785–1785	The Political Herald and Review; or a Survey of Domestic and Foreign Politics; and a Critical Account of Political and Historical Publications. Volume 1	English		
1786–1787	The Devil: Containing a Review and Investigation of All Public Subjects Whatever, Volume 1-2	English		
1786–1787	The Microcosm, a Periodical Work, by Gregory Griffin, of the College of Eton	English		
1787–1787	The Busy Body; A Collection of Periodical Essays, Volume 1-2	English		
1787–1787	The Female Guardian. Designed to Correct Some of the Foibles Incident to Girls	English		
1787–1787	Variety: A Collection of Essays	English		
1787–1792	The Dublin Chronicle	English		
1788–1788	The Eaton Chronicle; Or, the Salt Box	English		
1788–1792	The New London Magazine; Being a Universal and Complete Monthly Repository of Knowledge, Instruction, and Entertainment. Volumes 4-8	English		
1789–1789	The Prompter	English		
1789–1790	The Attic Miscellany; or, Characteristic Mirror of Men and Things. Including the Correspondent's Museum. Volume 1-2	English		
1789–1792	Orpheus. Eggy Hónapos Irás, a' Jozan Gondolkozásnak, Igazabb Izlésnek és Magyar Történeteknek Elő Segéllésére.	Hungarian	Ferenc Kazinczy	Two volumes with 4-4 issues.
1789–1792	A' Mindenes Gyülytemény.	Hungarian	József Péczeli	Released as a journal in 1789-90, then as a yearbook in 1791-92.
1790–1790	The Speculator	English		
1790–1793	The Bee, Or Literary Weekly Intelligencer, Consisting of Original Pieces, and Selections from Performances of Merit, Foreign and Domestic. A Work Calculated to Disseminate Useful Knowledge Among All Ranks of People at a Small Expense. By James Anderson. Volume 1-16	English	James Anderson of Hermiston	
1791–1791	The English Freeholder	English		
1792–1793	Genius of Kent; or, County Miscellany	English		
1792–1793	The Crisis: A Collection of Essays Written in the Years 1792 and 1793	English		
1793–1793	The Female Mentor: Or, Select Conversations. Volume 1-3	English		
1793–1794	Hog's Wash, or a Salmagundy for Swine. Volume 1, Part 1-2	English		
1794–1794	Pigs' Meat; or, Lessons for the Swinish Multitude	English		
1794–1797	The Morning Advertiser	English		
1795–1796	The Tribune, Consisting Chiefly of the Political Lectures of J. Thelwall. Volume 1-3	English	John Thelwall	
1795–1796	The Trifler	English		
1796–1796	The Watchman	English	Samuel Taylor Coleridge	
1797–1798	Berlinische Blätter	German	Johann Erich Biester	folgt der Berlinischen Monatsschrift (1783–1796), Continued as Neue Berlinische Monatsschrift (1799–1811).
1796–1797	The Flapper, Volume 1-2	English		
1796–1797	The Quiz, by a Society of Gentleman	English		
1797–1797	The Morning Post and Fashionable World	English		
1797–1797	The Phoenix	English		
1798–1798	Anti-Union	English		
1798–1799	The Oeconomist, Or, Englishman's Magazine. Volume 1-2	English		
1799–1811	Neue Berlinische Monatsschrift	German	Friedrich Nicolai	folgt der Berlinischen Monatsschrift (1783–1796) und den Berlinischen Blättern (1797–1798)

== See also ==
- Moral Weekly
- List of early modern newspapers

== Literature ==
- M. P. H., Curieuse Nachricht von denen heute zu Tage grand mode gewordenen Journal- Quartal- und Annual-Schrifften (Freyburg Jena, 1716).
- H. P. L. M., Gründliche Nachricht von den frantzösischen, lateinischen und deutschen Journalen, Ephemeridibus, monatlichen Extracten, oder wie sie sonsten Nahmen haben mögen (Leipzig/ Gardeleben: H. Campe, 1718).
- Thomas Habel, Gelehrte Journale und Zeitungen der Aufklärung. Zur Entstehung, Entwicklung und Erschließung deutschsprachiger Rezensionszeitschriften des 18. Jahrhunderts (Bremen: Ed. Lumière, 2007), ISBN 3-934686-28-1.
- 17th-18th Century Burney Collection Newspapers Title List
