= Andrew Reid (writer) =

Scottish writer (died c. 1767)

Andrew Reid (died c. 1767) was a Scottish writer.

== Life ==
Reid moved to London, probably about 1720, and interested himself in literary and scientific subjects. In 1728, he launched The Present State of the Republick of Letters, a periodical which he edited until 1736, when it ceased; two volumes appeared each year. An influence on the publication was the earlier editor Michel de La Roche.

Reid attended James Thomson in his last illness, in 1748. It is presumed that he died in 1767.

== Works ==
In 1732, Reid published an abridgment of Isaac Newton's The Chronology of Ancient Kingdoms Amended, of which another edition appeared at Dublin in 1782. In 1733, in with John Gray, he edited an Abridgment of the Philosophical Transactions from 1720 to 1732; it was published in two volumes.

In 1747, Reid published a Letter to Dr. Hales concerning the Nature of Tar, and in 1767 an Essay on Logarithms, which he dedicated to his old friend John Gray. In the same year, he was employed by George Lyttelton, 1st Baron Lyttelton to correct for the press the first two editions of his History of the Life of Henry II. The correction of the third edition, which appeared in 1768, was entrusted to another. Elements of the Theory and Practice of Chymistry (appearing in 1775 as a third edition) was translation from a work by Pierre Joseph Macquer.
