= Andreas Stübel =

Andreas Stübel, also: Stiefel (15 December 1653 – 31 January 1725) was a German Lutheran theologian, pedagogue and philosopher.

== Career ==
Born in Dresden the son of an innkeeper, Stübel attended the school at Meißen from 1668. After the Abitur, he studied philosophy, philology and theology at the University of Leipzig, graduating in 1674 a Baccalaureus and in 1676 a Magister of philosophy. He then worked as a private teacher. From 1682 he was Tertius at the Old St Nicholas School (Nikolaischule) in Leipzig, promoted to Konrektor in 1684. In 1687 he was a Baccalaureus of theology, appointed a private lecturer at the Leipzig University. In 1697 he lost the position due to theological disputes. He died in Leipzig.

== Selected works ==
- Neues Leipziger Wörterbuch (1703)

== Literature ==
- Friedrich Koldewey (1893). "Stübel, Andreas" . Allgemeine Deutsche Biographie (in German). Vol. 36. Leipzig: Duncker & Humblot. pp. 702–704.
