= Peter Zorn =

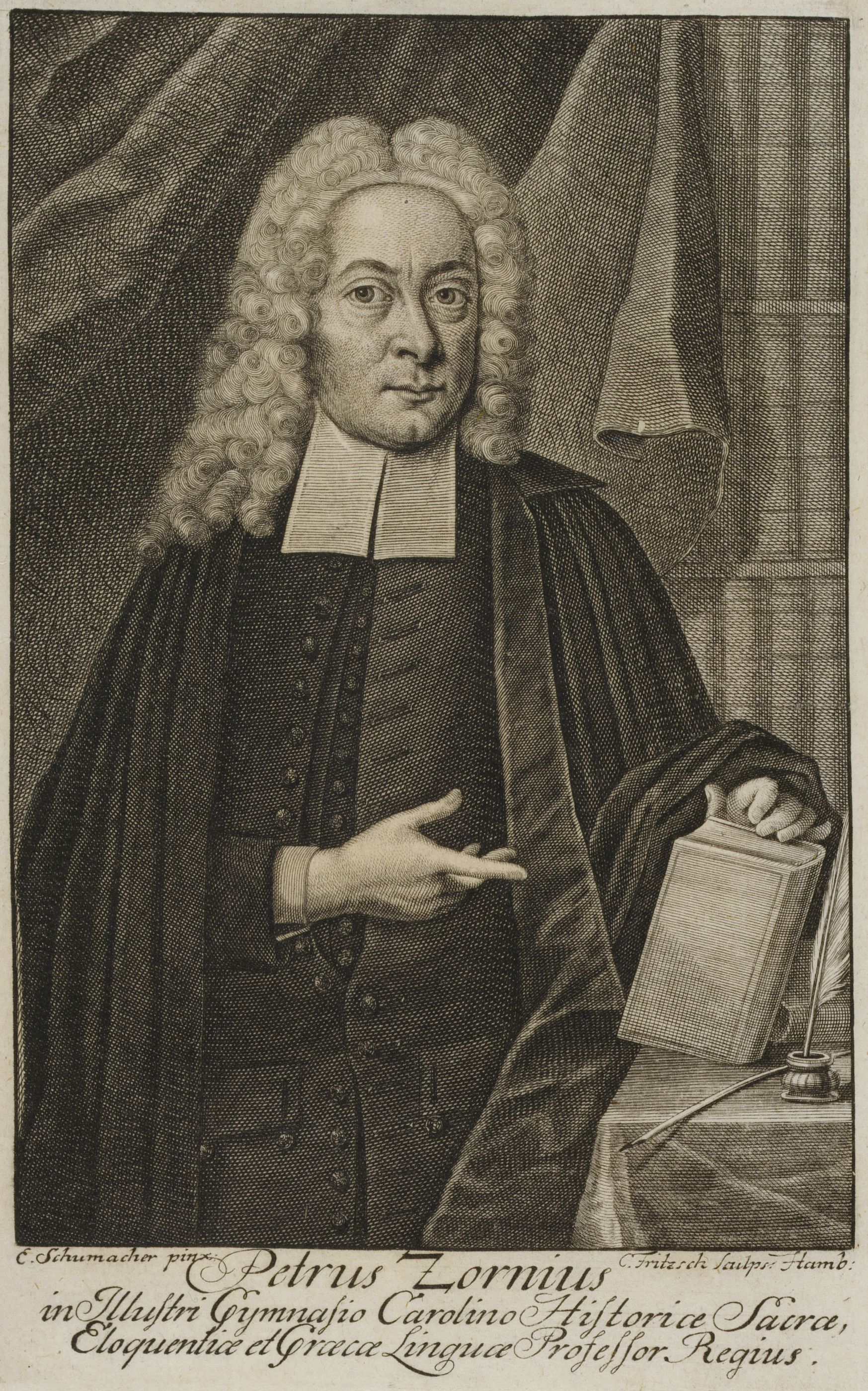

Peter Zorn (22 May 1682 – 23 January 1746) was a German librarian and philologist and Protestant theologian.

From his childhood, Peter Zorn studied the Greek language and by the age of fourteen he had translated several books. At eighteen, he went to the University of Leipzig.

He received his bachelor's degree in theology in 1705 in Rostock and published several polemical writings.

He left Rostock, traveled to the Netherlands, returned to Germany and lived there two years where he gave lessons in Greek and antiquities. Upon leaving, he made an appearance in his hometown, accepted a place as rector of Plön, and remained there until trouble with the minister of the prince led him to resign.

Hamburg then offered him a pension, but he remained there only a few years and accepted the invitations to Prussia. He became a professor of rhetoric and history at Stettin and in 1729 he was professor of ecclesiastical history. Finally, from Stettin, he went to Thorn, then in Prussia, but now the city of Torun in Poland. In addition to being rector and professor, he was also the town librarian.
