= Valentin Ernst Löscher =

German orthodox Lutheran theologian

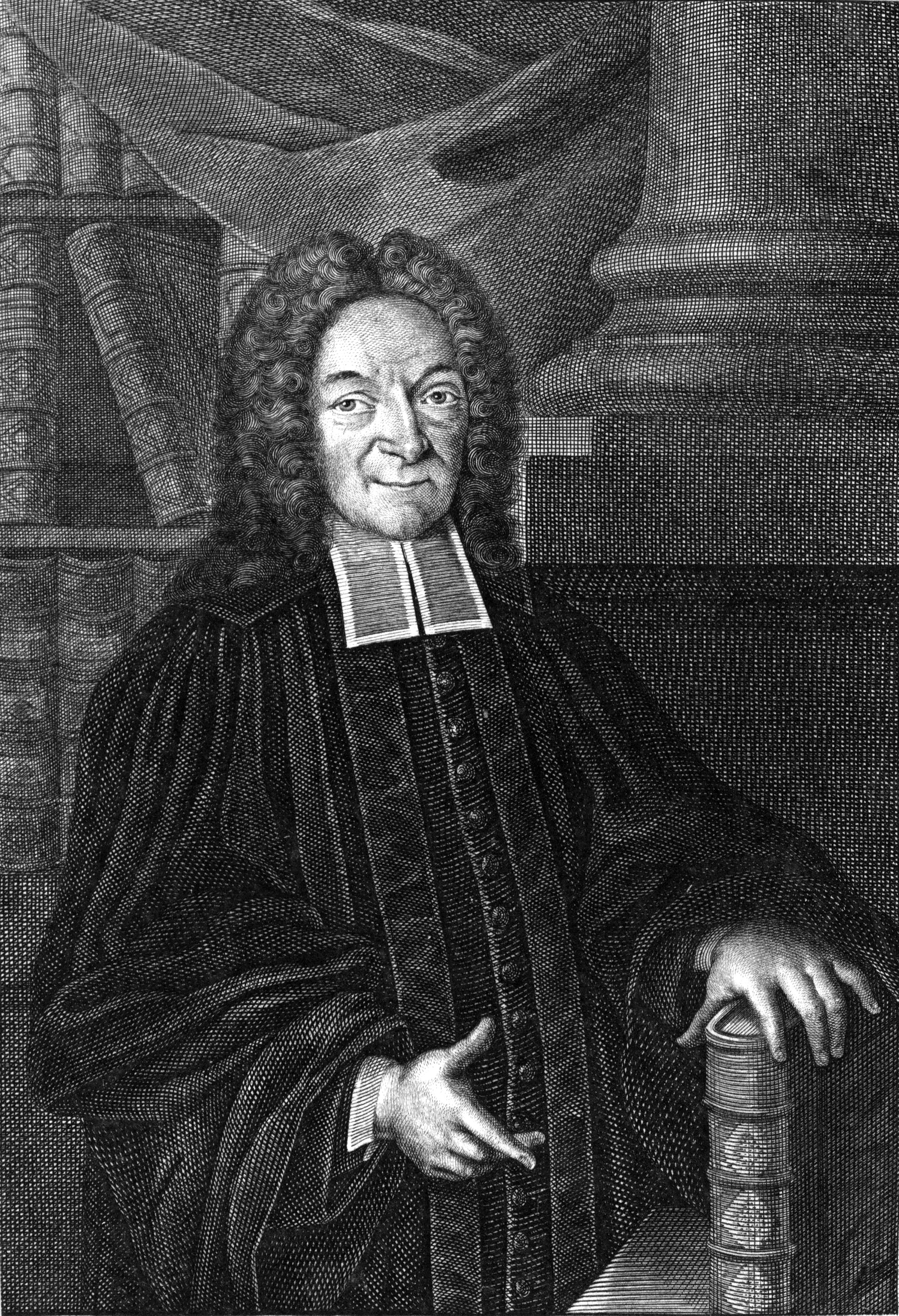
Valentin Ernst Löscher

Valentin Ernst Löscher (born at Sondershausen 29 December 1673; died at Dresden 12 December 1749) was a German orthodox Lutheran theologian.

At the University of Wittenberg, where his father was professor of theology, he gave his attention mainly to philology and history, but out of respect to his father's wish he selected a theological subject for his master's dissertation, in which he opposed the Pietistic position. Subsequent study at Jena aroused his interest in church history. During travels undertaken at this time he formed the acquaintance of a number of influential anti-Pietistic theologians. In 1696 he began to lecture at Wittenberg on the origin of Deism and Pietism. After serving as superintendent at Jüterbog (1698-1701) and Delitzsch (1701-07) and professor of theology at Wittenberg (1707–09), he became pastor of the Kreuzkirche and superintendent in Dresden. Here he remained the rest of his life. His practical duties here turned his attention more particularly to the needs of the Church. His orthodoxy did not prevent him from admitting the truth of the claims of the Pietists concerning the prevailing perfunctoriness of religious life, which he ascribed to the negligence of orthodox pastors. He at once took earnest measures to encourage a deeper spiritual life in the Church. He had already begun the publication of his Unschuldige Nachrichten von alten und neuen theologischen Sachen (Wittenberg and Leipzig, 1701 sqq.), the first theological periodical. The comprehensive scope and able management of the magazine gave it great importance. Through it Löscher became the leader of the orthodox party, as opposed to the Pietistic and naturalistic factions in the Lutheran Church, and the representative of scientific Lutheran theology.

In opposition to the proposal that Pietism should be considered the best means of promoting the union of the Lutheran and the Reformed Churches (advocated at the time by the Prussian Government), Löscher published several works, including Ausführliche Historia motuum zwischen den Evangelisch-Lutherischen und Reformierten (3 parts, Frankfort, 1707–08). In the course of a controversy with the Pietist Joachim Lange, Löscher defended orthodoxy in his Praenotiones et notiones theologicae (Wittenberg, 1708). However, his most comprehensive criticism of Pietism appeared in his magazine under the title Timotheus Verinus, in which work he held that the Pietists had a false conception of the relation between piety and religion and that their zeal for piety placed them in opposition to the doctrine of justification by faith. The work inspired a bitter reply from his Pietistic opponents, which called forth from Löscher his greatest work, Vollständiger Timotheus Verinus (2 parts, Wittenberg, 1718-22. Eng. transl., The Complete Timotheus Verinus 1998, Northwestern Publishing House). In this he discusses the origin and rapid development of Pietism and elaborates upon its evils. Nevertheless, he was unable to check the advance of Pietism or even to pass a true judgment upon the real significance of the movement. The importance of Löscher's part in the Pietistic controversy was not fully recognized until the return to Evangelical doctrine in the nineteenth century.

Löscher took an active part also in the controversy which at that time was being waged against the Roman Catholic Church in Dresden and contributed a number of studies to that cause, notably his Vollständige Reformations-Akta und Documenta (3 vols., Leipzig, 1720–29). He also opposed Wolff's system of philosophy, claiming that "philosophical indifferentism" portended a revolution in Christianity.
