= Term Catalogue =

Quarterly list of books published

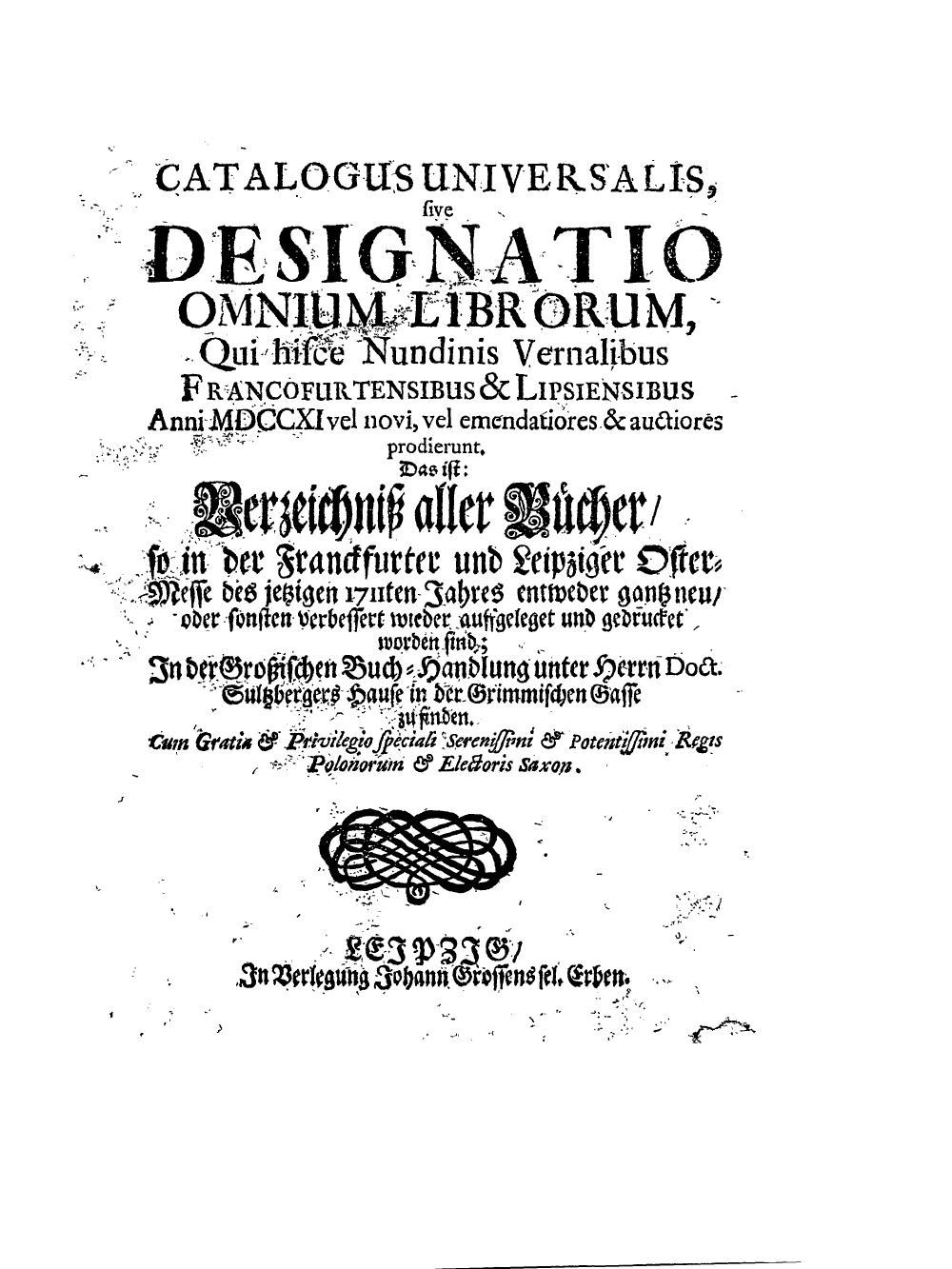
Title page of the German easter 1711 term catalogue

A Term Catalogue (German: Messkatalog) is a serial publication compiled to inform customers—most importantly book traders from other cities—of the book production as available on the book fairs. The first such catalogue was issued by Georg Willer in Augsburg in 1564. Several projects followed the model including the series of English Term Catalogues issued by John Starkey and Robert Clavell under the title Mercurius Librarius, or, a catalogue of books from 1668 to 1711. "Term" referred to the dates of the fairs that would be held as platforms of the trade.

The catalogues are a valuable source to researchers today, because they often give dates of the publication processes and information about working titles that were eventually dropped. The segmentation is of interest for its contemporary perspective on the market: a perspective modern literary histories no longer share.

== German Messkataloge, 1564 to 1860 ==
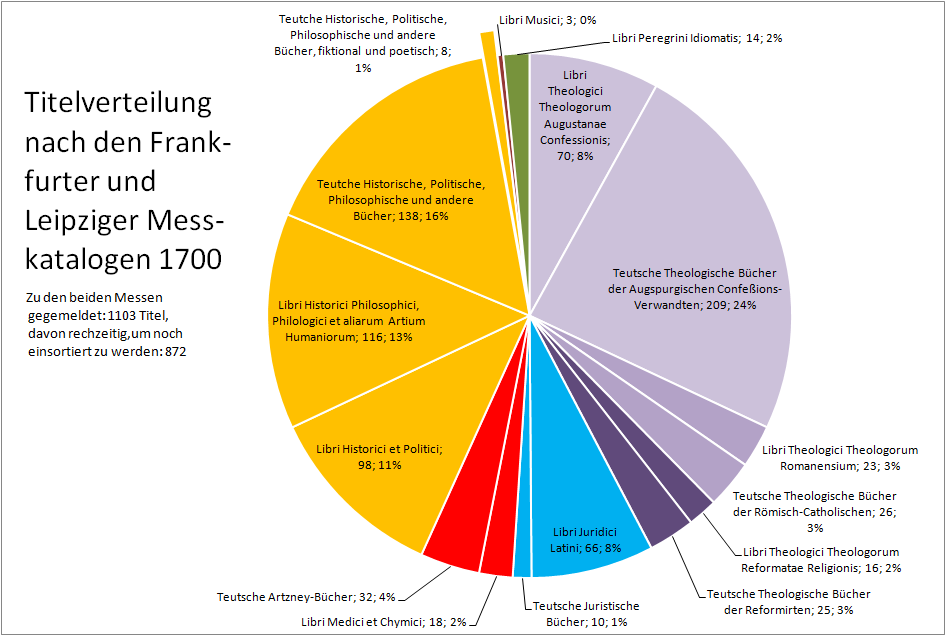
Statistical Analysis of the two German Term Catalogues 1700

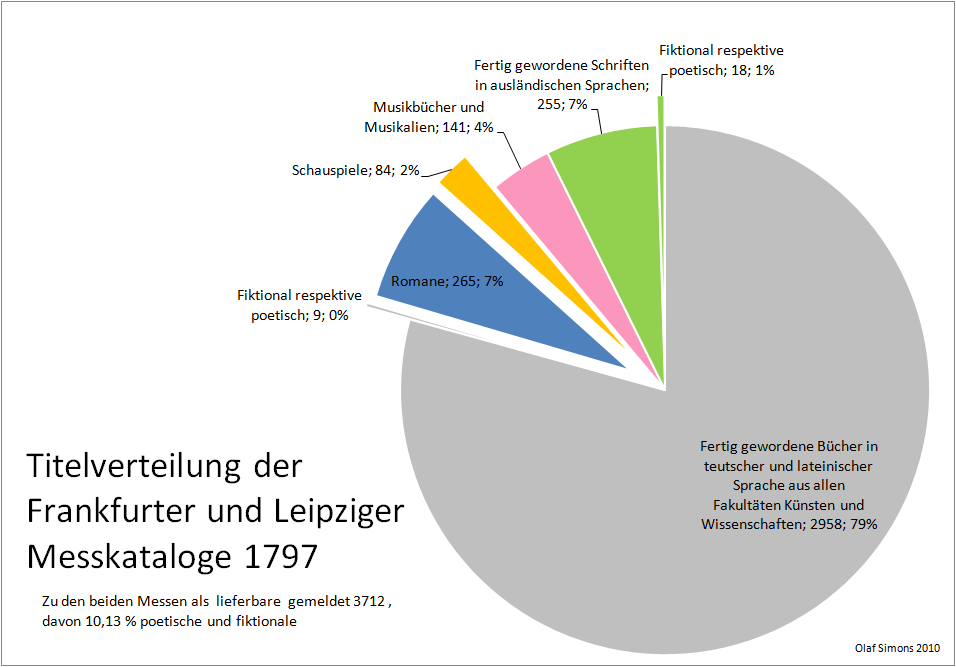
Statistical Analysis of the two German Term Catalogues 1797

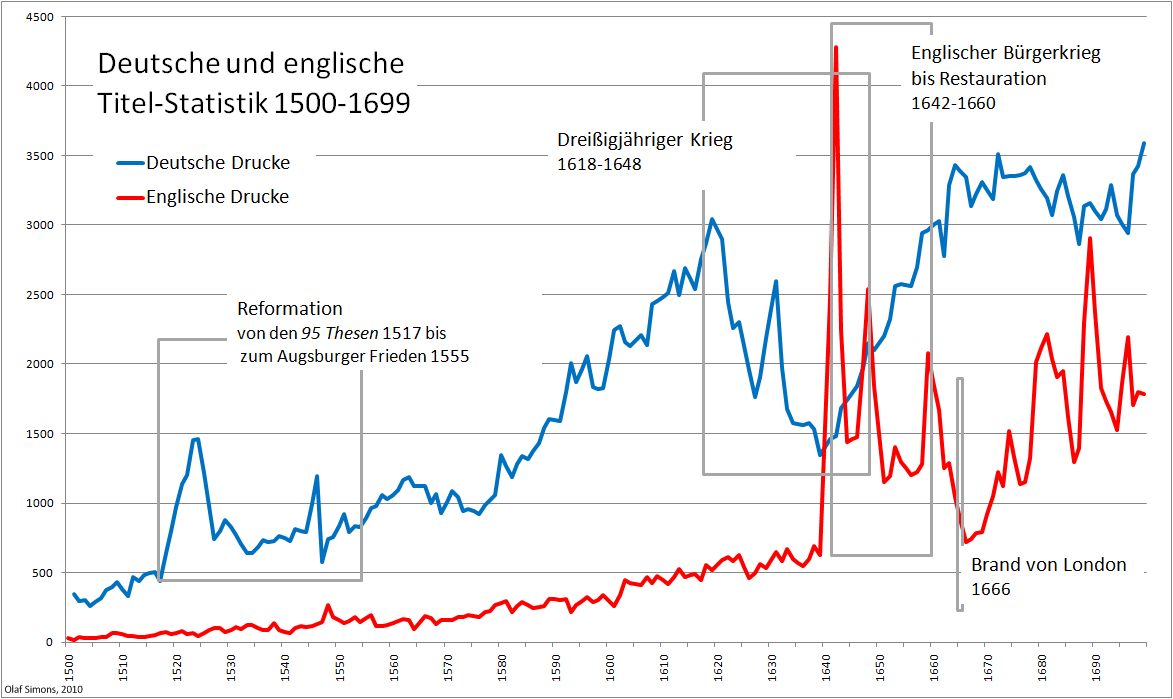
The German and the English press output in title numbers, Data from VD16, VD17 and ESTC. Diagram with historical events

The book trade of the German-speaking territories was for more than a century the model of all further European developments. The technological achievement of the printing press spread in Germany without the focus on a capital. Germany had cultural centre but a network of cities and territories in different affiliations. A fragmented decentralised geographical space had to be provided with books. Relatively small towns of 20,000 to 40,000 inhabitants created as early as the 1470s and 1480s the basic network of the new trade. Central fairs in Nördlingen, Frankfurt and Leipzig offered publishers from all over Germany, Austria and Switzerland in the course of the 16th century the option to change books they had published and thus to widen the scope of titles they could sell in their respective shops at home.

The first Term Catalogue published by Georg Willer in Augsburg in 1564 was supposed to inform his customers in Augsburg about books he had brought home from the last Frankfurt fair. Within the next two years his catalogue became an interesting platform Frankfurt traders would use to observe the market. Willer arranged to have his catalogue printed in Frankfurt where it soon turned from a retrospective into a prospective medium, into a catalogue issued to list all the books that would be offered on the upcoming fair.

His first catalogue showed a strong Latin production. Almost 73% percent of the titles he listed were published in the language of erudition. Most of the books fell into the theology sections. The four university faculties theology, law, medicine and – embracing all other subjects – philosophy set the catalogue's basic structure. Literature in the modern sense had no category of its own.

Category	Titles	Percentage
Libri theologici catholici non novi: hactenus vero in nostra Bibliotheca desiderati.	4	1,6 %
Libri theologici protestantium latini, & alij.	27	10,6 %
Libri theologici catholicorum, latini & alij.	40	15,7 %
Libri vtrioque ivre	32	12,5%
Libri medicinales, latini & græci	14	5,5 %
Libri historici, tam sacri quàm prophani: latini, &c.	17	6,7 %
Philosophici artiumque libri	34	13,3 %
Poetici libri in quolibet facultatum genere.	9	3,5 %
Astrologici et mathematici libri.	9	3,5 %
[German theological books of the Protestants.]	34	13,3 %
[German theological books of the Roman Catholics.]	8	3,1 %
[Law in German]	6	2,3 %
[Medicine in German]	7	2,7 %
[German historical books]	8	3,1 %
[Miscellanies].	6	2,3 %
Total	255	99,7 %
Books published in Latin	186	72,9%
Poetical and fictional titles	12	4,7%

Willer's project attracted competitors, three of whom gained the power to challenge his project at the turn into the 17th century: An independent Catholic platform appeared first in Mainz and then in Frankfurt. The city of Frankfurt began to promote a "privileged" imperial catalogue trying to use the catalogues as a platform of censorship. 1590 saw, thirdly, the arrival of a new catalogue designed to serve the Frankfurt and Leipzig book fairs, published from 1594 to 1860 in Leipzig.

The Leipzig fairs won the competition in the course of the 17th century. The unified catalogue issued in Leipzig became the central platform of information about books published in the course of this competition.

== English Term Catalogues, 1668 to 1711 ==
Catalogues had their own history on the English market long before the series initiated by John Starkey in 1668. Germany's catalogues had served as a model of a series of continental catalogues published by John Bill between 1617 and 1628. Bill's catalogues appeared twice a year as a digest of the Frankfurt Messkatalog. Between 1622 and 1626 it included supplements designed to add the English production.

The project of an independent conclusive English catalogue began, however, only in 1668 with Starkey's catalogues soon co-edited and then taken over by Robert Clavell. Clavell died on 8 August 1711. His death seems to have terminated the series. The publication had already become unstable in 1708 and 1709. A new catalogue appeared in 1711 under Clavell's mentorship after a gap of more than a year but it remained without a successor.

The usual rhythm of editions yielded four catalogues per year with issues sold at:

- Hillary (February)
- Easter (May)
- Trinity (June or July)
- Michaelmas (November or December)

The entire collection consists today of 161 catalogues. Some years have not reached the full number of four catalogues. The last catalogues printed in 1708 and 1709 were double editions covering two terms. 1670 saw two rival editions for both Easter and Trinity to mend a perceived deficiency in the official Starkey and Clavell catalogues. London's booksellers complained that their project had focused on publications that sold for more than a shilling, and that it lacked diligence. The complaint reveals that Starkey and Clavell were paid for each title they listed:

The Publishers of Mercurius Librarius, by their unreasonable demands for inserting the titles of Books; and also their imperfect Collecting; omitting many; and refusing all under 1sh[illing] [in] Price; hath occasioned the Printing of this Catalogue: wherein those defects are rectified.

Collected by, and printed for, the Booksellers of London.

A comparison of the numbers of titles listed in the late 17th and early 18th century term catalogues and numbers the English Short Title Catalogue provides justification for these complaints.

=== Structure and Scope ===
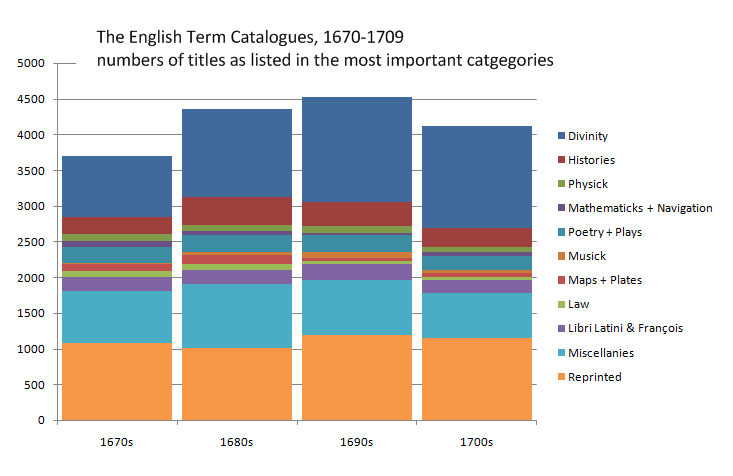
English Term Catalogues 1670–1709, listings in the most important categories per decade

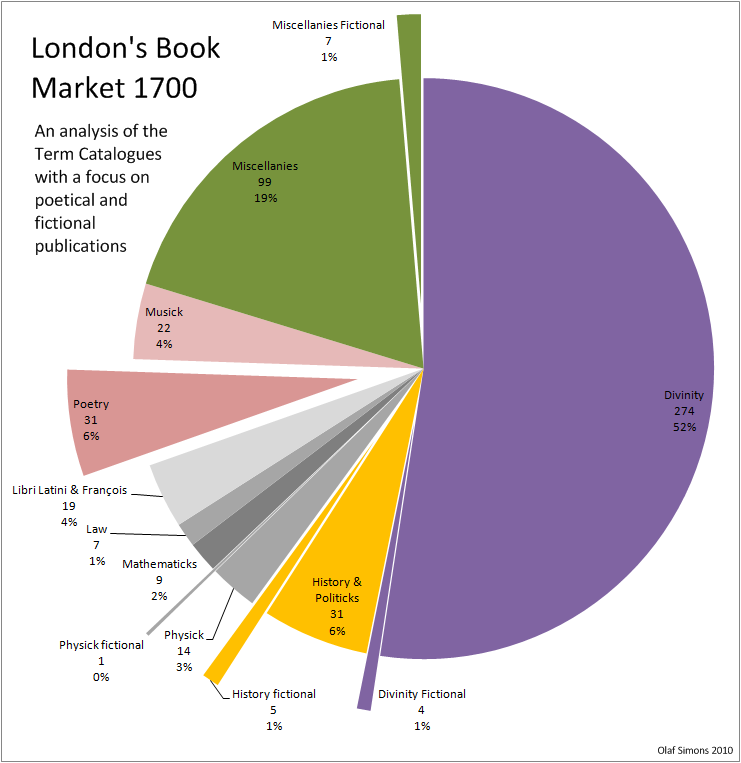
London's book market 1700, distribution of titles according to Term Catalogue data, after dissolving the "Reprinted" section. Poetic and fictional production does not yet have a unified place.

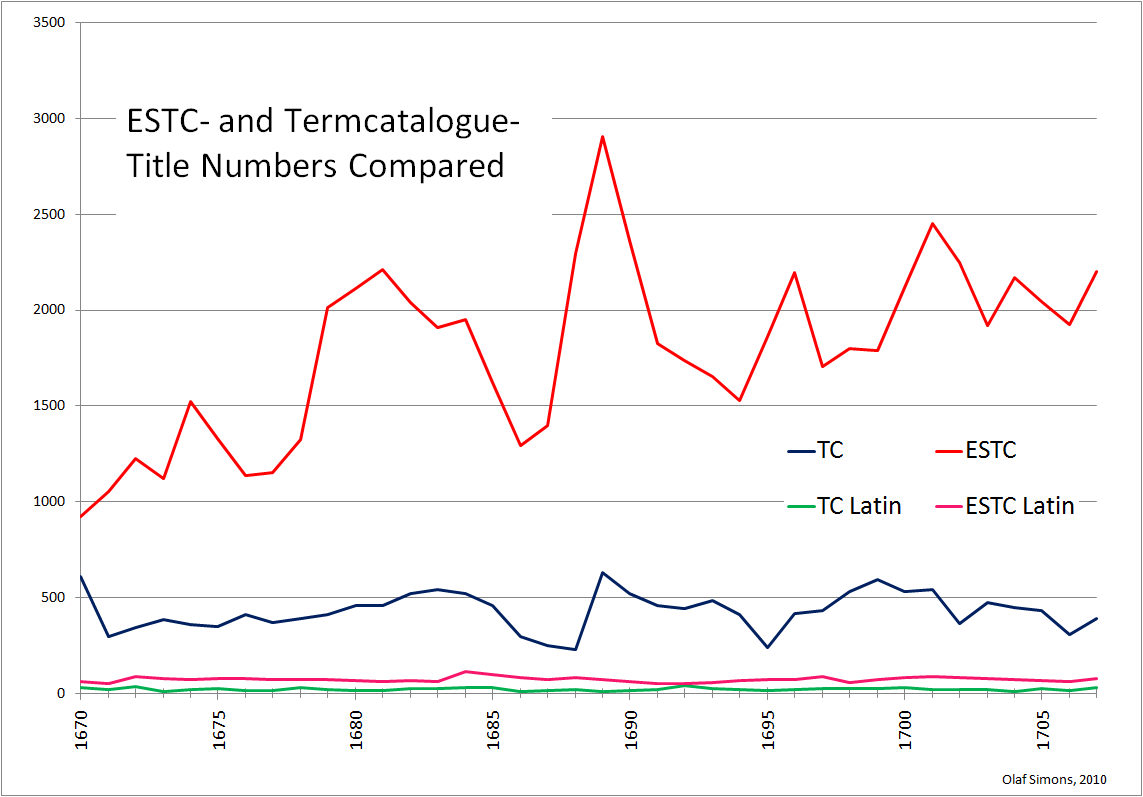
Comparison of title numbers as given by the ESTC and the Term Catalogues 1670-1709

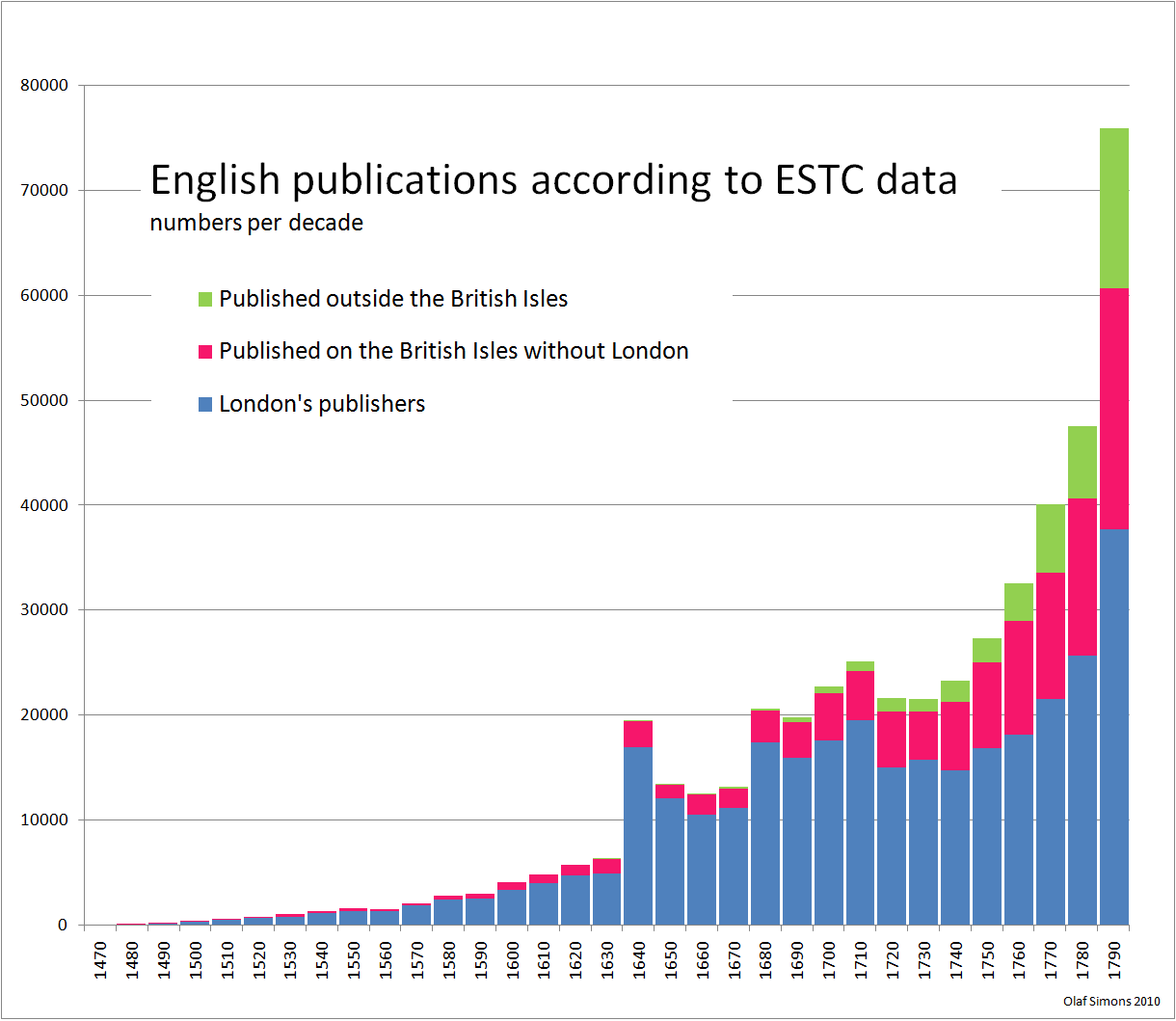
ESTC data 1477-1799 by decade given with a regional differentiation.

The 161 catalogues printed between 1668 and 1711 show an increase in the number of titles. The average catalogue listed 109 books under 10 headings. Some catalogues had up to 13 headings; the minimum was six in the small catalogue that appeared for Hillary 1708. The first catalogues had begun with 40 to 50 titles; later catalogues reached 150 to 200 titles. The Easter catalogue of 1689 listed the exceptional number of 293 books.

All catalogues opened with a Divinity section and closed with a section of books reprinted. Most of the catalogues offered additional advertisements at the end to announce ongoing projects looking for subscribers and sponsors. The sequence of categories in between varied. History was most often the second heading, Miscellanies usually the one before the Reprinted section. Other prominent headings were Physick (medicine), Mathematicks (comprising Architecture and Navigation in several of the catalogues), Poetry and Plays, Musick, Navigation, Globes, Maps, Cards, Charts, Plates (in the sense of illustrations), Law, Libri Latini (& François), Headings such as Architecture, Heraldry and Astrology remained rare.

None of the catalogues offered a unified section for fiction, or for literature in the modern sense. Novels were customarily listed among the "Histories"—the majority of which were non-fictional—and sometimes as "Miscellanies". The category "Poetry and Plays" was reserved for verse and stage plays.

The following table looks at all titles under the eleven most prominent headings, with a perspective on the decades and the overall trends:

Category/Decade	1670s	1680s	1690s	1700s
Divinity	858	1233	1479	1439
Histories	234	387	333	261
Physick	102	87	92	76
Mathematicks + Navigation	83	57	30	56
Poetry + Plays	223	231	239	186
Musick	18	42	89	42
Maps + Plates	94	139	35	61
Law	81	75	44	39
Libri Latini + François	206	194	219	186
Miscellanies	726	900	780	626
Reprinted	1074	1009	1186	1152
Total	3699	4354	4526	4124
ESTC totals (compared)	13235 (27.9%)	20687 (21.0%)	19837 (22.8%)	22757 (18.1%)

A comparison with modern ESTC data proves that the Term Catalogues remained highly selective. The ESTC lists between more than 13,000 and almost 23,000 titles for the individual decades. The Term Catalogue numbers range at 20%-30% of that. Catalogues of the 1690s had the greatest average numbers of titles, but ESTC data imply that the 1690s actually saw a slight drop in total title numbers. The distortions are partly the result of the project's instability in 1708 and 1709. They reflect, in part, the continuous neglect of ephemeral publications such as short political pamphlets.

The series ended in 1708 and 1709 with double editions. The remaining catalogue for Easter 1711 began with a new number 1 issue, and remains remarkable with its attempt to establish a new structure. The long category of reprinted books was split and brought under the respective headings of the new major categories: 1) Divinity, 2) History & Politicks, 3) Mathematical Sciences, 4) Physick & Natural Philosophy, 5) Philology, and 6) Poetry. The new arrangement confirmed the position of the two categories of religious and political publications. "History and Politikcs" stresses the interest in ongoing—religio-political—debates. 1711 is still marked by the Sacheverell affair.

Category	Titles	Percentage
[DIVINITY.]	71	37%
REPRINTED.	24	13%
HISTORY AND POLITICKS.	35	18%
REPRINTED.	3	2%
MATHEMATICAL SCIENCES.	11	6%
REPRINTED.	4	2%
PHYSICAL AND NATURAL PHILOSOPHY.	4	2%
REPRINTED.	5	3%
PHILOLOGY.	4	2%
REPRINTED.	7	4%
POETRY.	3	2%
REPRINTED.	2	1%
MISCELLANIES.	18	9%
ADVERTISEMENT.	(1)
	191	100%

== Edition ==
- The Term Catalogues, 1668–1709, With a Number for Easter Term, 1711 A.D. A Contemporary Bibliography of English Literature in the Reigns of Charles II, James II, William and Mary, and Anne. Ed. by Edward Arber, vols. 1–3. London: 1903/ 1905/ 1906.

- Scan of volume 1, 1668-1682 https://archive.org/

== Literature ==
- Cyprian Bladgen, "The Genesis of the Term Catalogues," The Library. s5-VIII(1) (1953). p. 30-35.
- Peter Düsterdieck, "Buchproduktion im siebzehnten Jahrhunder. Eine Analyse der Messkataloge für die Jahre 1637 und 1658," Archiv für Geschichte des Buchwesens, vol. 14. Lfg.2 (Frankfurt am Main: Buchhändler-Vereinigung, 1973) p. 163-219.
- Peter Düsterdieck, "Buchproduktion im 17. Jahrhundert. eine Analyse der Meßkataloge für die Jahre 1637 und 1658," Archiv für Geschichte des Buchwesens, vol. 14 (Berlin: de Gruyter, 1974), p. 163-220. ISSN 0066-6327, ZDB-ID 280214-4
- Peter Lindenbaum. "Authors and Publishers in the Late Seventeenth Century: New Evidence on their Relations," The Library. s6-17 (3) (1995) p. 250-269.
- Olaf Simons, Marteaus Europa oder Der Roman, bevor er Literatur wurde (Amsterdam/ Atlanta: Rodopi, 2001), p. 36-50 and 61–65.
- Oliver Duntze, "Die Frankfurter und Leipziger Meßkataloge als buchgeschichtliche Quellen", in Börsenblatt für den deutschen Buchhandel: Frankfurt am Main und Leipzig, ed. Börsenverein des Deutschen Buchhandels e.V., vol. 169 (Frankfurt, M.: Verl. Buchhändler-Vereinigung, 2002). ISSN 0340-7373, ZDB-ID 124201-5.
- The Cambridge History of the Book in Britain vol. 4. 1557-1695 ed. John Barnard and D. F. McKenzie (Cambridge: UP, 2002). ISBN 0-521-66182-X
- Stephan Füssel/ Helmut Hiller, Wörterbuch des Buches, vol. 7 (Frankfurt: Vittorio Klostermann, 2006). ISBN 978-3-465-03495-7
