= Moral Weekly =

Enlightenment periodical publications

Moral weeklies are a kind of periodical publications circulated in the first half of the 18th century. They dominated the contemporary press market and contributed significantly to spread the ideas of Enlightenment. Their main purpose were ethical considerations rather than news. Famous among the about 200 titles in English are Tatler (1709 journal), The Spectator (1711), The Guardian (1713).

== Bibliography ==
- Doms, Misia Sophia / Walcher Bernhard (eds.): Periodische Erziehung des Menschengeschlechts. Moralische Wochenschriften im deutschsprachigen Raum. Frankfurt am Main et al. 2012.
- Doms, Misia / Pascal Chave et al.: Database of German moral weeklies
- Ertler, Klaus-Dieter: Moral Weeklies (Periodical Essays), in: European History Online (EGO), published by the Leibniz Institute of European History (IEG), Mainz 2012-06-28. URL: URN: urn:nbn:de:0159-2012062800.
