= Michel de La Roche =

Michel de La Roche (also Michael) (fl. 1710–1742) was a French Huguenot refugee and author in England, where he was known as an editor of early literary periodicals, monthly or quarterly.

== Life ==
While young in France he experienced religious persecution for his Protestant religion. He left for England, where he became almost immediately an Anglican. He became a friend of Samuel Clarke, Benjamin Hoadly and William Whiston.

De La Roche settled in London and obtained employment from booksellers, mainly devoting himself to literary criticism. Imitating some similar ventures that had been made in Holland, he began in 1710 to issue a periodical, Memoirs of Literature. It was brought to an end in September 1714; there were other issues in 1717. De La Roche, on his own account, was a friend of Pierre Bayle. Early in 1717 he arranged to edit a new periodical, Bibliothèque Angloise, ou Histoire littéraire de la Grande Bretagne, in French and published at Amsterdam; he was still living for the most part in London. The fifth volume of the Bibliothèque Angloise, dated 1719, was the last he edited. The publisher transferred the editorship in that year to Armand de La Chapelle, giving as a pretext that de La Roche's foreign readers accused him of opposition to Calvinism, hostility to the Protestant Reformation, and a bias towards Anglicanism.

Shortly afterwards de La Roche began to edit the Mémoires Littéraires, which was published at The Hague at intervals till 1724. In 1725 he started New Memoirs of Literature, which ran till December 1727, and finally, in 1730, A Literary Journal, or a continuation of the Memoirs of Literature, which came to an end in 1731.
