= Presidents of Leipzig University =

This is a list of presidents of Leipzig University.

== 15th century ==
=== 1409–1419 ===
No.	Name	Year	Semester	Comment
1	Johannes Otto von Münsterberg	1409	Winter Semester (WS)	
2	Helmold Glaedenstedt	1410	Summer Semester (SS)	
3	Vinzent Grüner	1410	WS	
4	Burchard Tüntzmann	1411	SS	
5	Laurentius von Heilsberg	1411	WS	
6	Jakob Rodewitz	1412	SS	
7	Henning Boltenhagen	1412	WS	
8	Johann Hoffmann von Schweidnitz	1413	SS	
9	Petrus Storch	1413	WS	
10	Petrus Wegun	1414	SS	
11	Hermann Daum	1414	WS	
12	Johannes Zach	1415	SS	
13	Nikolaus Hüter	1415	WS	
14	Lubbertus Starten	1416	SS	
15	Helmold Glaedenstedt	1416	WS	
16	Matthias von Haynau	1417	SS	
17	Hermann von Torgau	1417	WS	
18	Johannes Hamme	1418	SS	
19	Johannes de Hallen	1418	WS	
20	Günther von Wiesa	1419	SS	
21	Jakob Rodewitz	1419	WS	

=== 1420–1439 ===
No.	Name	Year	Semester	Comment
22	Henning von Hildesheim	1420	SS	
23	Andreas von Weissenstadt	1420	WS	
24	Nikolaus von Liegnitz	1421	SS	
25	Johannes Löbeke	1421	WS	
26	Johannes Schipmann	1422	SS	
27	Volquin von Aachen	1422	WS	
28	Timotheus von Mergenow	1423	SS	
29	Georg Nebildaw	1423	WS	
30	Nikolaus Schulteti	1424	SS	
31	Johannes Weicker	1424	WS	
32	Andreas von Gersdorf	1425	SS	
33	Michael von Cottbus	1425	WS	
34	Conrad Donekorff	1426	SS	
35	Friedrich Smydel	1426	WS	
36	Nikolaus Weigel	1427	SS	
37	Augustin Bürnchin	1427	WS	
38	Hermann Wulko	1428	SS	
39	Johannes Törtsch	1428	WS	
40	Johannes Zach	1429	SS	
41	Johannes Grosse	1429	WS	
42	Johannes Landschreiber	1430	SS	
43	Jakob Meseberg	1430	WS	
44	Johannes Tornow	1431	SS	
45	Bernhard Rosenau	1431	WS	
46	Rucker von Lauterburg	1432	SS	
47	Arnold Westphal	1432	WS	
48	Stephan Hüfner	1433	SS	
49	Andreas Ruperti	1433	WS	
50	Burchard Plotze	1434	SS	
51	Heinrich Imhof	1434	WS	
52	Martin Spremberg	1435	SS	
53	Peter Pirner	1435	WS	
54	Arnold Westphal	1436	SS	
55	Heinrich Lür	1436	WS	
56	Johannes Ermelreich	1437	SS	
57	Johannes Wünschelburg	1437	WS	
58	Christopf von Stockholm	1438	SS	
59	Hermann von Heldburg	1438	WS	
60	Dietrich von Bocksdorf	1439	SS	
61	Jacob Schulteti	1439	WS	

=== 1440–1459 ===
No.	Name	Year	Semester	Comment
62	Johannes Weicker	1440	SS	
63	Johannes von Brieg	1440	WS	
64	Johannes Schimmelpfennig	1441	SS	
65	Nikolaus Garden	1441	WS	
66	Pelegrin von Goch	1442	SS	
67	Kasper Weigel	1442	WS	
68	Johannes Wiese	1443	SS	
69	Johannes von Weida	1443	WS	
70	Heinrich Steinbach	1444	SS	
71	Johannes Schwoffheim	1444	WS	
72	Johannes Salista	1445	SS	
73	Konrad Thüne	1445	WS	
74	Konrad Deinhard	1446	SS	
75	Franz Kurtz	1446	WS	
76	Johannes Swisiko	1447	SS	
77	Peter Prischwitz	1447	WS	
78	Johannes Breitrucke	1448	SS	
79	Andreas Wagner	1448	WS	
80	Heinrich Kohlhoff	1449	SS	
81	Nikolaus Tronitz	1449	WS	
82	Johannes Murmann	1450	SS	
83	Georg Steinbrecher	1450	WS	
84	Peter Manschein	1451	SS	
85	Andreas Rudiger	1451	WS	
86	Johannes Heberer	1452	SS	
87	Johannes Bresslauer	1452	WS	
88	Nikolaus Smilow	1453	SS	
89	Thimo Passer	1453	WS	
90	Konrad Flurherr	1454	SS	
91	Nikolaus Gerstmann	1454	WS	
92	Heinrich Elling	1455	SS	
93	Peter Seehausen	1455	WS	
94	Johannes Schwertmann	1456	SS	
95	Nikolaus Meltzer	1456	WS	
96	Hermann Steinberg	1457	SS	
97	Johannes Taymuth	1457	WS	
98	Johannes Scheurelin	1458	SS	
99	Christoph Thyme	1458	WS	
100	Heinrich Kolk	1459	SS	
101	Johannes Gedaw	1459	WS	

=== 1460–1479 ===
Nr.	Name	Jahr	Semester
102	Heinrich Pernold	1460	SS
103	Christoph Thyme	1460	WS
104	Heinrich Kolk	1461	SS
105	Johannes Meise gen. Eutritzsch	1461	WS
106	Johannes Stublinger	1462	SS
107	Hieronymus Schwoffheim	1462	WS
108	Johannes Evernhusen	1463	SS
109	Dionxsius Flegk	1463	WS
110	Johannes Fabri	1464	SS
111	Thomas Werner	1464	WS
112	Johannes Hasenfelt	1465	SS
113	Dietrich von Schönberg	1465	WS
114	Johannes Heroit	1466	SS
115	Thomas Hertel	1466	WS
116	Thomas Laram	1467	SS
117	Stephan Fortune	1467	WS
118	Johannes Permeter	1468	SS
119	Stanislaus Poehmann	1468	WS
120	Richard Karstens	1469	SS
121	Nicolaus Grobitzsch	1469	WS
122	Johannes Spiess	1470	SS
123	Johannes Fabri (Krossen)	1470	WS
124	Christian von Dietmarschen	1471	SS
125	Nikolaus Ghyr	1471	WS
126	Johannes Fabri (Forchheim)	1472	SS
127	Christoph Thyme	1472	WS
128	Andreas Dehne	1473	SS
129	Leonhard Meseberg	1473	WS
130	Johannes Tolhopf	1474	SS
131	Johannes Kleine	1474	WS
132	Adolf II. von Anhalt-Köthen	1475	SS
133	Peter Hofmann	1475	WS
134	Lambert von dem Hoeff	1476	SS
135	Georg Voigt	1476	WS
136	Johannes Lintz	1477	SS
137	Christoph Eckel	1477	WS
138	Johannes von Rothenburg	1478	SS
139	Johannes Wilhelmi	1478	WS
140	Johannes Lireke	1479	SS
141	Johannes Herold	1479	WS

=== 1480–1499 ===
Nr.	Name	Jahr	Semester
142	Johannes Kappentanz	1480	SS
143	Martin Fuhrmann	1480	WS
144	Jakob Gißlonis	1481	SS
145	Johannes Thümmel	1481	WS
146	Andreas Frisner	1482	SS
147	Martin Furmann	1482	WS
148	Peter Herren	1483	SS
149	Johannes Burborger	1483	WS
150	Bartholomäus Hammer	1484	SS
151	Christoph Bircke	1484	WS
152	Heinrich Greffe	1485	SS
153	Georg Weßennigk	1485	WS
154	Johannes Fabri (Donauwörth)	1486	SS
155	Georg Lessener	1486	WS
156	Erich von Schweden	1487	SS
157	Leonhard Pölner	1487	WS
158	Nicolaus Schreiter	1488	SS
159	Wenzeslaus Fabri	1488	SS
160	Mattheus Damerow	1489	WS
161	Johannes Reinhart	1489	SS
162	Heinrich Kolk	1490	WS
163	Melchior Ludwig	1490	SS
164	Martin Sporn	1491	WS
165	Wenzeslaus Judicis	1491	SS
166	Nikolaus Kleinschmidt	1492	WS
167	Christoph Tömrich	1492	SS
168	Pascha Alvesleben	1493	WS
169	Nikolaus Heiner	1493	SS
170	Konrad Wimpina	1494	WS
171	Matthias Frauendienst	1494	SS
172	Johannes Ruloff	1495	WS
173	Bernhard Thumirnicht	1495	SS
174	Georg Pertoltzfelder	1496	WS
175	Jodocus Bretzner	1496	SS
176	Johannes Bruckow	1497	WS
177	Johannes Peylick	1497	SS
178	Jodocus Engerer	1498	WS
179	Nikolaus Zeler	1498	SS
180	Magnus Hundt	1499	WS
181	Johannes Hennigk	1499	SS

== 16th century ==
=== 1500–1519 ===
Nr.	Name	Jahr	Semester
182	Georg Dottanius	1500	SS
183	Nikolaus Fabri (Grünberg)	1500	WS
184	Sebastian Zimmermann	1501	SS
185	Brandanus von Schöneich	1501	WS
186	Virgel Wellendorfer	1502	SS
187	Johannes Honorius	1502	WS
188	Peter Eisenberg	1503	SS
189	Michael Rau	1503	WS
190	Sigesmund Altmann	1504	SS
191	Stephan Gert	1504	WS
192	Heinrich Raleveshusen	1505	SS
193	Matthaeus Hennigk	1505	WS
194	Sixtus Pfeffer	1506	SS
195	Martin Meyendorn	1506	WS
196	Arnold Wöstefeldes	1507	SS
197	Ludwig Sartoris	1507	WS
198	Heinrich Stromer	1508	SS
199	Gregor Breitkopf	1508	WS
200	Thilo von Trotha	1509	SS
201	Paul Schwoffheim	1509	WS
202	Hieronymus Dungersheim	1510	SS
203	Peter Wirth (Löwenberg)	1510	WS
204	Johannes Sperber	1511	SS
205	Paul Schiller	1511	WS
206	Konrad Tockler	1512	SS
207	Sebastian von der Heide	1512	WS
208	Godehard Lüderi	1513	SS
209	Andreas Propst	1513	WS
210	Nikolaus Apel	1514	SS
211	Wolfgang Schindler	1514	WS
212	Johannes Rogge	1515	SS
213	Johannes Koel	1515	WS
214	Alexander Sockler	1516	SS
215	Johannes Langer	1516	WS
216	Paul Dhym	1517	SS
217	Franz Richter (Hainichen)	1517	WS
218	Simon Eissemann	1518	SS
219	Johannes Lange	1518	WS
220	Arnold Wöstenfeldes	1519	SS
221	Andreas Probst	1519	WS

=== 1520–1539 ===
Nr.	Name	Jahr	Semester
222	Petrus Mosellanus	1520	SS
223	Christoph Hegendorf	1520	WS
224	Paul Dhym	1521	SS
225	Heinrich Eberhausen	1521	WS
226	Nikolaus Apel	1522	SS
227	Andreas Franck	1522	WS
228	Petrus Mosellanus	1523	SS
229	Christoph Hegendorf	1523	WS
230	Johannes Reusch	1524	SS
231	Paul Schwoffheim	1524	WS
232	Henning Pyrgallus	1525	SS
233	Casper Barth	1525	WS
234	Paul Fetzer	1526	SS
235	Johannes Weiss	1526	WS
236	Johannes Steinhoff	1527	SS
237	Petrus Scorler	1527	WS
238	Johannes Sauer	1528	SS
239	Ludwig Sartoris	1528	WS
240	Georg von Soda	1529	SS
241	Johannes Pfeil	1529	WS
242	Johannes Musler	1530	SS
243	Martin Titz	1530	WS
244	Johannes Stramburg	1531	SS
245	Johannes Fritzsch	1531	WS
246	Gottfried Sybott	1532	SS
247	Petrus Brockendorf	1532	WS
248	Arnold Wöstenfels	1533	SS
249	Paul Lobwasser	1533	WS
250	Friedrich Peypus	1534	SS
251	Valerius Pfister	1534	WS
252	Heinrich Gottschalk	1535	SS
253	Erhard Neupar	1535	WS
254	Ulrich Steudler	1536	SS
255	Christoph Montag	1536	WS
256	Christian Pistorius	1537	SS
257	Leonhard Badehorn	1537	WS
258	Gottfried Sybott	1538	SS
259	Christoph Montag	1538	WS
260	Christian Pistorius	1539	SS
261	Caspar Borner	1539	WS

=== 1540–1559 ===
No.	Name	Year	Semester	Comment
262	Ulrich Steudler	1540	SS	
263	Georg Czeler	1540	WS	
264	Henning Pyrgallus	1541	SS	
265	Caspar Borner	1541	WS	
266	Johannes Sauer	1542	SS	
267	Christoph Watzek	1542	WS	
268	Paul Bussinus	1543	SS	
269	Caspar Borner	1543	WS	
270	Joachim Camerarius der Ältere	1544	SS	
271	Georg Czeler	1544	WS	
272	Joachim von Kneitlingen	1545	SS	
273	Leonhard Badehorn	1545	WS	
274	Joachim Camerarius der Ältere	1546	SS	
275	Konstantin Pflügler	1546	WS	
276	Paul Bussinus	1547	SS	
277	Wolfgang Meurer	1547	WS	
278	Johannes Sinappius	1548	SS	
279	Donatus Zöllner	1548	WS	
280	Joachim von Kneitlingen	1549	SS	
281	Blasius Thammüller	1549	WS	
282	Heinrich Salmuth	1550	SS	
283	Peter Thomäus	1550	WS	
284	Heinrich Cordes	1551	SS	
285	Caspar Landsidel	1551	WS	
286	Johannes Hommel	1552	SS	
287	Georg Czeler	1552	WS	
288	Bartolus Richius	1553	SS	
289	Maximus Geritz	1553	WS	
290	Johannes Meyer	1554	SS	
291	Franz Kram	1554	WS	
292	Alexander Alesius	1555	SS	
293	Aegidius Morch	1555	WS	
294	Andreas Knauer	1556	SS	
295	Siegesmund Prüfer	1556	WS	
296	Ernst Bock	1557	SS	
297	Hieronymus Zynaus	1557	WS	
298	Joachim Camerarius the elder	1558	SS	
299	Andreas Freyhub	1558	WS	
300	Anton Glining	1559	SS	
301	Peter Helborn	1559	WS	

=== 1560–1579 ===
No.	Name	Year	Semester	Comment
302	Johannes Hommel	1560	SS	
303	Franz Kram	1560	WS	
304	Alexander Alesius	1561	SS	
305	Andreas Morch	1561	WS	
306	Leonhard Lycius	1562	SS	
307	Andreas Freyhub	1562	WS	
308	Caspar Jungerman	1563	SS	
309	Andreas Ellinger	1563	WS	
310	Victorin Strigel	1564	SS	
311	Franz Kram	1564	WS	
312	Georg Costius	1565	SS	
313	Simon Scheibe	1565	WS	
314	Georg Masbach	1566	SS	
315	Balthasar Gütler	1566	WS	
316	Johann Cramer	1567	SS	
317	Maximus Geritz	1567	WS	
318	Leonhard Lycius	1568	SS	
319	Erasmus Kirstein	1568	WS	
320	Anton Glining	1569	SS	
321	Simon Scheibe	1569	WS	
322	Johann Stromer	1570	SS	
323	Andreas Freyhub	1570	WS	
324	Caspar Jungerman	1571	SS	
325	Amandus Pfister	1571	WS	
326	Georg Masbach	1572	SS	
327	Balthasar Gütler	1572	WS	
328	Georg Costius	1573	SS	
329	Zacharias Schilter	1573	WS	
330	Georg Masbach	1574	SS	
331	Michael Wirth	1574	WS	
332	Caspar Jungerman	1575	SS	
333	Michael Barth	157	WS	
334	Johann Albinus	1576	SS	
335	Michael Mascus	1576	WS	
336	Anton Glining	1577	SS	
337	Zacharias Schilter	1577	WS	
338	Andreas Scheffer	1578	SS	
339	Michael Wirth	1578	WS	
340	Caspar Jungerman	1579	SS	
341	Simon Scheibe	1579	WS	

=== 1580–1599 ===
No.	Name	Year	Semester	Comment
342	Johann Albinus	1580	SS	
343	Jacob Blümel	1580	WS	
344	Caspar Jungerman	1581	SS	
345	Balthasar Schelhammer	1581	WS	
346	Andreas Scheffer	1582	SS	
347	Michael Mascus	1582	WS	
348	Johannes Cramer	1583	SS	
349	Michael Barth	1583	WS	
350	Johann Albinus	1584	SS	
351	Jacob Blümel	1584	WS	
352	Franz Romanus (1550–1636)	1585	SS	
353	Abraham Fabri	1585	WS	
354	Andreas Scheffer	1586	SS	
355	Hieronymus Günther	1586	WS	
356	Caspar Jungerman	1587	SS	
357	Sigismund Badehorn	1587	WS	
358	Johann Albinus	1588	SS	
359	Balthasar Gütler	1588	WS	
360	Georg Walther	1589	SS	
361	Zacharias Schilter	1589	WS	
362	Johannes Oettwein	1590	SS	
363	Burchard Harbart	1590	WS	
364	Casper Jungerman	1591	SS	
365	Christoph Meurer	1591	WS	
366	Andreas Hommel	1592	SS	
367	Michael Wirth	1592	WS	
368	Joachim Tancke	1593	SS	
369	Johann Münch	1593	WS	
370	Johann Albinus	1594	SS	
371	Johannes Neldel	1594	WS	
372	Ulrich of Denmark	1595	SS	
373	Elias Heidenreich	1595	WS	
374	Johannes Friderich	1596	SS	
375	Jacob Blümel	1596	WS	
376	Johannes Curtius	1597	SS	
377	Bartholomäus Gölnitz	1597	WS	
378	Wolfgang Corvinus	1598	SS	
379	Balthasar Gütler	1598	WS	
380	Joachim Tanck	1599	SS	
381	Matthäus Dresser	1599	WS	

== 17th century ==
=== 1600–1619 ===
No.	Name	Year	Semester	Comment
382	Andreas Doerer	1600	SS	
383	Georg Weinrich	1600	WS	
384	Franz Romanus	1601	SS	
385	Johannes Mayer	1601	WS	
386	Philipp Julius von Pommern	1602	SS	
387	Burchard Harbart	1602	WS	
388	Johannes Curtius	1603	SS	
389	Zacharias Schilter	1603	WS	
390	Johannes Friderich	1604	SS	
391	Adolf Friedrich von Mecklenburg	1604	WS	
392	Gabriel Tincelius	1605	SS	
393	Wolfgang Mayer	1605	WS	
394	Wilhelm Schmuck	1606	SS	
395	Andreas Emmenius	1606	WS	
396	Franz Romanus	1607	SS	
397	Christoph Bruno	1607	WS	
398	Wolfgang Corvinus	1608	SS	
399	Georg Feige	1608	WS	
400	Otto Schwalenberg	1609	SS	
401	Christoph Meurer	1609	WS	
402	Johannes Leonhard Agricola	1610	SS	
403	Johannes Neldel	1610	WS	
404	Konrad Bavarus	1611	SS	
405	Bartholomaeus Gölnitz	1611	WS	
406	Wilhelm Schmuck	1612	SS	
407	Johann Philipp von Sachsen-Altenburg	1612	WS	
408	Johann Philipp von Sachsen-Altenburg	1613	SS	
409	Johann Philipp von Sachsen-Altenburg	1613	WS	
410	Johann Philipp von Sachsen-Altenburg	1614	SS	
411	Sigismund Schilling	1614	WS	
412	Johannes Curtius	1615	SS	
413	Sigismund Finckelthaus	1615	WS	
414	Johannes Friderich	1616	SS	
415	Michael Wirth	1616	WS	
416	Polykarp Leyser II.	1617	SS	
417	Samuel Mosbach	1617	WS	
418	Johannes Leonhard Agricola	1618	SS	
419	Georg Ernst von Schönburg	1618	WS	
420	Georg Ernst von Schönburg	1619	SS	
421	Christoph Walpurger	1619	WS	

=== 1620–1639 ===
No.	Name	Year	Semester	Comment
422	Vincentius Schmuck	1620	SS	
423	Sigismund Schilling	1620	WS	
424	Franz Romanus	1621	SS	
425	Heinrich Höpfner	1621	WS	
426	Thomas Heckel	1622	SS	
427	Nicolaus Lisca	1622	WS	
428	Jacob von Kurland und Semgallen; Philipp Müller	1623	SS	
429	Jacob von Kurland und Semgallen; Sigismund Finckelthaus	1623	WS	
430	Wilhelm Schmuck	1624	SS	
431	Daniel Putscher	1624	WS	
432	Polykarp Leyser II.	1625	SS	
433	Johann Günther	1625	WS	
434	Johann Rupert Sultzberger	1626	SS	
435	Johannes Heintz	1626	WS	
436	Johannes Behm	1627	SS	
437	Franz Kest	1627	WS	
438	Wilhelm Schmuck	1628	SS	
439	Johann Zeidler	1628	WS	
440	Janusz Radziwiłł	1629	SS	
441	Enoch Heiland	1629	WS	
442	Andreas Corvinus	1630	SS	
443	Christoph Preibisius	1630	WS	
444	Johannes Behm	1631	SS	
445	Johann Höpner	1631	WS	
446	Georg Tobias Schwendendörffer	1632	SS	
447	Daniel Putscher	1632	WS	
448	Philipp Müller	1633	SS	
449	Christian Lange	1634	WS	
450	Andreas Corvinus oder Andreas Rabe	1634	SS	
451	Johannes Heintz	1634	WS	
452	Konrad Bavarus	1635	SS	
453	Samuel Mosbach	1635	WS	
454	Georg Tobias Schwendendörffer	1636	SS	
455	Johann Zeidler	1636	WS	
456	Johannes Michaelis	1637	SS	
457	Enoch Heiland	1637	WS	
458	Andreas Corvinus	1638	SS	
459	Johannes Heintz	1638	WS	
460	Andreas Rivinus	1639	SS	
461	Caspar Michael Welsch	1639	WS	

=== 1640–1659 ===
No.	Name	Year	Semester	Comment
462	Georg Tobias Schwendendörffer	1640	SS	
463	Johann Zeidler	1640	WS	
464	Johannes Michaelis	1641	SS	
465	Heinrich X, Count of Reuss-Ebersdorf	1641	WS	
466	Heinrich X, Count of Reuss-Ebersdorf	1642	SS	
467	Heinrich X, Count of Reuss-Ebersdorf	1642	WS	
468	Johannes Michaelis	1643	SS	
469	Franz Romanus	1643	WS	
470	Georg Tobias Schwendendörffer	1644	SS	
471	Johannes Hoppe	1644	WS	
472	Andreas Rivinus	1645	SS	
473	Quirinus Schacher	1645	WS	
474	Georg Tobias Schwendendörffer	1646	SS	
475	Johannes Hoppe	1646	WS	
476	Johann Hülsemann	1647	SS	
477	Samuel Mosbach	1647	WS	
478	Johannes Ittig	1648	SS	
479	Johannes Hoppe	1648	WS	
480	Gottfried Schlüter	1649	SS	
481	Johann Born	1649	WS	
482	Georg Tobias Schwendendörffer	1650	SS	
483	Christoph Preibisius	1650	WS	
484	Johannes Michaelis	1651	SS	
485	Daniel Heinrici	1651	WS	
486	Johannes Ittig	1652	SS	
487	Johann Philippi	1652	WS	
488	Johann Hülsemann	1653	SS	
489	Hieronymus Kromayer	1653	WS	
490	Leonhard Ursinus	1654	SS	
491	Johannes Preibisius	1654	WS	
492	Johannes Michaelis	1655	SS	
493	Christian Lange	1655	WS	
494	Georg Tobias Schwendendörffer	1656	SS	
495	David Schwertner	1656	WS	
496	Gottfried Schlüter	1657	SS	
497	Paul Wagner	1657	WS	
498	Leonhard Behr oder Leonhard Ursinus	1658	SS	
499	Johannes Preibisius	1658	WS	
500	Johannes Preibisius	1659	SS	
501	Johannes Michaelis	1659	WS	

=== 1660–1679 ===
No.	Name	Year	Semester	Comment
502	Johannes Ittig	1660	SS	
503	Johann Adam Schertzer	1660	WS	
504	Heinrich Andreas Mengering	1661	SS	
505	Christian Friedrich Franckenstein	1661	WS	
506	Johannes Ittig	1662	SS	
507	David Schwertner	1662	WS	
508	Johannes Michaelis	1663	SS	
509	Samuel Lange	1663	WS	
510	Amadeus Eckolt	1664	SS	
511	Johann Adam Schertzer	1664	WS	
512	Johann Ernst Noricus	1665	SS	
513	Gottfried Welsch	1665	WS	
514	Johannes Ittig	1666	SS	
515	Valentin Alberti	1666	WS	
516	Elias Siegesmund Reinhard	1667	SS	
517	Friedrich Rappolt	1667	WS	
518	Nicolaus Creusel	1668	SS	
519	Paul Amman	1668	WS	
520	Johannes Olearius	1669	SS	
521	Jakob Thomasius	1669	WS	
522	Johannes Ittig	1670	SS	
523	Johann Adam Schertzer	1670	WS	
524	Johannes Olearius	1671	SS	
525	Paul Franz Romanus	1671	WS	
526	Georg Tobias Schwendendörffer	1672	SS	
527	Valentin Alberti	1672	WS	
528	Anton Günther Heshusius	1673	SS	
529	August Benedict Carpzov	1673	WS	
530	Nicolaus Creusel	1674	SS	
531	Friedrich Geißler	1674	WS	
532	Otto Mencke	1675	SS	
533	Friedrich Rappolt	1675	WS	
534	Christoph Pfautz	1676	SS	
535	Valentin Alberti	1676	WS	
536	Johannes Olearius	1677	SS	
537	Michael Heinrich Horn	1677	WS	
538	Christoph Pfautz	1678	SS	
539	Gottfried Schilter	1678	WS	
540	Otto Mencke	1679	SS	
541	Johann Benedict Carpzov	1679	WS	

=== 1680–1699 ===
No.	Name	Year	Semester	Comment
542	Joachim Feller	1680	SS	
543	Valentin Alberti	1680	WS	
544	Georg Heintz	1681	SS	
545	Adam Rechenberg	1681	WS	
546	Christoph Pfautz	1682	SS	
547	Johannes Cyprian	1682	WS	
548	Johannes Olearius	1683	SS	
549	Andreas Mylius	1683	WS	
550	Joachim Feller	1684	SS	
551	Paul Ammann	1684	WS	
552	Anton Günther Heshusius	1685	SS	
553	Gottfried Nikolaus Ittig	1685	WS	
554	Christoph Pfautz	1686	SS	
555	Valentin Alberti	1686	WS	
556	Otto Mencke	1687	SS	
557	Martin Friedrich Friese	1687	WS	
558	Joachim Feller	1688	SS	
559	Johann Schmid	1688	WS	
560	Johannes Olearius	1689	SS	
561	Adam Rechenberg	1689	WS	
562	Christoph Pfautz	1690	SS	
563	Johannes Cyprian	1690	WS	
564	Anton Günther Heshusius	1691	SS	
565	Johann Benedict Carpzov	1691	WS	
566	Christoph Pfautz	1692	SS	
567	Valentin Alberti	1692	WS	
568	Otto Mencke	1693	SS	
569	Johannes Bohn	1693	WS	
570	Christoph Pfautz	1694	SS	
571	Johann Schmid	1694	WS	
572	Johannes Olearius	1695	SS	
573	Andreas Mylius	1695	WS	
574	Christoph Pfautz	1696	SS	
575	Johannes Cyprian	1696	WS	
576	Anton Günther Heshusius	1697	SS	
577	Johann Benedict Carpzov	1697	WS	
578	Christoph Pfautz	1698	SS	
579	Johann Schmid	1698	WS	
580	Otto Mencke	1699	SS	
581	August Quirinus Rivinus	1699	WS	

== 18th century ==
=== 1700–1719 ===
No.	Name	Year	Semester	Comment
582	Valentin Friderici	1700	SS	
583	Gottlob Friedrich Seligmann	1700	WS	
584	Johann Gottlieb Hardt	1701	SS	
585	Gottfried Olearius	1701	WS	
586	Johann Christian Schamberg	1702	SS	
587	Johannes Cyprian	1702	WS	
588	Johannes Olearius	1703	SS	
589	Johann Christoph Schacher	1703	WS	
590	Christoph Pfautz	1704	SS	
591	Johann Schmid	1704	WS	
592	Johannes Olearius	1705	SS	
593	Gottfried Nikolaus Ittig	1705	WS	
594	Johann Christian Schamberg	1706	SS	
595	Gottlob Friedrich Seligmann	1706	WS	
596	Lüder Mencke	1707	SS	
597	Johann Burckhardt Mencke	1707	WS	
598	Christoph Pfautz	1708	SS	
599	Johannes Cyprian	1708	WS	
600	Johann Gottlieb Hardt	1709	SS	
601	August Quirinus Rivinus	1709	WS	
602	Christian Friedrich Börner	1710	SS	
603	Johann Schmid	1710	WS	
604	Lüder Mencke	1711	SS	
605	Johann Georg Abicht	1711	WS	
606	Ulrich Junius	1712	SS	
607	Johannes Cyprian	1712	WS	
608	Johann Gottlieb Hardt	1713	SS	
609	Gottlieb Gerhard Titius	1713	WS	
610	Christian Friedrich Börner	1714	SS	
611	Johann Schmid	1714	WS	
612	Johann Burckhardt Mencke	1715	SS	
613	Gottlob Friedrich Jenichen	1715	WS	
614	Ulrich Junius	1716	SS	
615	Johann Christian Lehmann	1716	WS	
616	Johann Burckhardt Mencke	1717	SS	
617	Karl Otto Rechenberg	1717	WS	
618	Christian Friedrich Börner	1718	SS	
619	Johannes Cyprian	1718	WS	
620	Johann Burckhardt Mencke	1719	SS	
621	Polycarp Gottlieb Schacher	1719	WS	

=== 1720–1739 ===
No.	Name	Year	Semester	Comment
622	Ulrich Junius	1720	SS	
623	Johann Schmid	1720	WS	
624	Heinrich Klausing	1721	SS	
625	Johann Friedrich Olearius	1721	WS	
626	Ulrich Junius	1722	SS	
627	Christian Gottfried Hoffmann	1722	WS	
628	Johann Burckhardt Mencke	1723	SS	
629	Michael Ernst Ettmüller	1723	WS	
630	Christian Friedrich Börner	1724	SS	
631	Christian Ludovici	1724	WS	
632	Augustin Friedrich Walther	1725	SS	
633	Gottlob Friedrich Jenichen	1725	WS	
634	Christian Friedrich Börner	1726	SS	
635	Johann Christian Lehmann	1726	WS	
636	Heinrich Klausing	1727	SS	
637	Johann Zacharias Platner	1727	WS	
638	Christian Friedrich Börner	1728	SS	
639	Johann Schmid	1728	WS	
640	Johann Burckhardt Mencke	1729	SS	
641	Johann Florenz Rivinus	1729	WS	
642	Karl Wilhelm Gärtner	1730	SS	
643	Christian Ludovici	1730	WS	
644	Heinrich Klausing	1731	SS	
645	Christian August Hausen der Jüngere	1731	WS	
646	Christian Friedrich Börner	1732	SS	
647	Johann Christian Lehmann	1732	WS	
648	Heinrich Klausing	1733	SS	
649	August Friedrich Müller	1733	WS	
650	Johann Erhard Kapp	1734	SS	
651	Johann Christian Lehmann	1734	WS	
652	Friedrich Menz	1735	SS	
653	Johann Florenz Rivinus	1735	WS	
654	Christian Friedrich Börner	1736	SS	
655	Gottfried Leonhard Baudis der Ältere	1736	WS	
656	Augustin Friedrich Walther	1737	SS	
657	Christian Gottlieb Jöcher	1737	WS	
658	Johann Erhard Kapp	1738	SS	
659	Johann Christoph Gottsched	1738	WS	
660	Georg Friedrich Richter	1739	SS	
661	Ferdinand August Hommel	1739	WS	

=== 1740–1759 ===
No.	Name	Year	Semester	Comment
662	Johann Erhard Kapp	1740	SS	
663	Johann Christoph Gottsched	1740	WS	
664	Heinrich Klausing	1741	SS	
665	Christian Gottlieb Jöcher	1741	WS	
666	Christian Friedrich Börner	1742	SS	
667	Johann Christoph Gottsched	1742	WS	
668	Johann Friedrich Menz	1743	SS	
669	August Friedrich Müller	1743	WS	
670	Johann Friedrich Christ	1744	SS	
671	Johann Heinrich Winckler	1744	WS	
672	Heinrich Klausing	1745	SS	
673	Johann Christian Hebenstreit	1745	WS	
674	Johann Erhard Kapp	1746	SS	
675	Johann Friedrich May	1746	WS	
676	Johann Heinrich Winckler	1747	SS	
677	Christian Gottlieb Jöcher	1747	WS	
678	Johann Friedrich Christ	1748	SS	
679	Johann Christoph Gottsched	1748	WS	
680	Johann Heinrich Winckler	1749	SS	
681	Gottfried Heinsius	1749	WS	
682	Johann Erhard Kapp	1750	SS	
683	Christian Gottlieb Ludwig	1750	WS	
684	Johann Heinrich Winckler	1751	SS	
685	Johann Christian Hebenstreit	1751	WS	
686	Johann Friedrich Christ	1752	SS	
687	Johann Friedrich May	1752	WS	
688	Anton Wilhelm Plaz	1753	SS	
689	Johann Gottlieb Siegel	1753	WS	
690	Johann Erhard Kapp	1754	SS	
691	Christian Gottlieb Ludwig	1754	WS	
692	Johann Heinrich Winckler	1755	SS	
693	Christian August Crusius	1755	WS	
694	Johann Friedrich Christ	1756	SS	
695	Johann Christoph Gottsched	1756	WS	
696	Anton Wilhelm Plaz	1757	SS	
697	August Friedrich Müller	1757	WS	
698	Karl Andreas Bel	1758	SS	
699	Johann Friedrich May	1758	WS	
700	Johann Heinrich Winckler	1759	SS	
701	Karl Friedrich Hundertmark	1759	WS	

=== 1760–1779 ===
No.	Name	Year	Semester	Comment
702	Johann Gottlob Böhme	1760	SS	
703	Johann Friedrich Bahrdt	1760	WS	
704	Anton Wilhelm Plaz	1761	SS	
705	Johann August Ernesti	1761	WS	
706	Karl Andreas Bel	1762	SS	
707	Christian Gottlieb Ludwig	1762	WS	
708	Johann Heinrich Winckler	1763	SS	
709	Karl Ferdinand Hommel	1763	WS	
710	Johann Gottlob Böhme	1764	SS	
711	Johann Christoph Pohl	1764	WS	
712	Anton Wilhelm Plaz	1765	SS	
713	Carl Günther Ludovici	1765	WS	
714	Karl Andreas Bel	1766	SS	
715	Johann Friedrich Bahrdt	1766	WS	
716	Johann Heinrich Winckler	1767	SS	
717	Christian August Crusius	1767	WS	
718	Johann Gottlob Böhme	1768	SS	
719	Christian Gottlieb Ludwig	1768	WS	
720	Anton Wilhelm Plaz	1769	SS	
721	Johann August Ernesti	1769	WS	
722	Karl Andreas Bel	1770	SS	
723	Johann Christoph Pohl	1770	WS	
724	Anton Wilhelm Plaz	1771	SS	
725	Johann Gottlieb Seger	1771	WS	
726	Johann Gottlob Böhme	1772	SS	
727	Georg Heinrich Borz	1772	WS	
728	Heinrich Gottlieb Francke	1773	SS	
729	Ernst Gottlob Bose	1773	WS	
730	August Wilhelm Ernesti	1774	SS	
731	Samuel Friedrich Nathanael Morus	1774	WS	
732	Anton Wilhelm Plaz	1775	SS	
733	Josias Ludwig Ernst Püttmann	1775	WS	
734	Karl Andreas Bel	1776	SS	
735	Johann Friedrich Burscher	1776	WS	
736	Heinrich Gottlieb Francke	1777	SS	
737	Christian Gottlieb Seydlitz	1777	WS	
738	August Wilhelm Ernesti	1778	SS	
739	Johann Christoph Pohl	1778	WS	
740	Anton Wilhelm Plaz	1779	SS	
741	Friedrich Gottlieb Zoller	1779	WS	

=== 1780–1799 ===
No.	Name	Year	Semester	Comment
742	Karl Andreas Bel	1780	SS	
743	Georg Heinrich Borz	1780	WS	
744	Christian August Clodius	1781	SS	
745	Christlieb Benedict Funk	1781	WS	
746	August Wilhelm Ernesti	1782	SS	
747	Johann Friedrich Burscher	1782	WS	
748	Ernst Platner	1783	SS	
749	Carl Gottfried von Winkler	1783	WS	
750	Friedrich August Wilhelm Wenck	1784	SS	
751	Samuel Friedrich Nathanael Morus	1784	WS	
752	Friedrich Immanuel Schwarz	1785	SS	
753	Johann August Dathe	1785	WS	
754	Friedrich Wolfgang Reiz	1786	SS	
755	Georg Heinrich Borz	1786	WS	
756	Heinrich Gottfried Bauer	1787	SS	
757	Christian Friedrich Pezold	1787	WS	
758	Johann Georg Eck	1788	SS	
759	Johann Friedrich Burscher	1788	WS	
760	Ernst Platner	1789	SS	
761	Johann Gottlob Haase	1789	WS	
762	August Friedrich Schott	1790	SS	
763	Johann Karl Gehler	1790	WS	
764	Christian Daniel Beck	1791	SS	
765	Carl Friedrich Hindenburg	1791	WS	
766	Friedrich August Wilhelm Wenck	1792	SS	
767	Johann Friedrich Burscher	1792	WS	
768	Karl Adolph Caesar	1793	SS	
769	Ernst Wilhelm Hempel	1793	WS	
770	Johann Georg Eck	1794	SS	
771	Gottfried August Arndt	1794	WS	
772	Christian Daniel Beck	1795	SS	
773	Johann Gottlob Haase	1795	WS	
774	Friedrich August Wilhelm Wenck	1796	SS	
775	Johann Friedrich Burscher	1796	WS	
776	Gottlieb Immanuel Dindorf	1797	SS	
777	Christian Daniel Erhard	1797	WS	
778	Johann Georg Eck	1798	SS	
779	Johann Friedrich Burscher	1798	WS	
780	Karl Adolph Caesar	1799	SS	
781	Karl August Gottlieb Keil	1799	WS	

== 19th century ==
=== 1800–1819 ===
No.	Name	Year	Semester	Comment
782	Friedrich August Wilhelm Wenck	1800	SS	
783	Gottfried August Arndt	1800	WS	
784	Christian Daniel Beck	1801	SS	
785	Christian Friedrich Ludwig	1801	WS	
786	Johann Georg Eck	1802	SS	
787	Johann Friedrich Burscher	1802	WS	
788	Karl Adolph Caesar	1803	SS	
789	Karl August Gottlieb Keil	1803	WS	
790	Friedrich August Wilhelm Wenck	1804	SS	
791	Gottfried August Arndt	1804	WS	
792	Christian Daniel Beck	1805	SS	
793	Karl Gottlob Kühn	1805	WS	
794	Johann Georg Eck	1806	SS	
795	Christian Daniel Erhard	1806	WS	
796	Karl Adolph Caesar	1807	SS	
797	Christian Friedrich Ludwig	1807	WS	
798	Johann August Heinrich Tittmann	1808	SS	
799	Johann August Heinrich Tittmann	1808	WS	
800	Christian Daniel Beck	1809	SS	
801	Karl Gottlob Kühn	1809	WS	
802	Johann August Heinrich Tittmann	1810	SS	
803	Ernst Carl Wieland	1810	WS	
804	Christian Gottlieb Haubold	1811	SS	
805	Heinrich Gottlieb Tzschirner	1811	WS	
806	Johann August Heinrich Tittmann	1812	SS	
807	Ernst Carl Wieland	1812	WS	
808	Wilhelm Traugott Krug	1813	SS	
809	Karl Gottlob Kühn	1813	WS	
810	Johann August Heinrich Tittmann	1814	SS	
811	Ernst Carl Wieland	1814	WS	
812	Christian Daniel Beck	1815	SS	
813	Christian Ernst Weisse	1815	WS	
814	Johann Christian Rosenmüller	1816	SS	
815	Ernst Carl Wieland	1816	WS	
816	Christian Daniel Beck	1817	SS	
817	Christian Ernst Weisse	1817	WS	
818	Johann Christian Rosenmüller	1818	SS	
819	Johann Christian Rosenmüller	1818	WS	
820	Christian Gottlieb Haubold	1819	SS	
821	Gottfried Hermann	1819	WS	

=== 1820–1839 ===
No.	Name	Year	Semester	Comment
822	Johann August Heinrich Tittmann	1820	SS	
823	Johann Gottfried Müller	1820	WS	
824	Christian Daniel Beck	1821	SS	
825	Christian Ernst Weisse	1821	WS	
826	Johann August Heinrich Tittmann	1822	SS	
827	Johann Gottfried Müller	1822	WS	
828	Christian Daniel Beck	1823	SS	
829	Gottfried Hermann	1823	WS	
830	Wilhelm Andreas Haase	1824	SS	
831	Johann Gottfried Müller	1824	WS	
832	Christian Daniel Beck	1825	SS	
833	Christian Ernst Weisse	1825	WS	
834	Johann August Heinrich Tittmann	1826	SS	
835	Johann Gottfried Müller	1826	WS	
836	Christian Daniel Beck	1827	SS	
837	Christian Ernst Weisse	1827	WS	
838	Johann Gottfried Müller	1828	SS	
839	Johann Gottfried Müller	1828	WS	
840	Christian Daniel Beck	1829	SS	
841	Christian Daniel Beck	1829	WS	
842	Wilhelm Traugott Krug	1830	SS und WS	
843	Julius Friedrich Winzer	1831	SS	
844	Karl Klien	1831/32		
845	Wilhelm Andreas Haase	1832/33		
846	Heinrich Wilhelm Brandes	1833/34		
847	Wilhelm Wachsmuth	1834/35		
848	Carl Friedrich Günther	1835/36		
849	Friedrich Adolph Schilling	1836/37		
850	Wilhelm Ferdinand Steinacker	1837/38		
851	Ernst Heinrich Weber	1838/39		
852	Johann Christian August Clarus	1839/40		

=== 1840–1859 ===
No.	Name	Year	Comment
853	Moritz Wilhelm Drobisch	1840/41	
854	Georg Benedict Winer	1841/42	
855	Friedrich Adolph Schilling	1842/43	
856	Ernst Heinrich Weber	1843/44	
857	Carl Friedrich Günther	1844/45	
858	Ludwig von der Pfordten	1845/46	
859	Ludwig von der Pfordten	1846/47	
860	Gustav Hartenstein	1847/48	
861	Otto Linné Erdmann	1848/49	
862	Friedrich Bülau	1849/50	
863	Friedrich Bülau	1850/51	
864	Friedrich Adolph Schilling	1851/52	
865	Friedrich Adolph Schilling	1852/53	
866	Gustav Hänel	1853/54	
867	Otto Linné Erdmann	1854/55	
868	Otto Linné Erdmann	1855/56	
869	Johann Christian Friedrich Tuch	1856/57	
870	Johann Christian Friedrich Tuch	1857/58	
871	Karl Georg von Wächter	1858/59	
872	Karl Georg von Wächter	1859/60	

=== 1860–1879 ===
No.	Name	Year	Comment
873	Wilhelm Roscher	1860/61	
874	Wilhelm Gottlieb Hankel	1861/62	
875	Otto Linné Erdmann	1862/63	
876	Christian Georg Theodor Ruete	1863/64	
877	Karl Friedrich August Kahnis	1864/65	
878	Karl von Gerber	1865/66	
879	Karl von Gerber	1866/67	
880	Wilhelm Gottlieb Hankel	1867/68	
881	Bruno Brückner	1868/69	
882	Friedrich Zarncke	1869/70	
883	Friedrich Zarncke	1870/71	
884	Carl Reinhold August Wunderlich	1871/72	
885	Hermann Brockhaus	1872/73	
886	Adolph Schmidt	1873/74	
887	Gustav Adolf Ludwig Baur	1874/75	
888	Johannes Overbeck	1875/76	
889	Carl Thiersch	1876/77	
890	Rudolf Leuckart	1877/78	
891	Otto Johann Ernst Stobbe	1878/79	
892	Christian Konrad Ludwig Lange	1879/80	

=== 1880–1899 ===
No.	Name	Year	Comment
893	Christoph Ernst Luthardt	1880/81	
894	Friedrich Zarncke	1881/82	
895	Wilhelm His	1882/83	
896	Max Heinze	1883/84	
897	Bernhard Windscheid	1884/85	
898	Ferdinand Zirkel	1885/86	
899	Woldemar Gottlob Schmidt	1886/87	
900	Otto Ribbeck	1887/88	
901	Franz Adolf Hofmann	1888/89	
902	Wilhelm Wundt	1889/90	
903	Karl Binding	1890/91	
904	Justus Hermann Lipsius	1891/92	
905	Theodor Brieger	1892/93	
906	Johannes Wislicenus	1893/94	
907	Paul Flechsig	1894/95	
908	Ernst Windisch	1895/96	
910	Emil Friedberg	1896/97	
911	Curt Wachsmuth	1897/98	
912	Albert Hauck	1898/99	
913	Wilhelm Kirchner	1899/1900	

== 20th century ==
No.	Name	Year	Comment
914	Paul Zweifel	1900/01	
915	Eduard Sievers	1901/02	
916	Adolf Wach	1902/03	
917	Karl Bücher	1903/04	
918	Georg Rietschel	1904/05	
919	Gerhard Wolfgang Seeliger	1905/06	
920	Heinrich Curschmann	1906/07	
921	Carl Chun	1907/08	
922	Karl Binding	1908/09	
923	Eduard Hölder	1909/10	
924	Karl Lamprecht	1910/11	
925	Georg Heinrici	1911/12	
926	Heinrich Bruns	1912/13	
927	Otto Mayer	1913/14	
928	Albert Köster	1914/15	
927	Adolf von Strümpell	1915/16	
928	Wilhelm Stieda	1916/17	
929	Rudolf Kittel	1917/18	
930	Otto Hölder	1918	resigned
931	Rudolf Kittel	1918/19	
932	Erich Brandenburg	1919/20	
933	Richard Schmidt	1920/21	
934	Richard Heinze	1921/22	
935	Hans Held	1922/23	
936	Georg Steindorff	1923/24	
937	Franz Rendtorff	1924/25	
938	Max Le Blanc	1925/26	
939	Heinrich Siber	1926/27	
940	Erich Bethe	1927/28	
941	Oskar Römer	1928/29	
942	Friedrich Falke	1929/30	
943	Hermann Baum	1930/31	
944	Theodor Litt	1931/32	
945	Hans Achelis	1932/33	
946	Arthur Golf	1933/35	
947	Felix Krueger	1935/36	
948	Arthur Golf	1936/37	
949	Arthur Knick	1937/40	
950	Helmut Berve	1940/43	
951	Wolfgang Wilmanns	1943/45	
952	Bernhard Schweitzer	1945/46	
953	Hans-Georg Gadamer	1946/47	
954	Erwin Jacobi	1947/48	
955	Johannes Friedrich	1948/49	
956	Julius Lips	1949/50	
957	Georg Mayer	1950/64	
958	Georg Müller	1964/68	
959	Ernst Werner	1968/69	
960	Gerhard Winkler	1969/75	
961	Lothar Rathmann	1975/87	
962	Horst Hennig	1987/90	
963	Gerald Leutert	1990/91	
964	Cornelius Weiss	1991/97	
965	Volker Bigl	1997–2003	

== 21st century ==
No.	Name	From	To	Comment
966	Franz Häuser	April 23, 2003	December 2, 2010	
967	Martin Schlegel	December 3, 2010	February 28, 2011	representative
968	Beate Schücking	March 1, 2011	March 31, 2022	
969	Eva Inés Obergfell	April 1, 2022		
