= Christian Ludwig =

The name Christian Ludwig may refer to:

- Christian Ludwig of Brandenburg-Schwedt (1677–1734), recipient of Bach's Brandenburg Concertos
- Christian Ludwig II, Duke of Mecklenburg-Schwerin (1683–1756)
- Christian Ludwig Ideler (1766–1846), astronomer
- Christian Ludwig Nitzsch (1782–1837), zoologist
- Christian Ludwig Brehm (1787–1864), pastor
- Duke Christian Louis of Mecklenburg-Schwerin (1912–1996)
- Christian Ludwig (physicist) (1749–1784), German physician and physicist
- Christian Friedrich Ludwig (1757–1823), German physician and naturalist
- Christian Gottlieb Ludwig (1709–1773), German physician and botanist

Christian Ludwig, (1901 - 1967)Slowakischer architekt, funkcionalst

== See also ==
- Christian Louis (disambiguation)
