= Beate Schücking =

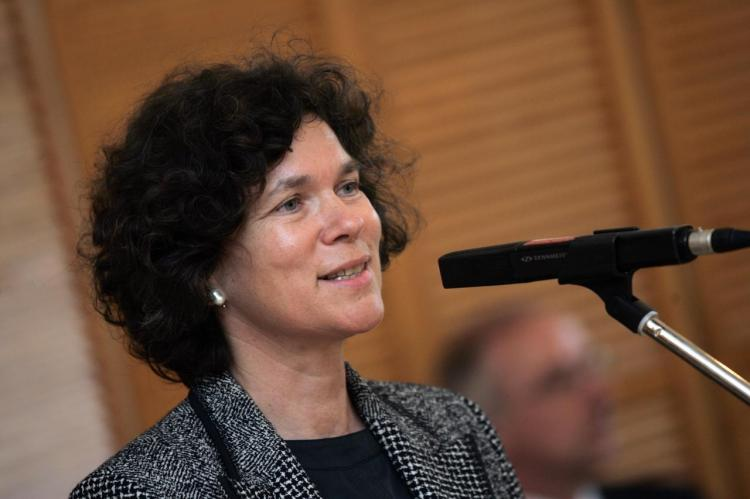

968th President of Leipzig University
- In office 1 March 2011 – 31 March 2022
- Preceded by: Franz Häuser
- Succeeded by: Eva Inés Obergfell

Personal details
- Born: Beate A. Schücking; 14 January 1956 (age 70) Kassel, West Germany
- Education: University of Ulm; Paris Descartes University
- Profession: Doctor, Scientist, University administrator

Beate A. Schücking (born 14 January 1956) is a German professor of Health Science and Psychosocial Medicine. She is the author of numerous articles and papers on aspects of scientific research and professional education. From 2011 to 2022, Schücking was the 968th President of Leipzig University as the first woman to become President since its founding in 1409.

== Early life and career ==
Schücking was born in Kassel, and raised in rural Hesse, where her family lived in the medieval castle of Neuenstein, near Bad Hersfeld. She is the daughter of Ursula Schücking (née von Hamm) and Hermann-Reyner Schücking. Her paternal grandfather, Walther Schücking was a German liberal politician, professor of international law and the first German judge at the Permanent Court of International Justice in The Hague from 1930-1935. Her great-grandfather was the German novelist Levin Schücking (1814–1883).

Schücking attended Medical School in Ulm, received her degree as an MD in 1981, and her PhD magna cum laude in Hematology in the same year from the University of Ulm. She went on to earn her diploma as assistant étrangère at the University of Paris René Descartes in 1980. As a member of the Faculty of Medicine at the Philipps University in Marburg (1981-1989) she specialized in Internal Medicine, Psychosocial Medicine and Family Medicine. From 1989 to 1995 she served as professor of medicine and health science at the University of Applied Science in Munich. In addition Dr. Schücking was the founding director of the Maternal and Child Health research unit at Osnabrück University, where she was a member of the faculty for 15 years serving as both a teacher in health science and a researcher in obstetrics and health, guiding the transformation from midwifery as an apprenticeship-based profession into an academic field with a multidisciplinary research focus. Several of her former doctoral students are among the first Professors of Midwifery in Germany. While in Osnabrück, she was elected Dean of the Faculty of Health Science, Psychology and Cognitive Science in 2000, and Vice-President for Research and Doctoral Studies in 2004.

== President of Leipzig University ==
In November 2010, she was elected President of the alma mater lipsiensis in Leipzig, Germany's second oldest University. Her appointment followed the departure of Franz Häuser. On 2 December 2010 Schücking delivered her inauguration address: “A healthy University”. Schücking has since led the institution through a period of significant financial challenges for higher education in the East German states especially. She negotiated the first contract of Leipzig University with the federal state of Saxony for sustainable funding (2014–16), broadened the University's international reach, and sharpened the profile of the University with her commitment to biodiversity research, life science and digital humanities. She included Leipzig University in the German U15, the large Research Universities of Germany network, and was the elected head of Saxony's confederation of Universities from 2011 until 2014. On 31 January 2017 Schücking was reelected President of Leipzig University to another five-year term. On 31 March 2022, Schücking's term as President of Leipzig University ended. Her successor in office is jurist and former Humboldt University of Berlin professor Eva Inés Obergfell.

== Works ==
Beate Schücking is widely published in scholarly sources, including BMC Pregnancy, Childbirth, Social Science and medicine, the Journal of Reproductive and Infant Psychology, the Journal of Maternal-Fetal & Neonatal Medicine, Midwifery, Infant Mental Health Journal and the Encyclopedia of Public Health.

== International work and awards ==
Schücking has lectured widely throughout the United States, Canada, France, the Czech Republic, Norway, Sweden, Luxembourg, Austria, the Netherlands and Germany. She was a visiting professor at Vienna University (1996) and Boston University (2003). Beate Schücking was awarded a scholarship of Studienstiftung des deutschen Volkes, several research grants from German Research Foundation (DFG), Volkswagen-Foundation and the German Ministry of Research and Technology. Recently Schücking has also convened an EU-funded network for optimizing childbirth across Europe.

== Other activities ==
- Helmholtz Centre for Environmental Research, Member of the Supervisory Board
- Max Planck Institute for Mathematics in the Sciences (MPI MiS), Member of the Board of Trustees
- Moritzbastei Foundation, Member of the Board of Trustees
- Total E-Quality initiative, Member of the Board of Trustees
