= August Friedrich Müller =

German legal scholar and logician (1684–1761)

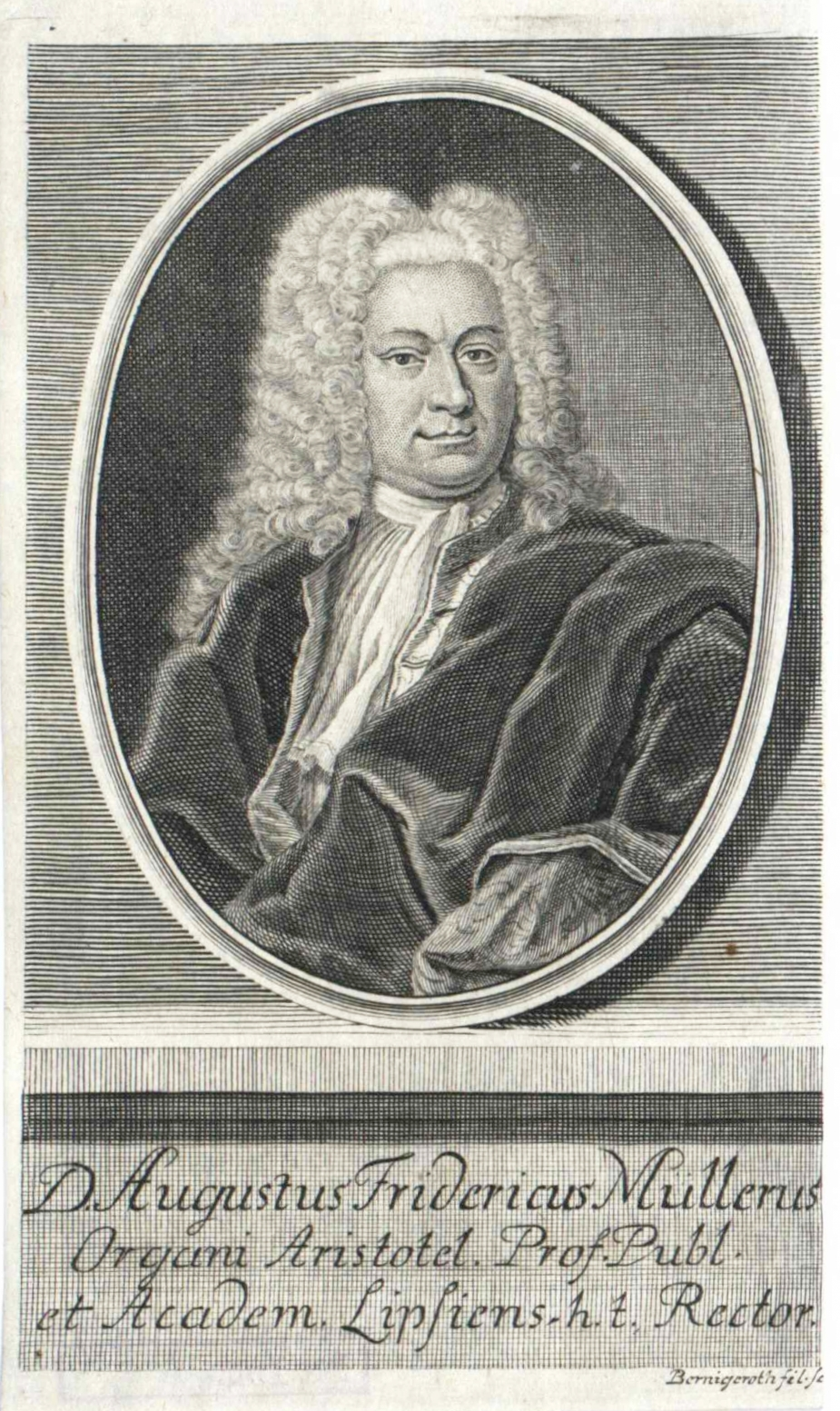
August Friedrich Müller

August Friedrich Müller (15 December 1684 – 1 May 1761) was a German legal scholar and logician.

August Friedrich was born in Penig, Electorate of Saxony, the son of Johann Adam Müller and his wife Johanne Susanne, daughter of a pharmacist in Rochlitz, Johann Fromhold. Prefigured by his father, he attended school in 1697 and studied at the University of Leipzig from 1703. Here he completed a degree in early philosophical sciences; Andreas Rüdiger (1673–1731) was his most important teacher. On the side he studied law under Gottlieb Gerhard Titius (1661–1714).

In 1707 he received his degree of Magister in Leipzig, where he set up a school of philosophy. After a stay at the University of Erfurt, where on 8 October 1714 he received his doctorate in law, he returned to Leipzig, where he also lectured on law. A position was offered to him at the University of Halle but he became an associate professor of philosophy at the University of Leipzig in 1732, succeeding Christian Thomasius and his pupil, Andreas Rüdiger. He was Dean of Philosophy several times, first in 1736. He died in Leipzig, aged 76.

Bach composed the cantata Zerreißet, zersprenget, zertrümmert die Gruft, BWV 205 in 1725 for the name day of Müller and performed the piece on the evening of 3 August 1725 in front of the professor's house at 2 Katharinenstraße in Leipzig.

== Works ==
- Diss. de arte loquendi. Leipzig 1708
- Diss. inaug. de rationibus legum investigandis; ad L. 20. 21 D. de LL. Erfurt 1714
- Diss. de fictionum iuris Romani usu antiquo, non-usu hodierno. Leipzig 1715
- Balthasar Graciaans Qracul, das man mit sich führen und stets bey der Hand haben kann, das ist: Kunst – Regeln der Klugheit, vormahls von Mr. Amelot de la Houffaye unter dem Titel l'Homme de Cour ins Französische, anietzo aber aus dem Spanischen Original, welches durch und durch hinzngefüget worden, ins Teutsche übersetzt und mit neuen Anmerkungen, in welchen die Maximen des Autoris aus den Principiis der Sitten-Lehre erklähret und beurtheilet werden, versehen. 1. Centurie. Leipzig 1716, 2. Centurie Leipzig 1717, 3. Centurie. Leipzig 1719, new edition Leipzig 1738 (2 volumes)
- Einleitung in die philosophischen Wissenschaften. 3 volumes. Leipzig 1728, 2nd edition Leipzig 1733
- Progr. inaug. sub aufpiciis Professionis philosophiae extraord. Leipzig 1731
- Progr. inaug. cum Professionem Organi Aristotelici capesseret. Leipzig 1732
- Diss. pro loco in facultate philosophica obtinendo de emigratione religionis caussa suscipienda. Leipzig 1732
- Progr. de argumentatione dialectica Aristoteli usitata. Leipzig 1736
- Progr. de Stoicorum Paradoxis. Leipzig 1736
- Progr. de notione legis. Leipzig 1740
- Progr. de successione hereditaria ex iure naturali. Leipzig 1743 Continuatio. Leipzig 1743
- Progr. de praemiis viris strennis a Platone decretis. Leipzig 1744
- Progr. de usucapione et praescriptione longi temporis ex principiis naturalibus. Leipzig 1744
- Progr. I et II de principio contradictionis. Leipzig 1746
- Progr. I et II de origine civitatum. Leipzig 1750
- Progr. de lectione librorum docta. Leipzig 1752
- Progr. de perceptione clara et distincta. Leipzig 1754
- Progr. I et II de notione legis naturalis detracta utilitatis ratione concepta. Leipzig 1758
- Progr. de libertate naturali et imperii humani limitibus. Leipzig 1760
