= Johann Erhard Kapp =

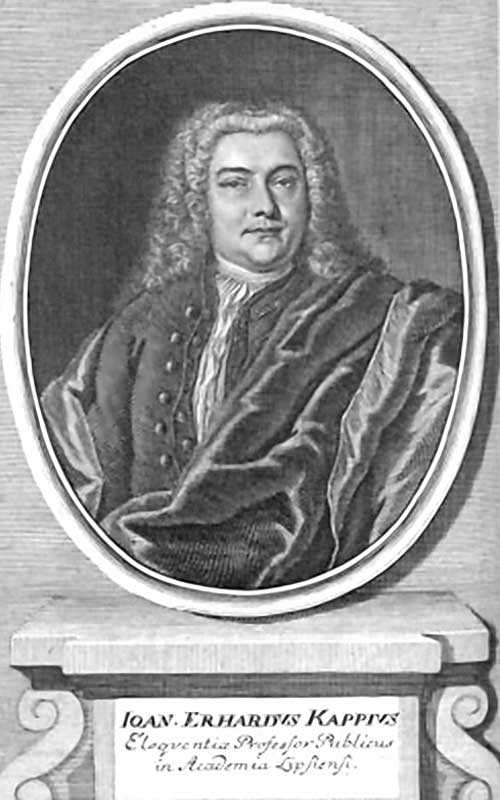
Johann Erhard Kapp 1735

Johann Erhard Kapp (23 March 1696 – 7 February 1756) was a German rhetorician and historian.

== Life ==
Johann Erhard Kapp was born in Oberkotzau, a small market town in the hill country between Leipzig and Nuremberg. His father was a carter ("Fuhrmann"). In 1796 he enrolled at the secondary school ("Gymnasium") in Hof, a couple of hours to the north of Oberkotzau. However, according to at least one source he was removed from the school after six months and instead taught privately. In 1714 he moved away from home to study at Leipzig University, where he would make his career. Among his more noteworthy teachers, Christian Friedrich Börner (1663-1753) taught him Biblical Exegesis and aspects of Church History. Johann Gottlob Carpzov (1679-1767) introduced him to New Testament scholarship. In an age before university libraries had become mainstream, another Leipzig scholar, Johann Burckhardt Mencke, provided valuable support by allowing Kapp access to his extensive personal library. The denominational context in the Leipzig Theological faculty was by this time one of Lutheran orthodoxy.

Thus prepared, in 1715 Kapp entered Johann Georg Walch's College of Historical Literature, obtaining on 17 February 1718 a Magister degree in Philosophy. He was by now also a member of the College of Practical Exegesis ("collegium exegeticum practicum") headed up by Börner and of the College of Disputation ("collegium disputatiorum") led by Carpzov, following keenly the lectures of both men. On 20 December 1720 he received a Magister Legens ("Habilitation") degree in return for a piece of work on the distribution of indulgences. He was now qualified as a university lecturer. He also took the opportunity to produce journalistic output, producing suitably scholarly critiques of leading academics which were published under the heading "Nova literaria" in the weekly journal "Neue Zeitungen von gelehrten Sachen".

On 14 March 1723 he became an Adjunct professor in the Philosophy faculty. In 1727 he became a fellow ("Kollegiat") of the Great Princely College ("Fürstenkollegium"). In 1727 he was granted an extraordinary professorship in Rhetoric, and on 5 April 1734 a full professorship in it.

In 1735 he was given an additional post as "Programmatist". One of his responsibilities in this role involved producing biographical compilations for deceased members of the university. Kapp also took his share of administrative responsibilities more generally, serving on several occasions as dean of the Philosophy faculty. He also served as university rector on six occasion between 1734 and 1754, always during a summer term.

He died after a long illness at Leipzig on 7 February 1756. By that time he had risen to the position of one of the university's "Decemviri". His extensive library was auctioned in 1758.

== Family ==
Johann Erhard Kapp married Dorothea Sophia Weise (1709-1751) on 8 April 1738. She was a daughter of Christian Weise, the minister at St. Thomas's church in Leipzig, better remembered by subsequent generations as the church where Johann Sebastian Bach was the director of music for more than a quarter of a century. She herself was a God-daughter of Bach's fifth recorded son, Johann Christoph Friedrich Bach (1732-1795).

One child of the marriage was the physician and biologist Christian Erhard Kapp (1739-1824).

== Academic focus ==
Kapp made his name, primarily, with his work on Reformation History, much of which resonates even today. He produced a number of biographical essays on eminent contemporaries which also continue to find readers. When Valentin Ernst Löscher died he took over as producer of the journal "Unschuldige Nachrichten von alten und neuen theologischen Sachen", which he continued to direct till his death. Judged by his academic research work, he was a close follower of Johann Martin Chladenius' Hermeneutic approach.

He joined with Siegmund Friedrich Dresig to conduct a literary disputation against Christian Siegmund Georgi in respect of the latter's New Testament exegesis and criticism.

== Publisher output (selection) ==
- Diss. hist. de nonnullis indulgentiarum quaestoribus saeculi 15 et 16. Leipzig 1720
- Schauplatz des Tezelischen Ablaßkrams und des dawider streitenden Lutheri. Leipzig 1720
- Sammlung einiger zum päpstlichen Ablaß überhaupt, sonderheit aber zu den zwischen Mart. Luther und Joh. Tetzel hievon geführten Streitigkeiten gehörigen Streitschriften mit Einleitung und Anmerkungen versehen. Leipzig 1721
- Kleine Nachlese einiger größtentheils noch ungedruckter, und sonderlich zur Erläuterung der Reformationsgeschichte nützlicher Urkunden. 4 vols, Leipzig 1727–33
- Abhandlung zur christlichen Archäologie und zur Erklärung altchristlicher Denkmäler. 1747 * Prolusio, utrum signum palmae tumulis christianorum adjectum certum martyrii sit signum nec ne?
- De origine Doctorum theologiae et Magistrorum artium horumque dignitate. 1735
