= Johann Carl Gehler =

German physician, mineralogist and anatomist

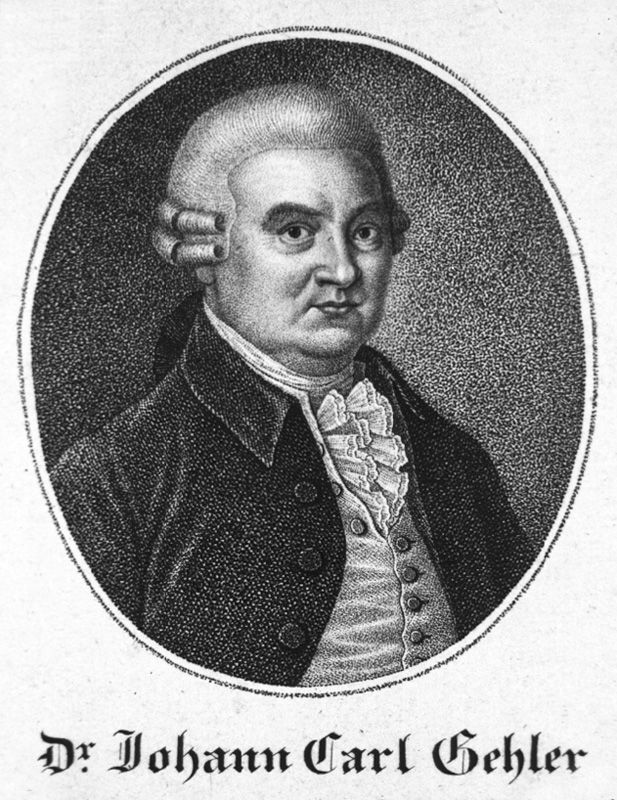
- Born: 17 May 1732; Görlitz, Germany
- Died: 6 May 1796 (aged 64)
- Scientific career
- Fields: Physics; Mineralogy; Anatomy
- Doctoral advisor: Christian Gottlieb Ludwig
- Doctoral students: Abraham Gottlob Werner

Johann Carl Gehler (17 May 1732 – 6 May 1796) was a German physician, mineralogist, and anatomist.

Born 17 May 1732 in Görlitz, Gehler studied medicine from 1751 to 1758 at the University of Leipzig, where he was a pupil of physician and botanist Christian Gottlieb Ludwig. While a student at Leipzig, he furthered his interest in natural sciences, publishing the mineralogical treatise, De characteribus fossilium externis (1757), as a result. Following graduation, he continued his education by studying mineralogy in Freiberg and obstetrics in Strasbourg as a student of Johann Jakob Fried (1689–1769).

After his return to Leipzig, he served as a lecturer in mineralogy, and in the meantime, maintained a successful medical practice, of which, he specialized in midwifery. In 1763 he was named an associate professor of botany at the university. Later on at Leipzig, he successively held professorships in physiology (1773–1781), anatomy and surgery (1781–1784), pathology (1784–1789) and therapy (1789–1796). From 1789 to 1796, he served as dean of the medical faculty. He was a member of the Ökonomischen Gesellschaft.

== Published works ==
- De characteribus fossilium externis, Leipzig 1757; later translated into German by Abraham Gottlob Werner as Abhandlung über die äußeren Kennzeichen der Fossilien (1774) – Treatise on the external characteristic of fossils.
- Herrn Anton Baumé. Erläuterte Experimental-Chemie Leipzig 1775 – Antoine Baumé. Illustrated Experimental Chemistry, translated from French into German by Gehler.
- De fossilium physiognomiis, Leipzig 1786.
- Kleine Schriften, die Entbindungskunst betreffend, Leipzig 1798 (edited after his death by Karl Gottlob Kühn) – Smaller works, on midwifery, 2 volumes.
