= Christian Louis =

Christian Louis may refer to:

- Christian Louis I, Duke of Mecklenburg (1623–1692)
- Christian Louis, Count of Waldeck (1635–1706)
- Christian Louis, Duke of Brunswick-Lüneburg (1622–1665)
- Duke Christian Louis of Mecklenburg (1912–1996)
- Christian Louis de Massy (born 1949), son of Princess Antoinette of Monaco

== See also ==
- Christian Ludwig (disambiguation)
