= Christian Siegmund Georgi =

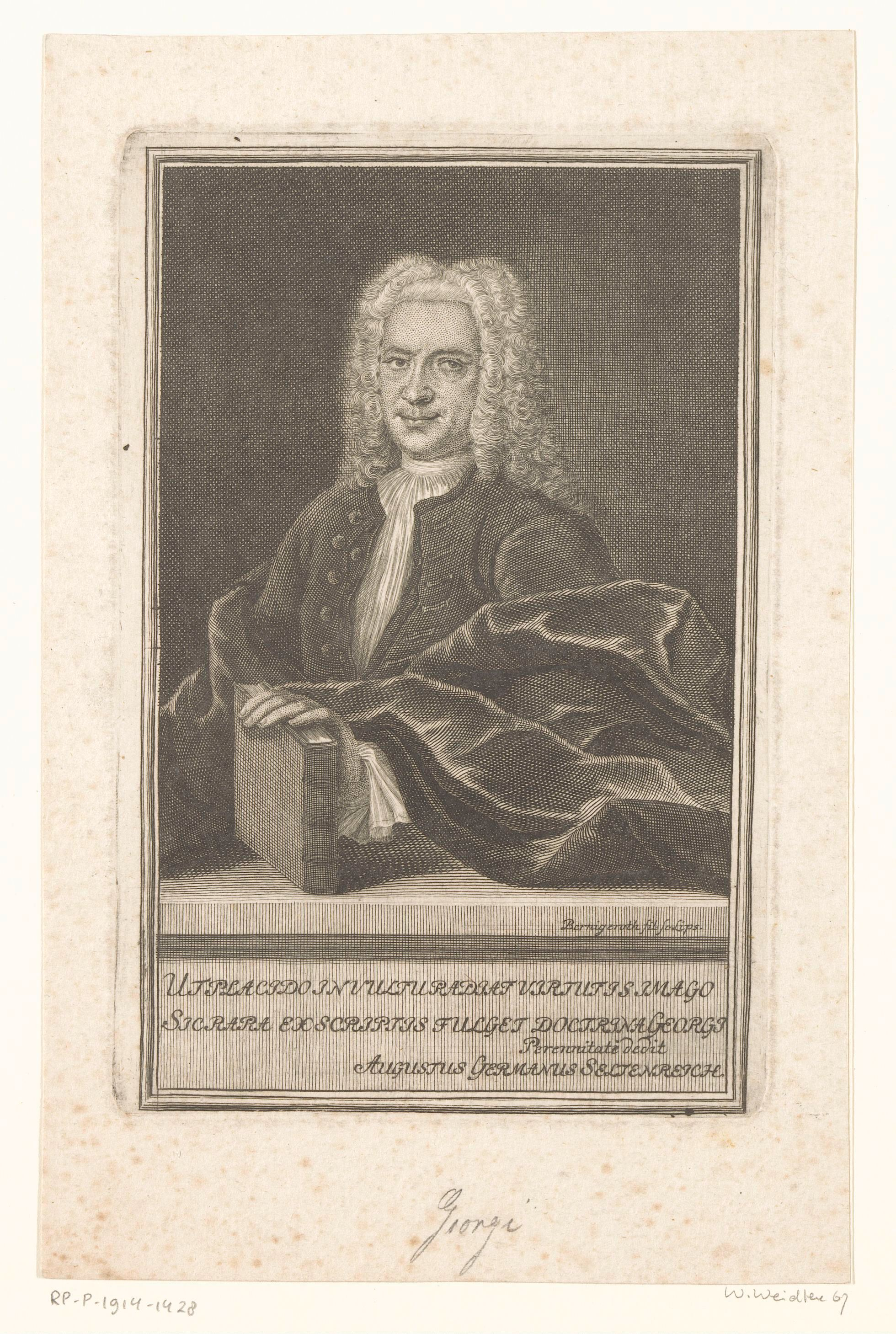
Christian Siegmund Georgi

Christian Siegmund Georgi (20 July 1702 - 6 September 1771) was an evangelical theologian at Wittenberg in the heart of Germany.

== Life ==
Christian Siegmund Georgi was born in Luckau, a small town in Lusatian flat lands south of Berlin. His father was a senior official ("Oberamtsadvokat") in the town. He attended school locally till 1720 when he moved to Zwickau to further his education. On 4 June 1722 he enrolled at the University of Wittenberg. Alongside his interest in Theology, he initially devoted himself to the study of classical and oriental languages. On 30 April 1723 he was awarded his Magister degree from the Philosophy Faculty.

He received his habilitation on 1 February 1726 at the Wittenberg Academy with a dissertation entitled "De Chaldaeosyrismis Rabbinismis et Persismis dictioni Novi Foederis immerito affictis". On 17 November 1727 he became an adjunct professor at the Philosophy Faculty, and an extraordinary professor of Philology in 1736. In 1743 he was appointed a full professor of Theology, the subject in which he received his doctorate on 17 October 1748.

Georgi was more than once appointed Dean of the Theology Faculty, a rotating appointment which he held during the winter terms of 1758 and 1764. In 1770 he served as Rector of the Wittenberg Academy. His most outstanding contribution was in the fields of new testament criticism and exegesis. His approach made for deep differences with Johannes Vorst and Johannes Olearius He also conducted in a long running "literary disputation" with Johann Erhard Kapp and Siegmund Friedrich Dresig. Alongside university disputations and presentations involving matters of dogma, Georgi contributed chronicles and historical works.

== Output (selection) ==
- De Ebraismis dictioni N. T. immerito affictis, 1726–27
- De puritate Graecorum N. T. fontium Attica a Dorismis, Boeotismis atque poettismis aliena, 1731
- Vindicarium N. T. ab Ebraismis libri 3, 1732
- De Latinismis Graecae N. Foederis dictioni immerito affictis, 1731
- Hierocritius N. T. sive de stylo N. T. libri 3
- Pars 2 sive controversiarum de Latinismis N. T. libri 3
- Apologia dissertationis de latismis … vindicata, 1732
- Apparatus philologico- theologicus ad Evangelia, Domini festisque diebus dedicta, Vol. 1-4, 1745–57
- Annales Academiae Vitebergensis 1655–1755
- Usque ad annum 1772
- Continuati ab E. G. Chr. Schroedero,
- Wittenbergische Klage-Geschichte, Reprint, Verlag J. Siener, 1993, Stuttgart, ISBN 3-929955-00-8
