= Helfrich Bernhard Wenck =

German historian and educator (1739–1803)

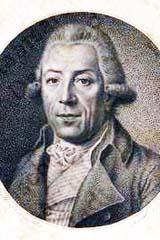
Helfrich Bernhard Wenck

Helfrich Bernhard Wenck (19 June 1739 – 27 April 1803) was a German historian and educator born in Idstein, Hesse.

He attended the Darmstadt Pädagogium, where his father, Johann Martin Wenck, served as rector. He later studied in Giessen and Göttingen, and in August 1761, was hired at the Darmstadt Pädagogium as a collaborator. Here, he served as sub-conrector (from 1766), pro-rector (from 1768) and as rector (from 1769). From 1775, he worked as an historiographer, and he later attained the position of consistorialrath in 1778. In 1783 he became member of the Academiae Theodoro-Palatinae in Mannheim (today University of Mannheim).

His best known literary effort was a work on Hessian history called Hessische Landesgeschichte, published in three volumes between 1783 and 1803. Another noted work of his was Lateinische Grammatik für Schulen (Latin grammar for schools), later revised in 1823, by Georg Friedrich Grotefend (1775–1853).

He was the brother of historian Friedrich August Wilhelm Wenck (1741–1810).

== Literature ==
- Karl Robert Wenck: Wenck, Helfrich Bernhard. In: Allgemeine Deutsche Biographie (ADB). Band 41, Duncker & Humblot, Leipzig 1896, p. 703–709.
