= Georg Müller (agricultural scientist) =

- Born: October 13, 1917; Budaörs, Hungary
- Died: 23 December 2004; Leipzig, Saxony, Germany
- Occupations: Agricultural scientist University Rector (Leipzig)

Georg Müller (13 October 1917 – 23 December 2004) was a Hungarian born German agricultural scientist.

== Life ==
Georg Müller was born in Budaörs, a prosperous town a short distance to the west of Budapest in Hungary. His father, a member of the region's ethnic German minority, was employed in the building trade. Müller attended primary school locally and secondary school in Budapest. In 1937 or 1938 he started a study course in Agronomy at Budapest which he concluded in 1942. In 1942 he took a job as Plant Protection Inspector in the Budapest region. In 1943 he was called up for military service and in 1945 he was captured by the Red army, becoming a Soviet prisoner of war.

After being relocated to Saxony in the Soviet occupation zone of what remained of Germany in 1947, Müller became a member of the zone's recently formed Socialist Unity Party (SED / Sozialistische Einheitspartei Deutschlands). He took a job as a Records Inspector, and then became a Department Head in the local government at Großenhain in Saxony. In 1950 he became a Department Head responsible for potato breeding at the national Agriculture and Plant Institute at Müncheberg a short distance to the east of Berlin. In the meantime the entire Soviet occupation zone became the Soviet sponsored German Democratic Republic, formally in October 1949. A few years later, in 1952 or 1953, Georg Müller received his doctorate from Berlins' Humboldt University. His dissertation concerned the possibilities for increasing the starch contents of different types of potato. He went on to gain his habilitation in Soil sciences from the Humboldt in 1956. His dissertation was entitled "Investigations of interactions between soil types in respect of 24 forage crops".

Müller took a teaching professorship at the "Karl Marx University" (as it was then known) in Leipzig in 1958. In 1961 he was appointed Director of the university's institute for Soil Sciences and Microbiology. He was also, from 1964 till 1968, the University Rector (President/Vice-chancellor) in succession to Georg Mayer. Along with this, between 1964 and 1969 he was a member of the regional leadership team (Bezirksleitung) of The Party.

His Institute was moved to Halle in 1968, and Müller went with it, taking the same professorial position at the Martin Luther University of Halle-Wittenberg as that which he had previously held further south. He retired in 1982.

== Publications ==
Published output
not a complete list
- Über Fragen der Bodenmikrobiologie in der Sowjetunion (1954)
- Krankheiten und Schädlinge der Kartoffel, Jena 1955.
- Boden-Biologie, Jena 1965.
- Die Bedeutung der vitalen und postmortalen organischen Bodensubstanz aus der Sicht der Bodenfruchtbarkeit und des Bodenschutzes, Berlin (East) 1983.
- (with Ernst Ewald) Bodenkunde, 3rd revised edition, Berlin (East) 1989.
- (with Rudolf Schubert) Ökologie, 3rd edition., Jena 1991.

Müller's most important publication while he was a Leipzig was his book "Soil Biology" (1965). The book found a welcome across Europe and in the United States because it filled an important gap in the mainstream academic literature, treating soil bacteriology, microbiology and the related zoology holistically, focusing on the possibilities for increasing soil productivity.

== Awards and honours ==
- 1966: Honorary Doctorate Columbia University
- 1967: National Prize 3rd class
- 1967: Honorary Doctorate Shevchenko National University of Kiev
- 1971: Honorary Doctorate Martin Luther University of Halle-Wittenberg
- 1980: Honoured National University Teacher
- 1981: Honorary Doctorate Agricultural University of Hungary
