= Christian Ludwig (physicist) =

German physician (1749–1784)

Christian Ludwig (17 May 1749, in Leipzig – 25 February 1784) was a German physician and physicist. He was the son of botanist Christian Gottlieb Ludwig.

== Life ==
In 1772, he obtained his philosophy degree (magister), then received his medical doctorate in 1774. Following a study trip through Germany, France and England, he returned to Leipzig as a lecturer of physics. He died in Leipzig on 25 February 1784, age 34.

== Publications ==
He published German translations of Joseph Priestley's experiments and observations on the different kinds of air, "Versuche und Beobachtungen über verschiedene Gattungen der Luft" and of John Elliot's physiological observations involving the senses, "Physiologische Beobachtungen über die Sinne". Other noted works by Ludwig are:

- Dissertatio de aethere varie moto causa diversitatis luminum, (1773).
- De Hydrope Cerebri Pverorvm, (1774).
