= Christian Gottlieb Jöcher =

German academic, librarian and lexicographer

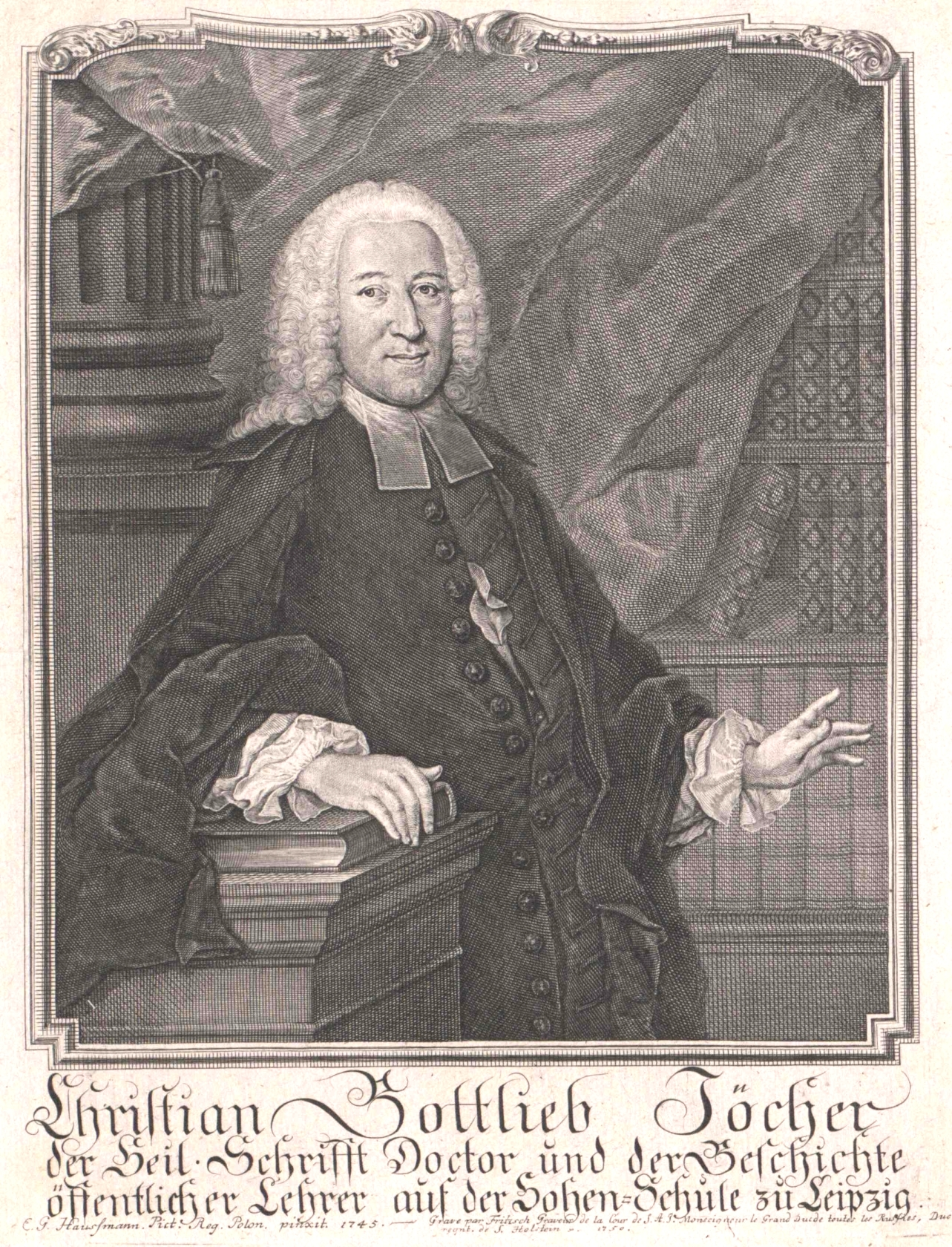
- Born: 20 July 1694; Leipzig
- Died: 10 May 1758 (aged 63); Leipzig
- Occupations: academic, librarian, lexicographer
- Known for: professor, librarian at University of Leipzig
- Notable work: alphabetic catalogue of the collections in Leipzig University Library

Christian Gottlieb Jöcher (20 July 1694 – 10 May 1758) was a German academic, librarian and lexicographer.

Jöcher was born in Leipzig, Electorate of Saxony. He became a professor of history at the University of Leipzig in 1732. From 1742, he was university librarian in the Leipzig University Library, where he began the complete alphabetic catalogue of the collections.

He authored the Allgemeines Gelehrten-Lexicon ("General Dictionary of the Learned") in four volumes, published from 1733 to 1751, and was editor of the literary journal Deutsche Acta Eruditorum from 1719. He died in Leipzig.

== Work ==
- Compendiöses Gelehrten-Lexicon: Darinne die Gelehrten aller Stände so wohl männ- als weiblichen Geschlechts, welche vom Anfang der Welt bis auf ietztige Zeit gelebt, und sich der gelehrten Welt bekannt gemacht, nach ihrer Geburt, Absterben, Schrifften, Leben und merckwürdigen Geschichten aus denen glaubwürdigsten Scribenten nach dem Entwurff des sel. D. Joh. Burckh. Menckens in alphabetischer Ordnung beschrieben werden. In zwei Theilen. Die dritte Auflage heraus gegeben von Christian Gottlieb Jöcher, Leipzig 1733

== Literature ==
- Cole, Richard Glenn. “The Art of History and Eighteenth-Century Information Management: Christian Gottlieb Jöcher and Johann Heinrich Zedler.” The Library Quarterly: Information, Community, Policy 83, no. 1 (2013): 26–38. https://doi.org/10.1086/668573.
- Jakob Franck (1881). "Jöcher, Christian Gottlieb" . Allgemeine Deutsche Biographie (in German). Vol. 14. Leipzig: Duncker & Humblot. pp. 103–105.
- Notker Hammerstein (1974). "Jöcher, Christian Gottlieb". Neue Deutsche Biographie (in German). Vol. 10. Berlin: Duncker & Humblot. p. 452.
