= Jakob Franck =

German philologist and teacher

Jakob Franck (18 February 1811 - 17 September 1884) was a German philologist and teacher who contributed more than 300 biographical entries to the German General Biographical Dictionary ("Allgemeine Deutsche Biographie").

== Life ==
Jakob Franck was born in Wachenheim an der Haardt (today Wachenheim an der Weinstraße) in the wine growing district across the river, east of Mannheim. His father was a wine producer. Franck attended a Latin (classics focused) school in nearby Dürkheim before moving on to the prestigious Grammar School in Zweibrücken. He then studied Theology at Erlangen and Utrecht.

After this he supported himself for a lengthy period as a home tutor at Waldfischbach, also working as an assistant to the priest in a nearby village. However, he found the region over-supplied with theologians and accordingly, having been a good student during his school days, was able to switch his focus to Philology, and in 1837 obtained a junior teaching post at the newly established Latin school at Annweiler, a short distance to the south of his home region. Following a series of promotions he had become, by 1845, the school's subrector (deputy head teacher).

During the 1848 Revolution Franck was politically active. Sources refer to his burning patriotism: nevertheless, he avoided coming into direct conflict with the law, and was accordingly spared from any involvement with the courts during the reactionary government backlash that followed.

He became a specialist in German studies and contributed to the collection of popular sayings being gathered by his friend Friedrich Wilhelm Wander. The Free German Cultural Foundation granted him the title of "Master" in recognition of his deep knowledge of German literature. In 1872 Franck was appointed to the governing board of the Latin school in Landau, prior to a period of expansion at the school which became a full Gymnasium (secondary school) in 1874. The appointment was a royal one, and represented implicit official recognition of his exceptional scholarly abilities. In 1874 he was appointed subrector (deputy head teacher) at the Latin school in Edenkoben, a position he held till his retirement in 1877.

Jakob Franck contributed more than 300 biographical articles to the German General Biographical Dictionary ("Allgemeine Deutsche Biographie"). He was a part of the social circle that also included the historian Wilhelm Wattenbach and the scholar Karl Bartsch. He himself received an honorary doctorate from Heidelberg University. He worked for the news-sheet "Palatinate Museum" ("Pfälzisches Museum") and also wrote for the literary news-sheet Serapeum.
