= Joachim Feller =

German academic (1638–1691)

Joachim Feller (30 November 1638 – 15 April 1691) was a German professor at the University of Leipzig and from 1675 head of its university library.

He was born on 30 November 1638 at Zwickau. Joachim Feller studied theology and philology in Leipzig. He then taught at the Old St Nicholas School in Leipzig. In 1676 he became professor of poetry at the University of Leipzig and held the rectorate in 1680, 1684 and 1688.

In 1670 he married Anna Dorothea Rappolt (1653–1676), daughter of the rector of the University of Leipzig. In 1677 he married a sister of his pupil Christian Thomasius, the 25 years younger Johanna Thomasius, daughter of the philosopher Jakob Thomasius (1622–1684). The marriage produced four children, of which one daughter married the mayor of Leipzig (for a long time). His son Joachim Friedrich Feller (1673–1726) became a pupil and collaborator of Gottfried Wilhelm Leibniz.

Feller died in 1691 after a window fall caused by somnambulie in Leipzig.

He was also known in Leipzig for his extensive private library.

== Sources ==
- Reinhard Breymayer (ed.): Luctuosa desideria. Wiedergefundene Gedenkschriften auf den Leipziger pietistischen Studenten Martin Born (1666 – 1689). Mit Gedichten von Joachim Feller, August Hermann Francke und anderen. Teil 1. Luctuosa desideria und Vetterliche und Freund-verbundene Letzte Pflicht. Text. 1. Auflage, Noûs-Verlag Thomas Leon Heck, Tübingen 2008. ISBN 978-3-924249-42-7.
- Reinhard Breymayer / Red[aktion]: Feller, Joachim, auch: Cholander, Franciscus Dermasius. In Walther Killy Killy Literaturlexikon. Autoren und Werke des deutschsprachigen Kulturraumes. 2., vollständig überarb. Auflage, Vol. 3. Berlin, New York: Walter de Gruyter & Co. (2008), pp. 404–405. ISBN 978-3-11-018962-9.
