= John Elliot (physician) =

John Elliot MD (1747 – 22 July 1787) was a physician and scientist in eighteenth-century London who was the first person to conjecture that different parts of the retina respond to particular colours of light. He was obsessed with Mary Boydell, niece of the publisher John Boydell, and in 1787 was arrested for attempting to murder her. Although acquitted of attempted murder, he starved himself to death while awaiting trial for assault in Newgate Gaol.

== Bibliography ==
- —. Narrative of the Life and Death of John Elliot, M.D. Containing an account of the rise progress and catastrophe of his unhappy passion for Miss Mary Boydell, a review of his writings together with an apology written by himself under the pressure of expected condemnation after his commitment for attempting to assassinate Miss Boydell. London, 1787.
- —. "John Elliot, M.D.". The Newgate Calendar, Vol. IV, 164-168. London: Navarre Society Ltd., 1926.
- Elliot, John. Elements of Natural Philosophy. London, 1792.
- Mollon, J.D. "The Origins of Modern Color Science". The Science of Color. London: Elsevier Ltd, 2003. ISBN 0-444-51251-9. Retrieved on 29 January 2008.
- Mollon, John. "John Elliot". Oxford Dictionary of National Biography. Oxford University Press. 2004. Retrieved on 30 January 2008.
