= Valentin Alberti =

German philosopher, logician, and theologian (1635–1697)

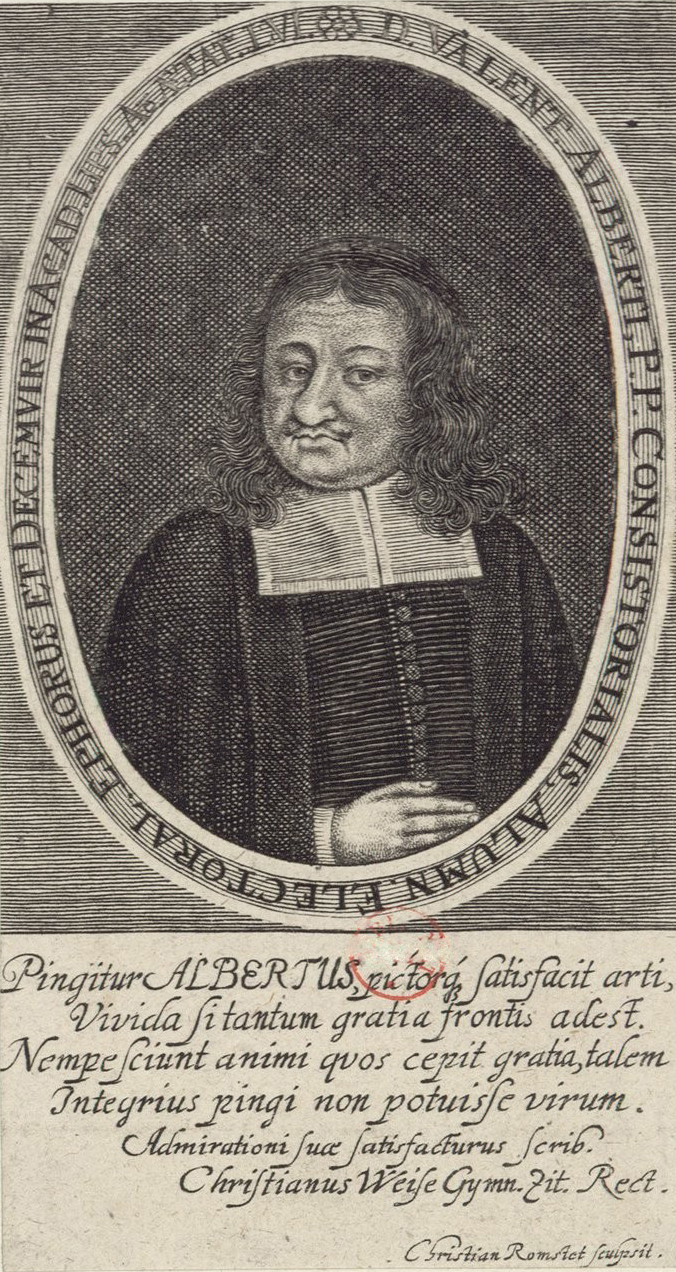
- Alberti by Christian Romstet, c. 1690
- Born: 15 December 1635; Lehn, Saxony
- Died: 15 September 1697 (aged 61); Leipzig, Saxony
- Occupations: Logician, philosopher, and theologian

Academic background
- Education: University of Leipzig (Mg)

Academic work
- Institutions: University of Leipzig
- Doctoral students: Christian Thomasius

Personal life
- Known for: Defending Lutheran orthodoxy

Religious life
- Religion: Lutheran

Valentin Alberti (15 December 1635 – 15 September 1697) was a Lutheran, orthodox philosopher and theologian from Silesia and was the son of a preacher.

He is known for defending Lutheran orthodoxy against the natural law views of Hugo Grotius, Samuel von Pufendorf and Christian Thomasius, and being an active polemicist against Roman Catholicism.

He began his studies at the University of Leipzig in 1656, obtaining the Magister degree in 1656. By 1663, he was already a professor of logic and metaphysics and in 1672 he became an associate professor of theology as well. Alberti was one of the principal representatives of Christian natural law Juris Naturae Orthodoxae Compendium Theologiae Conformatum and Samuel von Pufendorf's main opponent.

In 1665, he married the daughter of the Leipzig city judge Johannis Preibisi.

Alberti supervised the thesis of Christian Stridtbeckh on the possibility of a pact with the devil. They published in 1690 and 1716 in Latin, and in 1723 in German. He held theological opinions maintaining the possibility of reincarnation of souls from purgatory.
