= Christian Daniel Beck =

German historian and theologian (1757–1832)

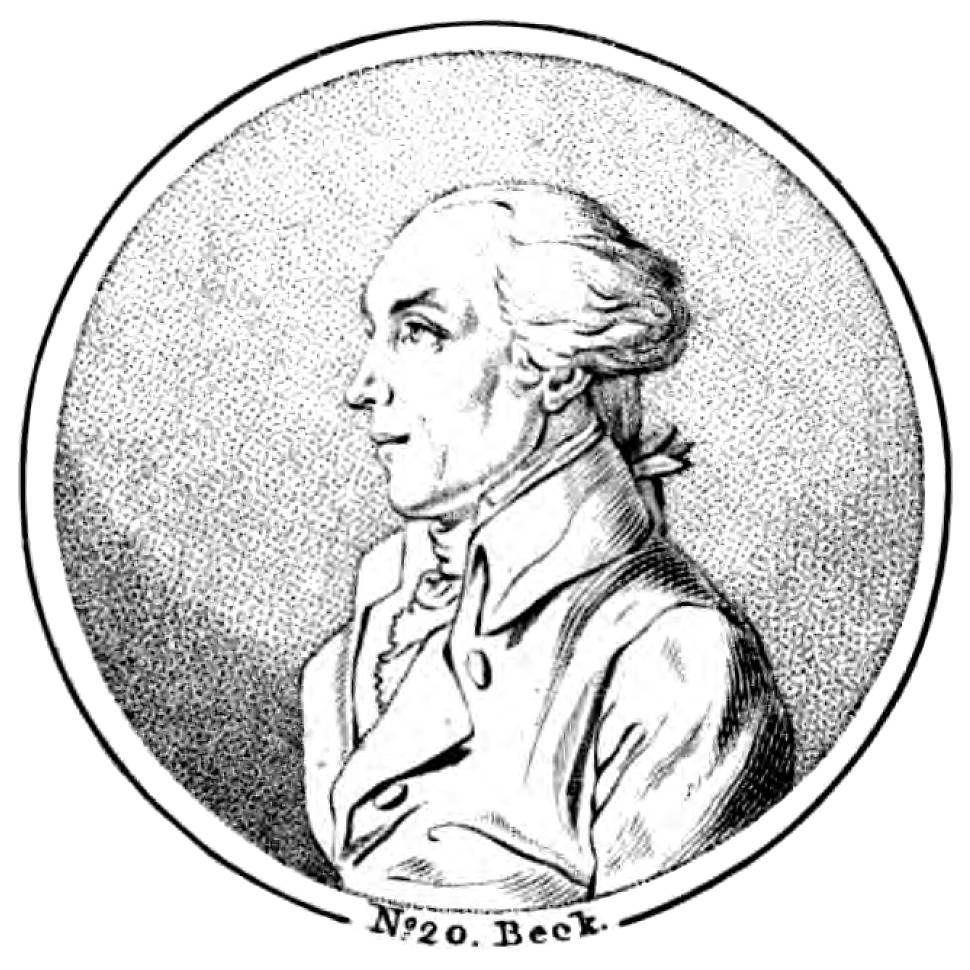

Christian Daniel Beck (22 January 1757 – 13 December 1832) was a German philologist, historian, theologian and antiquarian, one of the most learned men of his time.

== Biography ==
Beck was born at Leipzig and studied at Leipzig University, where in 1785 he was appointed professor of Greek and Latin literature. This post he resigned in 1819 in order to take up the professorship of history, but resumed it in 1825. In 1819, he also became editor of the Allgemeines Reportorium der neuesten in- und ausländischen Litteratur (Reports on the latest in domestic and foreign literature). He also had the management of the university library, was director of the institute for the deaf and dumb, and filled many educational and municipal offices.

In 1784, he founded a philological society, which grew into a philological seminary, superintended by him until his death. In 1808, he was made a Hofrath by the king of Saxony, and in 1820 a knight of the civil order of merit. His philological lectures, in which grammar and criticism were subordinated to history, were attended by hearers from all parts of Germany. He possessed a large and valuable library of 24,000 volumes.

He died at Leipzig on 13 December 1832.

== Works ==
He edited a number of classical authors:

- Albinovanus Pedo (1783)
- Pindar and the Scholia (1792–1795)
- Aristophanes (with Filippo Invernizzi and Wilhelm Dindorf, 1794, etc.)
- Euripides (1778–1788)
- Apollonius Rhodius (1797)
- Demosthenes De Pace (1799)
- Plato (1813–1819)
- Cicero (1795–1807)
- Titus Calpurnius Siculus (1803)

He translated Ferguson's Fall of the Roman Republic and Goldsmith's History of Greece, and added two volumes to Bauer's Thucydides. He also wrote on theological and historical subjects, and edited philological and bibliographical journals. Examples of his other works are:

- Anleitung zur Kenntnis der allgemeinen Welt- und Völkergeschichte (4 vols., 1787–1807)
- Commentarii Historici Decretorum Religionis Christianæ et Formulæ Lutheranæ (1801)
- Commentarii Societatis Philologicæ Lipsiensis (1801–04)

== Notes ==
- Rines, George Edwin, ed. (1920). "Beck, Christian Daniel" . Encyclopedia Americana.
- Gilman, D. C.; Peck, H. T.; Colby, F. M., eds. (1905). "Beck, Christian Daniel" . New International Encyclopedia (1st ed.). New York: Dodd, Mead.
- Friedrich August Eckstein (1875). "Beck, Christian Daniel". Allgemeine Deutsche Biographie (in German). Vol. 2. Leipzig: Duncker & Humblot. pp. 210–212.
- Johann August Heinrich Tittmann: Ad Christianum Danielem Beckium Vniversitatis Lipsiensis seniorem De mutationibus literarum ipso spectante adivvante ornante factis : epistola qua munus doctoris academici quinquagenarium auditorum pristinorum nomine. Leipzig, Staritz, 1829

Attribution:

- This work in turn cites:
  - Nobbe, Vita C. D. Beckii (1837)
  - G Hermann, Opuscula, v. 312
