= Journal of Maternal-Fetal and Neonatal Medicine =

- Discipline: Neonatology
- Language: English
- Edited by: Gian Carlo Di Renzo, Dev Maulik

Publication details
- Former names: Journal of Maternal-Fetal Medicine; Prenatal and Neonatal Medicine
- History: 1992–present
- Publisher: Informa Healthcare (United States)
- Frequency: Monthly
- Impact factor: 1.674 (2015)

Standard abbreviations
- ISO 4: J. Matern.-Fetal Neonatal Med.
- NLM: J Matern Fetal Neonatal Med

Indexing
- ISSN: 1476-7058 (print); 1476-4954 (web)

Links
- Journal homepage

The Journal of Maternal-Fetal and Neonatal Medicine is a peer-reviewed medical journal that covers obstetric, medical, genetic, mental health, and surgical complications of pregnancy and their effects on the mother, fetus, and neonate. Research on audit, evaluation, and clinical care in maternal-fetal and perinatal medicine is also featured. It is the official journal of the European Association of Perinatal Medicine, the Federation of Asia and Oceania Perinatal Societies, and the International Society of Perinatal Obstetricians.

== History ==
The journal was originally established as The Journal of Maternal-Fetal Medicine in 1992, under Wiley-Liss. A separate journal, Prenatal and Neonatal Medicine was established in 1996, published by the Parthenon Publishing Group. In 2002, both journal merged together to form the Journal of Maternal-Fetal and Neonatal Medicine. In 2001, Parthenon was acquired by CRC Press, which was itself acquired by Taylor & Francis in 2003, which became a subdivision of Informa in 2004.

== Editors ==
The Editors-in-Chief of the Journal of Maternal-Fetal and Neonatal Medicine are Gian Carlo Di Renzo (Santa Maria della Misericordia University Hospital, Perugia, Italy) and Dev Maulik (University of Missouri at Kansas City School of Medicine).
