= Anton Wilhelm Plaz =

German physician and botanist (1708–1784)

Anton Wilhelm Plaz (1 January 1708, Leipzig – 26 February 1784, Leipzig) was a German physician and botanist.

From 1723 he studied medicine at the universities of Leipzig and Halle, receiving his doctorate at the latter institution in 1728. In 1733 he became an associate professor of botany at Leipzig, where afterwards, he successively served as a full professor of botany (1749–54), physiology (1754–58), anatomy and surgery (1758), pathology (1758–73) and therapy (1773–84). From 1773 to 1784 he was dean to the medical faculty at the university. He was a member of the Römisch Kaiserlichen Akademie der Naturforscher.

== Selected works ==
- De corporis humani machina divinae sapientiae ac providentiae teste, 1725 (with Johann Christian Hebenstreit).
- De potus cofe abusu catalogum morborum, 1733 (respondent Johann Gottlieb Gleditsch).
- Foliorum in plantis historiam, 1740 (respondent Johann Andreas Ungebauer).
- De morbis ex oblectamentis, 1748 (respondent Johann Friedrich Hahn).
- De flore plantarum, 1749 (respondent Heinrich Otto Bosseck).
- De brutorum imaginatione, 1749.
- De plantarum plethora, 1754.
- De piis medicorum desideriis, 1772.
- De curatione per iniucunda, 1773.
