= Friedrich August Wilhelm Wenck =

German historian and teacher

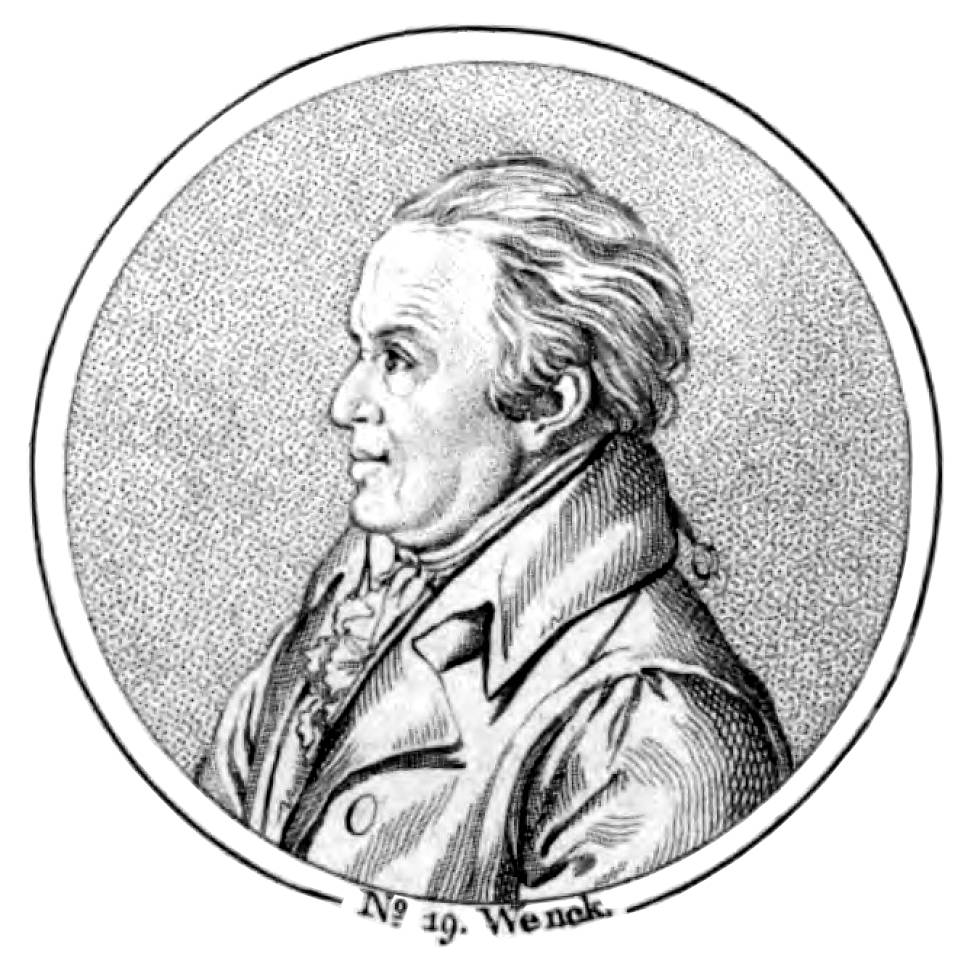
- Born: September 4, 1741; Idstein
- Died: June 15, 1810 (aged 68); Leipzig
- Occupation: Historian

Friedrich August Wilhelm Wenck (4 September 1741, in Idstein–15 June 1810, in Leipzig) was a German historian. His older brother, Helfrich Bernhard Wenck (1739–1803), was also a historian.

Beginning in 1760, he studied history at the University of Erlangen, then in 1766–68, he worked as an assistant at the Darmstadt Pädagogium. In 1770, he acquired the academic degree of magister of philosophy, and during the following year, became an associate professor of philosophy at the University of Leipzig. In 1780, he succeeded Johann Gottlob Böhme (1717–1780) as professor of history at Leipzig. Within a twenty-year period (1784–1804), on five occasions, he served as university rector. In 1799, he was named president of the Societas Jablonoviana.

== Published works ==
He is best remembered for his three-volume Codex juris gentium recentissimi (1781–95), an edition of international treatises from 1735 to 1772. In 1779, he published a German translation (with notes) of Edward Gibbon's History of the Decline and Fall of the Roman Empire (Geschichte Des Verfalls Und Untergangs Des Römischen Reichs). Other noteworthy written efforts by Wenck include:

- Entwurf der Geschichte der Oesterreichischen und Preußischen Staaten, Leipzig 1782–Outline on history of the Austrian and Prussian states.
- De Henrico I. Misniae et Lusatiae Marchione commentatio (several parts).
