= Christian August Crusius =

German philosopher and Protestant theologian (1716–1775)

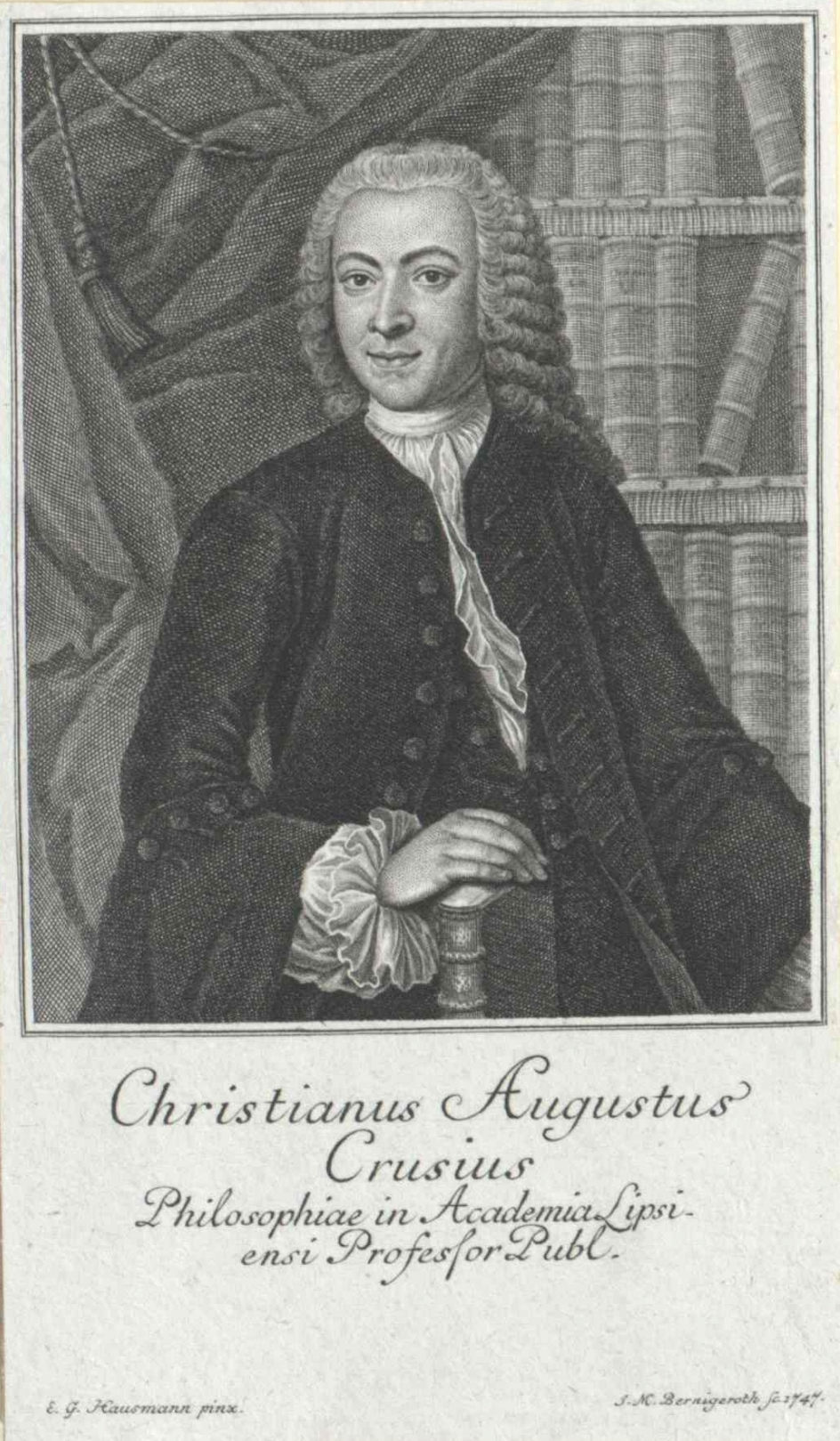
Christian August Crusius

Christian August Crusius (10 January 1715 – 18 October 1775) was a German philosopher and Protestant theologian.

== Biography ==
Crusius was born in Leuna in the Electorate of Saxony. He was educated at the University of Leipzig, and became extraordinary professor of theology there in 1744, ordinary professor in 1750, and senior (university officer) in 1773. He served as president of the university in 1755 and 1767.

Crusius first came to notice as an opponent of the philosophy of Gottfried Leibniz and Christian Wolff from the standpoint of religious orthodoxy. He attacked it mainly on the grounds of the moral evils that must flow from any system of determinism, and attempted to vindicate the freedom of the will. The most important works of this period of his life are Anweisung, vernünftig zu leben [Guide to Rational Living] (1744), Entwurf der nothwendigen Vernunftwahrheiten wiefern sie den zufälligen entgegengesetzt werden [Outline of the Necessary Truths of Reason, in so far as they are Opposed to Contingent Truths] (1745), Weg zur Gewissheit und Zuverlässigkeit der menschlichen Erkenntniss [Path to Certainty and Reliability in Human Knowledge] (1747), and Anleitung, über natürliche Begebenheiten ordentlich und vorsichtig nachzudenken [Instruction on How to Reflect Correctly and Cautiously on Natural Events] (1749). Crusius' philosophical books had a great but short-lived popularity. His criticism of Wolff influenced Immanuel Kant at the time when his system was forming; and his ethical, as well as epistemological, doctrines are cited in his 1755 doctoral thesis and the Critique of Practical Reason. Kant was both "deeply influenced by Crusius" and also explicitly refuted Crusius' characterization of Spirit in a footnote of his Prolegomena to Any Future Metaphysics: "Crusius alone thought of a compromise: that a Spirit, who can neither err nor deceive, implanted these laws in us originally. But since false principles often intrude themselves, as indeed the very system of this man shows in not a few examples, we are involved in difficulties as to the use of such a principle in the absence of sure criteria to distinguish the genuine origin from the spurious, as we never can know certainly what the Spirit of truth or the father of lies may have instilled into us." Kant also owned Anweisung, Entwurf, and Anleitung.

Crusius's later life was devoted to theology. He led the party in the university which became known as the "Crusianer" as opposed to the "Ernestianer," the followers of Johann August Ernesti. The two professors adopted opposite methods of exegesis. Ernesti wished to subject the Scripture in the same way as other ancient books; Crusius held firmly to orthodox ecclesiastical tradition.

He died in Leipzig.

== Philosophical work ==
Crusius's chief theological works are Hypomnemata ad theologiam propheticam (1764–78), and Kurzer Entwurf den Moraltheologie (Short Outline of Moral Theology; 1772–73); his most important philosophical work is Entwurf der notwendingen Venunftwahrheiten reprinted Darmstadt: Wissenschaftliche Buchgesellschaft, 1963. He opposed innovation in such matters as the accepted authorship of canonical writings, verbal inspiration, and the treatment of persons and events in the Old Testament as types of the New. His views have influenced later evangelical students of the Old Testament, such as Ernst Wilhelm Hengstenberg and Franz Delitzsch.

There is a full notice of Crusius in Ersch and Gruber's Allgemeine Encyclopädie. See also Johann Eduard Erdmann's History of Philosophy; Anton Marquardt, Kant und Crusius; and article in Herzog-Hauck, Realencyklopädie (1898).
