= Johann Christian Friedrich Tuch =

Johann Christian Friedrich Tuch (17 December 1806 – 12 April 1867) was a German Orientalist and theologian born in Quedlinburg.

He studied at the University of Halle, where in 1830 he received his habilitation. In 1838 he became an associate professor, later relocating to the University of Leipzig, where from 1844 to 1867, he was a full professor of theology and Oriental studies. In 1856–58 he served as university rector.

== Literary works ==
His best written work was Kommentar über die Genesis ("Commentary on the Genesis", 1838). Other noted works of his included treatises involving Nineveh (1845), the Ascension of Jesus (1857), Josephus (1859-1860) and Antonius Martyr (1864).

- Kommentar über die Genesis, Halle 1838.
- Commentationes geographicae, Leipzig 1845.
- De Nino urbe animadversiones tres, Leipzig 1845.
- Einundzwanzig Sinaitische Inschriften, Leipzig 1849.
- Antonius Martyr: seine Zeit und seine Pilgerfahrt nach dem Morgenlande, Leipzig 1864.
