= Johannes Sauer =

Personal information
- Nationality: Canada
- Born: 16 February 1968 (age 58) Johannesburg, Transvaal, South Africa
- Height: 1.76 m (5 ft 9 1/2 in)
- Weight: 80 kg (176 lb)

Sport
- Sport: Shooting
- Event: 50 m rifle prone (FR60PR)
- Club: SCMRA
- Coached by: Saul Miller

Johannes Sauer (born 16 February 1968 in Johannesburg, South Africa) is a South African-born Canadian sport shooter. He is a two-time Canadian shooting champion, and a gold medalist for the rifle prone at the 2005 Championships of the Americas in Salinas, California.

Sauer represented his adopted country of Canada at the 2008 Summer Olympics in Beijing, where he competed in the men's 50 m rifle prone. He finished only in forty-fourth place by one point behind South Korea's Park Bong-Duk from the fifth attempt, for a total score of 587 targets.
