= Johann Martin Chladenius =

German philosopher

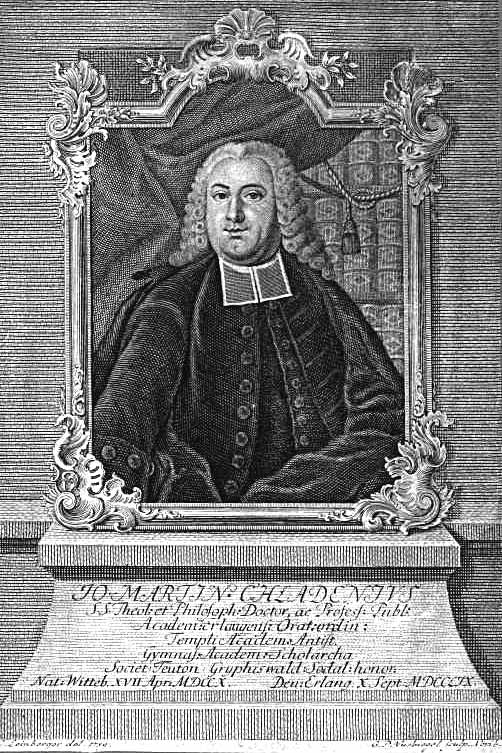
Johann Martin Chladenius

Johann Martin Chladni (Latinized Chladenius; Lutherstadt Wittenberg, 17 April 1710 – Erlangen, 10 September 1759) was a German philosopher, theologian, and historian, who is seen as one of the founders of Hermeneutics.

== Life ==
He was the son of Martin Chladenius (1669–1725), a professor of theology at Wittenberg University. He attended the Casimirianum Gymnasium in Coburg and enrolled in 1731, at the Wittenberg University, where he received his master's degree in philosophy, and taught after his studies. He went to the University of Leipzig, where he became an associate professor of church antiquities in 1742.

In 1743 he took over the management of the Casimirianum in Coburg and was appointed full professor of theology, rhetoric, and poetry at the University of Erlangen in 1747, where he received his doctorate in theology during the same year. Although he was not originally trained as a historian, he nevertheless made a name for himself with his philosophically sound and pragmatic didactic theory of history.

As a theologian, he orientated himself towards Lutheran orthodoxy, which he sought to combine with the rationalism of Christian Wolff and empiricism. In historiography, he was the first to interpret historical sources according to a hermeneutic method. He opposed the representatives of historical Pyrrhonism and introduced the concept of the “viewpoint”, from which historical reality could be viewed from multiple perspectives. With this interpretative approach, Chladni is regarded as one of the first methodologists of hermeneutics and modern historical research.

== Works ==
- De sententiis et libris sententiosis, Leipzig 1741.
- Einleitung zur richtigen Auslegung vernünftiger Reden und Schriften, Leipzig 1742.
- Logica practica, 1742.
- Logica sacra, 1745.
- Vernünftige Gedanken von dem Wahrscheinlichen und desselben gefährlichen Mißbrauche, 1748 [ND: Waltrop 1989].
- Kleine Sammlung von Betrachtungen, Erlangen 1749.
- Opuscula academica varii generis, Leipzig 1750.
- Nova philosophia definitiva, Leipzig 1750.
- Allgemeine Geschichtswissenschaft, worinnen der Grund zu einer neuen Einsicht in allen Arten der Gelahrtheit gelegt wird, Leipzig 1752.
- Allgemeine Geschichtswissenschaft. Neudruck der Ausgabe Leipzig 1752. Introduction by Christoph Friedrich and foreword by Reinhart Koselleck. Böhlau, Wien 1985.
- Wöchentliche biblische Untersuchungen …, Erlangen 1754.
- Theologische Nachforscher …, Erlangen 1757.
