= Christian Gottlieb Ludwig =

German physician and botanist (1709–1773)

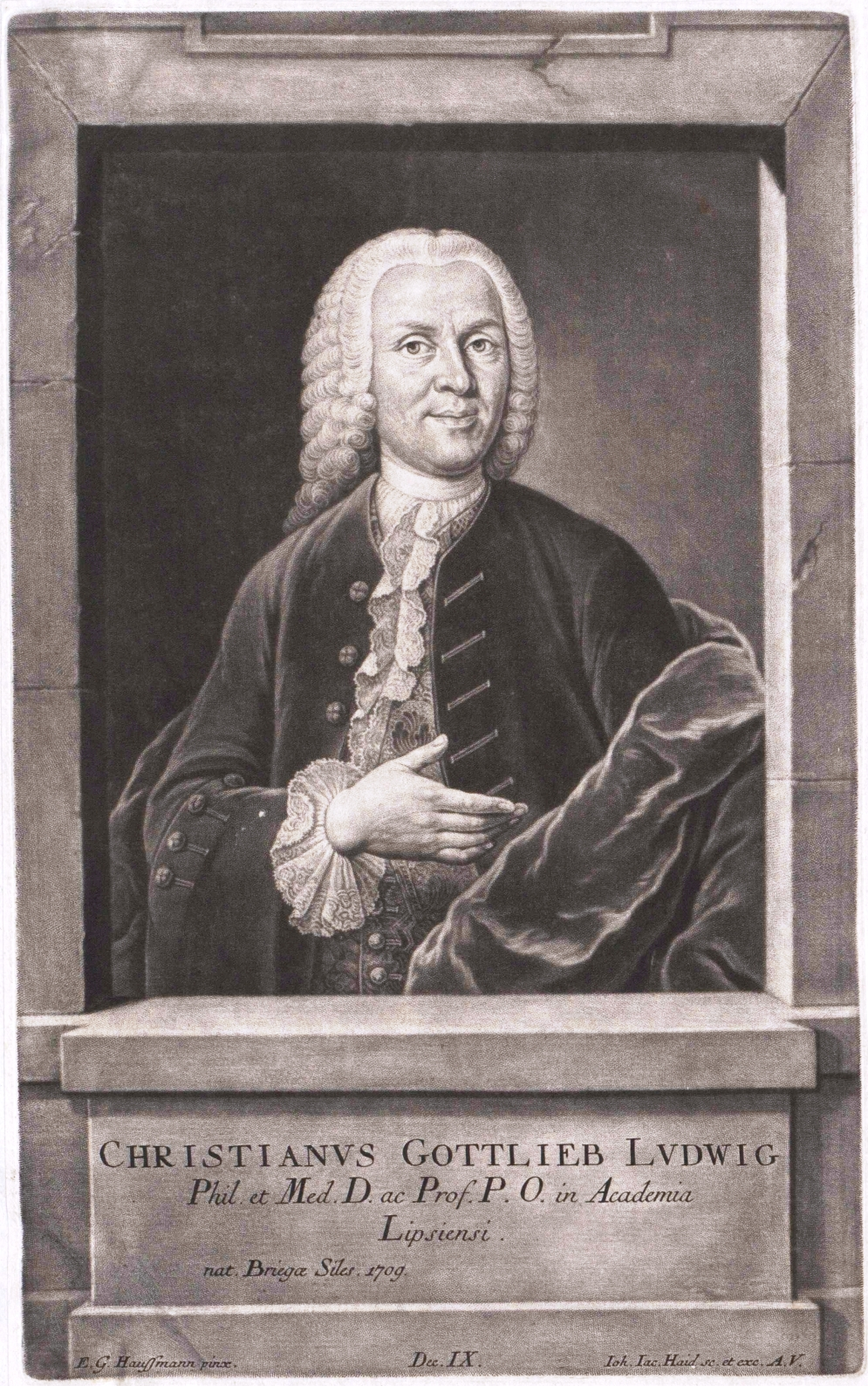
- Born: 30 April 1709; Brzeg, Silesia, Kingdom of Bohemia, Holy Roman Empire
- Died: 7 May 1773 (aged 64); Leipzig, Electorate of Saxony, Holy Roman Empire
- Scientific career
- Fields: Physics; Botany
- Doctoral advisor: Augustin Friedrich Walther
- Doctoral students: Johann Carl Gehler

Christian Gottlieb Ludwig (30 April 1709 – 7 May 1773) was a German physician and botanist born in Brieg, Silesia (now Brzeg, Poland). He was the father of physician/naturalist Christian Friedrich Ludwig (1757–1823) and of Christian L. Ludwig (1749–1784), a physician/scientist known for his translation of Joseph Priestley's scientific experiments.

From 1728 he studied medicine and botany at the University of Leipzig, but due to lack of funds was forced to discontinue his studies, therefore taking a job as a botanist on an African expedition under the leadership of Johann Ernst Hebenstreit (1703–1757). In 1733 he resumed his studies, and from 1736 gave lectures at Leipzig. In 1737 he earned his doctorate under Augustin Friedrich Walther (1688–1746), later becoming an associate professor of medicine (1740). At Leipzig he successively became a full professor of medicine (1747), pathology (1755), and therapy (1758). Among his better known students at Leipzig was physician and mineralogist Johann Carl Gehler (1732–1796).

Ludwig is remembered for his correspondence with Carl Linnaeus, in particular, discussions involving the latter's classification system. It was Linnaeus who named the plant genus Ludwigia in honor of Ludwig.

== Selected publications ==
- De vegetatione plantarum marinarum (1736)
- De sexu plantarum (dissertation - 1737)
- Institvtiones historico-physicae regni vegetabilis in usum auditorum adornatae... (1742)
- Institutiones medicinae clinicae praelectionibus academicis accomodatae (1758)
- Of lumbricis intestina perforantibus (1761)
- Ectypa vegetabilium (1760–1764)
- Adversaria medico-practica (three volumes 1769–1773)
- Commentarii of rebus in scientia naturali and medicina gestis (Journal 1752–1806, co-author)
- Anleitung zur rechtlichen Arzeneikunde : nach der zwoten vermehrten Ausgabe des Herrn Ernest Gottlob Bosens übersetzt. Leipzig : Gleditsch, 1779. Digital edition of the University and State Library Düsseldorf.
