= Christian Friedrich Ludwig =

German physician and naturalist (1757–1823)

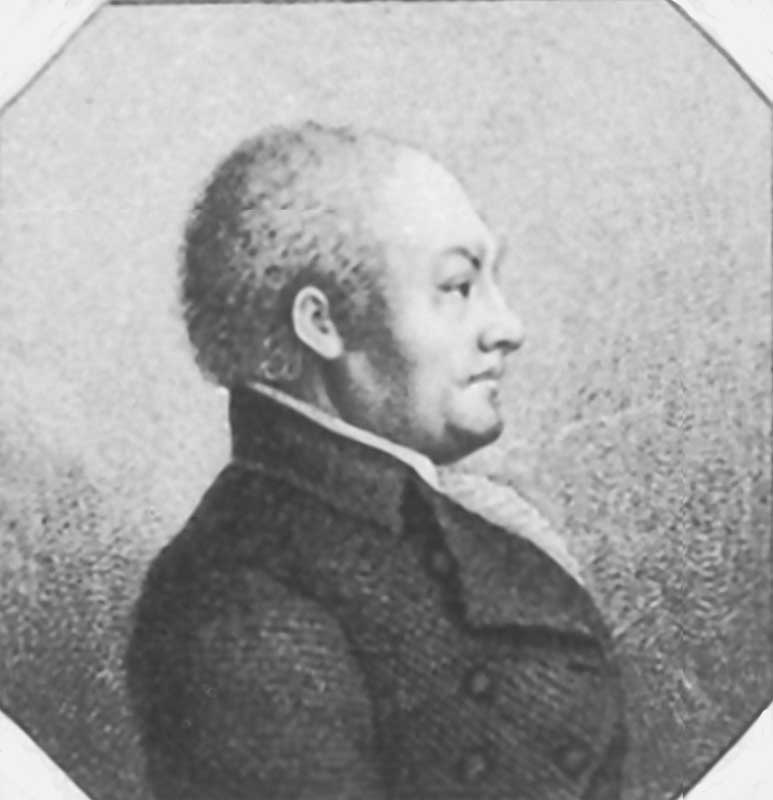
Christian Friedrich Ludwig (1809)

Christian Friedrich Ludwig (19 May 1757 in Leipzig – 8 July 1823 in Leipzig) was a German medical doctor and naturalist. He was the son of botanist Christian Gottlieb Ludwig (1709–1773).

He studied medicine at the University of Leipzig, where in 1779 he obtained his habilitation. In 1780/81 he took a study trip to southern Germany, Switzerland, France, the Netherlands and England. Afterwards in Leipzig, he became an associate professor of medicine (1782) and natural history (1787). In 1796 he was named a full professor of pathology, and he later attained professorships in therapy and materia medica (from 1812) and surgery (from 1820). On two separate occasions he served as rector at the University of Leipzig (1801/02) and 1807/08).

== Selected works ==
- Primae lineae anatomiae pathologicae, Leipzig 1785.
- Scriptores neurologici minores selecti, 1791
- Historiae insitionis variolarum humanarum et vaccinarum comparatio, 16 parts, Leipzig 1803-1823.
- Handbuch der Mineralogie nach A.G. Werner, 1803 – Handbook of mineralogy according to Abraham Gottlob Werner.
- Einleitung in die Bücherkunde der praktischen Medizin, Leipzig 1806 – Introduction to scientific practical medicine.
- De artis obstetriciae in academia et civitate Lipsiensi incrementis, Leipzig 1811.
- De nosogenia in vasculis minimis, 5 volumes, Leipzig 1809-1819.
