= Andreas Rüdiger =

German philosopher and physicist (1673–1731)

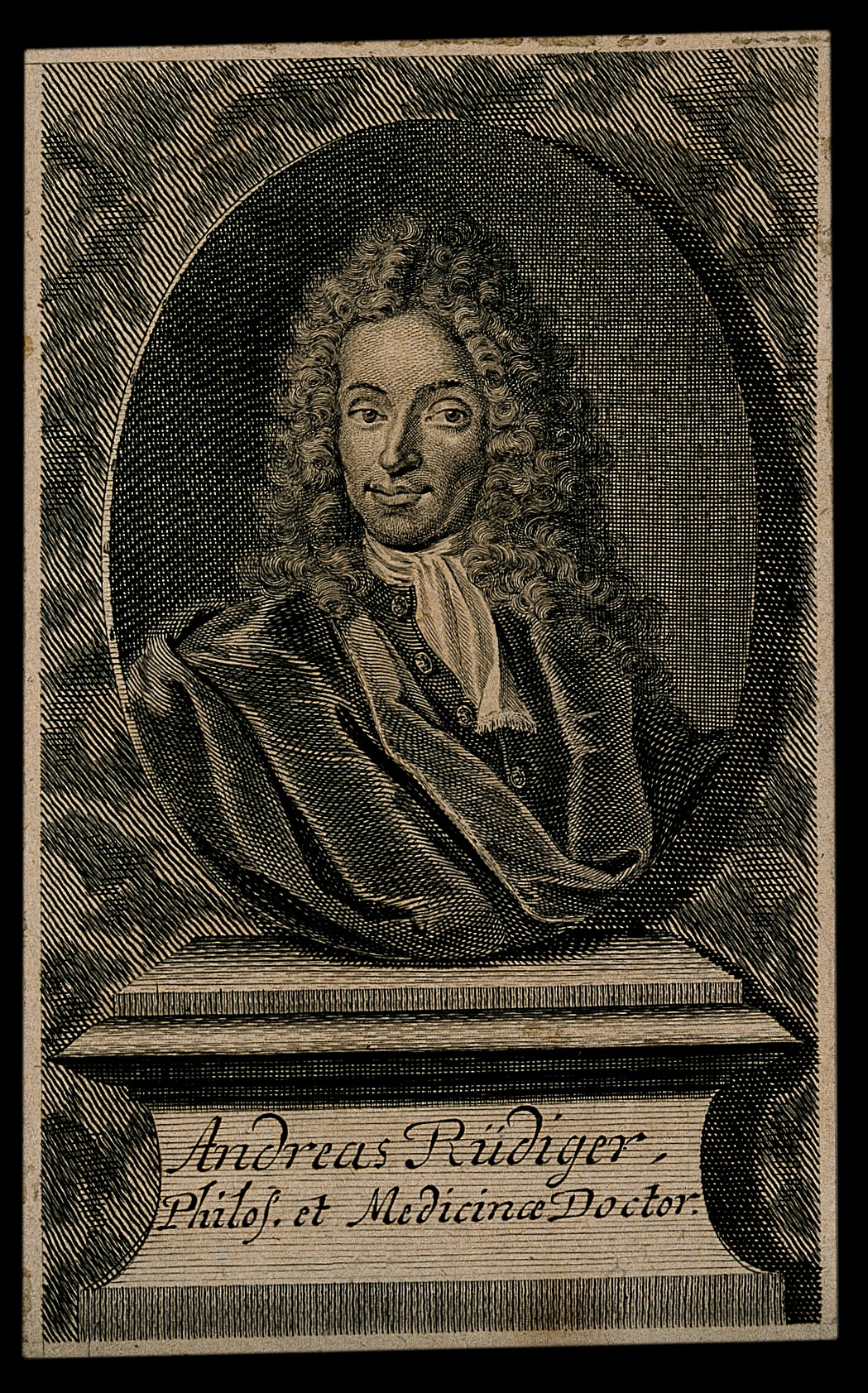
Johann Andreas Rüdiger

Johann Andreas Rüdiger (1 November 1673, Rochlitz – 6 June 1731, Leipzig) was a German philosopher and physicist. He was a student of Christian Thomasius.

== Main works ==
- 1707: Philosophia synthetica
- 1709, 1722: De sensu veri et falsi
- 1711, 1717, 1718: Institutiones eruditionis (= Institutiones philosophiae systematicae)
- 1716: Physica divina
- 1717: Obiectiones contra Physicam divinam... cum notis Auctoris Physicae divinae
- 1723, 1729: Philosophia pragmatica
