= Gottlieb Gerhard Titius =

German jurist (1661–1714)

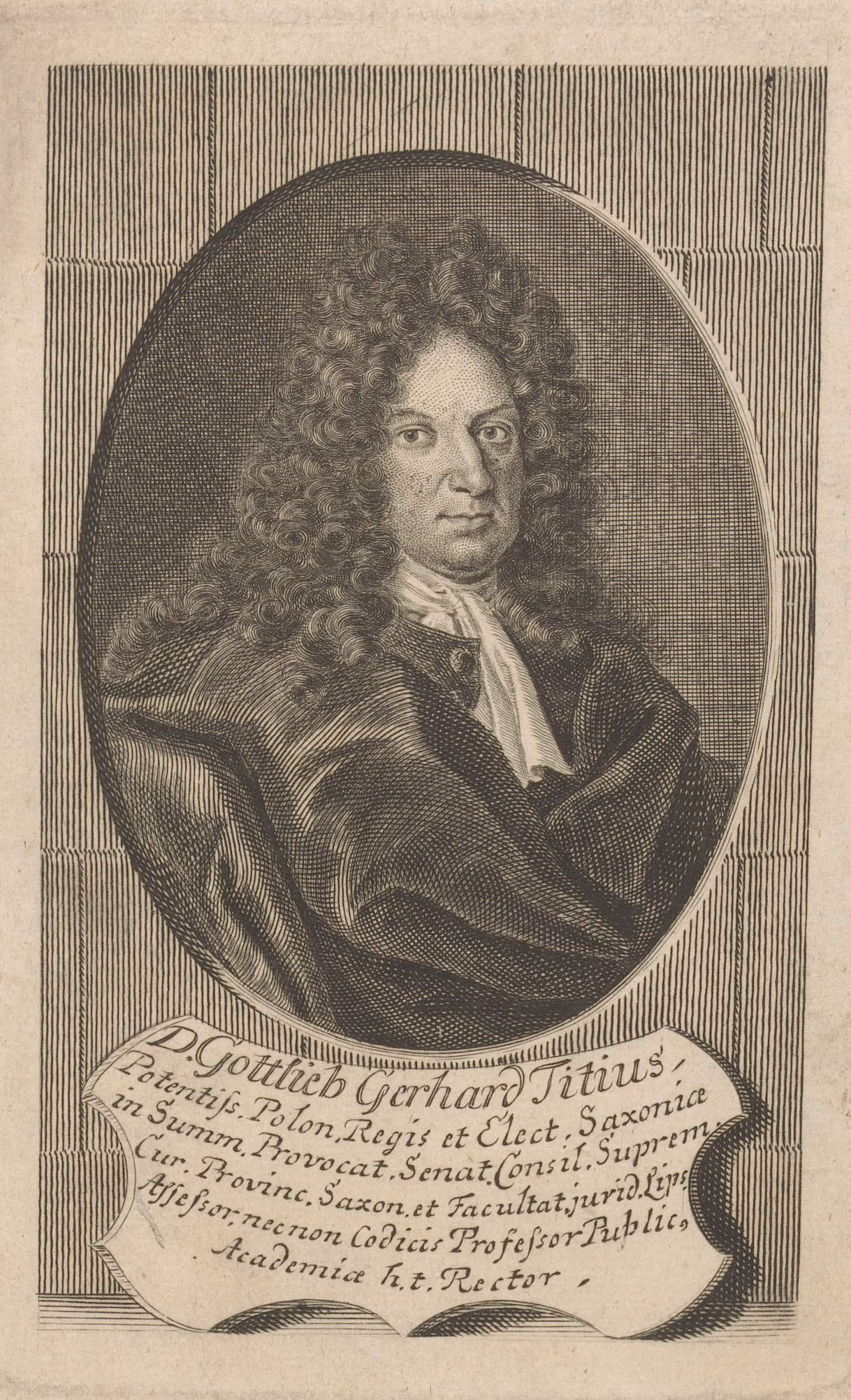
1713 engraving of Titius by Martin Bernigeroth

Gottlieb Gerhard Titius (5 June 1661 – 10 April 1714) was a German jurist.

Gottlieb Gerhard Titius was born on 5 June 1661 in Nordhausen, Thuringia, and died on 10 April 1714 in Leipzig.

Titius taught Roman law at Leipzig University, where he was on the faculty from 1688. He edited De jure naturae et gentium, a treatise by Samuel von Pufendorf, and wrote a commentary on De officio by Pufendorf.

Christian Thomasius was his teacher.

Titius's work influenced Jean Barbeyrac.

== Works ==
- Specimen juris publici Romano-Germanici (1698)
- Observationes in Pufendorfii libros de officiis hominis et civis (1703)
- Jus privatum Romano German (1709)

== Works cited ==
- Fitzmaurice, Andrew (2014). Sovereignty, Property and Empire, 1500–2000. Cambridge University Press. pp. 125–170. doi:10.1017/cbo9781139924306.005. ISBN 978-1-139-92430-6.
