= Karl Gottlob Kühn =

German physician and medical historian (1754–1840)

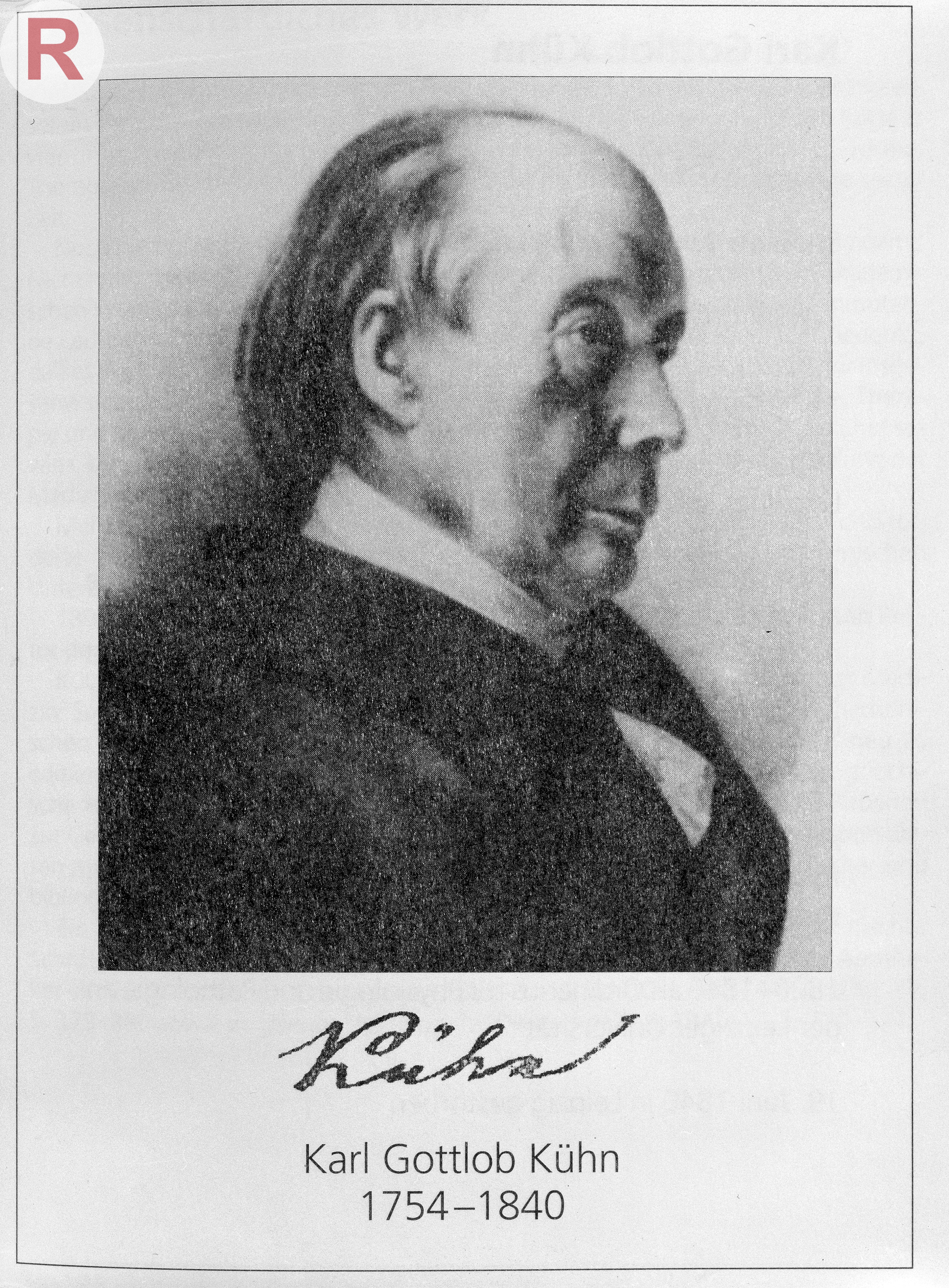
Karl Gottlob Kühn (1754–1840)

Karl Gottlob Kühn (12 July 1754, in Spergau – 19 June 1840, in Leipzig) was a German medical doctor and medical historian.

He studied medicine at the University of Leipzig, earning his doctorate in 1783 with the dissertation thesis "De forcibus obstetriciis nuper inventis". In 1785 he became an associate professor at Leipzig, where he later served as a full professor of therapy (from 1802) and physics and pathology (from 1820). On three occasions he served as university rector (1805/06, 1809/10 and 1813/14).

Known as an editor of works by ancient physicians, he published editions of Aretaeus of Cappadocia, Hippocrates and Galen, of whom he issued the acclaimed "Claudii Galeni opera omnia", which was published in twenty volumes between 1821 and 1833. He was also the author of books associated with more recent physicians — he translated works by William Hunter (1784 f.), Thomas Beddoes (1803, 1810) and Charles Bell (1822), and edited works by Thomas Sydenham (1826) and Giorgio Baglivi (1827-28). He is also credited with publishing an edition of Stephan Blancard's "Lexicon medicum" (1832 f.).

As a physician, his interests included the use of electricity as it pertained to therapy, smallpox vaccine, obstetrics and food poisoning. He was co-editor of the "Neuen Sammlung der auserlesensten und neuesten Abhandlungen für Wundärzte" (1782–89), the new "Leipziger Literaturzeitung" (from 1803) and the "Magazins der neuesten Erfindungen, Entdeckungen und Verbesserungen" (from 1808).
