= Johann Samuel Heinsius =

German bookseller and publisher

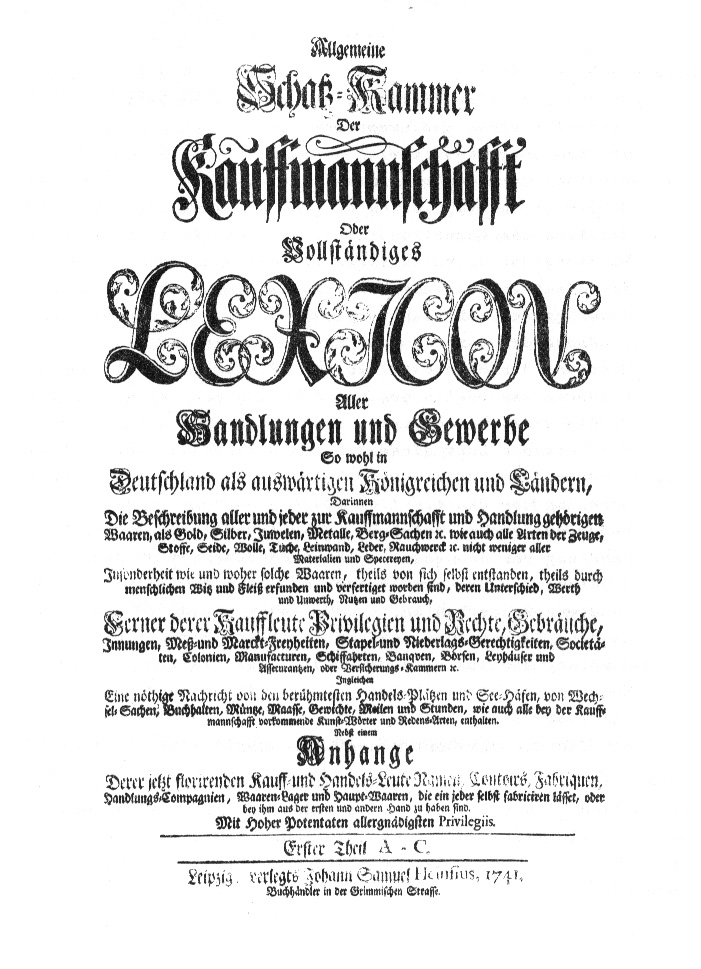
Cover of the first volume of the General Treasure Chamber, published by Heinsius

Johann Samuel Heinsius (1686–1750) was a German bookseller and publisher based in Leipzig, Electorate of Saxony. He is best known for the works he published in collaboration with Johann Heinrich Zedler.

Heinsius founded his firm, also named Heinsius, in Leipzig in 1725. After Zedler, publisher of the Grosses vollständiges Universal-Lexicon, had lost control of his firm to Johann Heinrich Wolf around 1735, he became interested in new projects and began to collaborate with Heinsius. In 1740, a number of Zedler's products appeared under the Heinsius name, starting with a relaunch of Zedler's Cabinet magazine, under a slightly altered title. It is not known how successful the new magazine was, or why Heinsius included it in his publishing program since from 1739 he already had a similar monthly magazine under the title of Genealogical and historical messages of the principal events of the European courts.

In 1741, there followed the first volume of the General Treasure Chamber, a four-volume commercial lexicon translated by Carl Günther Ludovici from the Dictionnaire Universel de Commerce (General Commercial Dictionary) by Jacques Savary des Brûlons. The partners' next publishing project was the Corpus Juris Cambialis (Stock Exchange Laws) of Johann Gottlieb Siegel. Heinsius advertised the two-volume publication in the newspapers in April 1742, seeking Praenumeration subscribers. Both volumes were ready in time for the Leipzig Michaelmas Fair that year.

After the Treasury Board and the Corpus Juris Cambialis, Zedler and Heinsius again began a major publishing project. The basis for Heinsius's Historical and Political-Geographic Atlas of the whole world was a translation of the Grand Dictionnaire Géographique Et Critique of Antoine-Augustin Bruzen de La Martinière. The German version ran to 13 volumes, published by Heinsius between 1744 and 1749. The Heinsius catalog issued in 1748 listed 14,000 titles. The subjects included science, philosophy, biography and literature. Most of the books were 18th-century works in German or Latin, but there were many translations of English, French and Latin works.

Heinsius died in December 1750, and his company became known as "Johann Samuel Heinsius heirs". His son, Johann Samuel Heinsius the Younger (1734–1807), continued with the firm and was followed by his grandson Johann Wilhelm Heinsius (1768–1817).
