= Johann Heinrich Zedler =

Bookseller and publisher

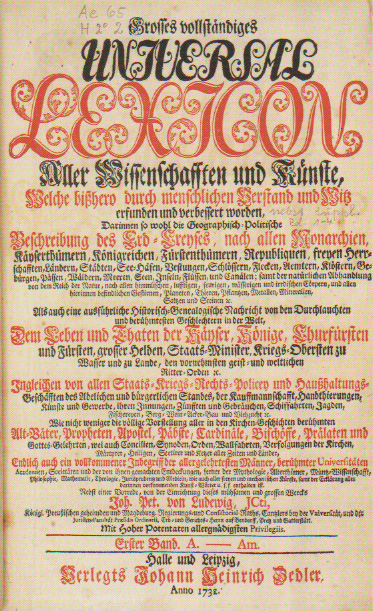
Zedler's Universal-Lexicon is considered the most important German-language encyclopedia of the 18th Century. Contrary to the claim on the title page shown here, the first volume had already appeared at the Leipzig Michaelmas Fair of 1731.

Johann Heinrich Zedler (7 January 1706 in Breslau (now Wrocław, Poland) – 21 March 1751 in Leipzig) was a bookseller and publisher. His most important achievement was the creation of a German encyclopedia, the Grosses Universal-Lexicon (Great Universal Lexicon), the largest and most comprehensive German-language encyclopedia developed in the 18th century.

After training as a bookseller, Zedler founded his own publishing house in 1726. It was initially based in Freiberg, Upper Saxony, and in 1727 moved to the Publishing and Book Trade Center in Leipzig. His first major publication was an eleven volume edition of the writings of Martin Luther published between 1729 and 1734, with an index volume published in 1740. As the founding publisher of the Universal-Lexicon, started in 1731 and during his lifetime growing to a total of 64 volumes, Zedler got into a long-standing legal dispute with the established publishers in Leipzig, whose more specialized products were threatened.

Some time before the spring of 1737, Zedler suffered a financial collapse. His business was bought by the Leipzig businessman Johann Heinrich Wolf. Wolf provided funding for Zedler to continue with the Universal-Lexicon and other works he had already begun such as the General Chronicle of States, Wars, Churches and Scholarship (1733–1754, 22 volumes). Zedler also published new works such as the trade lexicon Allgemeine Schatz-Kammer Der Kaufmannschafft (1741–1743, 4 volumes and 1 supplement volume), stock exchange laws Corpus Juris Cambialis (Johann Gottlieb Siegels, 1742, 2 volumes) and the Historical-Political-Geographical Atlas of the Whole World (1744–1749, 13 volumes), published under the name of the Leipzig bookseller, Johann Samuel Heinsius the Elder.

Zedler died at the age of 45 in 1751, just a year after the conclusion of the alphabetic Universal-Lexicon. His name lives on with the colloquial name of the encyclopedia, which is known today as "the Zedler".

== Early years ==
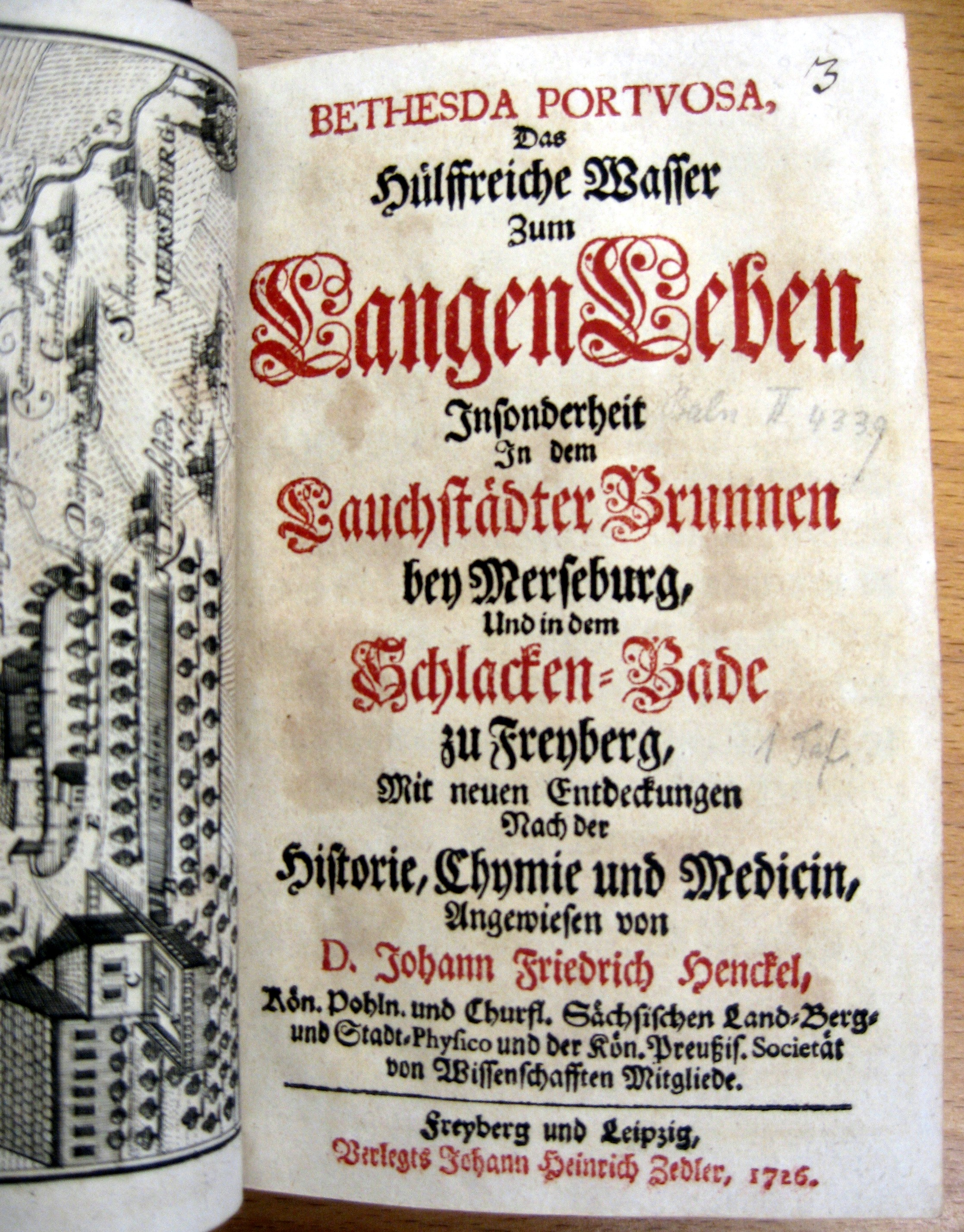
Early works published by Zedler

Johann Heinrich Zedler was born in 1706 in Breslau, the son of a shoemaker, and presumably did not have higher secondary education – if he attended school at all. He was an apprentice with the Breslau booksellers Brachvogel, then moved to the company of the Hamburg bookseller and publisher Theodor Christoph Felginer. In 1726 he moved to the Saxon town of Freiberg, and in September that year married Christiana Dorothea Richter (1695–1755), sister of publisher David Richter and daughter of a reputable merchant in the city, who was eleven years his elder. He used his wife's dowry to open a bookshop in Freiberg. Zedler only stayed in Freiberg for a short time since the mining town did not provide a sufficient market for books.

== Independent bookseller and publisher in Leipzig ==
=== First major publishing project ===
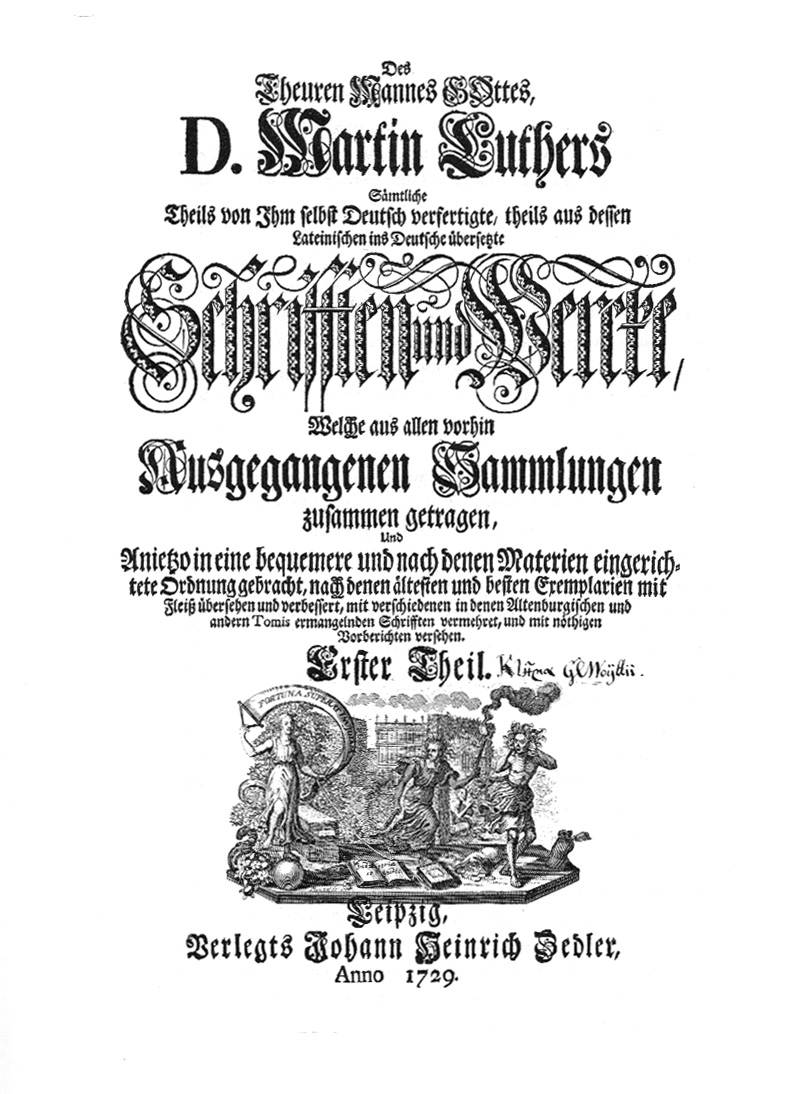
Zedler's first major publishing project: The dear man of God, Martin Luther. Title page of the first volume, Leipzig 1729.

In 1727, Zedler and his wife moved to the university and trade fair city of Leipzig. That year his name appeared in a list of sixteen publishing booksellers in Leipzig. In September, Zedler announced his first published works after moving to Leipzig. The ad appeared just before the Leipzig Michaelmas Fair in October and was aimed at the many visitors to the city for this event.

Early in 1728 Zedler published a notice of "A New Enlarged and Revised Edition of All the German Journals and Works of the Blessed Luther". Unlike the previous work by theologian Johann Gottlieb Pfeiffer, Zedler's book did not follow a chronological sequence, but organized the material around themes. This was the first of seven volumes of work designed for high school use. The work was financed through Praenumeration, a common practice at the time. Interested parties would pay for two sections in advance at the Easter Fair in 1728, with a discount, and then receive delivery at the following Michaelmas Fair in early October. Zedler offered a particularly attractive price, making reprint by other booksellers unprofitable.

Since Zedler could not expect to raise enough funds for publication in this way, he also took a loan of 2,665 thalers from his brother-in-law David Richter. It is clear that this was a time of considerable uncertainty. Although Zedler had committed to publication on October 1728, as a precaution the year 1729 was printed on the title page. However, he met the deadline and fourteen days before the fair announced that the book was ready and no new subscribers to the Praenumeration plan would be accepted. Within a year Zedler had built a viable publishing business based on the success of the Luther series.

Each volume in this series, as well as those of later published works, was dedicated by Zedler to high notables according to the practice of the time. The person named in the dedicatory preface and depicted with an engraved portrait often responded with a financial gift or an honorary title. The first such title was given to Zedler by Christian, Duke of Saxe-Weissenfels, to whom he dedicated the first and third volumes of Luther's writings. The Duke was an important supporter of the Protestant church and also a great hunting enthusiast. Zedler presented the first book to the Duke in person on his birthday.

=== Announcement of the Universal-Lexicon ===
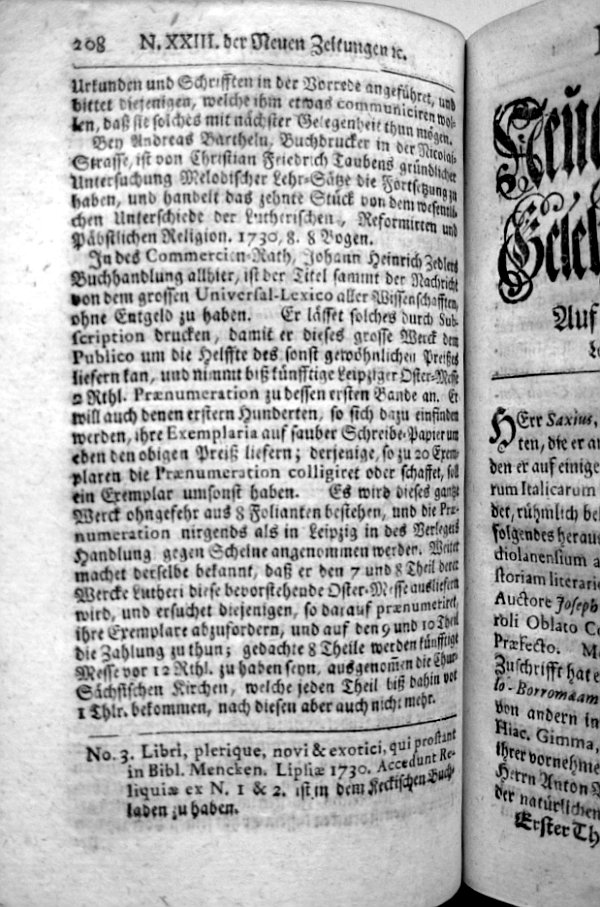
Zedler announced on 26 March 1730 his plan to print a large universal lexicon of all the sciences, seeking Praenumeration subscriptions.

On 26 March 1730 Zedler announced the seventh and eighth volumes of Luther's works in the journal New Learned Works, and also announced his next project: the Great Complete Universal Lexicon of Science and Art, with the first volume to be available through Praenumeration subscriptions.

Zedler intended to summarize many previously available reference works on various fields of knowledge into a single large work of reference. The plan was a challenge to the established publishers of Leipzig. For example, Johann Friedrich Gleditsch had published a household lexicon in 1704, and with its third edition of 1708 this had become a form of encyclopedia. Thomas Fritsch had published the General Historical Lexicon in 1709, the German-language equivalent of Le Grand Dictionnaire historique of Louis Moréri, a multi-volume project with contributions from specialist writers and scientists. In 1721, Johann Theodor Jablonski published a General Lexicon of Arts and Science. A series of small reference books and dictionaries for the public completed the range. All these works were now threatened by Zedler's project.

The first public reaction from an established Leipzig publisher came five weeks after Zedler's notice. Caspar Fritsch, son of Thomas Fritsch (who had died in 1726), was concerned about the effect on sales of the General Historical Lexicon, whose third edition was being prepared. He announced special pricing, and stressed the security of subscriptions to his established work.

=== Bid for copyright protection ===
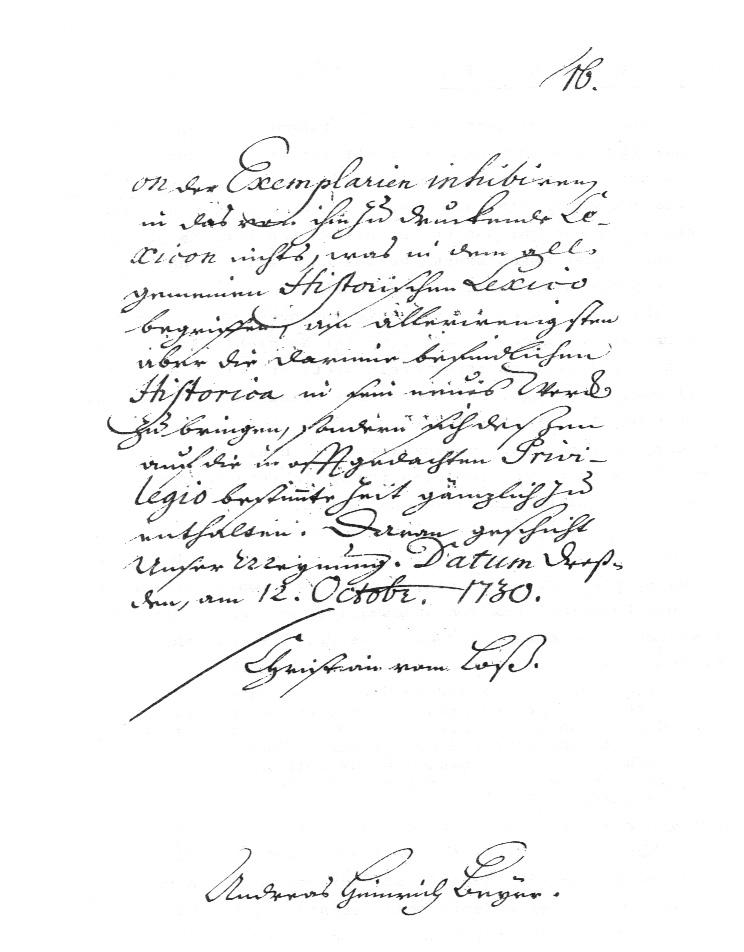
Last log page of the order against Zedler, rejecting his request for privilege, Leipzig, 12 October 1730

On 13 September 1730 Zedler requested a Saxon printing privilege to protect the lexicon, which was advertised for the 1731 Easter Fair. These national privileges typically covered a period of five to ten years, and gave the original printer protection against foreign reprints during this time. The Leipzig Book Commission, which was responsible for granting such privileges, followed the normal process of posting an explanation of the print project and the privilege request for a week in all the bookstores of the city, during which period objections could be filed with the courts.

Both Caspar Fritsch and Johann Gottlieb Gleditsch, son of Johann Friedrich Gleditsch, raised objections. Fritsch argued that in 1724 his father had gained the Saxon privilege for the General Historical Lexicon with a ten-year term, and said that the Universal-Lexicon would not differ in content from this and other existing lexicons apart from paraphrasing. On 16 October 1730, the Upper Consistory in Dresden agreed with the arguments of Fritsch and Gleditsch, rejected Zedler's request, and warned that he would be subject to confiscation and a fine of 300 thalers if he reproduced any material from the General Historical Lexicon in his Universal-Lexicon. With this ruling, Zedler lost the first round in his dispute with the competing Leipzig publishers.

=== Continuation of the Leipzig "publishers war" ===
Despite the decision of the Dresden court, Zedler continued with his project. On 19 October 1730 he informed the Leipzig journal New Learned Works that he was still accepting further Praenumeration subscriptions, and rejected all accusations of plagiarism. He said that the Universal-Lexicon was being written by learned and distinguished men who had no need to plagiarize, but could write the material from their own knowledge.

Zedler went on to say that he would not be deterred by envious enemies, but would bring out further important works. This referred to his latest publishing project, a General Chronicle of States, Wars, Religion and Scholarship. Zedler could rely on the support of Jacob August Franckenstein, a professor of natural and international law at the University of Leipzig, and was a friend of the publisher of New Learned Works, Johann Burckhardt Mencke. On 24 October 1730, Zedler sent the Council of the City of Leipzig a preprint of the proposed title page, but this time without the privilege claim.

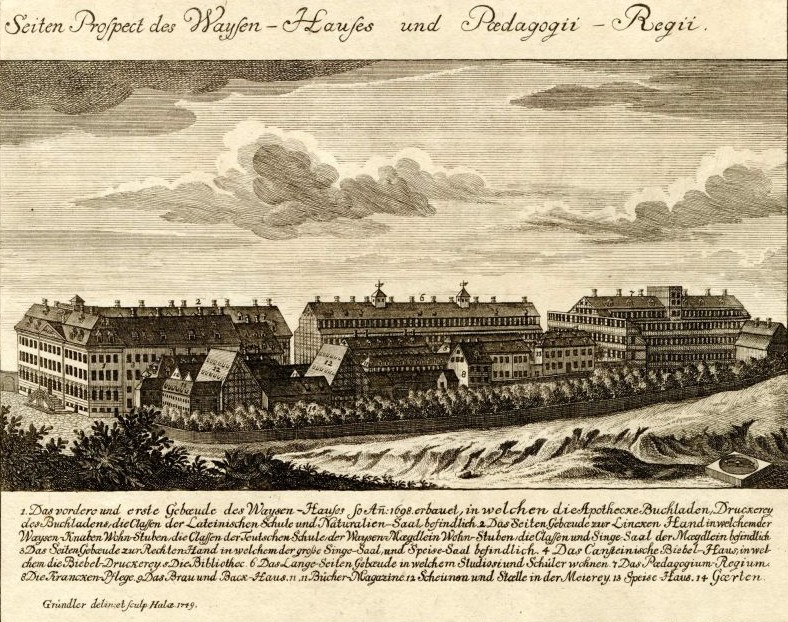
In response to the Leipzig order, Zedler moved production of the Universal-Lexicon to the press of August Hermann Francke, who founded the orphanage in Halle.

Again, the local publishers protested, and the Leipzig Book Commission finally ordered Zedler to halt printing of the Universal-Lexicon and the Chronicle and to stop advertising these works. In addition, the court ordered Zedler to print and distribute its verdict or pay a penalty of 100 thalars. With the Universal-Lexicon in jeopardy, Zedler shifted production to neighboring Prussia. In Halle he was in contact with Johann Peter von Ludewig, a lawyer and the local University Chancellor. Ludewig was also senior staff member of the Council for the orphanage in Halle. Apparently he caused the orphanage to be assigned to Zedler for printing the Universal-Lexicon. Before this started, Zedler requested a royal Prussian printing privilege, and at the same time an Imperial privilege. He received the imperial privilege on 6 April 1731 from Charles VI, and the Prussian royal privilege only four days later.

=== Completion and seizure of the first volume of the encyclopedia ===
Zedler could not meet the planned Easter 1731 delivery date for the first volume of the Lexicon. He therefore announced in an advertisement in New Learned Works on 15 April 1731 that the work would be ready for the Michaelmas Fair in October. He also announced that he was appointed and protected by the Prussian King and Elector of Brandenburg, Frederick William I.

Jacob August Franckenstein was editor of the first volume, and Johann Peter von Ludewig wrote the preface. It is only possible to guess at other authors who contributed to this and all subsequent volumes. Ulrich Johannes Schneider, an expert on Zedler and director of the Leipzig University Library, says that anonymity – at least at this early stage of the enterprise – was a deliberate strategy. Zedler kept the names of his employees secret to protect against lawsuits on theft of intellectual property. In his preface to the first volume of the lexicon, von Ludewig said that the Lexicon was entirely the work of Zedler's "nine muses", and that their names would be disclosed when the work was complete. This promise was not subsequently observed, and Schneider considers it highly questionable that there were nine authors. In any case, Schneider says that the appearance of the first volume was the start of "Europe's largest Encyclopedia project of the 18th Century".

=== Compromise, libel, renewed printing ban and exit of Franckenstein ===
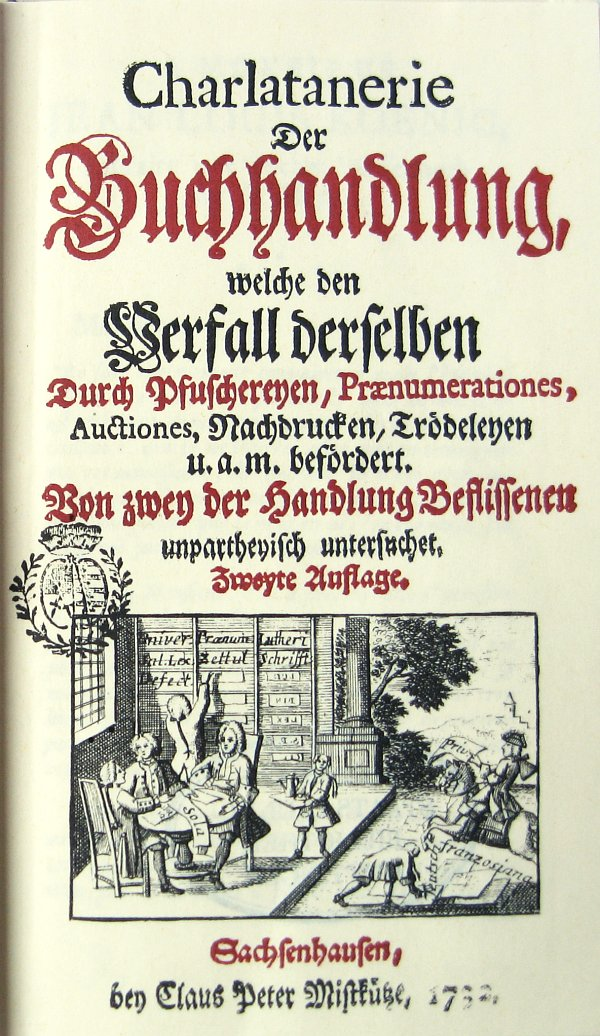
Cover of 1732 pamphlet on charlatanism of the bookstore

The local Leipzig publishers were quick to react. During the Michaelmas Fair 1731 the Leipzig Book Commission ordered the seizure of all previously printed and undelivered copies. Zedler protested against the seizure, but the Commission maintained its verdict. The publisher turned to the Dresden Upper Consistory and achieved a partial success. In its decision of 14 December 1731 the court gave him permission to supply his Praenumeration subscribers with books that had been printed outside the Electorate of Saxony. This compromise allowed Zedler to continue book production, although transport added costs.

A pamphlet lampooning the "charlatanism" of the bookstore appeared at this time. Almost ninety pages long, it takes the form of a dialog between two merchants at the 1731 Leipzig Michaelmas Fair. The two men talk of the injustices of the book trade, allege that Zedler engaged in sharp practices and fraud, say that he lacks finance and accuse his authors of stupidity. They say of Johann Peter von Ludewig that nobody knew where he obtained his title and his fortune. Zedler's response to this libel is not known, but on 11 February 1732 Ludewig offered a reward for discovery of the author.

Zedler's opponents did not give up. They went back to the Upper Consistory in Dresden, and demanded payment of the penalty of 300 thalers imposed in October 1730. On 10 March 1732 the court asked for a new report from the Leipzig Book Commission, which responded with an 87-page list of allegations of plagiarism from Zedler's opponents. On 24 April the court ruled that Zedler must pay the fine of 300 thalers and banned him from further printing within Saxony. On 26 October 1732 Zedler suffered another blow. Jacob August Franckenstein publicly announced that he would have no more to do with Zedler's publications. Two months later, on 10 May 1733, Franckenstein died. After his death, Paul Daniel Longolius assumed the editorship of the Universal-Lexicon.

=== The company falters ===
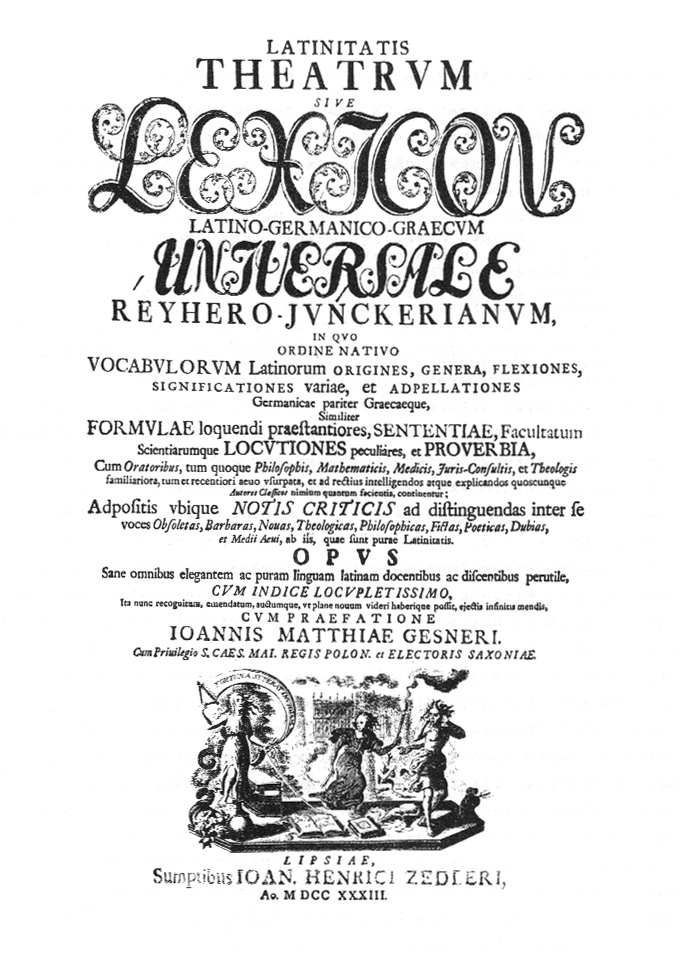
The cover of Zedler's new edition of the dictionary Theatrum Latinitatis edited by Johann Matthias Gesner

The spring of 1733 was marked by three events that had considerable influence on Zedler's fate as an entrepreneur. In February Zedler launched a monthly paperback magazine called Open Cabinet of Great Men, or the Current Status of All Kingdoms and Countries of the World. The new journal was aimed at awakening public interest in news from the political, military and court areas. It was a success, publishing 25 editions up to 1735, but, according to Zedler's biographer Gerd Quedenbaum, in the long run it was not a remarkable source of revenue. In March 1733, Zedler bought the publishing house of Johann Herbord Kloss, who had died in 1730. Kloss had a total of 1,014 titles on offer, and in terms of volume was in the first third of the Leipzig booksellers. However, many of these titles were scarcely marketable. In mid-April, Zedler announced a new publication in a newspaper advertisement, a Latin-Greek-German lexicon by Andreas Reyher and Christian Juncker, edited by Johann Matthias Gesner.

In March, Zedler had optimistically advertised books from the Johann Herbord Kloss printing house. By June, he was already preparing a sale of 10,000 bound and unbound books of the acquired inventory, with a high proportion of "junk product". The sale was arranged as an auction, held on 27 July. There were growing indications that Zedler was in financial difficulties and had to rely on short-term gains. On 5 October the Halle bookseller Johann Gottfried Oertel offered a catalog of books from Zedler for the upcoming Leipzig Michaelmas fair at discounts of up to 50%.

Zedler used these low prices during the first week of the fair to try to obtain cash. The main problem was the completion of the eleventh and last volume of the Lutheran writings, whose appearance was announced at the same Michaelmas Fair of 1733. This was the end of a solid source of income. Moreover, until now the costs of the last volume had been met by Praenumeration advances on the next volume. Now the bills had to be settled.

In December 1733, Zedler introduced news on the Current State of War in his Cabinet magazine, increasing sales. But a few months later he faced competition from the Leipzig publisher Moritz Georg Weidmann with a competing magazine on news of the European states. Just before the start of the Easter Fair of 1734, Zedler again tried to run down his inventory by low offers. At the end of 1734 he ran ads for a magazine project called News Worth Reading for the City and the New University of Göttingen, but it probably was never published.

=== Recovery attempt: the book lottery ===
In the spring of 1735 Zedler resorted to a new means to convert inventory into cash. In a specially printed brochure, he announced a book lottery. All participants would receive books, with a value equivalent to the amount they had paid, so there would be no losers. They would also get a ticket to a draw of valuable books. The draw was to be on 18 April 1735 during the Easter fair, and would have brought new publicity to Zedler. Zedler pledged to donate a portion of the earnings to the Leipzig orphanage.

Zedler's opponents, led by Weidmann, opposed the scheme. They appealed to the Leipzig town council and the Supreme Consistory in Dresden to ban the lottery. They pointed out that Zedler's Universal-Lexicon was among the prizes, and reiterated that the ban on sales of works produced in Saxony still applied. As Zedler received no immediate response from Dresden, he had to let the date for the draw pass. On 28 May, he was finally told that the lottery was approved, but only on condition that the Universal-Lexicon was removed from the offer. This was probably the most attractive prize. Added to this, one of Zedler's competitors, Johann Christian Martini, failed and flooded the market with its stock of books. On 3 October 1735, before the Michaelmas Fair Zedler advertised that lots were still available. Soon after he announced a new auction of 6,521 books and 1,121 engravings.

On 8 April 1736, Zedler again advertised his lottery plan through a newspaper ad. This time, however, the lots were offered at a greatly reduced price. Quedenbaum concludes that at this time Zedler was in such great financial distress was that he wanted to sell his stock of book at any price.

=== Financial collapse ===
The circumstances of Zedler's financial collapse are obscure. It is clear that after a certain point Zedler could no longer meet his payment obligations to creditors. Albrecht Kirchhoff in his 1892 book reproduced a report dated 10 October 1738 from the Council of the City of Leipzig to the government in Dresden on the subject. It is not known when exactly Zedler's insolvency occurred. Juntke writes in a paper published in 1956 that the privilege dispute had bankrupted Zedler in the spring of 1735. Writing in 1962, Blühm agrees, saying formal bankruptcy occurred in spring of 1735. Quedenbaum considers that the collapse probably did not occur before 1736. Modern biographical works such as the 2003 article by Winfried Müller in Saxon biography avoid the problem by not discussing the exact date and circumstances of Zedler's financial collapse in detail.

== Wolf, Zedler, Heinsius ==
=== Fresh start and the fight against pirated publications ===
The financial commitment of the Leipzig businessman Johann Heinrich Wolf gave Zedler a new start. In the Universal-Lexicon, Wolf is described as a merchant with a special love of science who likes nothing better than reading good and scholarly books. Quedenbaum thought Wolf took over further funding of Zedler because he was right in the target audience of the Universal-Lexicon, and believed in continuing the work rather than in letting it cease. There are no recorded documents such as a contract between Zedler and Wolf, so the details of the relationship are not known.

On 5 August 1737, Zedler's imperial privilege for printing the Universal-Lexicon was suspended. Zedler said this was because of failure to deliver copies of his work due to the imperial court. Quedenbaum considers this unlikely and suggests that the withdrawal of the imperial printing privilege was due to the influence of the book printer and publisher Johann Ernst Schultze, of the Bavarian court. Schultze was aware of Zedler's financial collapse, since he had been involved in printing previous volumes. Also, Schultze had found a suitable editor with Paul Daniel Longolius, who in 1735 had been appointed rector of the school at Hof. As a former employee of Zedler, Longolius had the experience needed for publication of further volumes of the encyclopedia. After Zedler lost the privilege he had been granted in January 1735, Schultze requested an imperial privilege in his own name, which was issued on 11 June 1738.

Schultze printed 17th and 18th volumes of the Universal-Lexicon and tried to sell them in Leipzig. To this end, he sent the imperial notary Bernhard Christian Groot from Offenbach with two journeymen printers as witnesses to the Leipzig Book Commission. The Book Commission accepted Groot but the Leipzig Council threw him out of town. In a letter dated 10 October 1738 the council explained their decision to the State Government in Dresden, rejecting the validity of Groot's imperial authority to publish in the city.

For Zedler this document restricting the scope of the imperial privilege was a godsend, because it secured the continuation of his lexicon. The philosophy professor Carl Günther Ludovici, a classmate of Longolius, took over as editor of the Universal-Lexicon from Volume 19. Schultze stopped printing further volumes of the Universal-Lexicon's in 1745 because of financial difficulties.

=== Temporary retirement ===
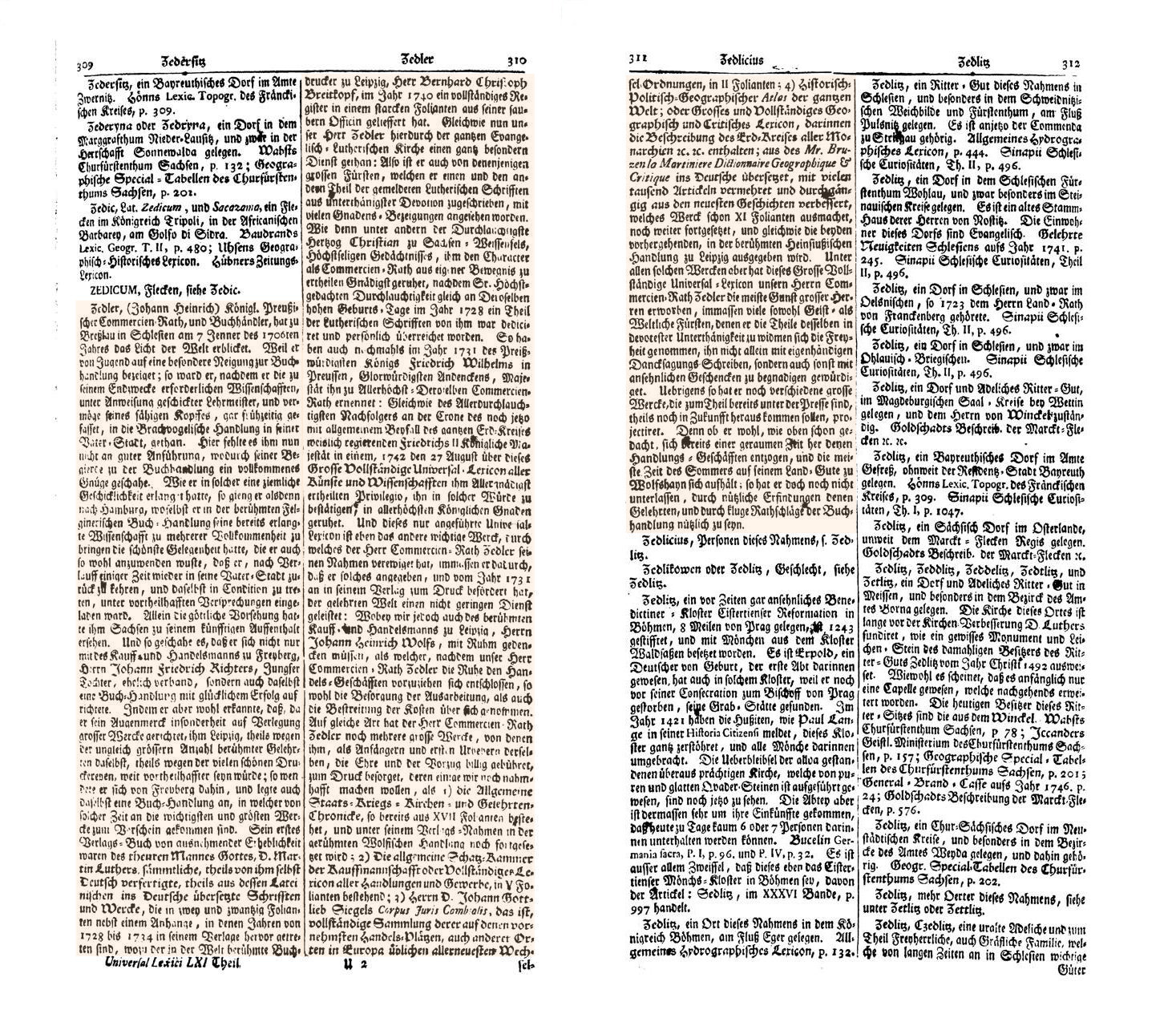
61st Volume of the Universal-Lexicon published in 1749, which contained the article on Zedler

Zedler was increasingly marginalized after the financial takeover of his publishing house by Wolf, and after Carl Günther Ludovici took over the direction of the 19th and subsequent volumes of the Universal-Lexicon. Ludovici made the bibliography at the end of each article more complete, made articles much longer and introduced biographies of living people. Zedler seems to have also given up his own bookstore, because an advertisement for the Easter Fair of 1739, published in the New Learned Papers, said that the two most recent encyclopedia volumes were available from "Wolf's vault, Auerbach court".

Zedler began to return to private life. The article on Zedler published in 1749 in the 61st volume of the Universal-Lexicon remarks that Zedler had decided on forms of employment he preferred to the trade after the acquisition of the publishing business by Wolf. Zedler owned property in Wolfshain, one of five villages that Moritz, Duke of Saxony had given Leipzig University in 1544. Quedenbaum characterized Zedler as "impetuous", and suggested that he retired to peace in Wolfshain in order to plan new publishing projects. However, he needed to publish under a new name to avoid past associations.

=== New publishing projects with Heinsius ===
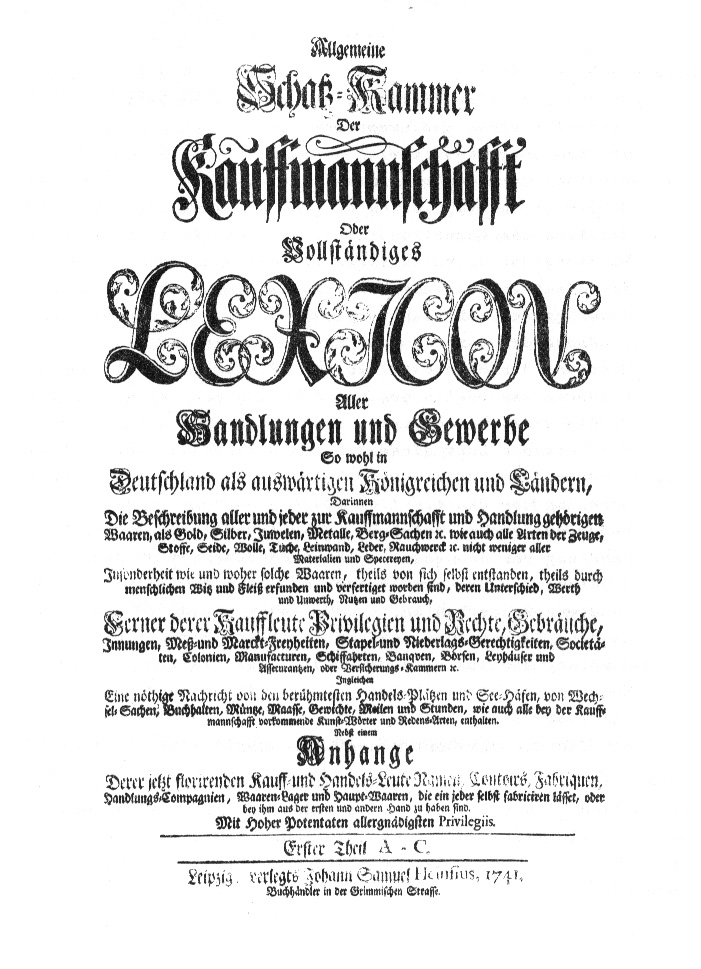
Cover of the first volume of the General Treasure Chamber under the trade name of Heinsius

In 1740 a number of Zedler's products appeared under the name of the Leipzig bookseller and publisher Johann Samuel Heinsius. This began with a relaunch of Zedler's Cabinet magazine, under a slightly altered title. It is not known how successful the new magazine was, or why Heinsius included it in his publishing program since from 1739 he already had a similar monthly magazine under the title of Genealogical and Historical Messages of the Principal Events of the European Courts.

In 1741 there followed the first volume of the General Treasure Chamber, a four volume commercial lexicon translated by Ludovici from the Dictionnaire universel de commerce (General Commercial Dictionary) by Jacques Savary des Brûlons. The fourth volume was delivered as early as 1742, covering the letters "S" to "Z". A year later, a supplementary volume was produced with additions and an index. A final part of the work advertised under the title "Merchants now living in and outside Germany" did not appear.

Zedler's next publishing project was the Corpus Juris Cambialis (Stock Exchange Laws) of Johann Gottlieb Siegel. Heinsius advertised the two-volume publication in the newspapers in April 1742, seeking Praenumeration subscribers. Both volumes were ready in time for the Leipzig Michaelmas Fair that year, as were the 33rd and 34th volumes of the Universal-Lexicon. The 12th volume of the General State, War, Church and Scholarly History under the auspices of Wolf also appeared at this, with content up to 1700.

After the Treasury Board and the Corpus Juris Cambialis, Zedler again began a major publishing project. The basis for Heinsius's Historical and Political-Geographic Atlas of the Whole World was a translation of the Grand dictionnaire géographique et critique of Antoine-Augustin Bruzen de La Martinière. The German version ran to 13 volumes, published by Heinsius between 1744 and 1749.

== Last years and death ==
Zedler probably created, or at least initiated further work. The Universal-Lexicon article on Zedler published in 1749 says "he has several large works that are already being printed and should still come out". The influence of Zedler on further publishing projects is no longer detectable. In the years up to 1751 the work of Wolf appears under or with the name of Heinsius. For each Easter and Michaelmas Fair the firm published two volumes of the Universal-Lexicon, and at each of the Easter Fairs it published a volume of the General State, War, Religious and Scholarly Chronicle. The alphabetical volumes of the Universal-Lexicon up to 1750 were completed in this way. Ludovici later expanded the Universal-Lexicon by four supplementary volumes.

Zedler spent most of his last years on his estate near Leipzig. The Universal-Lexicon article on Zedler said that nevertheless he continued to provide useful advice to the firm. Zedler's sponsor Johann Peter von Ludewig had died in September 1743. Heinsius died in December 1750, and his company became known as "Johann Samuel Heinsius heirs". On 21 March 1751 Zedler also died, as recorded in the grave register of Leipzig. His widow Christiana Dorothea left Leipzig in 1754 and moved back to Freiberg. She died soon after on 18 November 1755. Her marriage to Zedler remained childless.
