= Weidmannsche Buchhandlung =

German publisher

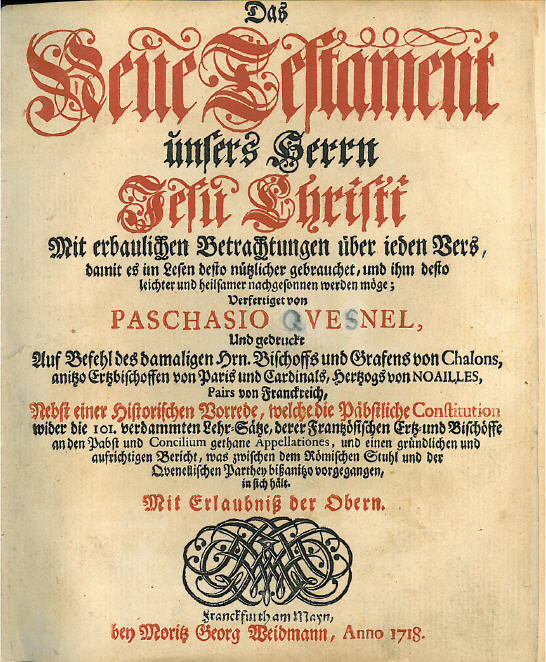
New Testament published by Weidmann in 1718

Weidmannsche Buchhandlung is a German book publisher established in 1680 that remained independent until it was acquired by Verlag Georg Olms in 1983.

== History ==
Weidmannsche Buchhandlung was established in 1680 in Frankfurt by Moritz Georg Weidmann (1658–1693), who moved to Leipzig in 1681. Johann Ludwig Gleditsch, brother of Johann Friedrich Gleditsch, married Weidmann's widow in 1694 and built up the business of the house, while training the younger Moritz Georg Weidmann (1686–1743) to take over the business. Gleditsch published authors such as Wieland, Gellert, Lessing, Lavater and Heyne. The most significant achievement of the Gleditsch brothers was to persuade the leading Dutch booksellers to send their works to the Leipzig fair instead of to Frankfurt.

Weidmannsche Buchhandlung continued to publish in Leipzig until 1854, reaching its height under Philipp Erasmus Reich, called the "nation's bookseller".

The firm moved to Berlin in 1854, and continued publishing in Berlin, Dublin and Zürich under the Reimer publishing family. In 1983 the firm was taken over by Verlag Georg Olms. Books printed in Berlin bore the Latin imprimatur "apud Weidmannos, Berolini".

== Leadership ==
The publishing house was led by:

- Moritz Georg Weidmann (1680–1693)
- Johann Ludwig Gleditsch (1694–1717)
- Moritz Georg Weidmann (1713/1717–1743)
- Philipp Erasmus Reich (1746–1787)
- Georg Andreas Reimer (1822–1832)
- Karl Reimer and Salomon Hirzel (1830–1852/1858)
- Hans Reimer d. Ä. (1865–1887)
- Paul Parey und Ernst Vollert (1888–1928)
- Hans Reimer d.J. (1913–1951)
- Walter Georg Olms (1983–)

== Published writers ==
The publisher has published writings of:

- Ernst Moritz Arndt
- Adelbert von Chamisso
- Christian Fürchtegott Gellert
- Johann Kaspar Lavater
- Johann Gottfried Herder
- Alexander von Humboldt
- Christoph Martin Wieland
- Jean Paul
- August Wilhelm
- Friedrich Schlegel
- Brothers Grimm
- Ulrich von Wilamowitz-Moellendorff
- Heinrich Friedrich Karl Freiherr vom Stein
- Theodore Mommsen
