= Subscription (finance) =

Process of investors

Subscription refers to the process of investors signing up and committing to invest in a financial instrument, before the actual closing of the purchase. The term comes from the Latin word subscribere.

== Historical ==
=== Praenumeration ===
An early form of subscription was praenumeration, a common business practice in the 18th-century book trade in Germany. The publisher offered to sell a book that was planned but had not yet been printed, usually at a discount, so as to cover their costs in advance. The business practice was particularly common with magazines, helping to determine in advance how many subscribers there would be. Praenumeration is similar to the recent crowdfunding financing model.

== New issues ==
=== Subscription agreement ===
Subscription to new issues can be covered by a subscription agreement, legally committing the investor to invest in the financial instrument, and committing the company to certain obligations and warranties. In some jurisdictions, it is possible for the issuer and subscriber to use a template subscription agreement as the basis of this agreement, although bespoke contract drafting by a qualified specialist may be required in more complex cases.

=== Subscription period ===
When a new security is to be issued, investors typically have two weeks to submit their subscription orders. At the end of this subscription period, the issuer announces the offering price and the method of allotment.

=== Allotment ===
Allotment is a method of distributing securities to investors when an issue has been oversubscribed. At the end of the subscription period, the demand for a new issue can exceed the number of the company's shares or bonds being issued. In such cases, the underwriting bank allots the securities with the approval of the issuer, either by lottery or on the basis of a formula. An allotment formula usually takes into account the issuer's preferred target investor groups.

== Oversubscription ==
A funding round is oversubscribed when the company has obtained funding commitments from subscribers that, in aggregate, amount to more money than the company needs or intends to raise. The term may be used informally to describe a state where there is more money available than the company needs.

== See also ==
- Initial public offering
- Greenshoe
