= Moritz Georg Weidmann =

German bookseller and publisher (1686–1743)

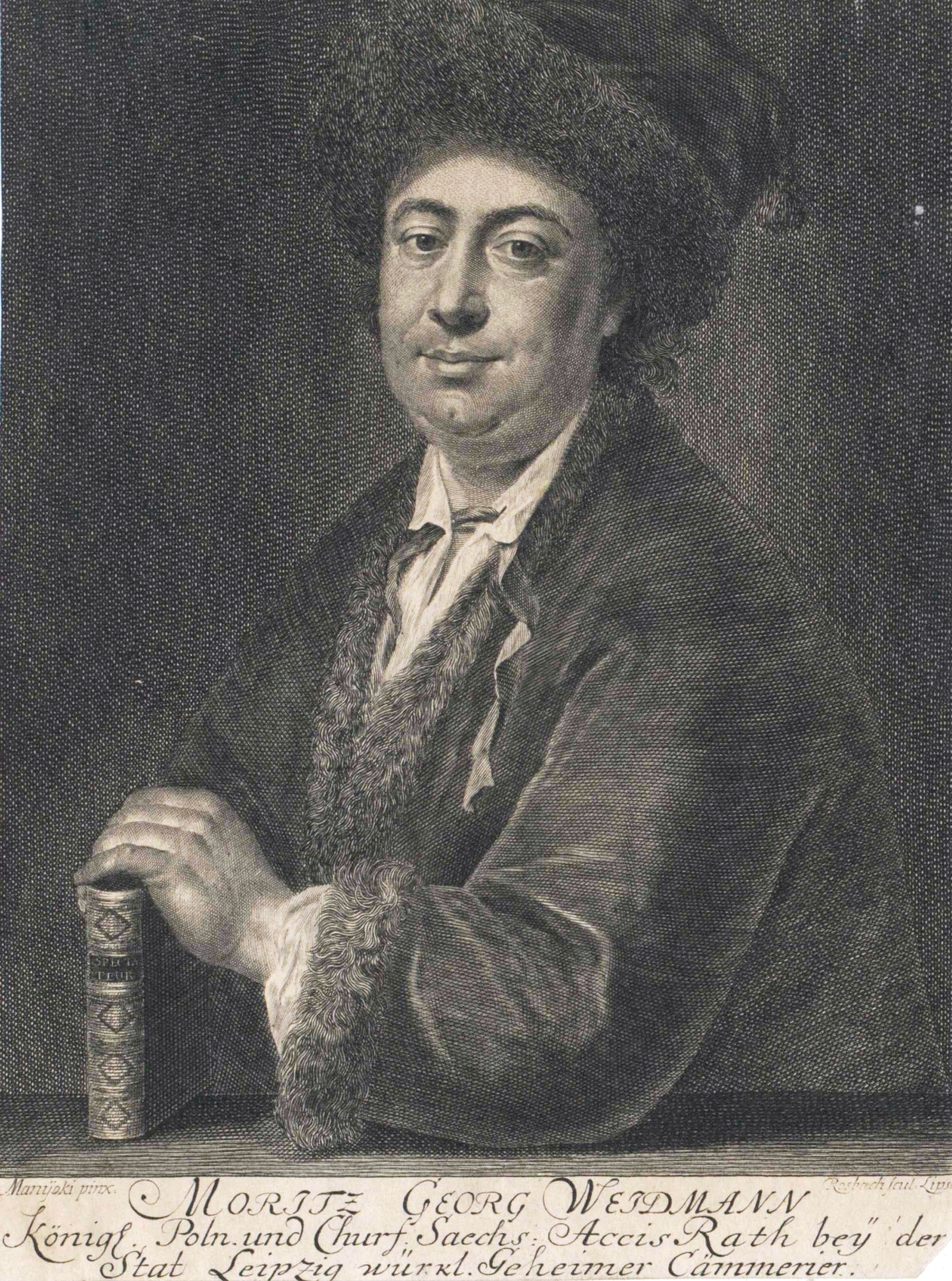

Moritz Georg Weidmann (23 January 1686 – 3 May 1743) was a German bookseller and publisher based in Leipzig, accredited to the courts of Poland and the Electorate of Saxony. He was the son of the Moritz Georg Weidmann Senior. He entered the business in 1713 as a partner, and in 1717 took complete control of his father's bookstore, which his stepfather, Johann Ludwig Gleditsch, had managed for him since 1694.

== Biography ==
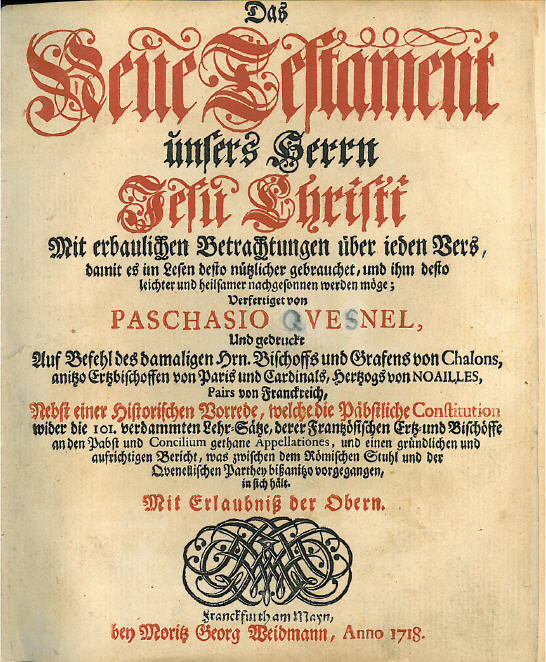
New Testament published by Weidmann in 1718

Moritz Georg Weidmann was born in 1686, son of the elder Moritz Georg Weidmann who died in 1693. The family firm of Weidmannsche Buchhandlung had been established in Frankfurt by his father in 1680, moving to Leipzig in 1681. Johann Ludwig Gleditsch, brother of Johann Friedrich Gleditsch, married his father's widow and built up the business of the house, while training the younger Moritz Georg to take over the business. Gleditsch published authors such as Wieland, Gellert, Lessing, Lavater and Heyne. The most significant achievement of the Gleditsch brothers was to persuade the leading Dutch booksellers to send their works to the Leipzig fair instead of to Frankfurt. After his stepson had taken control in 1717, Gleditsch withdrew from the book trade.

Early in 1734, Weidmann introduced a magazine of news of the European states, Europäischen Staats-Secretarius, in competition with Johann Heinrich Zedler's monthly Cabinet magazine. When Zedler attempted to boost sales through a book lottery, Weidmann was the leader of the booksellers opposing the innovation.

Weidmannsche Buchhandlung continued to publish in Leipzig until 1854, reaching its height under Philipp Erasmus Reich, called the "nation's bookseller". The firm later moved to Berlin and in 1983 was taken over by Georg Olms.
