= Malachy Postlethwayt =

British commerce expert and lexicographer

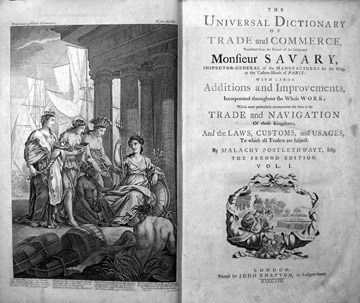
Malachy Postlethwayt's Universal Dictionary of Trade and Commerce, 1757

Malachy Postlethwayt (5 May 1707 – 13 September 1767) was a British economist and lexicographer, famous for his publication of the commercial dictionary titled The Universal Dictionary of Trade and Commerce in 1757. The dictionary was a translation and adaptation of the Dictionnaire universel du commerce of the French Inspector General of the Manufactures for the King, Jacques Savary des Brûlons.

Postlethwayt also wrote several works defending the slave trade and advocating for its expansion. He was a lobbyist for the Royal African Company and asserted that slave trade was central to British Empire's economic interests. In his first pamphlet, The African Trade, the Great Pillar and Support of the British Plantation (1745), Postlethwayt stated that "our West Indian and African Trades are the most nationally beneficial of any we carry on". In reaction to those who denounced slave trade, he answered: "Many are prepossessed against this Trade, thinking it a barbarous, inhuman, and unlawful Traffic for a Christian Country to trade in Blacks" but Africans would be better off to "live in a civilized Christian Country" than among "Savages".

== Life ==
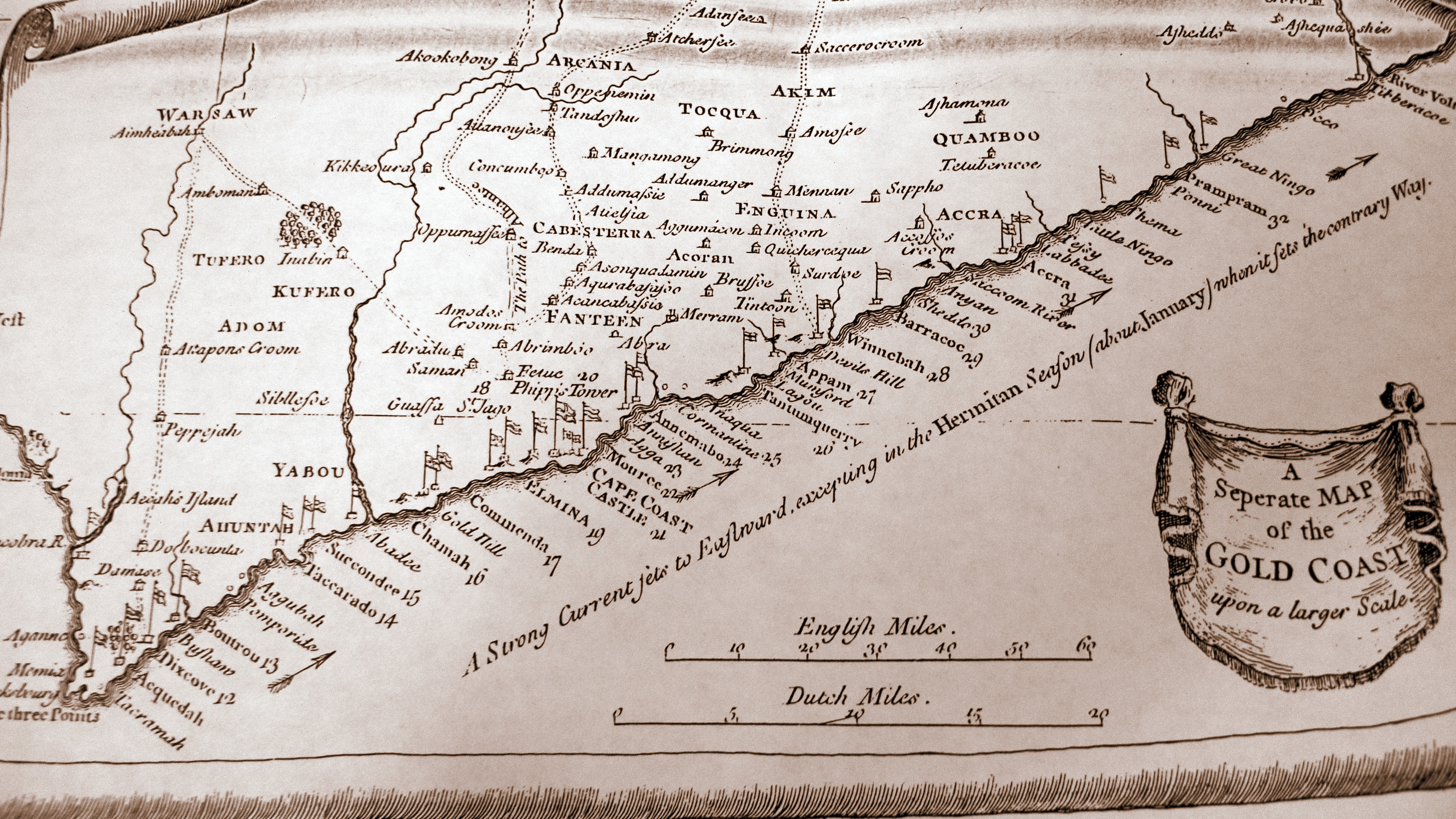
The Gold Coast of Africa

Born 5 May 1707, Postlethwayt was elected a Fellow of the Society of Antiquaries of London on 21 March 1734. In 1743 he secured a position with the Royal Africa Company, and elected to its Court of Assistants (governing board) 17 January 1744. He wrote in the company's defence over the next two years.

Postlethwayt died suddenly on 13 September 1767 aged 60. He was buried in the Old Street churchyard, in Clerkenwell, north London.

== Works ==
Postlethwayt spent 20 years preparing The Universal Dictionary of Trade and Commerce, London, 1751 (3rd edit. London, 1766; 4th edit. London, 1774), a translation, with large additions, from the French work of Jacques Savary des Brûlons. Postlethwayt drew on Savary's work and Richard Cantillion as well as other writers of the day, and clarified how economic theory applied to economic and political issues current then.

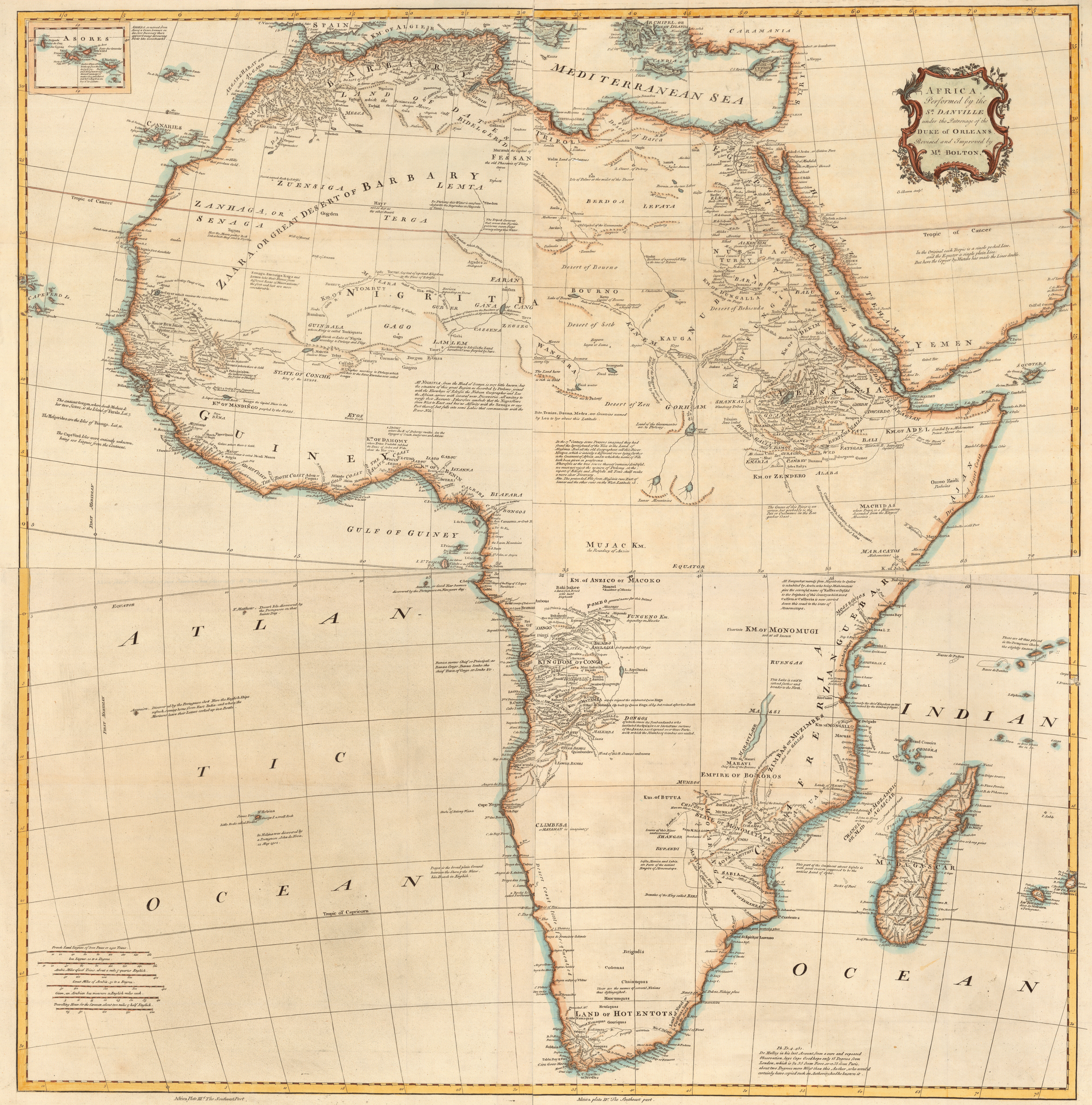
Map of Africa from Postlethwayt's The Universal Dictionary of Trade and Commerce

Postlethwayt also published:

- The African Trade the great Pillar and Support of the British Plantation Trade in America, &c., 1745.
- The National and Private Advantages of the African Trade considered, &c., 1746.
- Britain's Commercial Interest Explained, Vol. I of his Universal Dictionary of Trade and Commerce, 1747.
- Considerations on the making of Bar Iron with Pitt or Sea Coal Fire, &c. In a Letter to a Member of the House of Commons, London, 1747.
- Considerations on the Revival of the Royal-British Assiento, between his Catholic Majesty and the … South-Sea Company. With an … attempt to unite the African-Trade to that of the South-Sea Company, by Act of Parliament, London, 1749.
- The Merchant's Public Counting House, or New Mercantile Institution, &c., London, 1750.
- A Short State of the Progress of the French Trade and Navigation, &c., London, 1756.
- Great Britain's True System. … To which is prefixed an Introduction relative to the Forming a New Plan of British Politicks with respect to our Foreign Affairs, &c., London, 1757.
- Britain's Commercial Interest explained and improved, in a Series of Dissertations on several important Branches of her Trade and Police. … Also … the Advantages which would accrue … from an Union with Ireland, 2 vols., London, 1757; 2nd edit., 'With ... a clear View of the State of our Plantations in America', &c., London, 1759.
- In Honour to the Administration. The importance of the African Expedition considered, &c., London, 1758.

Trinidadian historian Eric Williams cited the works of Postlethwayt on the slave trade in his seminal work Capitalism and Slavery (1944).

E. A. J. Johnson devotes a chapter in his work Predecessors of Adam Smith: The Growth of British Economic Thought (1937, reprint 1960) to Malachy Postlethwayt, Postlethwayt, the Publicist, p. 185-205.
