= Antoine-Augustin Bruzen de La Martinière =

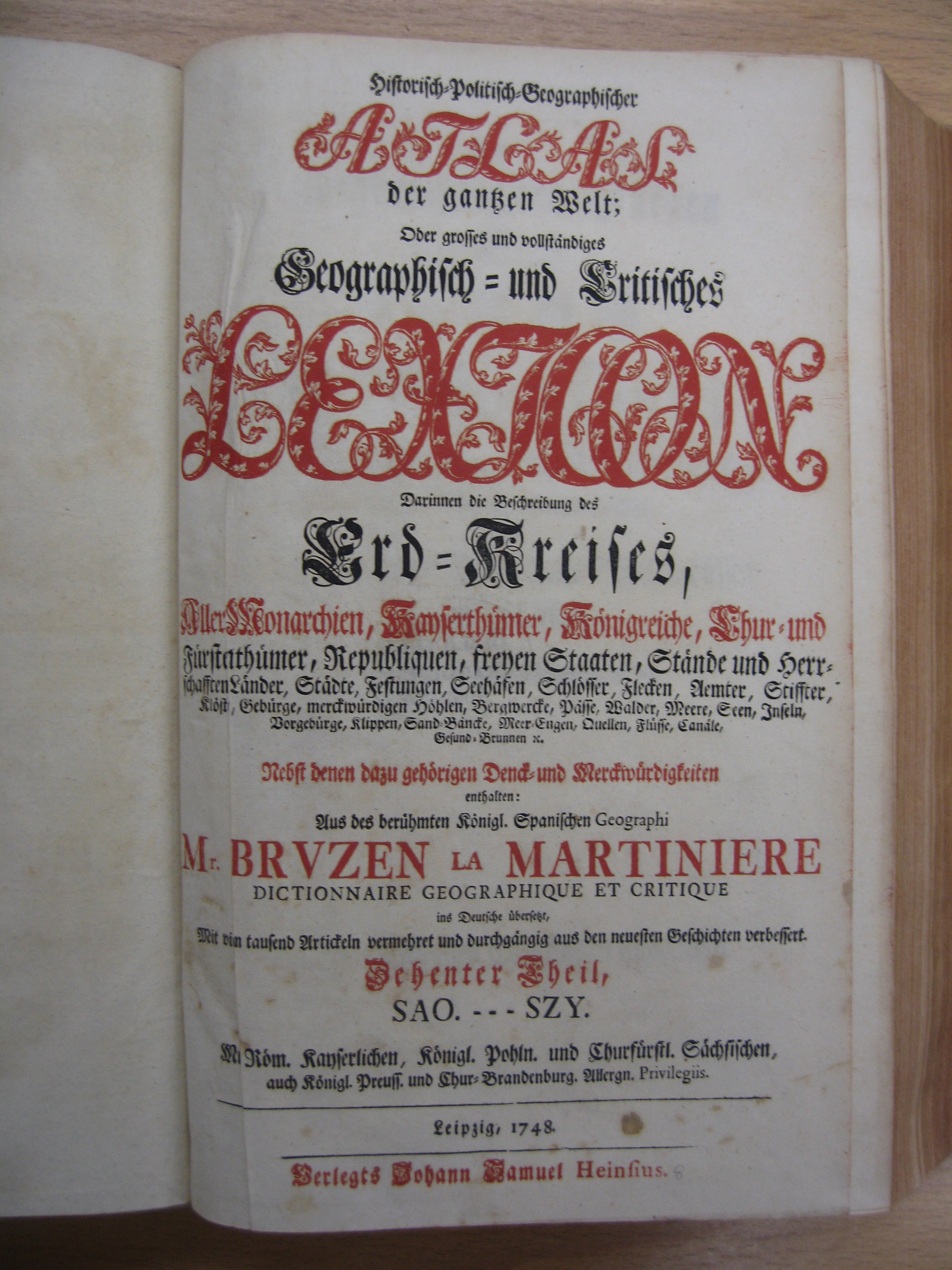
Title page of the German edition of Grand dictionnaire géographique et critique of 1748

Antoine-Augustin Bruzen de La Martinière or de la Martiniere (1662 at Dieppe, Province of Normandy – 19 June 1746 in The Hague), was a French polymath. His main work was the Grand Dictionnaire Geographique Et Critique published in ten volumes between 1726 and 1739. Thanks to the munificence of his patrons, he lived at the court of Friedrich Wilhelm, Duke of Mecklenburg-Schwerin, then Francesco Farnese, Duke of Parma. He was also employed by king Philip V of Spain.

== Life ==
La Martinière was born in Dieppe in 1662 and grew up in Paris with his uncle, the theologian and historian Richard Simon. In 1709 he went to the court of Duke Friedrich Wilhelm of Mecklenburg. After Friedrich Wilhelm's death in 1713, La Martinière entered the service of Francesco Farnese, the Duke of Parma, who sent him on a diplomatic mission to the Netherlands. In Amsterdam he undertook many translations and compilations. As Secretary of the Philip V, King of Sicily and Spain, La Martinière received a pension of 1,200 ECU. After several years in the Netherlands, La Martinière moved to the Hague, where he lived until his death in June 1746.

== Work ==
La Martinière's main work is the 10 volume Grand Dictionnaire Geographique Et Critique, of which the first volume appeared in 1726 in the Hague. It is one of the most extensive geographical works of the 18th Century. On the advice of the Marquis Beretti Landi, Ambassador of Spain to the States-General of the Netherlands, La Martinière dedicated the work to the Spanish King Philip V. In Germany, the work was translated and expanded under the title Historical and Political-Geographic Atlas of the whole world. The alphabetical volumes of the German edition were published in 1744–1749, and a supplementary volume in 1750. The publisher was Johann Samuel Heinsius of Leipzig, but the translation and expansion project was initiated by his partner Johann Heinrich Zedler. The Grand Dictionnaire Geographique Et Critique was published in several editions after La Martinière's death, such as a six-volume revised edition in Paris in 1768.

== Bibliography ==
- L'Art de conserver sa santé, par l'École de Salerne. Traduction nouvelle en vers françois par M. B.L.M. Augmenté d'un traité sur la conservation de La Beauté des Dames, et de plusieurs autres Secrets utiles et agréables. Paris, Compagnie des libraires, 1760; 1772.
- Entretien des ombres aux champs Elisées, sur divers sujets d'Histoire, de Politique, de Morale, ouvrage traduit de l'allemand par Mr Valentin Jungerman, auteur Bruzen de La Martinière, paru en 1722-1723
- Introduction à l'histoire de l'Asie, de l'Afrique & de l'Amérique, pour servir de suite à l'introduction à l'Histoire du baron de Pufendorff, de Bruzen de La Martinière, édité à Amsterdam, 1735
- Le Grand Dictionnaire Géographique Et Critique, 1737
- Introduction générale à l'étude des Sciences et des Belles-Lettres. Précédée par des conseils pour former une bibliothèque, peu nombreuse mais choisie. (Par J.H.S. Formey), par BRUZEN DE LA MARTINIERE (Antoine-Augustin), Publié à : Paris, 1756.
