= Carl Günther Ludovici =

German philosopher, lexicographer and economist

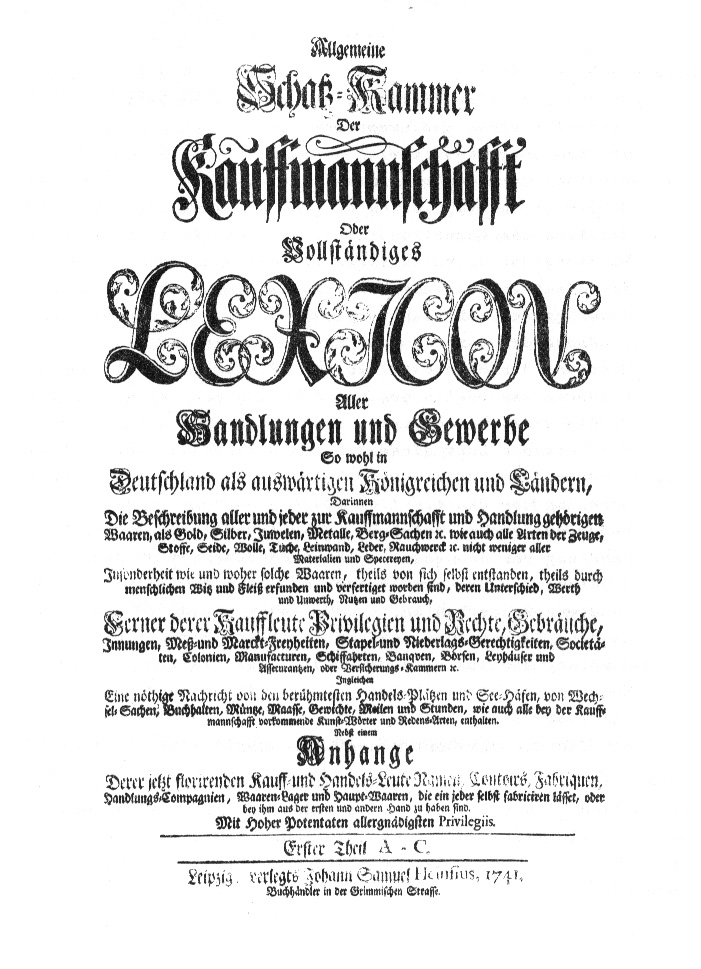
Cover of the first volume of the General Treasure Chamber, the merchant's lexicon.

Carl Günther Ludovici (or Ludewig) (7 August 1707 – 5 July 1778) was a philosopher, lexicographer and economist from Leipzig in the Electorate of Saxony in the Holy Roman Empire. He edited a large part of the Grosses vollständiges Universal-Lexicon, a major German encyclopedia of the 18th century.

== Life ==
Ludovici was born on 7 August 1707 in Leipzig, son of Christian Ludovici (1663–1732), professor of philosophy at the University of Leipzig, theologian and Orientalist. His father had him taught by tutors from the age of two. He attended the Thomas school, where he studied with Paul Daniel Longolius. In 1724 he began studies in philosophy and theology at the University of Leipzig, where he gained a Master's degree in 1728. In 1733, he became a full professor of practical philosophy at the university.

In 1739, Johann Heinrich Zedler appointed Ludovici editor of his Grosses Universal-Lexicon (Great Universal Lexicon), and he served until 1754 as chief editor of Volumes 19–64 and the supplement Volumes 1 to 4 of the largest German encyclopedia project of the 18th Century. In 1761 Ludovici became professor of Aristotelian logic. From 1765 to 1766 Ludovici was Rector of the University of Leipzig and at the same time Dean of the Faculty of Arts. Ludovici was a member of the Prussian Academy of Sciences and the Leipzig Society of economics, the liberal arts and the German language. He was also a member of the College of the principality College, warden of the calendar system and archivist at the University of Leipzig.

He died in Leipzig in 1778.

== Work ==
Ludovici's primary work as a professor was the presentation and interpretation of the philosophical teachings of Christian Wolff and Gottfried Wilhelm Leibniz. He published two extensive articles which sparked heated debate in the learned world. He received complaints from professors at the University of Halle, but was led into a lively correspondence with other scholars of his time.

As an editor, Ludovici introduced several innovations in the Great Universal Lexicon and a significantly increased its quality. He made the bibliography at the end of each article more complete, made articles much longer and introduced biographies of living people. His prefaces to volumes 19, 21, 23 and the first volume of the supplements are important lexicographical sources. The extensive article on Christian Wolff and the Wolffian philosophy is almost certainly his work.

While editing Zedler's Universal Lexicon, Ludovici did a German translation from the French of the Dictionaire de commerce of Jacques Savary des Brûlons, which was published as the General Treasure Chamber between 1741 and 1743. From this work grew the Open Academy of Merchants, a complete lexicon of commerce whose five volumes published by Zedler's partner Johann Samuel Heinsius began to appear in 1752 and were completed in 1756. It is the first complete German-language trade lexicon, with the last volume providing a systematic plan of this discipline. The lexicon was used in practice, as shown by the sales to commercial firms.

== Partial bibliography ==
- Carl Günther Ludovici (1730). Tentamen log. de ratione philosophandi in genere [The nature of philosophizing].
- Carl Günther Ludovici, Johann Samuel Tepler (1732). Specimen log. syllogismorum genesin exponens [the Genesis of syllogisms]. Langenhemius.
- Carl Günther Ludovici, Wolfgang Heinrich Winckler (1733). Disp. de ritu, osculis explorandi Romanarum mulierum abstinentiam a vino, lege Romuli sancitam.
- Carl Günther Ludovici, Heinrich Brühl (Graf von) (1737–1738). Ausführlicher Entwurff einer vollständigen Historie der Leibnitzischen Philosophie zum Gebrauch seiner Zuhörer [History of the Leibnitz philosophy]. Verlegts Johann Georg Löwe.
- Carl Günther Ludovici (1738). Sammlung und Auszüge der sämmtlichen Streitschrifften wegen der Wolffischen Philosophie zur Erläuterung der bestrittenen Leibnitzischen und Wolffischen Lehrsätze [Explanation of Leibnizian and Wolffian theorems]. Bornischer Buchladen.
- Carl Günther Ludovici (1738). Neueste Merckwurdigkeiten der leibnitz-wolffischen Weltweisheit [the Leibnizian-Wolffian philosophy].
- Carl Günther Ludovici, ed. (1739–1754). Grosses vollständiges Universal-Lexicon Aller Wissenschafften und Künste [Great Complete Universal Lexicon of Science and Art]. Vol. 19–64. Zedler.
- Jacques Savary des Brûlons. Carl Günther Ludovici (ed.). Allgemeine Schatz-Kammer Der Kauffmannschafft Oder Vollständiges Lexicon Aller Handlungen und Gewerbe So wohl in Deutschland als auswärtigen Königreichen und Ländern [General Treasure Chamber, the Merchants Complete Commercial Lexicon of Germany and foreign countries]. Heinsius, 1741-1743.
- Carl Günther Ludovici (1752–1756). Eröffnete Akademie der Kaufleute, oder vollständiges Kaufmanns-Lexicon [Open Academy of merchants, or total merchant Lexicon]. Johann Samuel Heinsius.
- Carl Günther Ludovici (1756). Grundriss eines vollständigen Kaufmanns-Systems, nebst den Anfangsgründen der Handlungswissenschaft, und angehängter kurzen Geschichte der Handlung zu Wasser und zu Lande [Layout of a full system of commerce, together with the rudiments of the science of commerce, and an attached short history of commerce on water and on land]. B.C. Breitkopf.
- Carl Günther Ludovici (1761). Regulae probabilitatis historicae gradus recte determinandi [Of the Rule of historical probability]. Breitkopf.
- Carl Günther Ludovici (1764). De perfectionibus sermonis aestheticis indeque deductis regulis SS. hermeneuticis nonnulla [On the Perfection of Esthetics of speech].
