= Jacques Savary =

French merchant

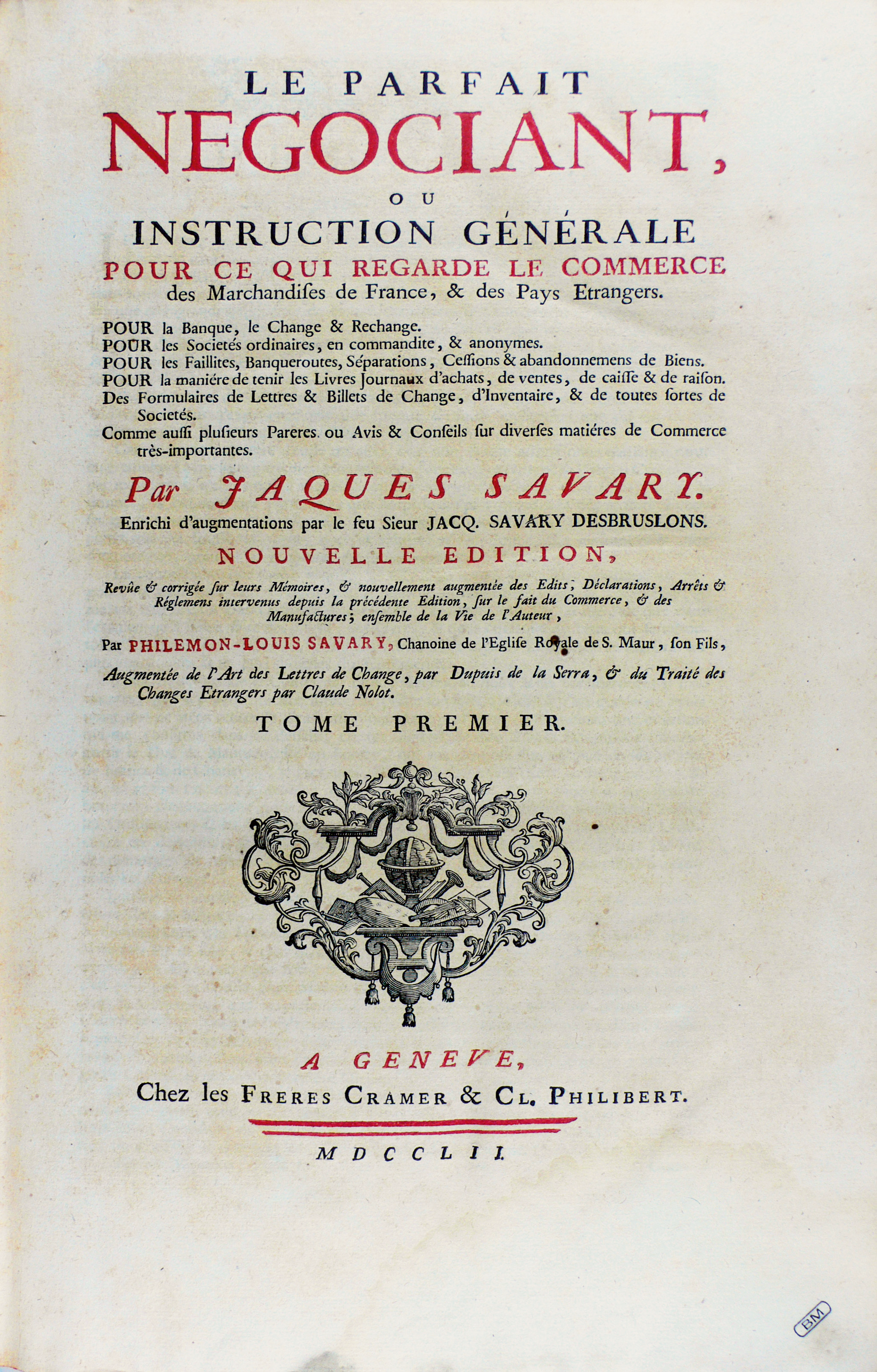
Le parfait négociant, 1752.

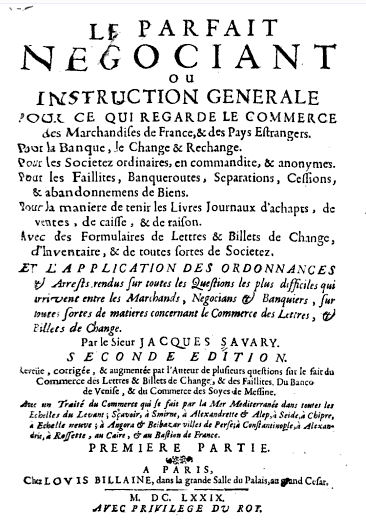
Jacques Savary, Le Parfait Négociant, 1679.

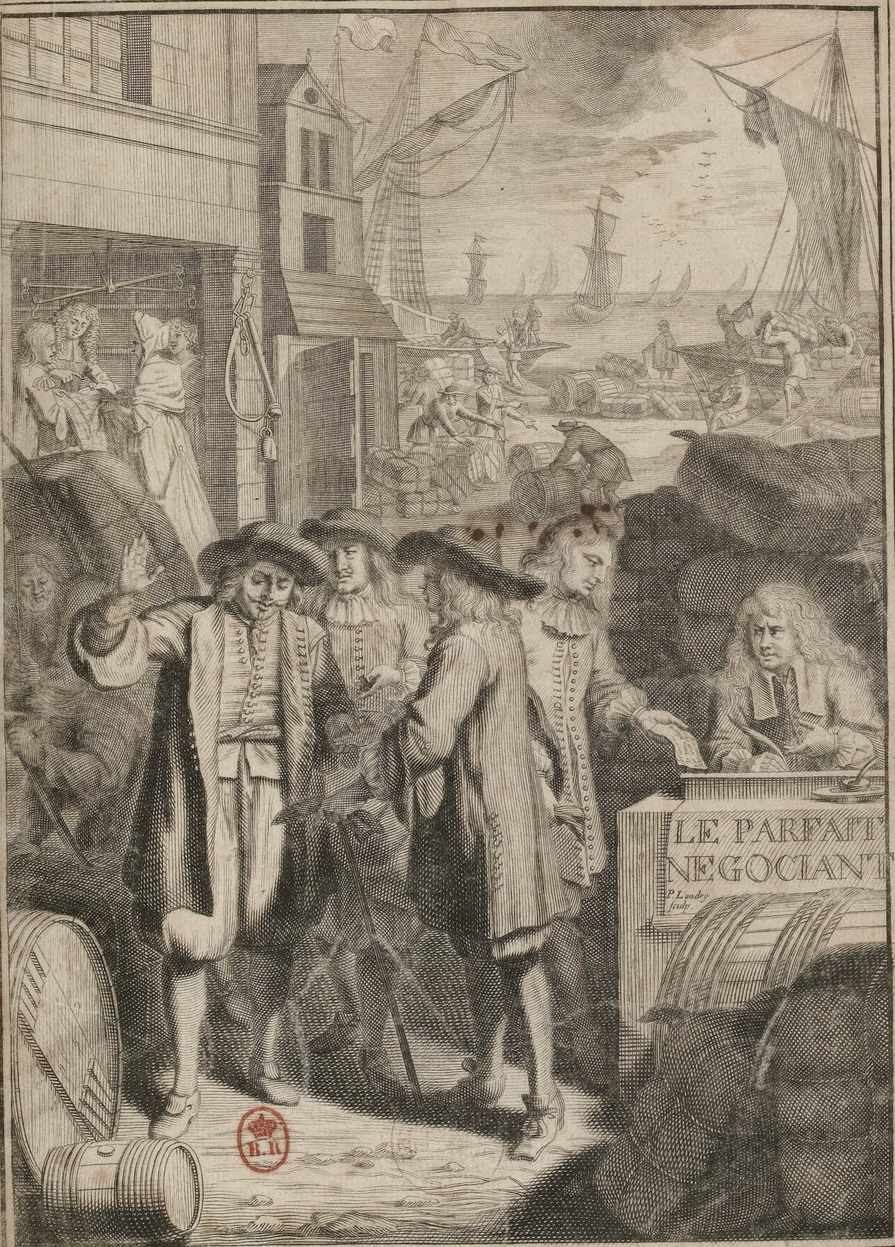
Jacques Savary, Le Parfait Negociant, frontiscipe, 1675.

Jacques Savary (22 September 1622 – 7 October 1690) was a successful French merchant who became a widely recognised expert on questions regarding commerce. He was the author of Le parfait négociant (1675), a manual on mercantile trade, which was translated into several languages.

== Life ==
Savary was born at Doué in Anjou on 22 September 1622 from a noble family that was devoted to trade. He studied law in Paris with a procureur, then became a wholesale merchant of haberdashery. By 1658 he had made his fortune. His friend Nicolas Fouquet, the Superintendent of Finances, gave him a contract for collecting the revenues of crown lands. After Fouquet fell from power, he gained the favor of the Chancellor Pierre Séguier, who charged him with arbitrating in numerous commercial questions. With a growing reputation, he was asked to assist the commission that revised the laws concerning trade, and had such influence that the ordinance of 1673 was named the "Code Savary". After the death of Jean-Baptiste Colbert in 1683, the new controller general of finances, Pelletier, ordered him to make an investigation of the financial affairs of the Western crown lands.

Savory had seventeen children, eleven of whom survived him, including the writer on economy Jacques Savary des Brûlons (1656–1716), and Louis-Philémon Savary (1654, 1727). He died on 7 October 1690.

== Works ==
Savary was asked to prepare a book from the many memoirs he had prepared for the commission revising the trade laws. This was published in 1675 with the title Le parfait négociant ou Instruction générale pour ce qui regarde le commerce des marchandises de France et des pays étrangers. (The Perfect Merchant or General Instruction regarding the mercantile trade of France and foreign countries). The book ran into many editions, and was translated into several languages. In 1688, Parfait published a sequel, Les Parères, ou Avis et Conseils sur les plus importantes Matières de Commerce (Customary Business Rules, or Advice and guidance on the most important materials of Commerce). These books and Savary's opinions were treated as having almost the weight of law.

== Bibliography ==
- Le parfait négociant: ou Instruction générale pour ce qui regarde le commerce des marchandises de France, & des pays étrangers 1675

New edition by Edouard RIchard (scient. edit.) Droz, Geneva, 2011, 2,428 p.

- Les Parères, ou Avis et Conseils sur les plus importantes Matières de Commerce 1688
