= Paul Daniel Longolius =

German encyclopedist (1704–1779)

Paul Daniel Longolius (1 November 1704 – 24 February 1779) was a German meteorologist, historian, and educator. He was educated at Leipzig University. He was the main editor of volumes 3 to 18 of Johann Heinrich Zedler's Grosses vollständiges Universal-Lexicon (an early encyclopedia) from 1733 to 1739, replacing Jacob August Franckenstein, who had edited the first two volumes. His successor was Carl Günther Ludovici.

He was born in Dresden, Electorate of Saxony and died in Hof.
