= Georg Olms Verlag =

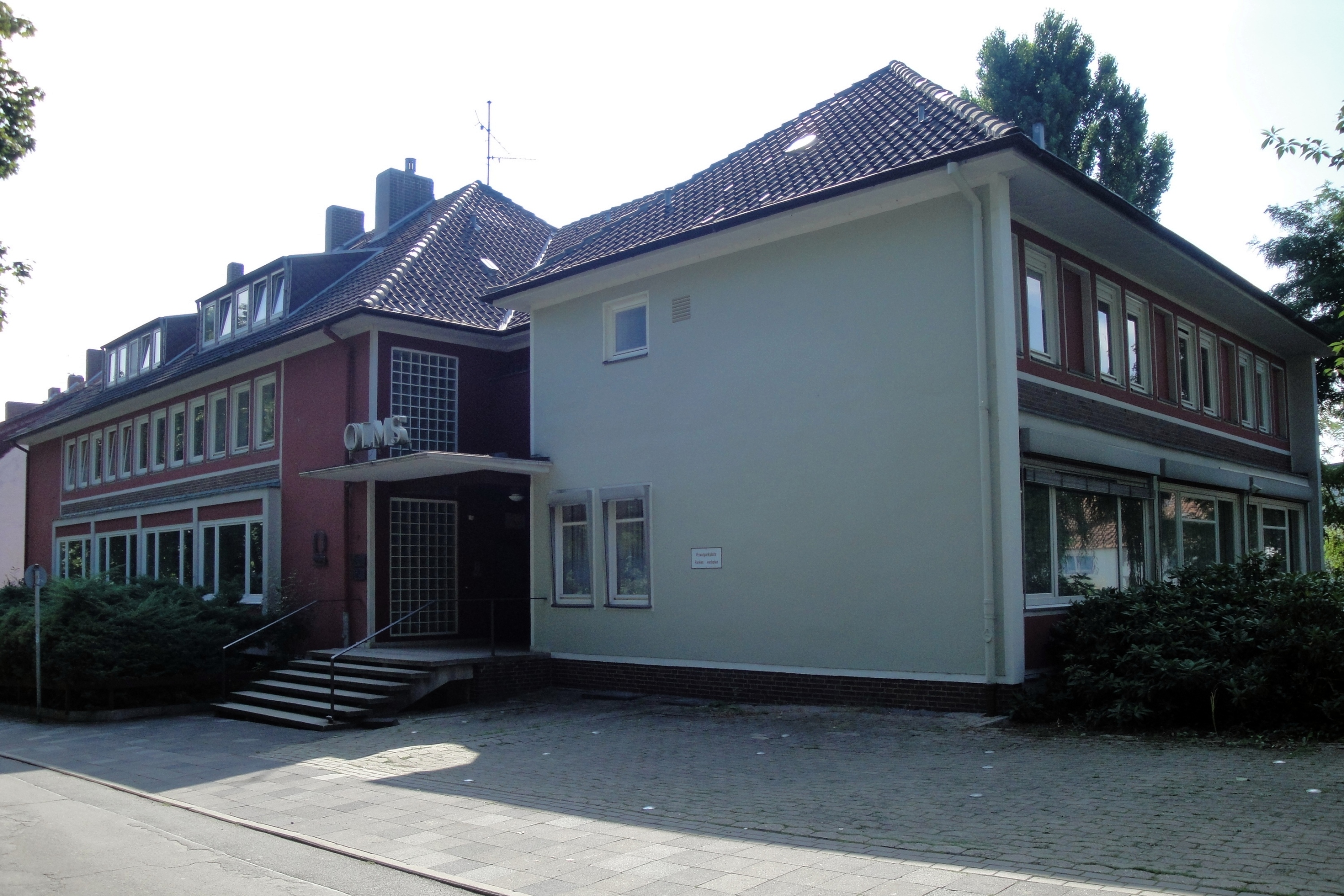
Georg Olms Verlag in Hildesheim.

Georg Olms Verlag is a Hildesheim-based book publisher with publications in the field of Geisteswissenschaft (i.e. the humanities): first publications, ebooks, reprints and microfiche in the fields of archaeology, Arab studies, history, history of medicine and natural sciences, hippology, Jewish studies, cultural studies, literary criticism, art history, musicology, modern philology, Oriental studies, philosophy, theology and religious studies.

== History ==
In 1886, Hermann Olms opened a bookstore in Hildesheim. Before the turn of the 20th century, the business expanded into a publishing company. School books, agricultural literature and local history works made up the publishing program.

On 1 November 1945, his son Georg, who for political reasons was prohibited from working as a bookseller and publisher in the Third Reich by the Reich Chamber of Literature, founded another bookstore, which he handed over to his son Walter Georg in 1953. From this he developed a scientific antiquarian bookshop and in 1958 founded the Georg Olms Verlagsbuchhandlung, which specialized in reprographic reprints of standard scientific works. In 1964, Walter Georg Olms acquired the publishing houses M. & H. Marcus (formerly Breslau) and Academia Verlag, Prague.

From 1969, works of trivial literature, fairy tales and legends, hippology, film history, culinary art and mail order catalogs were published under the name Olms Presse. In 1970 the publishing house opened a branch in New York City. Production area III at Georg Olms Verlag, Olms Neue Medien, has been dealing with microfiche, CD-ROM editions and ebooks for scientists, libraries and institutes since 1971.

Since the founding of Georg Olms Verlag GmbH in 1973 and Georg Olms AG in Zürich in 1980 with its subsidiary founded in Hildesheim in 1982, the publishing program has included not only first publications but also reprints of scientific literature on humanities and on the history of medicine, natural sciences and technology. Manfred Olms, a son of Walter Georg Olms, founded Edition Olms AG in Zürich in 1977 with a focus on non-fiction and photo books.

In 1983, Walter Georg Olms took over the Weidmannsche Buchhandlung, which was founded in 1680 and is considered one of the oldest publishers in the humanities. Dietrich Olms, the younger son of W. Georg Olms, took over the areas of marketing, sales and advertising in 1991. In 2002, he also took over program management.

In March 2007, the Internet portal OLMS ONLINE was presented to the public in Leipzig. With the mass catalogs (1594–1860) and 350 volumes from the reprint program, editions of works by the Brothers Grimm, Johann Gottfried Herder and Christian Wolff are also available digitally. In 2013, Georg Olms Verlag was awarded the publishing prize of the state of Lower Saxony.

== Bibliography ==
- Freyburg, W. Joachim, ed. (1987). 100 Jahre Olms: 1886–1986 [100 Years of Olms: 1886–1986] (Festschrift) (in German). Hildesheim / Zürich / New York City: Olms. ISBN 3-487-07920-8.
- Georg-Olms-Verlag, Weidmannsche Verlagsbuchhandlung, ed. (2006). 60 Jahre Georg Olms – 325 Jahre Weidmann [60 Years of Georg Olms – 325 Years of Weidmann] (in German). Hildesheim: Olms-Weidmann. ISBN 978-3-487-13111-5.
- Thomas, Georg (November 2020). "Bücher, Pferde, Scheichs. In einer ehemaligen Waschküche entstand vor 75 Jahren in Hildesheim der Georg Olms Verlag" [Books, horses, sheikhs. Georg Olms Verlag was founded 75 years ago in Hildesheim in a former laundry room]. Niedersächsische Wirtschaft (in German). 2020 (11): 44–45.
- Vollert, Ernst (1983). Die Weidmannsche Buchhandlung in Berlin 1680–1930 (Nachdruck der Ausgabe: Weidmann, Berlin 1930 und eine Ergänzung: Die Weidmannsche Verlagsbuchhandlung 1930–1983). Bibliothek des Börsenvereins des Deutschen Buchhandels (in German). Hildesheim: Weidmann. ISBN 3-615-00003-X.
