= Wischroda =

- Ortsteil of An der Poststraße
- Interactive map of Wischroda
- Location within Germany Location within Saxony-Anhalt
- Coordinates: 51°10′N 11°33′E
- Country: Germany
- State: Saxony-Anhalt
- District: Burgenlandkreis
- Town: An der Poststraße

Area
  - Total: 12.96 km^{2} (5.00 sq mi)
- Elevation: 269 m (883 ft)

Population (2006-12-31)
  - Total: 496
  - Density: 38.3/km^{2} (99.1/sq mi)
- Time zone: UTC+01:00 (CET)
  - Summer (DST): UTC+02:00 (CEST)
- Postal codes: 06647
- Dialling codes: 034467
- Website: www.vgem-finne.de

Wischroda is a village and a former municipality in the Burgenlandkreis district, in Saxony-Anhalt, Germany. Since 1 July 2009, it is part of the municipality An der Poststraße.
