= Jacob August Franckenstein =

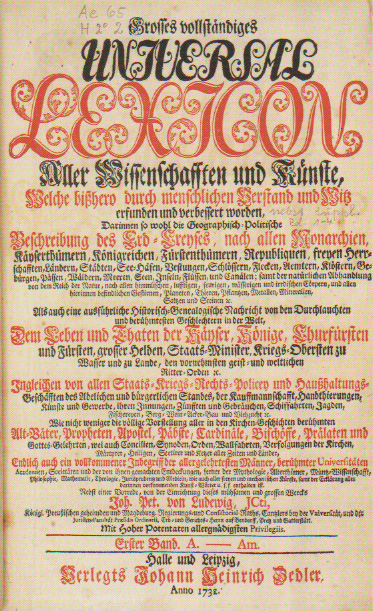
Zedler's Universal-Lexicon is considered the most important German-language encyclopedia of the 18th Century.

Jacob August Franckenstein (27 December 1689 – 10 May 1733) was the main editor of the first two volumes of Johann Heinrich Zedler's Grosses vollständiges Universal-Lexicon (Great Complete Universal Lexicon), the most important encyclopedia published in the Holy Roman Empire in the 18th century.

Franckenstein was born and died in Leipzig; he was the son of the lawyer and historian Christian Gottfried Franckenstein. In August 1713 he acquired a master's degree in philosophy in Leipzig, and in 1719 he received a doctorate in law in Erfurt. From 1721 to 1732 he was professor of natural and international law at the University of Leipzig. In 1722 he was temporarily a Councilor at Zerbst, the seat of government of the Prince of Anhalt-Zerbst, but after two years he returned to teaching at the university.

In 1731, Zedler asked Franckenstein to be the lead editor of the planned Universal Lexicon. He already had some experience with the book market. He was a colleague and confidant of Professor Johann Burckhardt Mencke, publisher of the journal "New Learned Works" and other periodicals, a supporter of Zedler's mammoth project. The first two volumes were prepared under Franckenstein's leadership. After two years, at a time of financial crisis, he fell out with Zedler and resigned from the job. His successor was Paul Daniel Longolius. Franckenstein died in Leipzig two months later, on 10 May 1733.

== External sources ==
- dazu kommentierter Artikel im Zedler
- Eintrag in der Sächsischen Biografie
