= An der Poststraße =

- Municipality
- Location of An der Poststraße within Burgenlandkreis district
- Interactive map of An der Poststraße
- Location within Germany Location within Saxony-Anhalt
- Coordinates: 51°10′N 11°33′E
- Country: Germany
- State: Saxony-Anhalt
- District: Burgenlandkreis
- Municipal assoc.: An der Finne
- Subdivisions: 9

Government
  - Mayor (2023–30): Christian Voigt

Area
  - Total: 44.45 km^{2} (17.16 sq mi)

Population (2025-12-31)
  - Total: 1,548
  - Density: 34.83/km^{2} (90.20/sq mi)
- Time zone: UTC+01:00 (CET)
  - Summer (DST): UTC+02:00 (CEST)
- Postal codes: 06647
- Dialling codes: 034463, 034465, 034467
- Vehicle registration: BLK

An der Poststraße (German pronunciation: [an deːɐ̯ ˈpɔstˌʃtʁaːsə]) is a municipality in the Burgenlandkreis district, in Saxony-Anhalt, Germany. It was formed by the merger of the previously independent municipalities Klosterhäseler, Wischroda and Herrengosserstedt, on 1 July 2009.

== Etymology ==
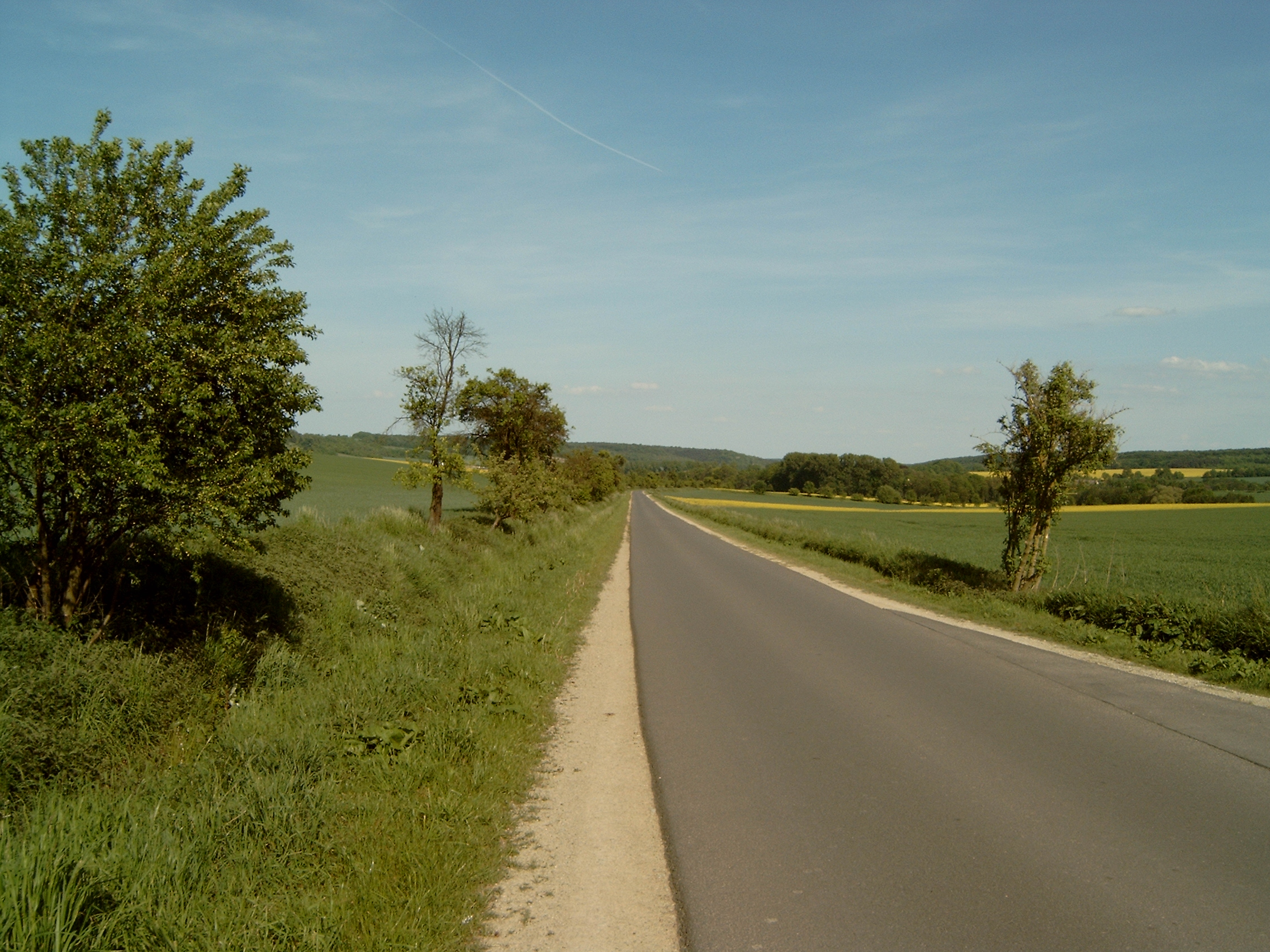
"Alte Poststraße", the old post road between the B 250 und Klosterhäseler

The name An der Poststraße translates as at the post road and is derived from the "old post road" between Leipzig and Kassel. This route was of importance until the "Frankfurt-Leipziger-Chaussee" was rolled out through Eckartsberga, Gernstedt and Kösen in the year 1806.

== Subdistricts ==
The following subdistricts belong to the An der Poststraße municipality:

Subdistrict	Population
Braunsroda (An der Poststraße)	209
Burgheßler	188
Klosterhäseler	328
Frankroda	72
Gößnitz (An der Poststraße)	156
Herrengosserstedt	623
Pleismar	86
Schimmel (An der Poststraße)	50
Wischroda	156
