= Jacques Savary des Brûlons =

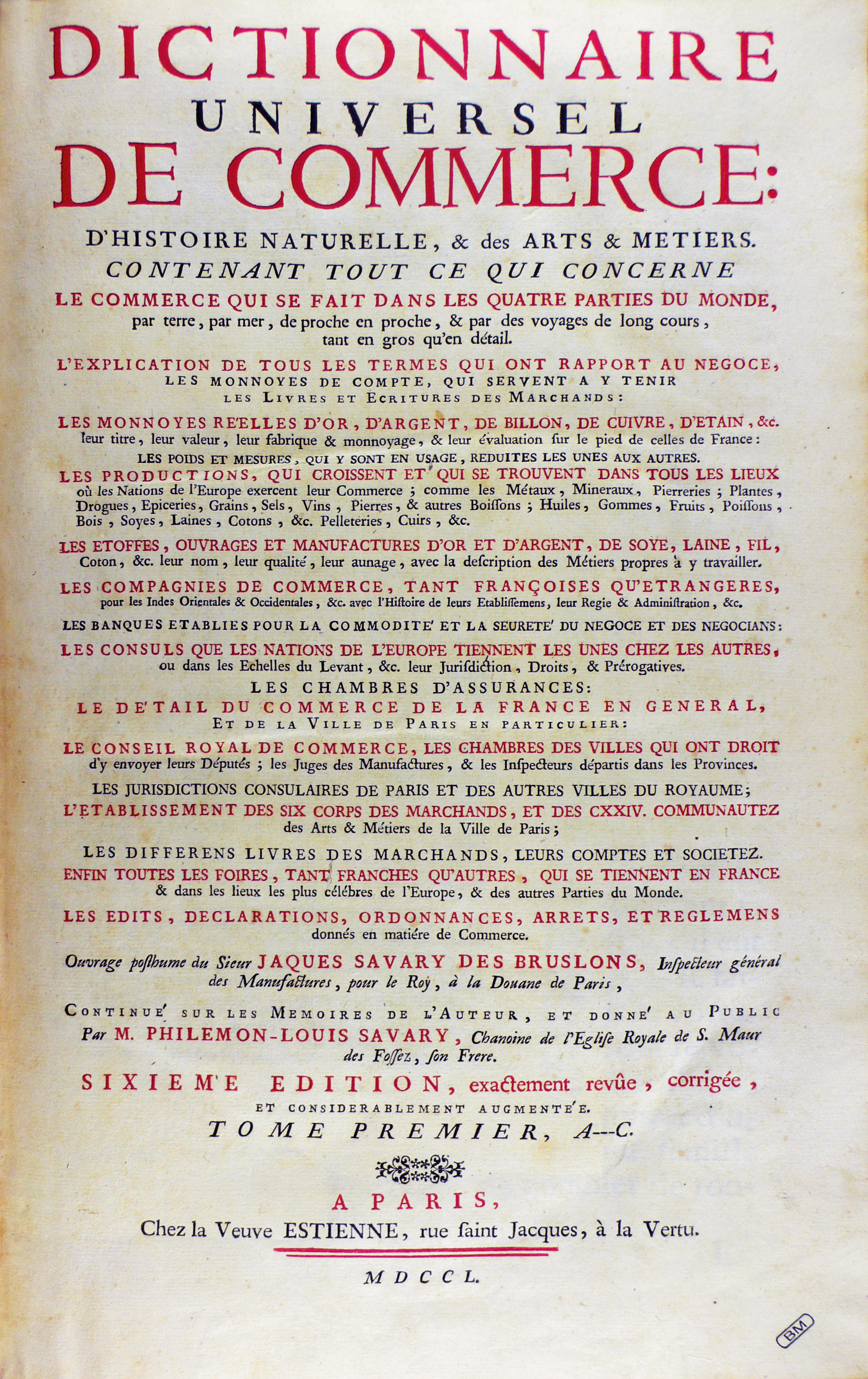
Dictionnaire universel de commerce, 1750 (Milano, Fondazione Mansutti).

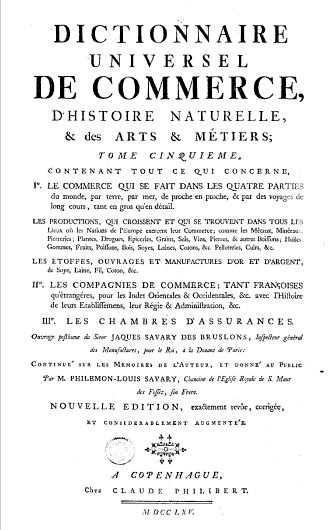
Savary's Dictionnaire Universel, 1765 edition.

Jacques Savary des Brûlons (1657–1716) was the French Inspector General of the Manufactures for the King at the Paris Customs in the 18th century, and a lexicographer who wrote the Dictionnaire universel de commerce.

Jacques Savary des Brûlons was the son of the famous writer on economics Jacques Savary. For his personal use, Savary prepared an alphabetical list of all objects subject to duty, and then of all the words relating to commerce and industry. To this, he added information on the ordinances and rules regarding commerce in France and abroad. This work formed the basis for his Dictionnaire du Commerce, prepared with his brother Louis-Philémon Savary, which was unfinished at the time of his death. Louis-Philémon finished the work and published it in 1723.

Wyndham Beawes published The Merchant's Directory, Being a Compleat Guide to all Men in Business in London in 1751, a work that was largely a translation of the Dictionaire de commerce. Carl Günther Ludovici of Leipzig made a German translation of the Dictionnaire du Commerce. From this work grew a self-written Merchant Lexicon, whose five volumes published by Johann Heinrich Zedler began to appear in 1752 and were completed in 1756. Savary's work was translated and adapted in English by Malachy Postlethwayt in his Universal Dictionary of Trade and Commerce in 1774.

== Works ==
- Dictionnaire universel de commerce: d'histoire naturelle, & des arts & métiers 1723-1730
  - Jacques Savary des Brûlons (1748). Dictionnaire universel de commerce (in French) (New ed.). Paris: Estienne et fils.
