= Johann Gottlieb Siegel =

German legal scholar (1699–1755)

- Born: 25 April 1699; Klosterhäseler, Electorate of Saxony
- Died: 1755 (aged 55–56); Leipzig, Electorate of Saxony
- Occupations: Lawyer, teacher

Johann Gottlieb Siegel (25 April 1699 – 1755) was a German legal scholar.

== Life ==
Gottlieb was born on 25 April 1699 in Klosterhäseler, Saxony-Anhalt, the son of Pastor Johann Georg Siegel (1692–1728) and his wife Amanda Helen Elizabeth, daughter of Johann Gottfried Schuchardt, the Auditor of the dragoons . He attended the Gymnasium Illustre Augusteum in Weissenfels, returning home in 1714.

In 1717, he moved to the University of Leipzig where he attended lectures by Gottfried Polycarp Müller (1685–1747), Lueder Mencke (1658–1726), Johann Christoph Schacher (1667–1720) and Karl Otto Rechenberg (1689–1751). For further studies he went to the University of Wittenberg. The teachers at that time included Karl Jakob Spener (1684–1730), Johannes Balthasar Wernher, Heinrich Christoph Berger, Christian Basti Gebhard Neller, Gottfried Ludwig Mencke the Elder and Michael Heinrich Gribner In Wittenberg, on 29 June 1719 he acquired the Licentiate of the rights, and on 26 August 1720 he graduated as a Doctor of Law.

In 1734 Siegel was an attorney in Leipzig, Saxony at the Leipzig Consistory (for church matters) and the Oberhofgericht (Saxon Supreme Court). On 9 February 1735 he became Professor of feudal law at the Law Faculty of the University of Leipzig, and 1740 he became Counsel of the Leipzig merchants. He was general counsel of the University in 1741 and in the winter semester 1753/54 he was president of the Alma Mater.

Siegel married Anna Catharina, daughter of physician Jakob Schmidt, on 19 May 1722 in Klosterhäseler. He died in 1755 in Leipzig.

== Works ==
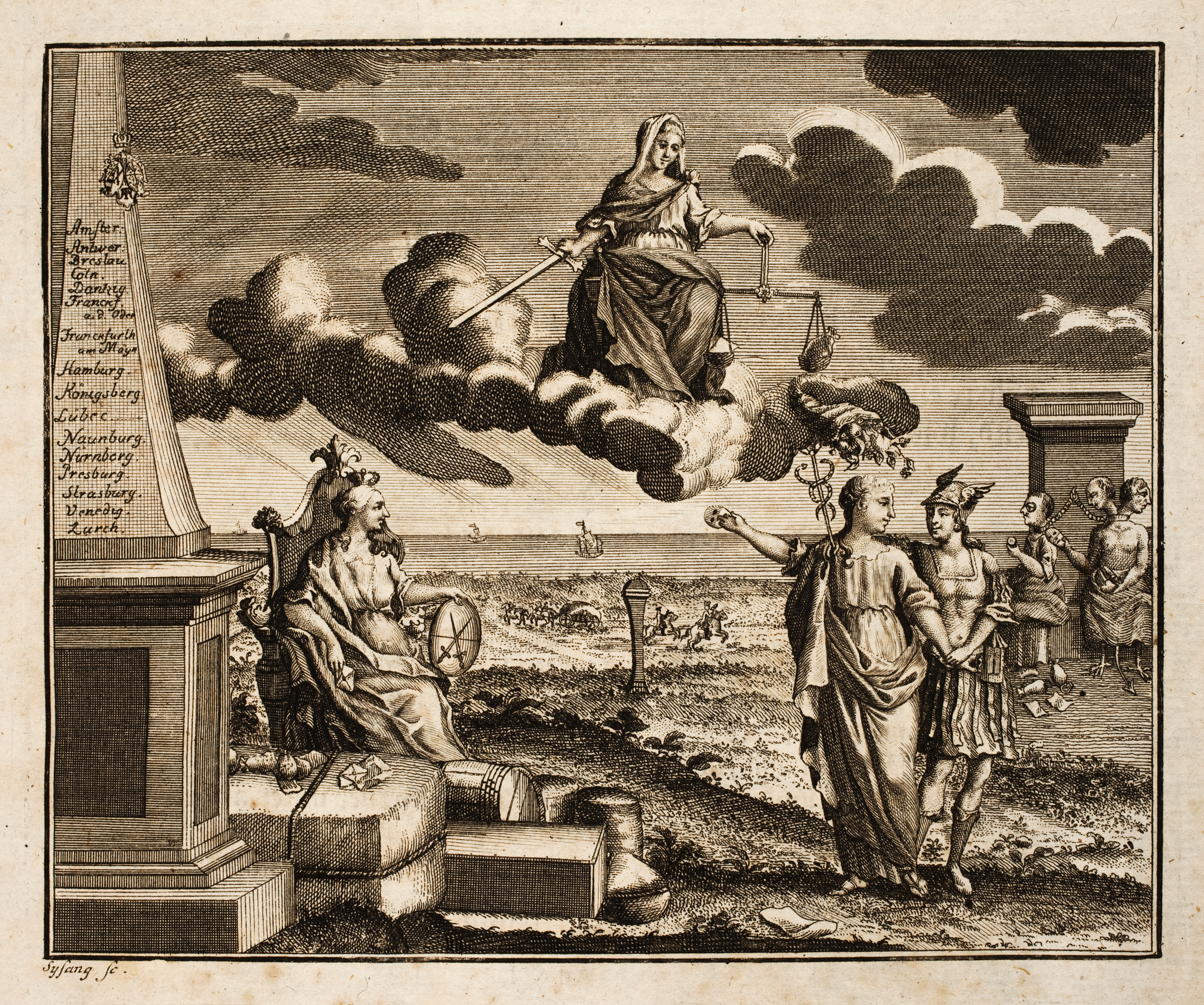
Johann Gottlieb Siegel: Corpus juris cambialis, Leipzig, 1742...1772.

- Diss. (Praes. G. L. Menckenio) de rescissione emtiotionis et venditionis ex tunc et ex nunc (vulgo ut vocant). Leipzig 1719
- Diss. de Indossato reconveniendo. Leipzig 1724
- Diss. de fundamento iudicialis pecuniae deposìtionis in Processu cambiali iure Electorali Saxonico admittendae. Leipzig 1725
- Diss. de creditoribus societatis privatis socii creditoribus non praeferendis. Leipzig 1725
- Progr. an servitus confusione exstinctu fundo serviente rursus alienato reviviscat? Leipzig 1725
- Diss. de legitimo successore hereditatem omitiente actionis funerariae reo. Leipzig 1725
- Diss. de iure congrui in Thuringia; vom Gespielde in Thüringen. Leipzig 1726
- Der vorsichtige Wechsel – Gläubiger. Leipzig 1726
- Diss. de iure pedum: vom Recht der Füsse. Leipzig 1726, 1744
- Diss. de cautione fideicommissorum nomine, praestanda. Leipzig 1728
- Progr. inaug. de litterarum reversalium feudalhim iustitia et nequitate. Leipzig 1735
- Diss. an hypotheca tacita in feudo debito feudali contrahatur? Leipzig 1736
- Diss. prima de litteris feudi reversalibus a simultanee investitis exbibitis; von Lehns – Reversen derer Mitbelehnten. Leipzig 1736, Diss. II. Leipzig 1738
- Diss. de rerum haereditariarum usucapione. Leipzig 1736
- Diss. de testatore suae voluntatis interprete. Leipzig 1737
- Principia iuris feudalis ex iure Imperii, Germanico, Longobardico, atque Electorali Saxonico deprompta, et usui fori accommodata.Leipzig 1738, Editio nova auctior. Leipzig 1746
- Tractatus de litteris investiturarum, von Lehnhbriefen cui varine litterarum investiturarium copiae, variaque praeiudicia novissima in appendice adiecta. Leipzig 1739
- Diss. de arbitrio, ex iuribus Romanis et Germanicis illustrato: von dem Ausspruch derer Schieds – Richter, nach Römisch- und Teutschen Rechten. Leipzig 1739
- Diss. de genuino privilegiorum conceptu. Leipzig 1741
- Diss. de feudo pignoralitio re fundamenti et utilitatis egena: vom Pfand-Lehn, als einer ungegründeten und unnützen Sache. Leipzig 1742
- Corpus iuris cambialis. Leipzig 1742
- Erste Fortfetzung des Corporis iuris cambialis Leipzig 1743
- Diss. de simultanea investitura, sine consensu Vasalli impetrata: von der Mitbelehnschaft, welche ohne des Lehn – Mannes Einwilligung erlanget wird. Leipzig 1743
- Diss. observationes forenses varii argumenti sistens. Leipzig 1745
- Diss. de feudo foemineo proprio. Leipzig 1745
- Diss. de dolo translationem dominii impediente. Leipzig 1748
- Diss. de divisione feudi successionem fimultanee investitorum non restringente. Leipzig 1748
- Diss. exhibens selecta iuris Rigensium cambialis capita explicata, atque observationibus illustrata. Leipzig 1751
- Progr. de iure superficiario reali quidem, ad dominium utile vero haud trahendo. Leipzig 1755
- Diss. de legitima ex feudo petenda. Leipzig 1755
- Progr. de invalida uxoris promissione da iurata SCti Vellejani renunciatione. Leipzig 1754
- Progr. de differentia inter feudum haereditarium in foeminas transitorium et foemineum. Leipzig 1754
