= Klosterhäseler =

- Ortsteil of An der Poststraße
- Interactive map of Klosterhäseler
- Location within Germany Location within Saxony-Anhalt
- Coordinates: 51°10′N 11°37′E
- Country: Germany
- State: Saxony-Anhalt
- District: Burgenlandkreis
- Town: An der Poststraße

Area
  - Total: 19.90 km^{2} (7.68 sq mi)
- Elevation: 196 m (643 ft)

Population (2006-12-31)
  - Total: 783
  - Density: 39.3/km^{2} (102/sq mi)
- Time zone: UTC+01:00 (CET)
  - Summer (DST): UTC+02:00 (CEST)
- Postal codes: 06647
- Dialling codes: 034463, 034465, 034467

Klosterhäseler is a village in southern Saxony-Anhalt, Germany, and part of the municipality An der Poststraße. It has about 317 inhabitants. The village is known for its baroque church dating from 1766 and for a local organ-building tradition associated with the Heerwagen family.

== Gallery ==
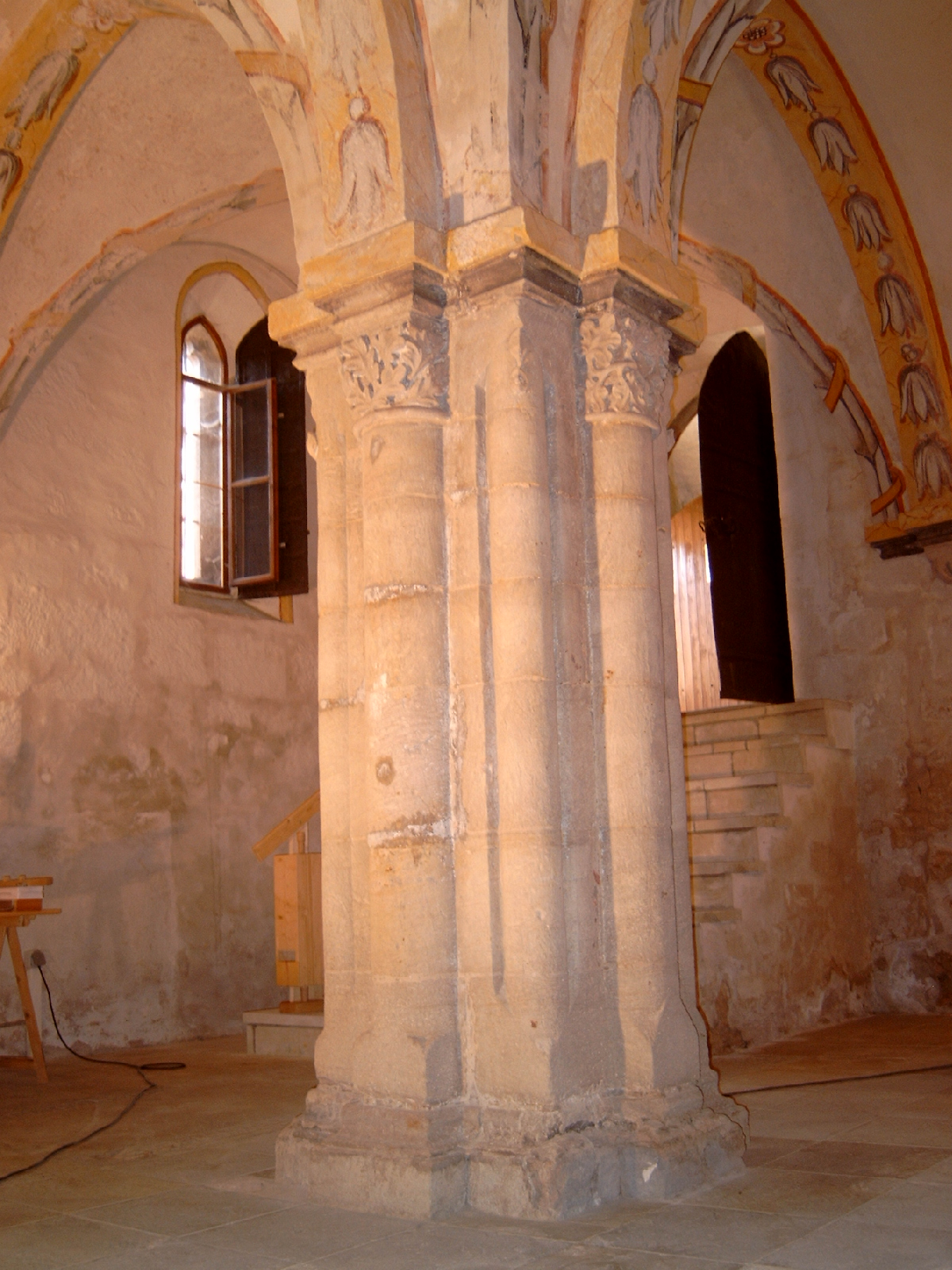
Central column of the crypt of the former Cistercian nunnery in Klosterhäseler
