= Grosses vollständiges Universal-Lexicon =

German encyclopedia

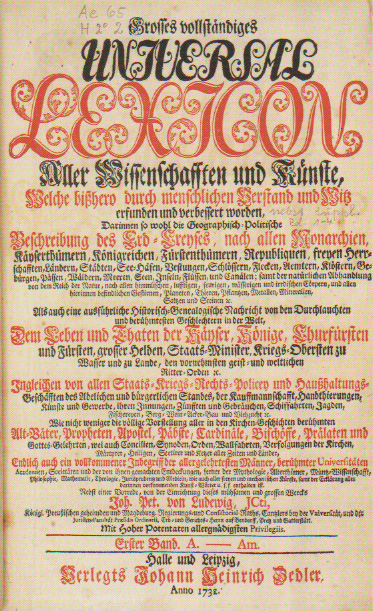
Zedler's Universal-Lexicon is considered the most important German-language encyclopedia of the 18th Century. Contrary to the claim on the title page shown here, the first volume had already appeared at the Leipzig Michaelmas Fair of 1731.

The Grosses vollständiges Universal-Lexicon aller Wissenschafften und Künste (English: Great Complete Encyclopedia of All Sciences and Arts) is a German encyclopedia published by Johann Heinrich Zedler between 1731 and 1754. At 68-volumes it is among the largest print encyclopedias ever made, and the first to systematically include biographies of living people.

== Title ==
The bookseller and publisher Zedler published this book in Leipzig under the name:

Great Complete Encyclopedia of All Sciences and Arts Which So Far Have Been Invented and Improved by Human Mind and Wit: Including the Geographical and Political Description of the Whole World with All Monarchies, Empires, Kingdoms, Principalities, Republics, Free Sovereignties, Countries, Towns, Sea Harbors, Fortresses, Castles, Areas, Authorities, Monasteries, Mountains, Passes, Woods, Seas, Lakes ... and also a Detailed Historical and Genealogical Description of the World's Brightest and Most Famous Family Lines, the Life and Deeds of the Emperors, Kings, Electors and Princes, Great Heroes, Ministers of State, War Leaders... ; Equally about All Policies of State, War and Law and Budgetary Business of the Nobility and the Bourgeois, Merchants, Traders, Arts.

Zedler himself called his encyclopedia "Zedler's Encyclopedia" (Zedlersches Lexikon). Many previous encyclopedias were associated with the names of their authors, but the Universal Lexicon was the first to be associated with the name of its publisher.

== Editors ==
The main editors were Jacob August Franckenstein (volumes 1-2), Paul Daniel Longolius (volumes 3-18), and Carl Günther Ludovici (volumes 19-64 and supplements). Each seems to have taken a different approach to encyclopedia-making. From volume 18 onward, for example, the encyclopedia contains numerous biographies of living people, presumably because of Ludovici's appointment as editor around the same time.

In his introduction to volume 1, Zedler himself claimed to have had the encyclopedia compiled by nine anonymous "muses." Scholars continue to debate over how many or few collaborators he actually had. In fact, almost nothing certain is known about the individual authors of the encyclopedia. Heinrich Winkler wrote many medical articles, and Friedrich August Müller probably wrote articles on philosophy. Lorenz Christoph Mizler (1711–1778) claimed to have written mathematical articles. Johann Heinrich Rother and Johann Christoph Gottsched have also been suggested as possible collaborators, though both denied it.

== Printing ==
The Grosses vollständiges Universal-Lexicon is sometimes considered the first modern encyclopedia in the German language. At the time, it was the largest printed encyclopedia in the Western world, and it remains one of the largest. It was originally supposed to be printed in about 12 volumes, an estimate later extended to 24, but it was finally printed in 64 volumes plus four supplements, with about 284,000 articles on 63,000 two-column pages. Ludovici had even intended to write a further four supplements.

Initial production was funded through subscription, where buyers paid in advance and received a discount on the volume that was later delivered. The press run of the Universal Lexicon was undoubtedly small. Scholars have estimated that only around 1500 sets were printed. Early letters such as A, B, and C composed 2-volumes each, while later letters were larger, for example Z had 4 volumes, reflecting a publication strategy where loyal subscribers would buy whatever was required to complete the collection.

Zedler arranged to have the encyclopedia printed in the Halle Waisenhaus ("orphanage"), not far from Leipzig. This print shop belonged to August Hermann Francke's Francke Foundations.

Later, between 1961 and 1964, the book was republished in Graz, Austria.

== Online copy ==
The Bavarian State Library's digitisation center in Munich (Münchener Digitalisierungszentrum, MDZ) has digitized the encyclopedia completely, including the four supplements, in the form of images and PDF files. The 68 volumes have an index and readers can browse through the pages.
