= Praenumeration =

Form of the subscription business model

Praenumeration (German: Pränumeration) was an early form of the subscription business model. It was a common business practice in the 18th century book trade in Germany. The publisher offered to sell a book that was planned but had not yet been printed, usually at a discount, so as to cover their costs in advance. The business practice was particularly common with magazines, helping to determine in advance how many subscribers there would be.

For example, when Johann Heinrich Zedler decided to issue a collection of works of Martin Luther he advertised that the book would be for sale through praenumeration at the Leipzig Easter Fair in 1728, with the first volume to be available at the following Michaelmas Fair in early October. When the eleventh and final volume was issued in 1733, Zedler found himself in difficulty. He had been using praenumeration payments for the future volumes to pay the bills for previous volumes, and now the last bills were due with no future payments to cover them.

== See also ==
- Crowdfunding, 21st-century version
