= Johann Friedrich Gleditsch =

German publisher

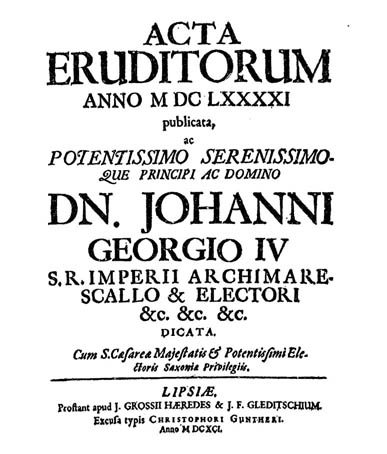
Title page of Johann Friedrich Gleditsch's Leipzig publication Acta Eruditorum

Johann Friedrich Gleditsch (15 August 1653 – 26 March 1716) was a major book publisher in the late 17th and early 18th centuries.

== Early career ==
Gleditsch was born in Eschendorf, near Pirna, on 15 August 1653, son of pastor Georg Gleditsch (1615–65) and his wife Catherine (née Nikolai, 1624–1671). After his father died when he was young, he attended the Thomas School in Leipzig. For financial reasons, he began to work for Elert Schumacher, a bookseller in Wittenberg, working as an assistant there until 1680. In 1681 he joined the publishing business of the late John Frederick Fritsch, whose widow Catarina Margaretha he married in November 1681. In the following years he developed the already prestigious company into a prominent scientific publisher, famous mainly for the publication in Leipzig of the Acta Eruditorum. He brought out the first issue of this work in cooperation with the great Erben publishing house in 1682.

== Independent publisher ==
At the end of 1693 Gledistch handed the business over to his stepson, Thomas Fritsch, and founded his own publishing bookshop. Within a few years this enterprise became important as well, excelling in lavish publications. These included the main history of the Reformation, Seckendorff's Commentarius de Lutheranismo, Ziegler's Schauplatz und Labyrinth, Lohenstein's Arminius and the major biblical and theological works of Johann Tarnow (Tarnovius), Salomo Glassius, Benedikt Carpzov der Jüngere and Valerius Herberger.

Gledistch and his brother Johann Ludwig, stepfather of Moritz Georg Weidmann, persuaded the leading Dutch booksellers to send their works to the Leipzig fair instead of to Frankfurt, a major breakthrough for the book trade in the city. In addition to the great authors, Gleditsch achieved success in the two key growth sectors of the book market of the early 18th Century: encyclopedias and journals. He published John Huebner's Reale Staats-und Zeitungs-Lexicon (States and places lexicon) (1704), which with a supplementary volume published in 1712 became the indispensable reference when reading to the newspapers. It allowed people to look up places and countries that were named without explanation in the papers, as was the convention of the day.

From the encyclopedias of Gottlieb Siegmund Corvinus (alias Amaranthe), he compiled the Woman's Lexicon (1715). Among the journals he published Acta Eruditorum in Latin, supplemented in 1712 by the German Acta Eruditorum, from which the leading review of historical writings developed. Gleditsch's companies created their synergy effects. Books published by the Gledisch were often discussed and promoted by his journals.

Gleditsch died, aged 62, in Leipzig.
