= 1700s (decade) =

Decade

The 1700s decade ran from January 1, 1700, to December 31, 1709.

The decade is marked by a shift in the political structure of the Indian subcontinent, and the decline of the Mughal Empire.

== Events ==
=== 1700 ===
==== January–March ====
- January 1 – Protestant nations in Western Europe, except England, start using the Gregorian calendar. Catholic nations have been using the Gregorian calendar since its introduction in 1582 by Pope Gregory XIII.
- January 1 (Julian) (January 11, Gregorian) – The Tsardom of Russia begins numbering its calendar from the birth of Christ (Anno Domini), instead of since the Creation (Anno Mundi).
- January 26 – At approximately 9 p.m., the Cascadia earthquake occurs in the Pacific Northwest, with an estimated moment magnitude of 8.7–9.2. This megathrust earthquake ruptures about 1,000 kilometers (620 miles) of the Cascadia Subduction Zone and causes a tsunami that strikes the coast of Japan approximately 10 hours later.
- February 3 – The 'Lesser Great Fire' destroys a substantial part of central Edinburgh, Scotland.
- February 12 – The Great Northern War begins with a joint invasion of Swedish territory in Germany and Latvia, by Denmark and Poland/Saxony. Sweden has control of the Baltic Sea and holds territory that includes Finland, Estonia, Latvia and parts of northern Germany. To challenge its power, an alliance is formed between Tsar Peter I of Russia, King Frederick IV of Denmark and Augustus II the Strong, King of Poland and Elector of Saxony. Sweden's ruler is the militaristic Charles XII, known as the "Swedish Meteor".
- February 27 – The island of New Britain is discovered by William Dampier, in the western Pacific.
- March 1 (Gregorian) – Protestant Germany and Denmark–Norway adopt the Gregorian calendar.
- March 1 (Swedish), March 11 (Gregorian), February 29 (Julian) – The Swedish calendar is adopted.
- March (early) – William Congreve's comedy The Way of the World is first performed in London.
- March 3 – Shivaji II accedes to the throne of the Maratha Empire as the 4th Chhatrapati after his father Rajaram I's death.
- March 24 – The Treaty of London is signed between France, England and the Dutch Republic.

==== April–June ====
- April 15 – The coronation of King Frederick IV of Denmark takes place at Frederiksborg Castle in Copenhagen.
- April 18 – Hungarian freedom activist Ferenc Rákóczi is arrested by Austrian authorities and charged with sedition. Imprisoned near Vienna and facing a death sentence, he escapes and later leads the overthrow of the Habsburg control of Hungary.
- April 21 – In India, the siege of the fortress of Sajjangad (located in the Maharashtra state) is begun by an army led by Fateullahakhan. The fortress falls on June 6.
- April – Fire destroys many buildings in Gondar, the capital of Ethiopia, including two in the palace complex.
- May 5 – Within a few days of poet John Dryden's death in London (May 1 O.S.), his last written work (The Secular Masque) is performed as part of Vanbrugh's version of The Pilgrim.
- May – In Rhode Island (American colony), Walter Clarke, three-term former Governor of the Colony of Rhode Island and Providence Plantations, is elected deputy governor for the second time, serving under his brother-in-law Samuel Cranston.
- June 8 (May 28 O.S.) – The legislature for the Province of Massachusetts Bay (the modern-day Commonwealth of Massachusetts in the United States) passes into law "An Act against Jesuits & Popish Priests" making a finding that Roman Catholic clerics have attempted to incite American Indians into a rebellion against the Crown, and declaring "That all and every Jesuit, Seminary Priest, Missionary, or other Spiritual or Ecclesiastical Person made or ordained by any Authority, Power or Jurisdiction derived, challenged or pretended from the Pope or See of Rome, now residing within this Province or any part thereof, shall depart from and out of the same, at or before the tenth day of September next, in this present year, One Thousand and Seven Hundred." The Province of New York enacts similar legislation later in the year.

==== July–September ====
- July 11 – The Prussian Academy of Sciences is founded, with Gottfried Leibniz as president.
- July 24 – Charles XII of Sweden counter-attacks his enemies by invading Zealand (Denmark), assisted by an Anglo-Dutch naval squadron under Sir George Rooke, rapidly compelling the Danes to submit to peace.
- July 30 – Eleven-year-old Prince William, Duke of Gloucester, dies of "a malignant fever" at Windsor Castle, leaving the Protestant succession to the British throne in doubt.
- August 18 (August 7 O.S.) – The Peace of Travendal is concluded between the Swedish Empire, Denmark–Norway and Holstein-Gottorp in Traventhal. On the same day, Augustus II, King of Poland, and Peter the Great, Tsar of Russia, enter the war against Sweden.
- September 6 – Edmond Halley returns to England after a voyage of almost one year on HMS Paramour, from which he has observed the Antarctic Convergence, and publishes his findings on terrestrial magnetism in General Chart of the Variation of the Compass.
- September 12 – Antioh Cantemir is deposed as the voivode of Moldavia and replaced by his predecessor Constantine Ducas.
- September 13-14 – The Rising-sun hurricane of 1700 strikes the coast of South Carolina, killing 98.
- September 27 – Pope Innocent XII dies at the age of 85 after a tenure of more than nine years. Fabrizio Spada, the Cardinal Secretary of State, assumes administration of the Roman Catholic Church in order to oversee the election of a new Pope.
- September – A Russian army invades Swedish Estonia, and besieges the town of Narva.

==== October–December ====
- October 3 – The Battle of Jouami' al-Ulama takes place in Algeria with a surprise attack and ambush on the army of Murad III Bey of Tunis by two Algerian defenders, Hadj Mustapha, Dey of Algiers and Ahmed ben Ferhat, Beylik of Constantine.
- October 16 – Adrian, Patriarch of All Russia, dies after more than 10 years as head of the Russian Orthodox Church. He is replaced by the hand-picked choice of Tsar Peter the Great with the appointment of Simeon Ivanovich Yavorsky as Patriarch Stefan.
- November 1 – Charles II, the last Spanish king of the House of Habsburg, dies at the Royal Alcazar of Madrid aged 38, leaving no children; his last will makes Philip of Anjou his heir.
- November 15 – Louis XIV of France accepts the Spanish crown on behalf of his grandson Philip of Anjou of the House of Bourbon, who becomes Philip V of Spain (reigning for 44 years – with a short break – to 1746), thus triggering the War of the Spanish Succession (1701–1714).
- November 18 – Lithuanian Civil War: Battle of Valkininkai – The anti-Sapieha coalition is victorious.
- November 23 – Cardinal Giovanni Francesco Albani, having been ordained as a Roman Catholic priest only two months earlier, is elected by the Papal conclave to succeed Pope Innocent XII, and becomes the 243rd pope, taking the name of Clement XI.

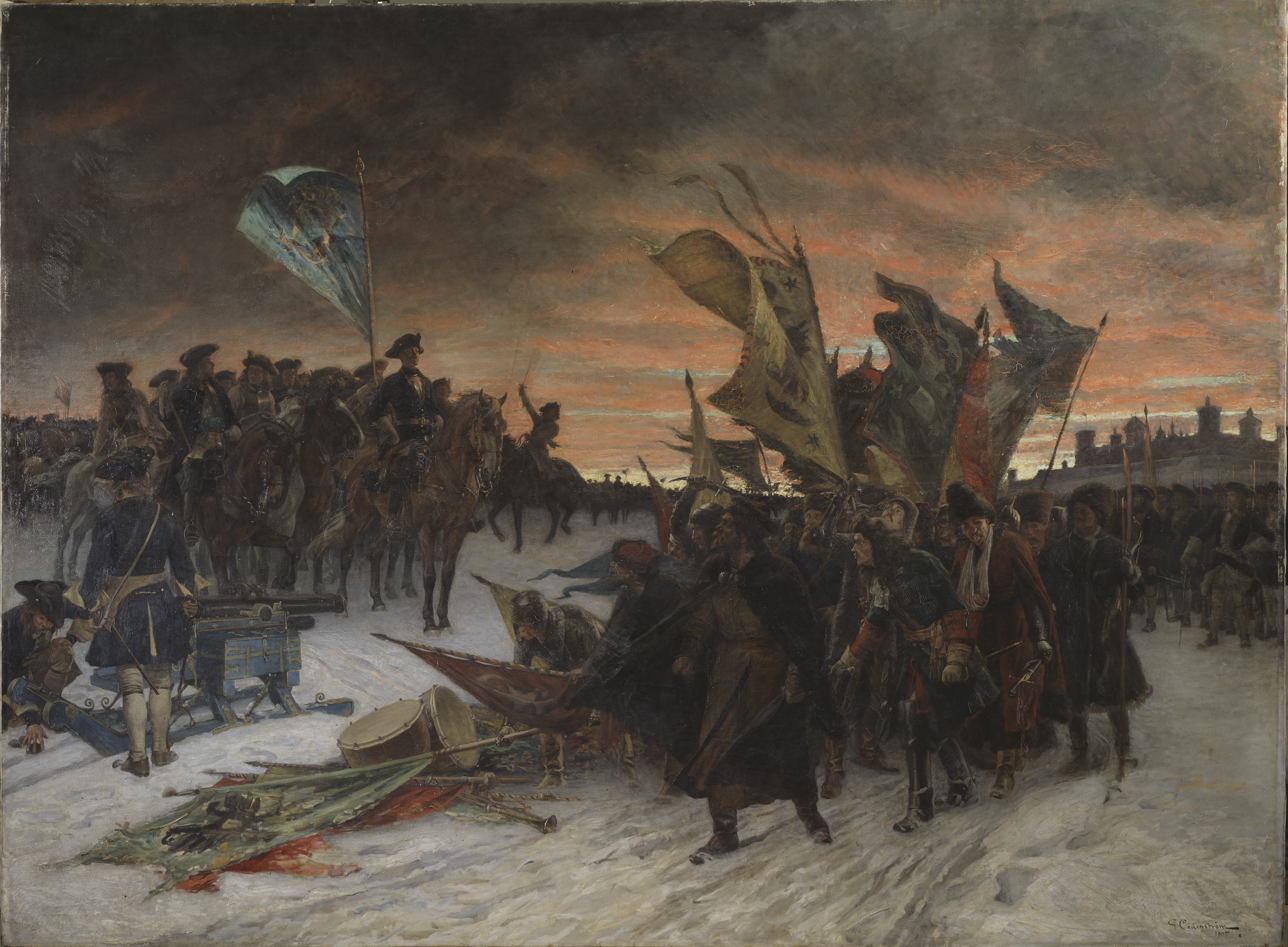
November 30: Battle of Narva

- November 30 (November 19 O.S.; November 20 Swedish calendar) – Battle of Narva in Estonia: Having led his army of 8,000 on a forced march from Denmark to Estonia, Charles XII of Sweden routs the huge Russian army.
- December 8 – The formal coronation of Pope Clement XI takes place in Rome.
- December 28 – Laurence Hyde, 1st Earl of Rochester, Lord President of the Council in charge of the Privy Council, is appointed to the additional job of Lord Lieutenant of Ireland, the highest Crown official in charge of administration of Ireland.
- December 30 (December 19, O.S.) – The 4th Parliament of King William III in England is dissolved and new elections are ordered by the King.

==== Date unknown ====
- Mission San Xavier del Bac is founded in New Spain near Tucson, as a Spanish Roman Catholic mission. Its location had first been scouted by the Spanish in 1692.
- An inventory made for the House of Medici of Florence is the first documentary evidence for a piano, invented by their instrument keeper Bartolomeo Cristofori.
- An English translation of the novel Don Quixote, "translated from the original by many hands and published by Peter Motteux", begins publication in London. While popular among readers, it will eventually come to be known as one of the worst translations of the novel, totally betraying the spirit of Miguel de Cervantes's masterpiece.
- The value of sales of English manufactured products to the Atlantic economy is £3.9 million.
- Approximate date – Lions become extinct in Libya.

=== 1701 ===
==== January–June ====
- January 18 – The electorate of Brandenburg-Prussia becomes the Kingdom of Prussia, as Elector Frederick III is proclaimed King Frederick I. Prussia remains part of the Holy Roman Empire. It consists of Brandenburg, Pomerania and East Prussia. Berlin is the capital.
- January 28 – Battle of Dartsedo: The Chinese storm the Tibetan border town of Dartsedo.
- February 17 (February 6, 1700 O.S.) – The 5th Parliament of William III in England assembles. Future British Prime Minister Robert Walpole enters the House of Commons for the first time and soon makes his name as a spokesman for Whig policy.
- April 20th – Mecklenburg-Strelitz is created as a north German duchy.
- June 9 – Safavid troops retreat from Basra, ending a three year occupation.

==== April–June ====
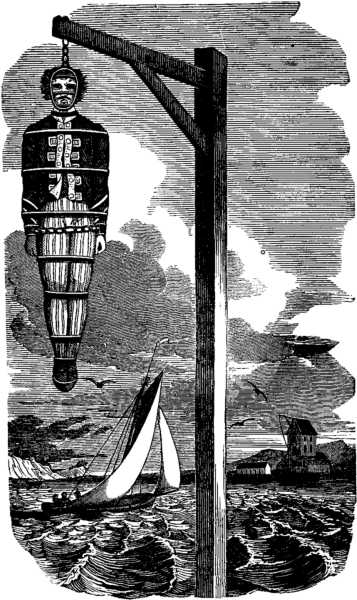
Pirate captain William Kidd is gibbeted in London.

- April 21 – In Japan, the young daimyō Asano Naganori is ordered to commit seppuku (ritual suicide). A group of 47 samurai of his service begin planning to avenge his death.
- May 23 – Scottish-born Captain William Kidd, having been imprisoned in Boston Gaol (Massachusetts) and Newgate Prison (London) and convicted by the High Court of Admiralty of piracy and the murder of one of his crew, is hanged at Execution Dock in Wapping (London). His body suffers gibbeting over the River Thames at Tilbury Point; ballads are already spreading the legend that he has left buried treasure in the Americas.
- June 24 – The Act of Settlement 1701 is passed by the Parliament of England, to exclude the Catholic Stuarts from the British monarchy. Under its terms, King William III, childless, will be succeeded by Queen Mary II's sister Princess Anne and her descendants. If Anne should have no descendants, she will be succeeded by Sophia of Hanover and her descendants (hence the Hanoverian Succession in 1714).

==== July–September ====
- July 9 – The Battle of Carpi, the first skirmish in the War of the Spanish Succession, takes place in Italy when French troops under the command of Nicolas Catinat are attacked by Austrian forces led by Prince Eugene of Savoy.
- July 19 – Crossing of the Düna: Following his victories over Denmark-Norway and Russia in 1700, Charles XII of Sweden escalates the conflict in the Great Northern War by an invasion of Poland. The Swedish defeat the army of Saxony (then in personal union with Poland) at the River Dvina.

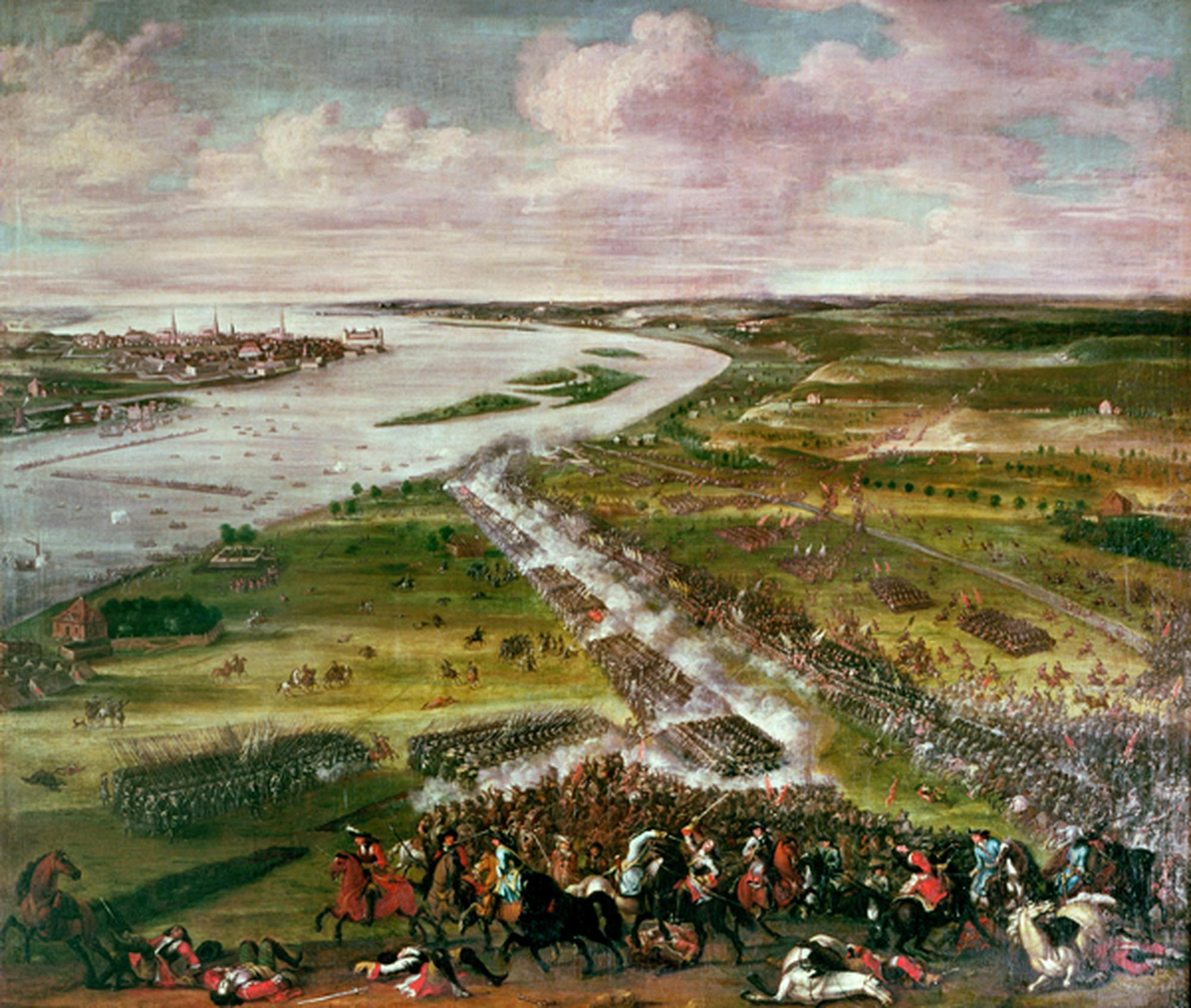
July 9: Crossing of the Düna.

- July 24 – A French emporium named Fort Ponchartrain is founded along the west side of the Detroit River in North America, and later becomes the site of the city of Detroit.
- August 4 – The Great Peace of Montreal is signed, ending 100 years of war between the Iroquois Confederacy and New France, and its Huron and Algonquian allies. Formerly allied with the English, the treaty assures the Iroquois will be neutral, if France and England ever resume hostilities.
- September 16 – Deposed King James II of England (James VII of Scotland) dies in exile, at the Château de Saint-Germain-en-Laye in France. His supporters, the Jacobites, turn to his son James Francis Edward Stuart (later called "The Old Pretender"), whom they recognise as James VIII and III. Louis XIV of France, the Papal States and Spain also recognise him as the rightful heir.

==== October–December ====
- October 9 – The Collegiate School of Connecticut (later renamed Yale University) is chartered in Old Saybrook, Connecticut.
- November 2 – King Philip V of Spain marries for the first time, to 13-year-old Maria Luisa Gabriella of Savoy, who serves as Queen Consort until her death from tuberculosis at the age of 25.
- November 11 (O.S., November 22 N.S.) – The House of Commons of England is dissolved by King William III and new elections are called for all 531 seats.
- December 29 (O.S., January 9, 1702 N.S.) – The Battle of Erastfer takes place near what becomes Erastvere in Estonia, as a large Russian force commanded by Boris Sheremetev invades Swedish Livonia and overwhelms a smaller force led by Wolmar Anton von Schlippenbach in the first significant Russian victory in the Great Northern War.

==== Date unknown ====
- English agriculturalist Jethro Tull invents a drill for planting seeds in rows.
- The Philharmonic Society (Academia Philharmonicorum) is established in Ljubljana, Slovenia.

=== 1702 ===
==== January–March ====
- January 2 – A total solar eclipse is visible from the southern Pacific Ocean.
- January 12 – In North America, ships from Fort Maurepas arrive at Twenty-Seven Mile Bluff to build Fort Louis de la Mobile (future Mobile, Alabama), to become the capital of French Louisiana.
- February 1 – War of the Spanish Succession – Battle of Cremona: The Duc de Villeroy, commander of the French Army, is taken as a prisoner of war by the Austrian Army.
- March 3 (February 20 O.S.) – King William III of England is fatally injured in an accident when he is thrown from his horse, "Sorrel", when it trips on a molehill in Hampton Court Park near London. Already in poor health before the accident, he dies from complications 16 days later at the age of 51.
- March 14 – An earthquake in the middle of the Calore valley in Italy, east of Benevento, kills 400 people.
- March 19 (March 8 Old Style) – Princess Anne Stuart, daughter of the late King James II and younger sister of his successor, Mary II of England (who had reigned jointly with her husband, William III, as William and Mary until her death in 1694), ascends the English, Scottish and Irish thrones upon William's death. In her first speech to the English Parliament, made three days later, she tells the assembly "As I know my heart to be entirely English, I can very sincerely assure you there is not anything you can expect or desire from me which I shall not be ready to do for the happiness and prosperity of England." Anne is the mother of 17 children by her husband, Prince George of Denmark and Norway, but none will survive childhood, and she will die without an heir, bringing an end to the reign of the House of Stuart and enabling the Hanoverian Succession. After the death of William, the States General of the Netherlands do not appoint a new stadtholder, and so the Dutch Republic becomes a true republic again, starting the Second Stadtholderless Period.
- March 22 (March 11 Old Style) – The first regular English-language national newspaper, The Daily Courant, begins publication on Fleet Street in the City of London, initially by Elizabeth Mallet; it covers only foreign news.
- March 24 – Great Northern War: Battle of Darsūniškis – The Swedish army of about 240 men under the command of Alexander Hummerhielm is defeated by the Polish–Saxon army of 6,000 men under Michał Serwacy Wiśniowiecki.

==== April–June ====
- April 3 – The Dutch East India Company ship Merestein strikes rocks and sinks in Saldanha Bay off Jutten Island, Africa with the loss of 101 of the 200 people on board.
- April 14 – Volcanic eruption of Changbaishan volcano (also known as Paektu Mountain) on the China/Korea border takes place.
- April 15 – The British Province of New Jersey, encompassing all of the modern-day U.S. state of New Jersey and portions of New York, is created as proprietary owners in the provinces of East Jersey and West Jersey surrender their rights to the Crown.
- April 20 – Comet C/1702 H1 is discovered and passes within 0.0435 AU (a little more than four million miles or 6.5 million km) of the Earth.
- April 24 – The first two missionaries from the Society for the Propagation of the Gospel in Foreign Parts set sail from England to North America.
- May 5 – Globular cluster Messier 5 (M5, NGC 5904) is discovered by Gottfried Kirch and his wife Maria Margarethe.
- May 6 – Cloudesley Shovell is promoted to full admiral in the English navy.
- May 14 (N.S.) – War of the Spanish Succession: War is declared on France by the Grand Alliance (Kingdom of England, Dutch Republic and Holy Roman Empire).
- May 15 (May 4 O.S.) – King Charles XII of Sweden and his troops walk unopposed into Warsaw after troops capture the city.
- May 16 – Much of the city of Uppsala, Sweden is destroyed in a fire.
- May 19 – Over 90% of the city of Bergen, Norway is destroyed and reduced to ashes in a Great Fire.
- June 2 – English General John Churchill, later the Duke of Marlborough, takes command of the alliance of English, Dutch and German troops in the War of the Spanish Succession.
- June 11 – Anglo-Dutch forces skirmish with French forces before the walls of Nijmegen and prevent its fall.
- June 15 – Queen Anne's Captain-General, John Churchill, forces the surrender of Kaiserswerth on the Rhine after a siege that began on April 18.
- June 16 – The English East India Company founds a settlement on Pulo Condore (modern-day Côn Sơn Island) off the coast of southern Vietnam as an entrepôt for ships travelling between India and China.
- June 25 – The premiere of the opera L'Offendere per amore overo la Telesilla by Johann Joseph Fux takes place in Vienna.

==== July–September ====
- July 19 (July 8 O.S.; July 9 Swedish calendar) – Great Northern War: Battle of Klissow – Charles XII of Sweden decisively defeats the Polish–Lithuanian-Saxon army.
- July 23 – The first performance of the opera Médus, roi des Mèdes by François Bouvard takes place at the Paris Opera.
- July 24
  - Camisard hostilities begin in France with the assassination at le Pont-de-Montvert of a local embodiment of royal oppression, François Langlade, the Abbé of Chaila.
  - A total eclipse of the sun is visible on a path crossing the northern Pacific Ocean and Central America.
- July 30 (July 19 O.S.; July 20 Swedish calendar) – Great Northern War: Battle of Hummelshof – Russia defeats Sweden.
- August 11 – Great Northern War: Częstochowa, Poland, is captured by the Swedish army.
- August 15 – War of the Spanish Succession: Battle of Luzzara – Forces of the Holy Roman Empire fail to break through the French-Savoyard position in Lombardy.
- September 12 – The Siege of Landau (War of the Spanish Succession) ends after 3 months with forces of the Holy Roman Empire capturing the fortress town in the Rhineland-Palatinate from a French garrison.
- September 19 – Jupiter occults Neptune.
- September 25 – General John Churchill forces the surrender of Venlo on the Meuse River.
- September 30 – War of the Spanish Succession: Battle of Cádiz – A month-long Anglo-Dutch amphibious operation under English Admiral Sir George Rooke fails to take the Spanish port.

==== October–December ====
- October 1 – The founding deed of the University of Wrocław is signed by the Holy Roman Emperor Leopold I of the House of Austria, King of Hungary and Bohemia.
- October 7 – Great Northern War: Russian troops besiege the Swedish fortress of Nöteborg, and capture it after 15 days.
- October 14 – War of the Spanish Succession: Battle of Friedlingen – France defeats forces of the Holy Roman Empire.
- October 18 – Queen Anne's War: Battle of Flint River – Spanish and Apalachee Indian forces fail in their attack against Creek Indians, supported by English traders, in the modern-day U.S. state of Georgia.
- October 19 – The opera Der Sieg der fruchtbaren Pomona by Reinhard Keiser is premiered at the Hamburg Opera for the birthday of King Frederick IV of Denmark.
- October 23 – War of the Spanish Succession:
  - Battle of Vigo Bay – Anglo-Dutch naval forces under English Admiral Sir George Rooke capture the defended Spanish port of Cádiz and take or destroy all the Spanish treasure fleet and escorting French warships there.
  - Churchill forces the surrender of Liège.
- October 27 – Queen Anne's War in North America: English troops plunder St. Augustine, Spanish Florida.
- October 28 – Sieur Juchereau, Lieutenant General of Montréal, establishes the first trading post on the Wabash River in order to trade buffalo hides with American Indians. The site of the trading post may be the modern-day location of Vincennes, Indiana.
- November 7 – The first performance of the opera Tancrède by André Campra takes place at the Théâtre du Palais-Royal in Paris.
- November 10 – Queen Anne's War in North America: The Siege of St. Augustine opens as English forces besiege St. Augustine, Spanish Florida.
- November 15 – The opera La Clemenza d'Augusto by Johann Joseph Fux is premiered in Vienna.
- November 22 – The Dutch East India Company ship Amsterdam (1691) founders en route from Bombay to Basra during a storm with the loss of all hands.
- December 14 – John Churchill is created duke of Marlborough.
- December 30 – Queen Anne's War: The Siege of St. Augustine in Spanish Florida is lifted.

==== Date unknown ====
- The travel diary Oku no Hosomichi ("Narrow road to the deep north"), a major work of haibun by the Japanese poet Matsuo Bashō and one of the major texts of Japanese literature of the Edo period, is published eight years after Bashō's death.
- The Delaware Colony legislature is separated from that of Pennsylvania.
- Richard Bentley at Cambridge in England introduces the first written (as opposed to oral) competitive examinations in a Western university.

=== 1703 ===
December 7: The Great Storm of 1703 strikes Britain (November 26 by the calendar in use locally)

==== January–March ====
- January 9 – The Jamaican town of Port Royal, a center of trade in the Western Hemisphere and at this time the largest city in the Caribbean, is destroyed by a fire. British ships in the harbor are able to rescue much of the merchandise that has been unloaded on the docks, but the inventory in market-places in town is destroyed.
- January 14 – 1703 Apennine earthquakes: The magnitude 6.7 Norcia earthquake affects Central Italy with a maximum Mercalli intensity of XI (Extreme). With a death toll of 6,240–9,761, it is the first in a sequence of three destructive events.
- January 16 – 1703 Apennine earthquakes: The magnitude 6.2 Montereale earthquake causes damage at Accumoli, Armatrice, Cittareale and Montereale, with a maximum Mercalli intensity of VIII (Severe).
- January 30 (December 14 of previous year in the Chinese calendar) – Akō incident: In Japan, forty-seven rōnin (independent samurai) assassinate daimyō Kira Yoshinaka, the enemy of their former lord Asano Naganori, at his own mansion as a vengeance; for which they are compelled to commit suicide on March 20.
- February 2 – 1703 Apennine earthquakes: The magnitude 6.7 L'Aquila earthquake affects Central Italy, with a maximum Mercalli intensity of X (Extreme). In the final large event (an example of Coulomb stress transfer), damage occurs as far distant as Rome, with landslides, liquefaction, slope failures and at least 2,500 deaths.
- February 20–March 10 – War of the Spanish Succession: Siege of Kehl – French forces under the command of the Duc de Villars capture the fortress of the Holy Roman Empire at Kehl, opposite Strasbourg on the Rhine.
- February – Soldiers at Fort Louis de la Mobile celebrate Mardi Gras in Mobile, starting the tradition for Mobile, Alabama.
- March 1 – The Recruiting Act 1703 goes into effect in England, providing for the forcible enlistment of able-bodied but unemployed men into the English Army and Royal Navy in order to fight in Queen Anne's War in North America. The Act expires at the end of February 1704.
- March 15 – The landmark English court case of Rose v Royal College of Physicians is decided by the Court of Queen's Bench, beginning the end of the monopoly that the Royal College of Physicians has over the practice of medicine.
- March 19 – The Siege of Guadeloupe begins as an English expeditionary force, led by Christopher Codrington and Hovenden Walker, lands at Basse-Terre and attempts to take over the French-held island. The English fleet departs on May 15 after being unable to capture Guadeloupe.
- March 20 (February 4 in the Chinese calendar) – 46 of the forty-seven rōnin of Japan carry out an order of seppuku (ritual suicide) for the killing they committed on January 30. The punishment is given by the shogun Tokugawa Tsunayoshi. The story continues to be dramatized more than 300 years later in Chūshingura theater, novels and film.
- March 21 – Jeanne Guyon is freed from the Bastille in Paris after more than seven years imprisonment for heresy.

==== April–June ====
- April 21 – The Company of Quenching of Fire (i.e., a fire brigade) is founded in Edinburgh, Scotland.
- May 26 – Portugal joins the Grand Alliance.
- May 27 (May 16 OS) – The city of Saint Petersburg, Russia is founded, following Peter the Great's reconquest of Ingria from Sweden during the Great Northern War.
- June 15 – Rákóczi's War of Independence: Hungarians rebel under Prince Francis II Rákóczi.
- June 19 – Bavarian troops, who during the so-called Bavarian Rummel have invaded Tyrol, besiege Kufstein. Fires break out on the outskirts that engulf the town, destroy it and reach the powder store of the supposedly impregnable fortress. The enormous gunpowder supplies explode and Kufstein has to surrender on June 20. This same day the Tyrolese surrender in Wörgl; two days later Rattenberg is captured and Innsbruck is cleared without a fight on June 25.
- June 30 – Battle of Ekeren (War of the Spanish Succession): The French surround a smaller Dutch force, which however breaks out and retires to safety.
- June – The completed 1703 Icelandic census is presented in the Althing, the first complete census of any country.

==== July–September ====
- July 26 – After their victories at the Pontlatzer Bridge and the Brenner Pass, Tyrolese farmers drive out the Bavarian Elector, Maximilian II Emanuel, from North Tyrol and thus prevent the Bavarian Army, which is allied with France, from marching on Vienna during the War of the Spanish Succession. This success, at low cost, is the signal for the rebellion of the Tyrolese against Bavaria, and Elector Maximilian II Emanuel has to flee from Innsbruck. The Bavarian Army withdraws through Seefeld in Tirol back to Bavaria.
- July 29–31 – Daniel Defoe is placed in a pillory in London, then imprisoned until mid-November for the crime of seditious libel after publishing his satirical political pamphlet The Shortest Way with the Dissenters (1702).
- August 23 – Edirne event: Sultan Mustafa II of the Ottoman Empire is dethroned.
- September 7 – War of the Spanish Succession: The town of Breisach is retaken for France by Camille d'Hostun, duc de Tallard.
- September 12 – War of the Spanish Succession: Habsburg Archduke Charles is proclaimed King of Spain, but never exercises full rule.

==== October–December ====
- October 11 – Nine Roman Catholic residents of the French village of Sainte-Cécile-d'Andorge are massacred by a mob of more than 800 French Huguenot Protestants, the Camisards. A reprisal against Protestants in the nearby village of Branoux is made less than three weeks later.
- October 23 – Hannah Twynnoy, a 24-year-old barmaid in Malmesbury, Wiltshire, becomes the first person to be killed in Great Britain by a tiger. While working at the White Lion Inn, where a group of wild animals is on exhibit, she is mauled after bothering the tiger.
- October 30 – More than 47 Huguenots in the village of Branoux-les-Taillades are massacred by Roman Catholic vigilantes in reprisal for the October 11 attack on nearby Sainte-Cécile, slightly more than two miles away.
- November 15
  - War of the Spanish Succession: Battle of Speyerbach (in modern-day Germany) – The French defeat a German relief army, allowing the French to take the besieged town of Landau two days later, for which Tallard is made a Marshal of France.
  - Rákóczi's War of Independence: Battle of Zvolen (in modern-day Slovakia) – The Kurucs defeat the Austrians and their allies (Denmark, Hungary and the Serbs).
- November 19 – The so-called Man in the Iron Mask dies in the Bastille. He is buried under the name of "Marchioly".
- November 30 – Isaac Newton is elected president of the Royal Society of London, a position he will hold until his death in 1727.
- December 7–10 (November 26–29 O.S.) – The Great Storm of 1703, an extratropical cyclone, ravages southern England and the English Channel, killing at least 8,000, mostly at sea. The Eddystone Lighthouse off Plymouth is destroyed in the storm together with its designer Henry Winstanley and many buildings on land are damaged.
- December 27 – Portugal and England sign the Methuen Treaty, which gives preference to Portuguese wines imported into England.
- December 28 – Ahmed III succeeds the deposed Mustafa II as Ottoman Emperor.

==== Date unknown ====
- French-born imposter George Psalmanazar arrives in London.
- Between 1702 and 1703 – An epidemic of smallpox breaks out in Quebec, in which 2,000-3,000 people die (300-400 in Quebec City).

=== 1704 ===
==== January–March ====
- January 7 – A partial solar eclipse, Solar Saros 146, is visible in Antarctica.
- January 25–26 – Apalachee massacre: English colonists from the Province of Carolina, and their native allies, stage a series of brutal raids against a largely pacific population of Apalachee, in Spanish Florida.
- February 28 – Establishment of the first school open to African-Americans in New York City by Frenchman Elias Neau.
- February 29 – Raid on Deerfield (Queen Anne's War): French Canadians and Native Americans sack Deerfield, Massachusetts, killing over 50 English colonists.
- February – In America, Mardi Gras is celebrated with the Masque de la Mobile in the capital of Louisiana (New France), Mobile, Alabama.
- March 7 – War of the Spanish Succession: Prince Karl of Habsburg, brother of Joseph I, the Holy Roman Emperor and a pretender to the throne of Spain, arrives in Portugal on the English warship HMS Royal Katherine as part of George Rooke's English fleet sailing into Lisbon.
- March 23 – War of the Spanish Succession: The English Navy ships HMS Kent, HMS Bedford and HMS Antelope intercept two newly-built Spanish warships, Porta Coeli and Santa Teresa off of the coast of Cape Spartel, as the Spaniards attempt to sail into the Strait of Gibraltar. The two Spanish ships are captured after a seven-hour battle and taken toward Lisbon, but the Santa Teresa sinks along the way.

==== April–June ====
- April 21 – Battle of Biskupice: The Hungarians (Kurucs) win a costly victory over the Danes.
- April 24 – The first regular newspaper in the Thirteen Colonies of British North America, The Boston News-Letter, is published.
- May 19–23 – Vigorous Strombolian activity from Mount Vesuvius, Italy is recorded.
- May 28 – Battle of Smolenice: Kuruc rebels defeat the Austrian army and its allies.
- June 2 – Annular solar eclipse is visible from a region of the Southern Ocean between South Africa and Antarctica.
- June 13 – Battle of Koroncó: Austrians and their allies from Denmark, Prussia, Croatia, Germany and Vojvodina defeat the Kurucs.
- June 17 – Total lunar eclipse takes place, Saros series 125.

==== July–September ====
- July – Daniel Defoe documents the Great Storm of 1703 in England, with eyewitness testimonies, in The Storm.
- July 12 – Great Northern War – King Charles XII of Sweden forces the election of his ally Stanisław Leszczyński as King of Poland, in place of Augustus II the Strong.
- August 3 (July 23 Old Style) – War of the Spanish Succession – Gibraltar is captured from Spain, by English and Dutch forces under Sir George Rooke.
- August 7 – Battle of Orford Ness.
- August 13 (August 2 OS) – War of the Spanish Succession – Battle of Blenheim: Allied troops under John Churchill, Earl of Marlborough and Prince Eugene of Savoy defeat the Franco-Bavarian army.
- August 24 (August 13 OS) – War of the Spanish Succession – The French and Anglo-Dutch fleets clash off Málaga, causing heavy casualties on both sides, but without sinking any ships.
- September 8 – War of the Spanish Succession – The Twelfth Siege of Gibraltar by French and Spanish troops begins.
- September 12 – War of the Spanish Succession: The siege of the French-held German town of Landau, by Holy Roman Empire troops under the command of Ludwig Wilhelm von Baden-Baden begins and lasts for more than ten weeks before the French surrender on November 23. During the siege, the Holy Roman Emperor Joseph I visits the area in a newly-developed vehicle, a convertible horse-drawn carriage that has a removable roof. The style of vehicle itself is later called a "landau".
- September 28 – Damat Hasan Pasha, Grand Vizier of the Ottoman Empire, is removed from office by Ottoman Sultan Ahmed III, and replaced by Kalaylikoz Ahmed Pasha.

==== October–December ====
- October 24 – A peace treaty is signed between Prince Ferenc Rákóczi of Transylvania, and representatives of the Holy Roman Emperor, Leopold I at Schemnitz (now the Slovakian town of Banská Štiavnica)
- October 28 – Great Northern War: The Battle of Poniec takes place as King Charles XII leads Swedish troops in pursuit of the Saxon Army commanded by General Johann von der Schulenburg. The Swedes are forced to retreat despite surrounding the Saxons, and Schulenburg's troops escape.
- November 11 – Twelfth Siege of Gibraltar: A Spanish Bourbon special forces battalion, guided by Simon Susarte, scales the steepest side of the Rock of Gibraltar in an attempt to surprise the British defenders, and kills the English sentries who have been manning the lookout. The attack is foiled the next day when a drummer boy, who was bringing food to the sentries, spots the invaders and raises the alarm.
- November 26 – The inauguration of the newly built Kastelskirken takes place in Copenhagen, Denmark.
- November 27 – Annular solar eclipse is visible through Kazakhstan, Kyrgyzstan, eastern China, Myanmar and northern Philippines.
- December 6 – Battle of Chamkaur: During the Mughal-Sikh Wars, an outnumbered Sikh Khalsa defeats a Mughal army.
- December 25 – The fall of the meteorite of Barcelona is seen and heard over distances up to hundreds of kilometres and is interpreted as a divine sign.

==== Date unknown ====
- Great Northern War: Russian troops under Tsar Peter the Great capture Tartu and Narva.
- The Sultanate of Brunei cedes its north-east territories to the Sultanate of Sulu.
- The lower three counties of the Province of Pennsylvania become the colony of Delaware.
- An earthquake strikes Gondar, Ethiopia.
- Tenerife's earliest recorded volcanic eruption takes place from three fissure emission centres: Siete Fuentes, Fasnia and Arafo.
- A Tale of a Tub, the first major satire by Jonathan Swift (written 1694–1697), is published in London, running through three editions this year.
- Isaac Newton publishes his Opticks. He also predicts that the world will end in 2060.
- The Students' Monument is built in Aiud, Romania.
- Chinese Rites controversy: Rome decrees that Roman ceremonial practice in Latin (not in Chinese) is to be the law for Chinese missions.
- Nerchinsky Zavod is founded in the Nerchinsko-Zavodsky District of Zabaykalsky Krai, Russia by Greek mining engineers.
- Thomas Darley purchases the bay Arabian horse Darley Arabian in Aleppo, Syria, and ships him to stud in England, where he becomes the most important foundation sire of all modern thoroughbred racing bloodstock.
- Giancomo Miraldi observes Martian polar ice caps as "white spots" at the Martian poles.

=== 1705 ===
==== January–March ====
- January 8 – George Frideric Handel's first opera, Almira, is premiered in Hamburg.
- January 31 – The Hester, a British 28-gun sailing ship with a crew of 70, is lost in Persia.
- February 7 – Twelfth siege of Gibraltar: Marshal René de Froulay de Tessé of the French Army supplements the Spanish forces of the Marquis of Villadarias and seizes control of a strategic fortress, the Round Tower, but the forces retreat after a counterattack kills 200 of their number in the retaking of the Tower.
- February 25 – George Frideric Handel's opera Nero premieres in Hamburg.
- February 26 – Twelfth siege of Gibraltar: A French Navy fleet of 18 warships, commanded by Admiral Desjean, the Baron de Pointis arrives in the Bay of Gibraltar to aid the French and Spanish attempt to retake Gibraltar from England.
- March 8 – The Province of Carolina incorporates the town of Bath, making it the first incorporated town in modern-day North Carolina. The town becomes the political center and de facto capital of the northern portion of the Province of Carolina until Edenton is incorporated in 1722.
- March 14 – Queen Anne gives royal assent to the Parliament of England's Alien Act 1705, setting a deadline of December 25, 1705, for Scotland's parliament to authorize negotiations for a Treaty of Union with England to create the Kingdom of Great Britain and threatening that unless Scotland agrees to negotiate terms for union and accepts the Hanoverian succession by December 25, there would be a ban on the import of all Scottish staple products into England and Scots would also lose the privileges of Englishmen under English law – thus endangering rights to any property they held in England.
- March 31 (March 20 O.S.) – The Twelfth siege of Gibraltar ends as a fleet of warships from the navies of England, Portugal and the Netherlands, commanded by English Admiral John Leake, arrives at the Bay of Gibraltar with 35 warships and English and Portuguese troops. In the battle that follows, five of the French Navy's ships are sunk and Admiral Desjean is seriously wounded, forcing the French and Spanish to retreat.

==== April–June ====
- April 5 – Anne, Queen of England dissolves the English House of Commons that had been elected in 1702, and orders new elections.
- April 9 – The Queen's Theatre is opened in London by John Vanbrugh and William Congreve, serving as an opera house, premiering with Gli amori di ergasto ("The Loves of Ergasto"), an Italian language opera by German composer Jakob "Giacomo" Greber. A theatre remains in operation on this site for more than 300 years, becoming Her Majesty's Theatre.
- April 16 – Queen Anne of England honours Isaac Newton with the title of Knight Bachelor at Trinity College, Cambridge.
- May 5 – Joseph I succeeds his father Leopold I as Holy Roman Emperor.
- May 7 – 1705 English general election: Voting begins for 110 constituencies of the 513-member House of Commons of England (including Wales)
- June 6 – Voting ends in the English general election, with the Tories retaining their majority in the House of Commons but losing 38 seats, while the Whigs gain 49 seats. The balance in the 513 seats is 260 for the Tories, 233 for the Whigs, 20 for other candidates.
- June 20 – The Pact of Genoa is signed by representatives of England and the Spanish Principality of Catalonia as a military alliance providing for English troops to be stationed in Catalonia as part of the War of Spanish Succession.

==== July–September ====
- July 11 – José de Grimaldo, the Marquis of Grimaldo, becomes the head of government of Spain after being appointed by King Philip V as the Secretary of the Universal Bureau.
- July 14 – The newly-elected 2nd Parliament of Queen Anne in England, last to serve before the union with Scotland that produces Great Britain, is opened by the Queen.
- July 15 – Al-Husayn I ibn Ali becomes the first Bey of Tunis, founding the Husainid dynasty that rules Tunisia until the abolition of the monarchy in 1957.
- July 18 – War of the Spanish Succession: The Battle of Elixheim is fought near the city of Tienen (in modern-day Belgium). A troop of soldiers under the command of England's Duke of Marlborough kills 3,000 French troops under the command of the Duc de Valleroy and forces the retreat of the others, breaking the "Lines of Brabant". Because his soldiers have marched all night and then fought the battle over a full day, Marlborough is unable to send them in pursuit of Villeroy's troops.
- July 20 – The planet Mercury transits Jupiter, as seen by astronomers from Earth. The event happens again on October 4, 1708, but will not be seen again from Earth until October 27, 2088
- July 26 – Great Northern War: At the Battle of Gemauerthof, fought in modern-day Latvia, Swedish forces under the command of General Adam Ludwig Lewenhaupt overwhelm a much larger force of Russian troops commanded by Count Boris Sheremetev, killing 2,000 Russians and wounding as many as 3,000.
- July 31 – The Battle of Warsaw is fought near Warsaw, Poland, in the Great Northern War.
- August 16–18 – In an Atlantic tropical cyclone across Cuba and Florida, four ships are lost and there are many casualties.
- August 31–September 5 – War of the Spanish Succession: The Siege of Zoutleeuw is carried out by the alliance of Dutch, English, Scottish and Holy Roman Empire troops against the French-held fortress of Zoutleeuw (in modern-day Belgium).
- September 17 – First Javanese War of Succession: On the island of Java in the Dutch East Indies (modern-day Indonesia), Pakubuwono I becomes the new Sultan of Martaram, capturing Kartosuro and deposing Sultan Amangkurat III.
- September 20 – Francis II Rákóczi is proclaimed as the ruler of Hungary by independence activists in Szécsény who are opposed to the rule of the Habsburg successor to Leopold I, the Holy Roman emperor Joseph I.
- September 24 (O.S.) – Stanisław Leszczyński is crowned as King of Poland.

==== October–December ====
- c. October 3 – 31 people are killed in a colliery explosion at the Stony Flatt pit in Gateshead on Tyneside in England.
- October 4 (N.S.) – Stanisław Leszczyński is crowned Stanisław I of Poland.
- November – In Williamsburg, capital of the Colony of Virginia in America, construction of the Capitol Building is completed.
- November 5 – The Dublin Gazette in Ireland publishes its first edition.
- November 15 – Battle of Zsibó: The Austrian-Danish forces defeat the Kurucs (Hungarians).
- November 16 – An annular solar eclipse is visible in the southern Atlantic Ocean.
- November 23 – The premiere of the play Ulysses by Nicholas Rowe takes place in London, starring Thomas Betterton.
- November 24 – An earthquake is recorded in Syria, northeast of Damascus.
- November 28 – The Treaty of Warsaw is concluded between the Swedish Empire and the faction of the Polish–Lithuanian Commonwealth loyal to Stanisław Leszczyński during the Great Northern War.
- December 13 – In the Battle of Saint Gotthard, the Hungarian army is victorious.
- December 21 – The Sophia Naturalization Act is passed by the Parliament of England, which naturalizes Sophia of Hanover (next in succession to the British throne) and the Protestant "issue of her body" as British subjects.
- December 25 – In Munich, capital of Bavaria, 1,100 militiamen from the Oberland are killed during the Sendlinger Mordweihnacht after a failed attempt to break through several gates and capture a depot to seize better weaponry; many men are slaughtered by German federal infantry and Hungarian Hussars, despite their capitulation to Austrian officers.
- December 26 – Fateh Singh and Zorawar Singh, sons of Guru Gobind Singh, are murdered by Wazir Khan for refusing to convert to Islam, and become hallowed martyrs in Sikhism.
- December 29 – The premiere of the play Idoménée by Prosper Jolyot de Crébillon takes place in Paris.

==== Date unknown ====
- Construction begins on Blenheim Palace in Oxfordshire designed by John Vanbrugh for the Duke of Marlborough and partly funded by the Crown. It is completed in 1724.
- Taichung City, Taiwan is founded as the village of Dadun.
- Edmond Halley publicly predicts the periodicity of Halley's Comet and computes its expected path of return in 1758.
- With the interest paid from daimyō loans, the Konoike buy a tract of ponds and swampland, turn the land into rice paddies, and settle 480 households numbering perhaps 2,880 peasants on the land.
- The Shogunate confiscates the property of a merchant in Osaka "for conduct unbecoming a member of the commercial class". The government seizes 50 pairs of gold screens, 360 carpets, several mansions, 48 granaries and warehouses scattered around the country, and hundreds of thousands of gold pieces.

=== 1706 ===
==== January–March ====
- January 26
  - War of Spanish Succession: The uprising by Bavarians against the occupation of the Electorate of Bavaria by Austrian troops ends after 75 days, and ends the plans of Maximilian, the Elector of Bavaria, to bring Bavaria under the rule of the House of Wittelsbach.
  - Great Northern War – Battle of Grodno: A coalition of 34,000 Swedish and Polish troops besieges the then-Lithuanian city in the winter time, and clashes with 41,000 Russian and Saxon troops. After almost three months of fighting that lasts to April 10, Sweden takes control of the city, which is now located in Belarus.
- February 6 – The city of Albuquerque, New Mexico, is incorporated by governor Don Francisco Cuervo y Valdes as La Villa de Alburquerque in the Spanish colonial province of Santa Fe de Nuevo México in New Spain. Governor Cuervo sends a report on April 23 to the Spanish Crown and to New Spain's Governor, Francisco Fernández de la Cueva, 10th Duke of Alburquerque announcing that the new villa, consisting of 35 families and having a population of 252 adults, has been named in honor of the Duke.
- February 13 – Great Northern War – Battle of Fraustadt: Outnumbered more than 4 to 1 in infantry troops, and more than 2 to 1 overall, Swedish troops under the command of General Carl Gustaf Rehnskiöld defeat a larger force of 20,000 Russian and Saxon infantry and cavalry.
- March 21 – Mary Channing, who was pregnant at the time that she was convicted of the murder of her husband, is burned at the stake at Dorset, in front of a crowd of 10,000 onlookers.
- March 27 – Concluding that Emperor Iyasus I of Ethiopia has abdicated by retiring to a monastery, a council of high officials appoint Tekle Haymanot I Emperor of Ethiopia.
- March 31 – The last Courts (parliament) of the Principality of Catalonia are finished; their dissolution is presided over by King Charles III of Spain.

==== April–June ====
- April 10 – The Battle of Grodno ends with a Swedish victory over Russian troops.
- April 27 – War of the Spanish Succession: After a siege of 14 days, a French and Spanish army fails to take control of Barcelona, which had been captured by Habsburg armies in 1705.
- May 12 – A total eclipse of the Sun takes place and is visible in most of Europe, with a path crossing modern-day Spain, France, Germany, Poland and Russia
- May 23 – War of the Spanish Succession – Battle of Ramillies: English, Dutch, German, Swiss and Scottish troops led by John Churchill, 1st Duke of Marlborough, defeat Franco-Bavarian forces in the Low Countries.
- June 9 – Frederick IV of Denmark-Norway sends the first two Protestant missionaries to India, dispatching Lutherans Heinrich Plütcshau and Bartholomeus Ziegenbalg to Denmark-Norway's colony in India, the Dansk Ostindien, based at Tharangambadi ("Tranquebar") in what is now the Tamil Nadu state.
- June 11 – In Tibet, Lha-bzang Khan, khan of the Khoshut, kills the regent and kidnaps the 6th Dalai Lama, Tsangyang Gyatso, and kills the Lama's regent.
- June 28 – War of the Spanish Succession: Troops dispatched from Portugal capture Madrid and proclaim the Habsburg dynasty's Archduke Charles of Austria to be the King Carlos III of Spain, after the Bourbon ruler, Philip V, has fled.
- June 29 – Flemish Jesuit missionary François Noël is welcomed in China by the Kangxi Emperor at the Forbidden City in Beijing, and discusses the Emperor's disdain over the disapproval of Jesuit accommodation of Confucian rites by the Roman Catholic Church.

==== July–September ====
- July 22 – The Treaty of Union between Scotland and England is agreed upon in London, for ratification by the national legislatures.
- August 4 – War of the Spanish Succession: The Spanish Bourbon armies of King Philip V retake Madrid from the Portuguese and Habsburg Austria troops that had entered the city in June.
- August 18 – King Louis XIV of France makes his last visit to Paris, and gets an update on the construction of the veterans' hospital at the Dome des Invalides, which he had commissioned more than 35 years earlier.
- September 7 – War of the Spanish Succession – Battle of Turin: Forces of Austria and Savoy defeat the French near what is now the Italian city of Torino.

==== October–December ====
- October 13
  - Augustus II, known as August der Starke (Augustus the Strong), Elector of Saxony, having ruled as King of Poland since 1706, signs the Treaty of Altranstädt (1706), renouncing all claims to the throne to settle his fight with Sweden during the Great Northern War.
  - Iyasu I, Emperor of Ethiopia since 1682, is assassinated on the island of Tana, on orders of his son, Tekle Haymanot I, who has ruled in Iyasu's place. After being crowned as the new Emperor, Tekle Haymanot is stabbed to death in 1708 on orders of Iyasu's brother, Tewoflos.
- October – Twinings founder, Thomas Twining, opens the first known tea room at 216 Strand, London, still open as of 2024.
- November 4 – The Parliament of Scotland votes, 116 to 83, to approve the merger of Scotland with England to form the Kingdom of Great Britain.
- November 6 – A British attempt to conquer the Canary Islands fails when a fleet of 12 Royal Navy warships, commanded by Admiral John Jennings is forced to retreat after being met by a heavy artillery attack while sailing into Santa Cruz Bay
- November 15 – Five months after having been deposed from his position as the Dalai Lama, Tsangyang Gyatso disappears while in exile in Qinghai and is presumed to have been murdered.
- November 28 – The royal wedding of Prussia takes place in Berlin between the 18-year-old Crown Prince Friedrich Wilhelm and his bride Sophia Dorothea of Hanover, the 19-year-old daughter of the future King George I of Great Britain.
- December 9 – João V becomes the new King of Portugal upon the death of his father, Dom Pedro II, and begins a reign of 43 years.
- December 14 – Spanish General Alexandre Maître, Marquis de Bay leads the successful capture of Alcántara from Portugal
- December 31 – François Martin, the first Governor General of French India (now part of India's union territory of Puducherry), retires after seven years and is replaced by Pierre Dulivier.

=== 1707 ===
==== January–March ====
- January 1 – John V is crowned King of Portugal and the Algarves in Lisbon.
- January 16 – The Treaty (or Act) of Union, of the two Kingdoms of Scotland and England, is ratified by the Parliament of Scotland by a vote of 110 to 68.
- February 4 – Great Northern War: Eighteen months after losing the Battle of Warsaw, while leading a cavalry charge for Saxony against the army of Sweden, General Otto von Paykull of Swedish Livonia is beheaded outside of Stockholm, following his conviction for treason.
- February 15 – As part of the process of the unification of Scotland and England as Great Britain, Scotland selects 16 members to sit in the House of Lords at the Palace of Westminster.
- March 3 – Emperor Aurangzeb dies in Ahmednagar, Aurangabad.
- March 19 – The Act of Union with Scotland is ratified by the Parliament of England; the Parliament of Scotland is adjourned for the last time on May 1, 1707.

==== April–June ====
- April 25 (April 14 Old Style) – War of the Spanish Succession – Battle of Almansa: The Bourbon army of Spain and France (with Irish mercenaries) under the French-born Englishman James FitzJames, 1st Duke of Berwick, soundly defeats the allied forces of Portugal, England, and the Dutch Republic led by the French-born Huguenot (in English service) Henri de Massue, Earl of Galway. Following this, Philip V of Spain promulgates the first Nueva Planta decrees, bringing the Kingdoms of Valencia and Aragon under the laws of the Crown of Castile.
- May 1 – The Kingdom of England and the Kingdom of Scotland are united as the Kingdom of Great Britain.
- May 8 – The siege of Játiva within the Spanish kingdom of Valencia begins as 9,000 Castilian and French troops, at the direction of King Philip V attack Játiva, defended by troops of the Kingdom of Aragon. Játiva (now Xàtiva) falls on June 6.
- May 12 (May 1 Old Style) – The new sovereign state of Great Britain comes into being, as a result of the Acts of Union, which combine the Kingdoms of Scotland and England into a single united Kingdom of Great Britain, and merge the Parliaments of England and Scotland, to form the Parliament of Great Britain.
- May 23 – The volcanic eruption in the Santorini caldera begins.
- June 4 – On the island now occupied by Sri Lanka, Narendra Sinha becomes the monarch of most of the area as the new Kandyan king, succeeding to the throne upon the death of his father, King Vimaladharmasuriya II. Narendra Sinha reigns for almost 32 years until his death on May 13, 1739.
- June 6 – The soldiers and officers defending the Aragonese city of Játiva are massacred after a larger force of Castilian troops breaks through the walls at the end of a 30-day siege. The rest of the town's residents are deported, and most of the dwellings are burned, with the area being renamed "San Felipe".
- June 8 – Less than three months after proclaiming himself to be the new Emperor of India, Muhammad Azam Shah and his three sons are killed in a battle by his troops led by his half-brother Muhammad Mu'azzam
- June 13 – On Francis II Rákóczi's recommendation, and with Count Miklos Bercsényi's support, a meeting of the Hungarian independence activists, held at the village of Ónod declares the deposing of the House of Habsburg (and Joseph I, King of Hungary from the Hungarian throne.
- June 19 – The coronation of Muhammad Mu'azzam as the new Emperor of India, Bahadur Shah I, takes place in Delhi
- June 28 – Yeshe Gyatso is installed as the new Dalai Lama by his father, Lha-bzang Khan, who has recently deposed the 6th Dalai Lama. Though the justification is that the 21-year-old Yeshe was the true reincarnation of the 5th Dalai Lama, Yeshe receives no recognition from Buddhists in Tibet or Mongolia and the 7th Dalai Lama is installed in 1710.

==== July– September ====
- July 29–August 21 – War of the Spanish Succession – Battle of Toulon: The Allies are obliged to withdraw, but the French fleet is effectively put out of action.
- August 27 – Charles XII of Sweden launches his campaign to conquer Russia, marching to the east from Altranstädt with 60,000 coalition troops. Another 16,000 soldiers are waiting on the outskirts of Riga, guarding the Swedish supply lines.
- September 14 – Vincenzo Durazzo is elected to a 2-year term as the new Doge of the Republic of Genoa (including the island of Corsica), succeeding the outgoing Doge, Domenico Maria De Mari.
- September 18–October 4 – War of the Spanish Succession: The siege of the fortress of Ciudad Rodrigo, led by troops under the command of Alexandre Maître, begins and lasts for 16 days. On the final day, General Maitre begins the attack that takes the fortress within 45 minutes.
- September 30 – War of the Spanish Succession: the conquest by Austrian troops, of the Italian peninsula city state of Gaeta, is accomplished after a three-month siege led by General Wirich Philipp von Daun.

==== October– December ====
- October 22 – Scilly naval disaster: Four British Royal Navy ships run aground in the Isles of Scilly, because of faulty navigation. Admiral Sir Cloudesley Shovell and at least 1,450 sailors all drown.
- October 23 – The Parliament of the Kingdom of Great Britain first meets in London.
- October 28 – The Hōei earthquake (the most powerful in Japan until 2011) strikes, with an estimated local magnitude of 8.6 and kills at least 5,000 people.
- November 30 – War of the Spanish Succession: The Siege of Pensacola ends, with the Spanish successfully defending their fort.
- December 16 – The last recorded eruption of Mount Fuji begins in Japan.
- December 24 – The first British Governor of Gibraltar, directly appointed by Queen Anne, Roger Elliott, takes up his residence in the Convent of the Franciscan Friars.
- December 28 – Charles XII of Sweden and his coalition of troops begin crossing the first line of defense of the Russian Empire, the Vistula River, in their attempt to conquer Russia.

==== Date unknown ====
- A fortress is founded on the future site of Ust-Abakanskoye (modern Abakan).
- The Lao empire of Lan Xang officially ends, and splits into the kingdoms of Vientiane, Luang Prabang, and Champasak.
- Hacienda Juriquilla is built in Querétaro, Mexico.
- The English Parliament establishes the first turnpike trusts, which place a length of road under the control of trustees, drawn from local landowners and traders. The trusts borrow capital for road maintenance against the security of tolls, and this arrangement becomes the common method of road maintenance for the next 150 years.
- Battle of Yuraktau, the event that leads to the strengthening of the Bashkir rebellion of 1704–1711.

=== 1708 ===
==== January–June ====
- January 1 – Charles XII of Sweden invades Russia, by crossing the frozen Vistula River with 40,000 men.
- January 7 – Bashkir rebels besiege Yelabuga.
- January 12 – Shahu I becomes the fifth Chhatrapati of the Maratha Empire in the Indian subcontinent.
- February 26 – HMS Falmouth, a 50-gun fourth-rate ship of the line built at Woolwich Dockyard for the British Royal Navy, is launched.
- March 11 – Anne, Queen of Great Britain, withholds Royal Assent from the Scottish Militia Bill, the last time a British monarch vetoes legislation.
- March 23 – James Francis Edward Stuart, Jacobite pretender to the throne of Great Britain, unsuccessfully tries to land from a French fleet in the Firth of Forth in Scotland.
- April 8 – Easter Sunday: The first performance of George Frideric Handel's oratorio La resurrezione takes place in Rome.
- April 9 – Ottoman princess Emine Sultan, daughter of Sultan Mustafa II, marries Grand Vizier Çorlulu Ali Pasha.
- April 28 – The Great Hoei fire breaks out in Kyoto, Japan, destroying the Imperial Palace and a large portion of the old capital.
- June 8 – War of the Spanish Succession: Wager's Action, a naval confrontation, takes place between a British squadron under Charles Wager and the Spanish treasure fleet off Cartagena in the Caribbean Sea. Spanish galleon San José explodes and sinks with the loss of almost all her 600 crew and an estimated 8.8 million ounces troy weight in gold; her wreck is located in 2015.

==== July–December ====
- July 1 – Tewoflos becomes Emperor of Ethiopia.
- July 11 – War of the Spanish Succession: Battle of Oudenarde – Allied forces under the command of John Churchill, 1st Duke of Marlborough, defeat the French in the Spanish Netherlands.
- August – The future Charles VI, Holy Roman Emperor weds Elisabeth Christine of Brunswick-Wolfenbüttel.
- August 3 – In the Battle of Trenčín, 8,000 soldiers of the Imperial Army of the Habsburgs are victorious over the 15,000 Hungarian Kuruc forces of Francis II Rákóczi.
- August 18 – War of the Spanish Succession: Menorca is captured by British forces.
- August 23 – Meidingu Pamheiba is crowned King of Manipur.
- August 29 – A French-Native American attack in Haverhill, Massachusetts kills 16 settlers.
- September 28 (O.S.); September 29 (Swedish calendar); October 9 (N.S.) – Great Northern War: Battle of Lesnaya – Peter the Great of Russia defeats the forces of the Swedish Empire.
- October 12 – War of the Spanish Succession: British forces capture Lille after a two-month siege, although the citadel continues to hold out for another six weeks.
- October 26 – Topping out of new St Paul's Cathedral in London.
- December 14 – The première of Electre by Prosper Jolyot de Crébillon takes place in Paris.
- December 17 – Deborah Churchill, British pickpocket and prostitute, is executed before a large crowd for being an accomplice to murder.

==== Date unknown ====
- Fearful of a Swedish attack, the Russians blow up the city of Tartu, Estonia.
- The Russians burn the city of Porvoo, Finland (at the time part of Sweden).
- One third of the population of Masuria dies of the plague.
- Johann Sebastian Bach is appointed as chamber musician and organist, at the court in Weimar.
- Italian philosopher Giambattista Vico delivers his inaugural lecture to the University of Naples, which will be published in 1709 as his first book, De Nostri Temporis Studiorum Ratione (On the Order of the Scholarly Disciplines of Our Times).
- Calcareous hard-paste porcelain is produced for the first time in Europe, at Dresden, Saxony, by Ehrenfried Walther von Tschirnhaus, and developed after his death (October) by Johann Friedrich Böttger.
- The Company of Merchants of London Trading (with consent of the Parliament of Great Britain) merges with the East Indies, and the more recently established English Company Trading to the East Indies, to form the United Company of Merchants of England Trading to the East Indies, known as the Honourable East India Company.

=== 1709 ===
==== January–March ====
- January 1 – Battle of St. John's: The French capture St. John's, the capital of the British colony of Newfoundland.
- January 6 – Western Europe's Great Frost of 1709, the coldest period in 500 years, begins during the night, lasting three months, with its effects felt for the entire year. In France, the Atlantic coast and Seine River freeze, crops fail, and 24,000 Parisians die. Floating ice enters the North Sea.
- January 10 – Abraham Darby I successfully produces cast iron using coke fuel at his Coalbrookdale blast furnace in Shropshire, England.
- February 1 or 2 – During his first voyage, Captain Woodes Rogers encounters marooned privateer Alexander Selkirk, and rescues him after four years living on one of the Juan Fernández Islands, inspiring Daniel Defoe's novel Robinson Crusoe. After sacking Guayaquil, he and Selkirk will visit the Galápagos Islands.
- February 19 – Tokugawa Ienobu becomes the sixth shōgun of the Tokugawa dynasty of Japan, after the death of the shōgun Tsunayoshi, who had been head of government since 1680.
- February – In America, Mardi Gras is celebrated one more time with Masque de la Mobile in the capital of French Louisiana, Mobile, Alabama, before Mobile is moved 27 miles (43 km) down the Mobile River to Mobile Bay in 1711.
- March 28 – Johann Friedrich Böttger reports the first production of hard-paste porcelain in Europe, at Dresden.

==== April–June ====
- April 13 – The Raudot Ordinance of 1709 becomes law in the French colony of New France, legalizing slavery.
- April 21 – Mirwais Hotak takes control of Kandahar (in Afghanistan) by murdering the Persian governor, Gurgin Khan, known also as George XI.
- May 6 – The first influx into Britain of poor refugee families of German Palatines from the Rhenish Palatinate arrives in England. Most of them are Protestants en route to the New World colonies.
- June 17 – Trịnh Cương becomes the new king of northern Vietnam (Đàng Ngoài) upon the death of his grandfather, Trịnh Căn, and begins a 20-year reign until his death on December 20, 1729
- June 26 – The Battle of Fort Albany, an attack by 100 French colonial volunteers and Cree natives on the British Hudson's Bay Company outpost at Fort Albany on Hudson Bay. John Fullartine, commander of the post, leads a successful defense of the fort and 18 of the attackers are killed and then retreat. The site is now part of a Cree First Nation reserve in the Canadian province of Ontario.
- June 28 – A treaty is signed in Dresden to re-establish an alliance between the Kingdoms of Denmark-Norway and the Electorate of Saxony, on behalf of King Frederik IV of Denmark-Norway and Saxony's King Augustus II.

==== July–December ====
- July 8 (June 27 Old Style; June 28 in the Swedish calendar) – Great Northern War: Battle of Poltava in the Cossack Hetmanate (Ukraine) – Peter the Great leads forces of the Tsardom of Russia to a decisive victory over Swedish forces under Charles XII, ending the Swedish invasion of Russia and effectively ending Sweden's role as a major power in Europe.
- July 9 – Christopher Slaughterford of London is executed in Guildford for the murder of Jane Young, his fiancée. He is the first person in modern England executed for murder based exclusively on circumstantial evidence, and he maintains his innocence to the last.
- July 13 – Production of Eau de Cologne is begun by perfumier Johann Maria Farina in Germany, founding Johann Maria Farina gegenüber dem Jülichs-Platz.
- July 26 – Reinhard Keiser's opera Desiderius, König der Langobarden is premiered in Hamburg.
- July 27 – Japan's Emperor Higashiyama abdicates after a reign of 23 years that began in 1687, and is succeeded by his son Yoshihito, who is enthroned as the Emperor Nakamikado.
- July 30 – War of the Spanish Succession: Tournai is captured by John Churchill, 1st Duke of Marlborough and Prince Eugene of Savoy.
- August 8 – The hot air balloon of Bartolomeu de Gusmão flies in Portugal.
- August 28 – Pamheiba is crowned King of Manipur.
- September 11 (August 31 Old Style) – War of the Spanish Succession: Battle of Malplaquet – Troops of the Dutch Republic, Habsburg monarchy, the Kingdom of Great Britain and the Kingdom of Prussia, led by the Duke of Marlborough, drive the French from the field, but suffer twice as many casualties.
- October 9 – War of the Spanish Succession: The British army captures Mons.
- October 12 – Chihuahua City in Mexico is founded.
- October 14 – The Chinese region of Ningxia is shaken by a 7.5 earthquake killing more than 2,000 people.
- December 25 – From London, ten ships leave for the New York Colony carrying over 4,000 people.
- December 26 – The first performance of the opera Agrippina by George Frideric Handel takes place at the Teatro San Giovanni Grisostomo in Venice.

==== Date unknown ====
- Herculaneum, an ancient town in Ercolano, Campania, Italy and buried under volcanic ash and pumice in the eruption of Mount Vesuvius in 79 AD, is discovered by accident when attempts to drill a well for a monastery encountered marble and other materials.
- The first modern edition of William Shakespeare's plays is published in London, edited by Nicholas Rowe.
- The first piano is exhibited in Florence by its inventor Bartolomeo Cristofori, who names it "gravicembalo col piano e forte", a name which is subsequently shortened to "pianoforte" and then "piano".
- A collapsible umbrella is introduced in Paris.
- Trinity School is founded as the charity school of Trinity Church, in New York City.
- The second Eddystone Lighthouse, erected off the south west coast of England by John Rudyerd, is completed.
- De Nostri Temporis Studiorum Ratione (On the Study Methods of Our Times) is published by Neapolitan philosopher Giambattista Vico.
- Priceless medieval altarpieces, created by Tyrolese sculptor Michael Pacher, are destroyed.
- Basil Lazarus III becomes Syriac Orthodox Maphrian of the East.

== Births ==
1700

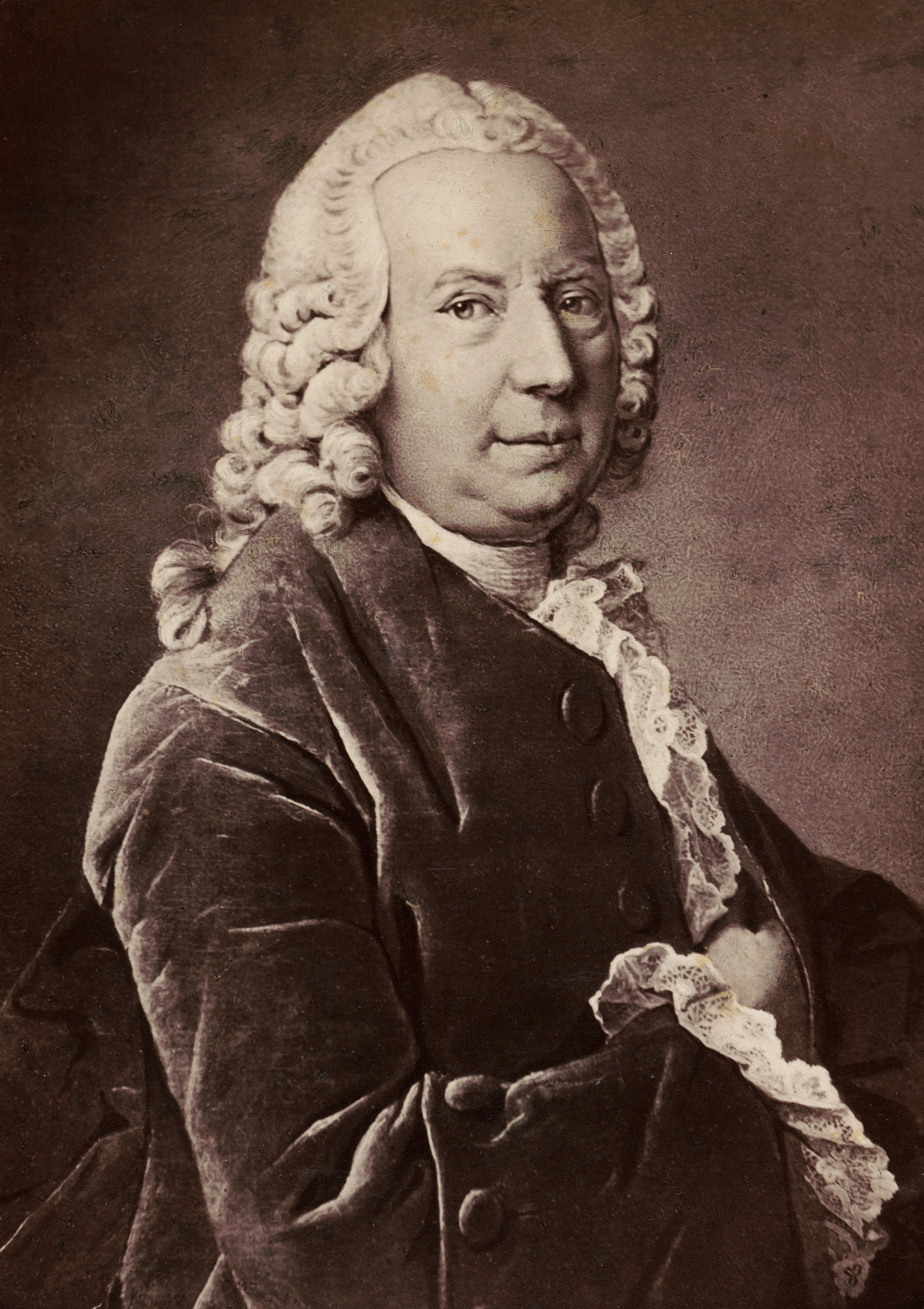
Daniel Bernoulli born 8 February

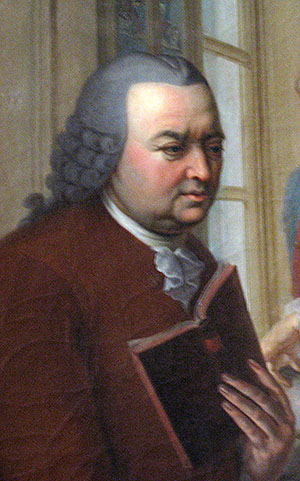
Gerard van Swieten born 7 May

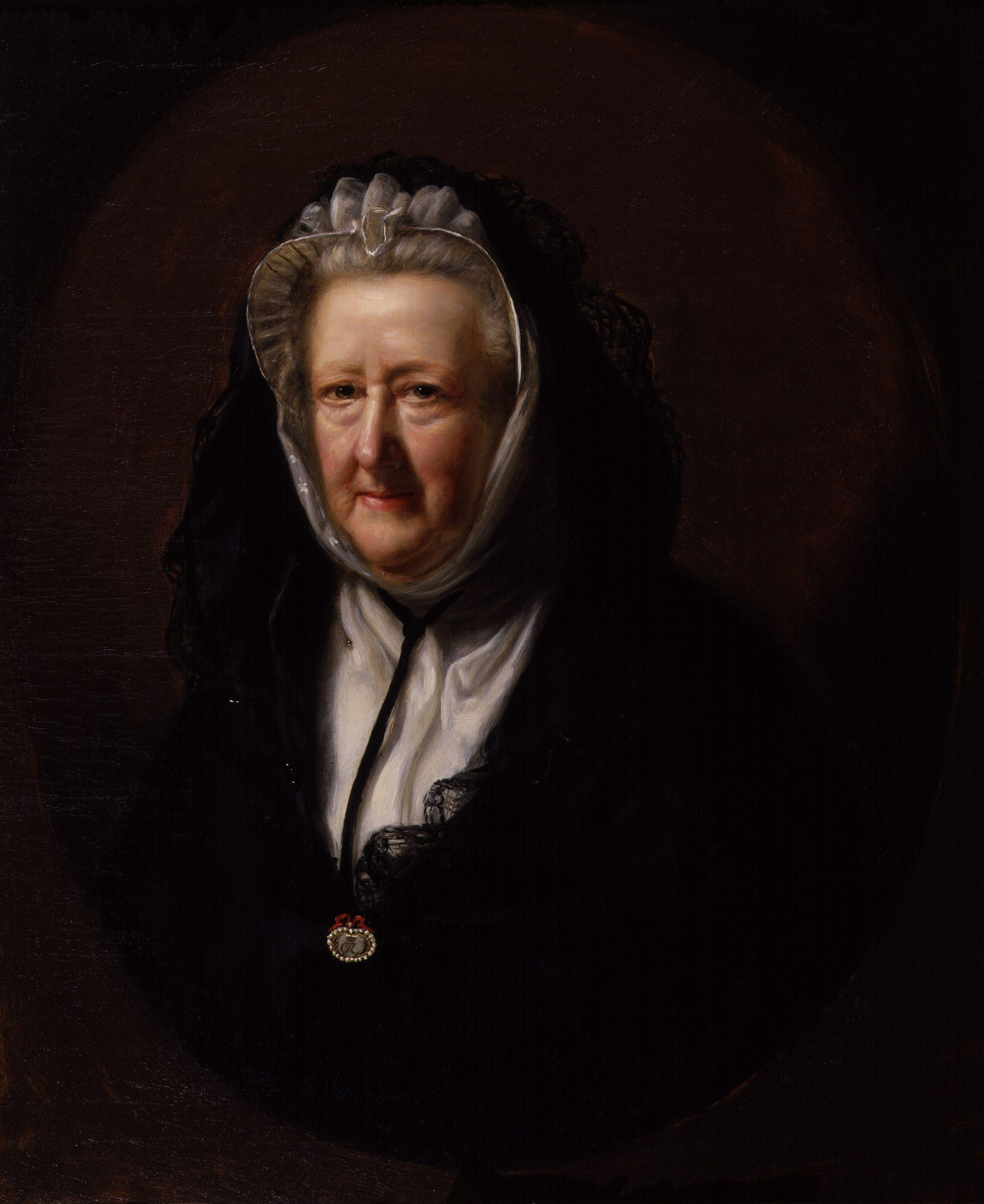
Mary Delany born 14 May

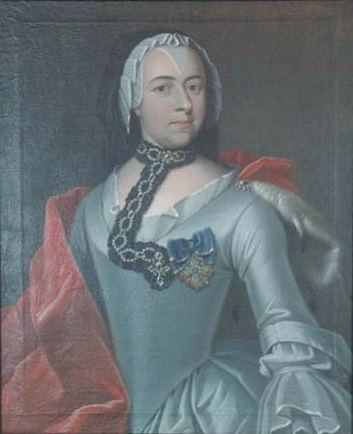
Countess Caroline of Erbach-Fürstenau born 29 September

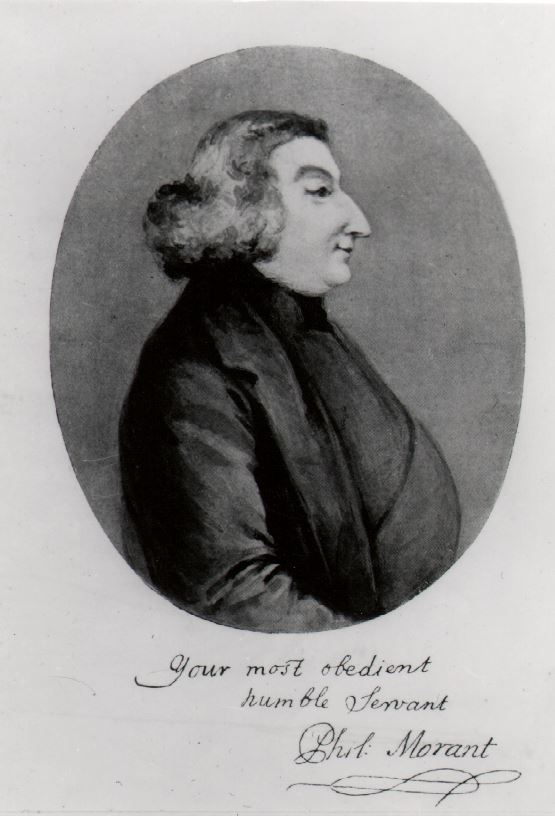
Philip Morant born 6 October

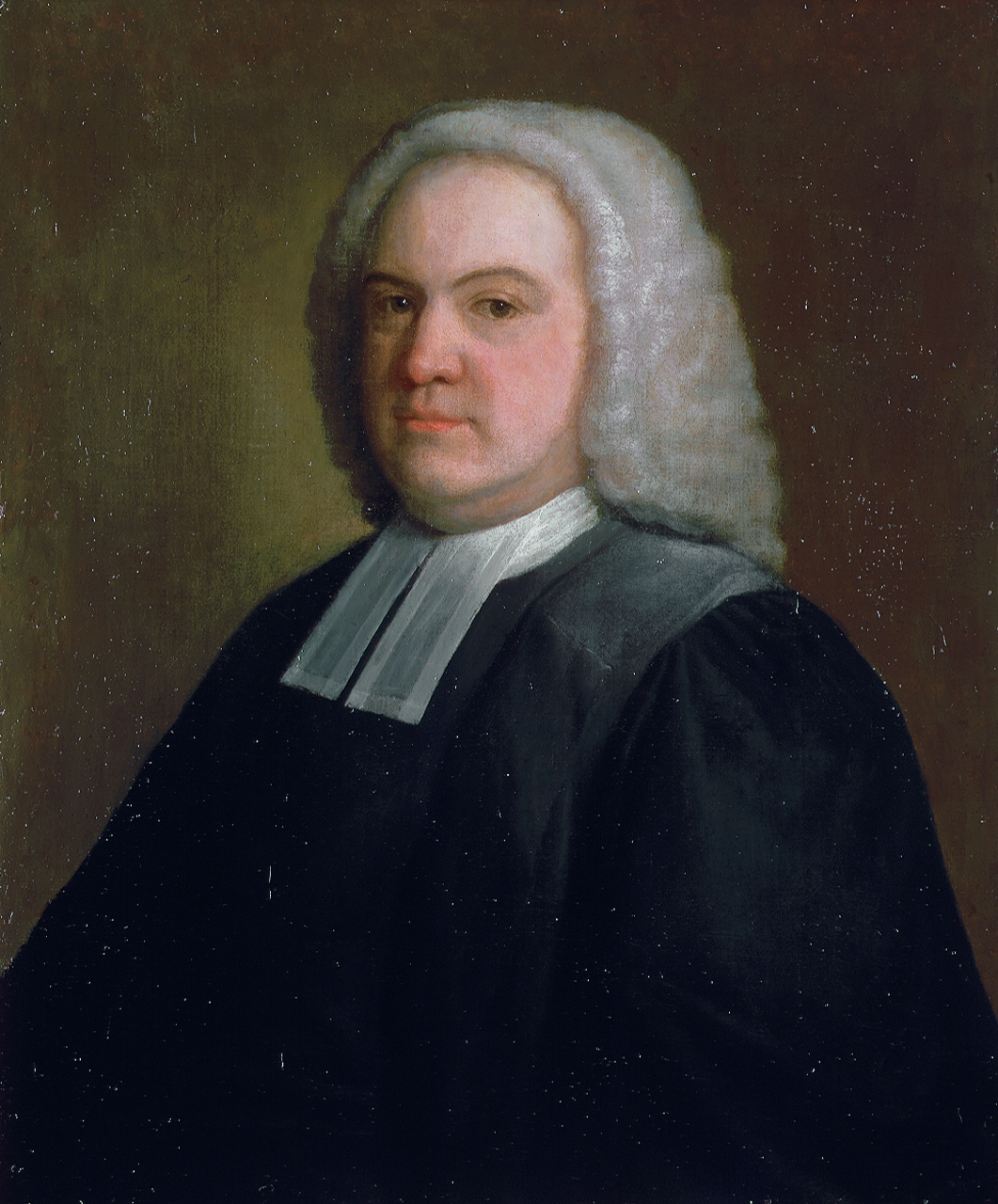
Nathaniel Bliss born 28 November

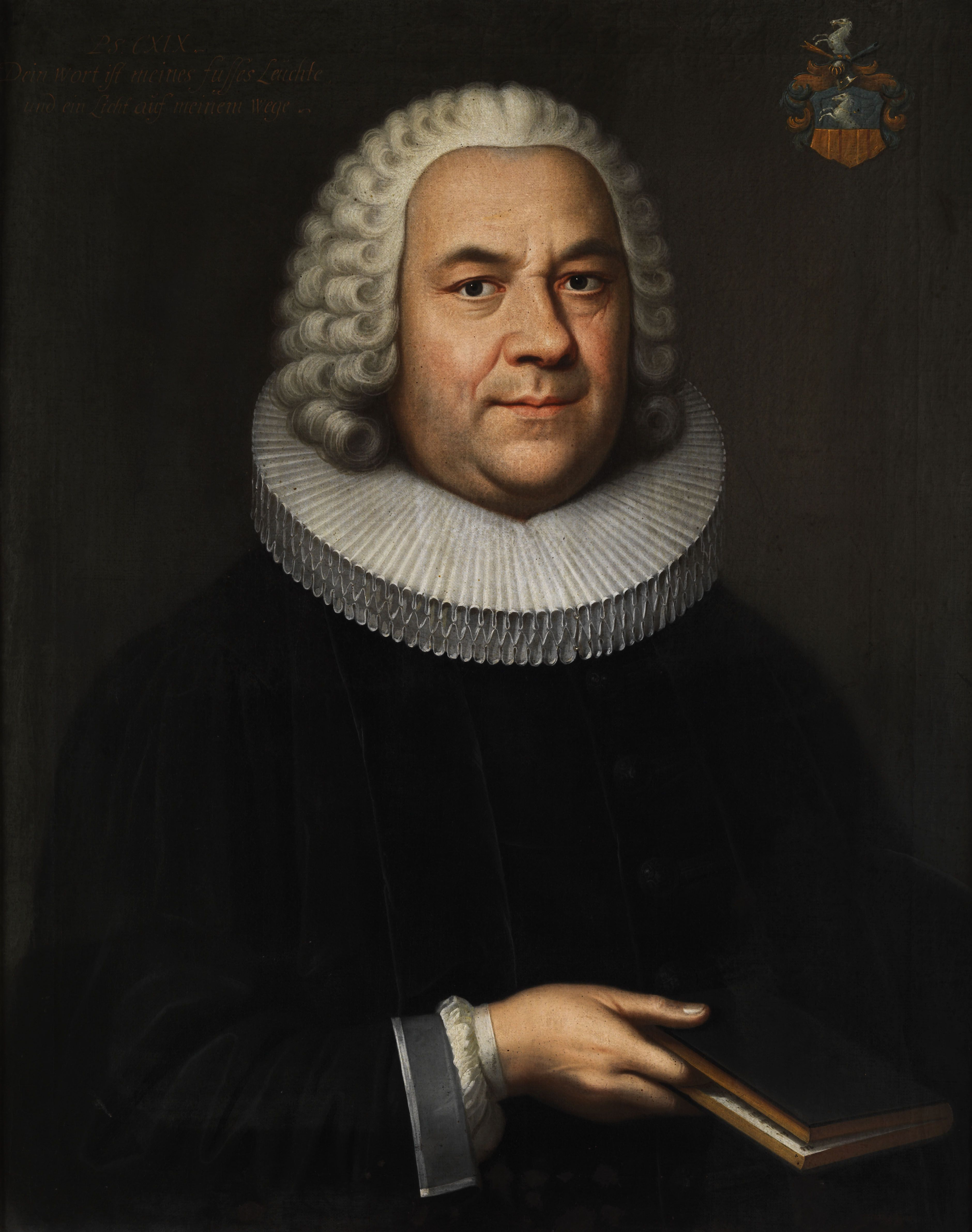
Jeremias Friedrich Reuß born 8 December

- January 8 – Augustyn Mirys, Polish painter (d. 1790)
- January 14 – Picander (Christian Friedrich Henrici), German poet and librettist (d. 1764)
- January 23 – John Christian, Count Palatine of Sulzbach from 1732 to 1733 (d. 1733)
- January 28 – John Penn ("the American"), American-born merchant (d. 1746)
- January 29 – Konstancja Czartoryska, Polish noblewoman and politician (d. 1759)
- February 2 – Johann Christoph Gottsched, German philosopher (d. 1766)
- February 8 – Daniel Bernoulli, Dutch-born Swiss mathematician (d. 1782)
- February 16 – Pedro Messía de la Cerda, 2nd Marquis of Vega de Armijo, Spanish naval officer and colonial official (d. 1783)
- February 18 – Nicolaus Schuback, German lawyer (d. 1783)
- February 21 – Henri Hemsch, French harpsichord maker of German origin (d. 1769)
- February 28 – Samsam ud Daula Shah Nawaz Khan, Mughal courtier (d. 1758)
- March 1 – Pierre-Joseph Bourcet, French tactician (d. 1780)
- March 3
  - William Lacon Childe, English politician (d. 1757)
  - Charles-Joseph Natoire, French painter in the Rococo manner (d. 1777)
- March 4 – Louis Auguste, Prince of Dombes, grandson of Louis XIV of France and of his maîtresse-en-titre Françoise-Athénaïs (d. 1755)
- March 8 – William Morgan (of Tredegar, elder), Welsh politician (d. 1731)
- March 13
  - Michel Blavet, French composer and flute virtuoso (d. 1768)
  - Antonio Joli, Italian painter of vedute and capricci (d. 1777)
  - James Kent, English organist and composer (d. 1776)
  - Jób Viczay, Hungarian nobleman (d. 1734)
- March 15 – Leonor Tomásia de Távora, 3rd Marquise of Távora, Portuguese noblewoman (d. 1759)
- March 23 – Pieter Woortman, Dutch colonial administrator (d. 1780)
- March 29 – Charles Cornwallis, 1st Earl Cornwallis (d. 1762)
- March 30 – Thomas Pichon, French colonial agent (d. 1781)
- April 4 – Christophe Moyreau, French Baroque composer (d. 1774)
- April 30
  - Charles Frederick, Duke of Holstein-Gottorp, Swedish nobleman (d. 1739)
  - Percy Freke, British baronet and Irish politician (d. 1728)
- May 2 – Countess Charlotte of Hanau-Lichtenberg (d. 1726)
- May 6 – Giuseppe Peroni, Italian painter (d. 1776)
- May 7 – Gerard van Swieten, Dutch-born physician (d. 1772)
- May 12 – Luigi Vanvitelli, Italian architect (d. 1773)
- May 14 – Mary Delany, English artist (d. 1788)
- May 19 – José de Escandón, Spanish colonial governor (d. 1770)
- May 22 – Michel-François Dandré-Bardon, French history painter and etcher (d. 1785)
- May 26 – Nicolaus Ludwig Zinzendorf, German religious and social reformer (d. 1760)
- May 27 – Robert Shirley, British Tory politician (d. 1738)
- May 30 – Prosper Anton Josef von Sinzendorf, Austrian nobleman and courtier (d. 1756)
- May 31 – Stephen Bayard, 39th Mayor of New York City from 1744 to 1747 (d. 1757)
- June 3 – Karen Huitfeldt, Danish courtier (d. 1778)
- June 8 – Georg Wilhelm von Driesen, lieutenant general in Frederick the Great's Prussian army and a county commission of Osterrode (Ostróda) (d. 1758)
- June 10 – Ewald Georg von Kleist, German jurist (d. 1748)
- June 16 – Margaret Coke, Countess of Leicester, British peer (d. 1775)
- June 19 – Charles, Count of Charolais, French noble (d. 1760)
- June 20 – Peter Faneuil, wealthy American colonial merchant (d. 1743)
- June 25 – William Boys, Royal Navy officer who became Commander-in-Chief (d. 1774)
- June 26
  - Richard Dana, prominent lawyer and politician in colonial Massachusetts (d. 1772)
  - Joaquín de Montserrat, 1st Marquess of Cruillas (d. 1771)
- July 11 – Charles Townshend, 3rd Viscount Townshend (d. 1764)
- July 12 – Claude-Antoine de Bermen de La Martinière, Quebec-born son of Claude de Bermen de la Martinière (d. 1761)
- July 20 – Henri-Louis Duhamel du Monceau, French physician (d. 1782)
- July 29 – Peter Joseph Kofler, mayor of Vienna (d. 1764)
- August 13 – Heinrich, count von Brühl, German statesman (d. 1763)
- August 17 – Clemens August of Bavaria, Archbishop-Elector of Cologne (d. 1761)
- August 18
  - Baji Rao I, general of the Maratha Empire in India (d. 1740)
  - Lars Pinnerud, Norwegian farmer and woodcarver (d. 1762)
- August 23 – Hans Caspar von Krockow, Prussian major general and commander of the Cuirassier Regiment No (d. 1759)
- August 27
  - Charles Colyear, 2nd Earl of Portmore (d. 1785)
  - Carl Hårleman, Swedish architect (d. 1753)
- August 30 – Christian August von Eyben, German lawyer and dean of the Bishopric of Lübeck (d. 1785)
- September 6 – Claude-Nicolas Le Cat, French surgeon (d. 1768)
- September 9 – Princess Anna Sophie of Schwarzburg-Rudolstadt, Princess of Schwarzburg-Rudolstadt (d. 1780)
- September 11 – James Thomson, Scottish poet (d. 1748)
- September 15 – Jean-Gilles du Coëtlosquet, French ecclesiastic (d. 1784)
- September 20
  - Benedict Leonard Calvert, 15th Proprietary Governor of Maryland from 1727 through 1731 (d. 1732)
  - Victor Frederick, Prince of Anhalt-Bernburg, German prince of the House of Ascania (d. 1765)
- September 25 – Gaetano Zompini, Italian printmaker and engraver (d. 1778)
- September 29 – Countess Caroline of Erbach-Fürstenau and by marriage Duchess of Saxe-Hildburghausen (d. 1758)
- September 30 – Stanisław Konarski, Polish writer (d. 1773)
- October 6 – Philip Morant (d. 1770)
- October 7 – Henry Moore, 4th Earl of Drogheda (d. 1727)
- October 9 – George Hazard (d. 1738)
- October 10 – Lambert-Sigisbert Adam, French sculptor born in Nancy (d. 1759)
- October 13 – Phanuel Bacon, English playwright (d. 1783)
- October 20 – Charlotte Aglaé d'Orléans (d. 1761)
- October 23 – Samuel Dexter, minister from Dedham (d. 1755)
- October 24 – Marten Schagen, Dutch Mennonite bookseller (d. 1770)
- October 26 – Peter Jacob Horemans, Flemish painter of genre scenes (d. 1776)
- October 30 – Sir Cecil Bishopp, 6th Baronet (d. 1778)
- November 7 – Erdmuthe Dorothea of Reuss-Ebersdorf (d. 1756)
- November 17 – Frederick William, Margrave of Brandenburg-Schwedt, German nobleman (d. 1771)
- November 19 – Jean-Antoine Nollet, French abbot and physicist (d. 1770)
- November 21 – Charlotta Elisabeth van der Lith, politically active Governor's wife in Surinam (d. 1753)
- November 24 – Johann Bernhard Bach the Younger (d. 1743)
- November 28
  - Nathaniel Bliss, English astronomer (d. 1764)
  - Sophie Magdalene of Brandenburg-Kulmbach (d. 1770)
  - Philip Kinsky of Wchinitz and Tettau (d. 1749)
- December 4 – Agnes Wilhelmine von Wuthenau, German noblewoman and the first wife of Augustus Louis (d. 1725)
- December 5 – Anthony Malone, Irish lawyer and politician (d. 1776)
- December 7 – George Heathcote, English merchant and philanthropist and Tory politician (d. 1768)
- December 8 – Jeremias Friedrich Reuß, German theologian (d. 1777)
- December 9 – Michael Ranft, Protestant Lutheran pastor (d. 1774)
- December 20 – Charles-Augustin de Ferriol d'Argental (d. 1788)
- December 25 – Leopold II, Prince of Anhalt-Dessau, Prussian general (d. 1751)
- date unknown
  - Franciszek Salezy Potocki, Polish magnate official (d. 1772)
  - Ivan Ranger, Austrian painter (d. 1753)

1701

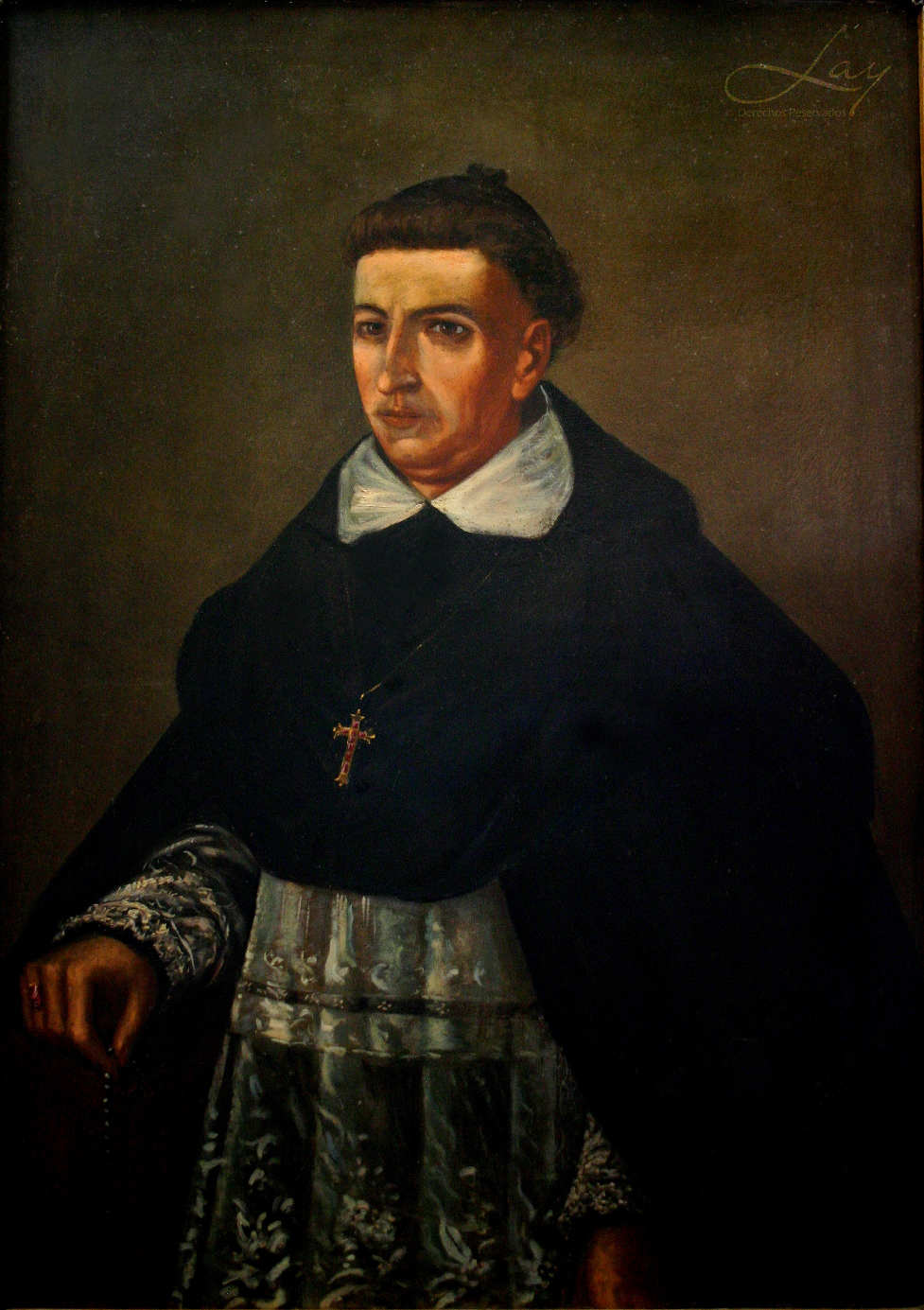
Antonio Alcalde Barriga born 14 March

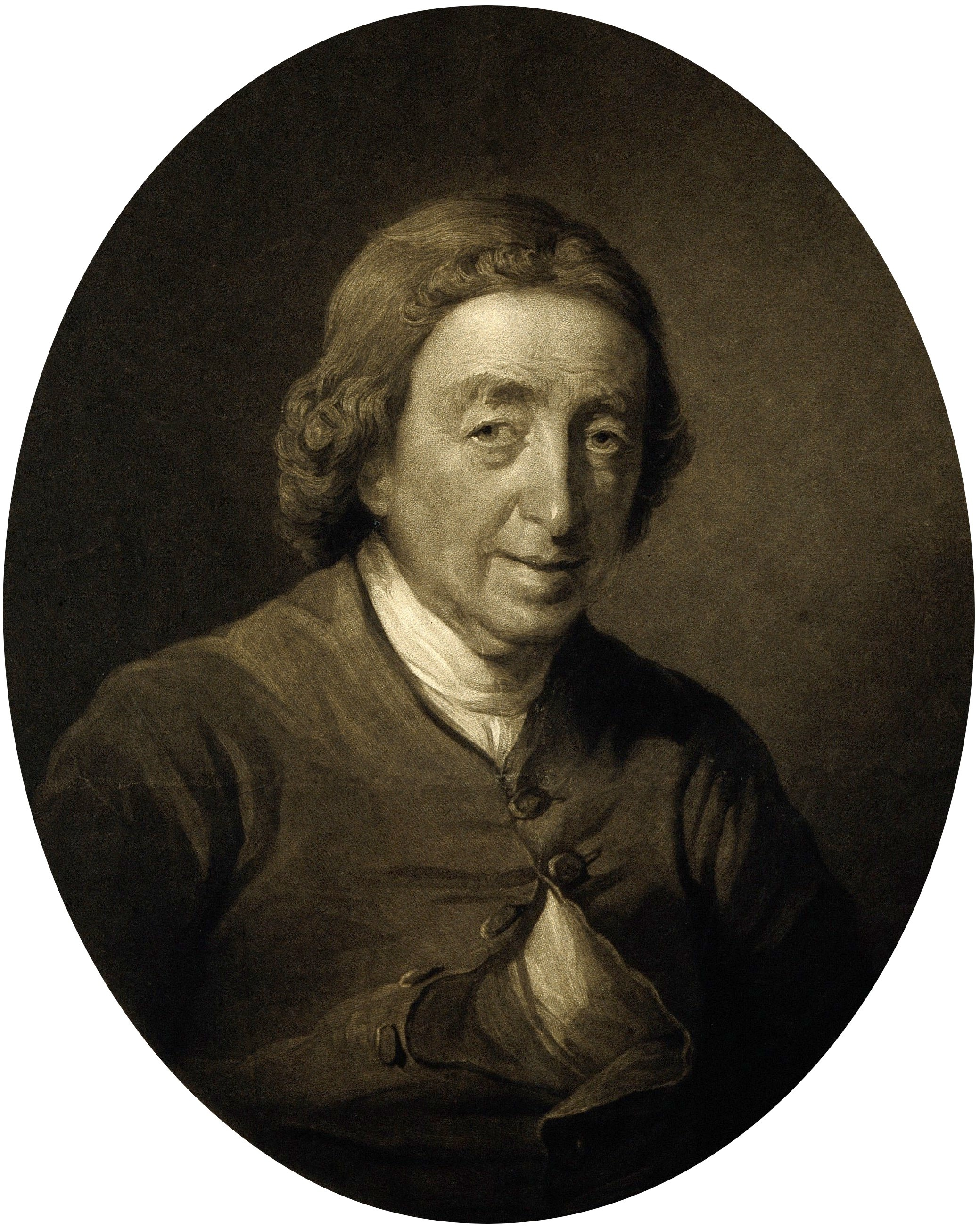
William Emerson (mathematician) born 14 May

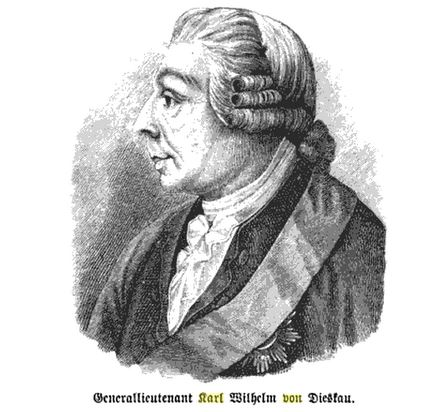
Karl Wilhelm von Dieskau born 9 August

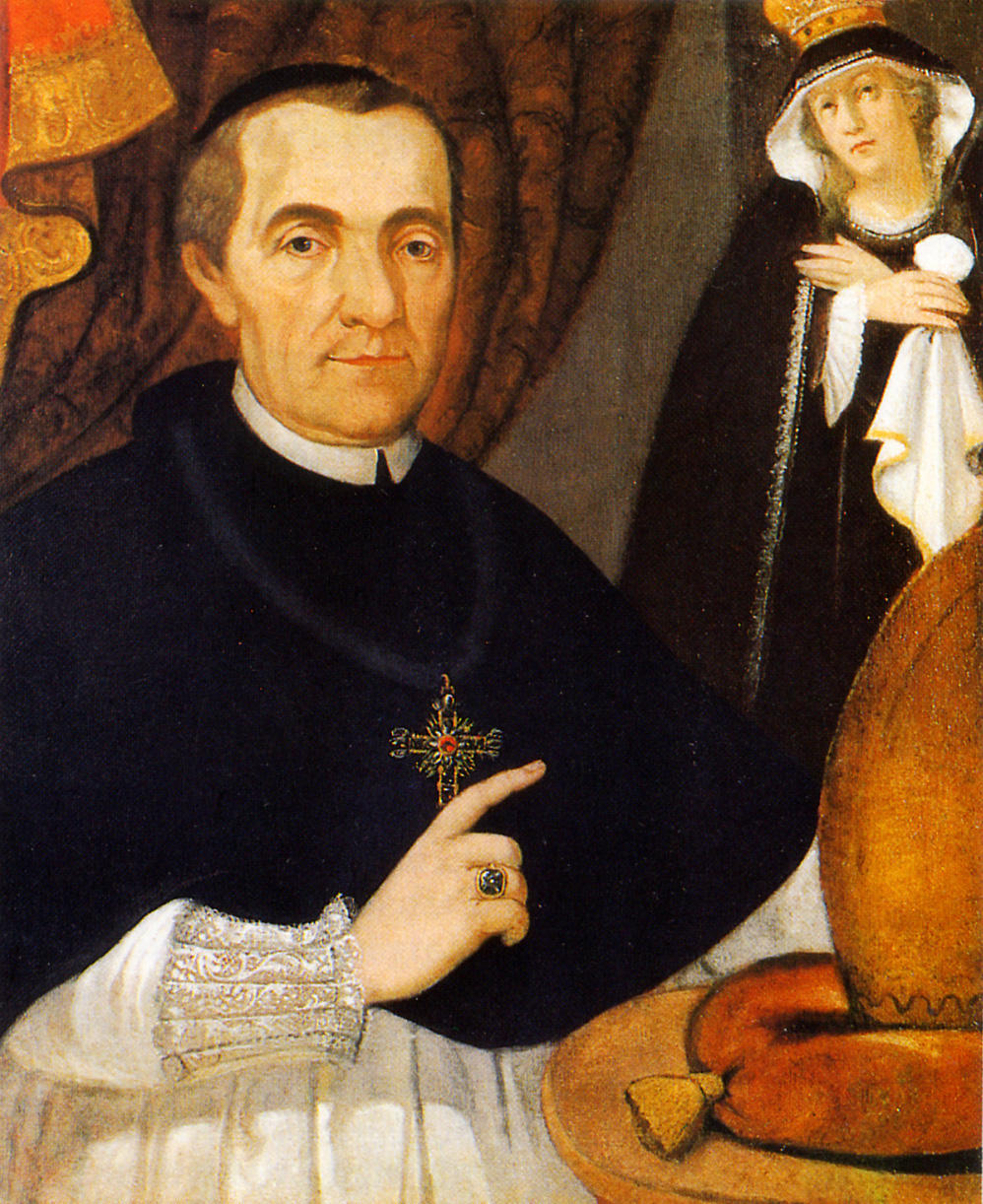
Maurus Xaverius Herbst born 14 September

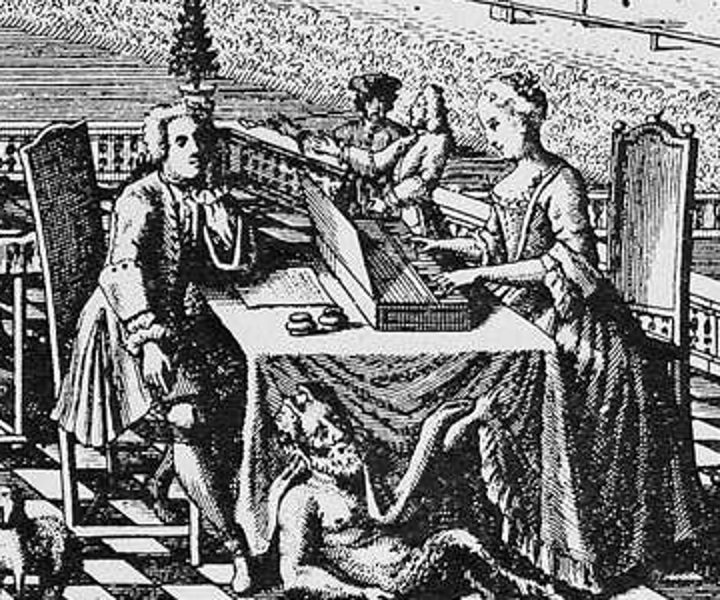
Anna Magdalena Bach born 22 September

Ignatius of Laconi born 10 December

- January 4 – Count Palatine William of Gelnhausen, Imperial Field Marshal (d. 1760)
- January 6 – Georg Ludwig von Bar, German (d. 1767)
- January 14 – Thomas Edwards, silversmith active in colonial Boston (d. 1755)
- January 17 – William Lubbock, British divine (d. 1754)
- January 18 – Johann Jakob Moser, German jurist (d. 1785)
- January 23 – Anne Antoine, Comte d'Aché, French naval officer who became vice admiral (d. 1780)
- January 26 – François Dominique de Barberie de Saint-Contest, French Foreign Minister (d. 1754)
- January 27 – Johann Nikolaus von Hontheim, German historian and theologian (d. 1790)
- January 28
  - Thomas Amory, English dissenting tutor and minister and poet from Taunton (d. 1774)
  - Charles Marie de La Condamine, French mathematician and geographer (d. 1774)
- February 1 – Johan Agrell, late German/Swedish baroque composer (d. 1765)
- February 7 – Christian Ludwig Gersten, German scientist (d. 1762)
- February 8 – Johann Baptist Martinelli, Austrian architect (d. 1754)
- February 11 – Carlo Lodi, Italian painter of the late-Baroque period in Bologna (d. 1765)
- February 14 – Enrique Flórez, Spanish historian (d. 1773)
- February 24 – François-Joseph Hunauld, French anatomist born in Châteaubriant (d. 1742)
- February 25 – Thomas Adam, Church of England clergyman and religious writer (d. 1784)
- February 28 – Jacek Rybiński, Cistercian and the last abbot of the Oliwa monastery (d. 1782)
- March 1 – Johann Jakob Breitinger, Swiss philologist and author (d. 1776)
- March 2 – Lewis Morris, Welsh hydrographer (d. 1765)
- March 6 – Louis-René de Caradeuc de La Chalotais, French jurist on the so-called "Brittany affair" (d. 1785)
- March 7 – Philip Hawkins, MP (d. 1738)
- March 11 – Joseph Leeson, 1st Earl of Milltown, Irish politician (d. 1783)
- March 12 – Johann Friedrich Cotta, German Lutheran theologian (d. 1779)
- March 14 – Antonio Alcalde Barriga, Spanish Roman Catholic prelate; member from the Order of Preachers; Bishop of Guadalajara (d. 1792)
- March 15 – John Carmichael, 3rd Earl of Hyndford (d. 1767)
- March 16 – Daniel Lorenz Salthenius, Swedish theologian (d. 1750)
- March 18 – Niclas Sahlgren, Swedish merchant and philanthropist (d. 1776)
- March 21 – Jacques Bridaine, French Catholic preacher and missionary (d. 1767)
- March 25 – John Goffe, Colonial American soldier (d. 1786)
- April 9 – Giambattista Nolli, Italian architect (d. 1756)
- April 25 – John Bristow, English merchant, politician (d. 1768)
- April 27
  - Sebastian Redford, English Jesuit (d. 1763)
  - Charles Emmanuel III of Sardinia, Duke of Savoy and King of Sardinia from 1730 (d. 1773)
- April 28 – Françoise Basseporte, French painter (d. 1780)
- May 14 – William Emerson, English mathematician (d. 1782)
- May 18 – Charles Lennox, 2nd Duke of Richmond, English aristocrat, philanthropist and cricket patron (d. 1750)
- May 24
  - Jane Scott, Countess of Dalkeith (d. 1729)
  - Johann IX Philipp von Walderdorff, Archbishop-Elector of Trier from 1756 to 1768 (d. 1768)
- May 26 – Jean-Joseph Rallier des Ourmes, French mathematician (d. 1771)
- May 28 – Giuseppe Antonio Pujati, Italian physician (d. 1760)
- May 29 – Georg Friedrich Strass, Alsatian jeweler and inventor of the rhinestone (d. 1773)
- June 2 – Thomas Townshend, British politician (d. 1780)
- June 4
  - Nicolai Eigtved, Danish architect (d. 1754)
  - Theodoor Verhaegen, sculptor from the Southern Netherlands (d. 1759)
- June 9 – Carl Hieronimus Gustmeyer, Danish merchant (d. 1756)
- June 11 – David Carnegie, 5th Earl of Northesk, son of David Carnegie (d. 1741)
- June 17
  - Edward Antill, colonial plantation owner and winemaker (d. 1770)
  - Paula de Odivelas (d. 1768)
- June 19 – François Rebel, French composer (d. 1775)
- June 21 – Otto Magnus von Schwerin, Prussian general in the army of Frederick the Great (d. 1777)
- June 22 – Nicolai Eigtved, Danish architect (d. 1754)
- June 27 – Paul Jacques Malouin, French chemist and physicist (d. 1778)
- July 6 – Mary, Countess of Harold, English aristocrat and philanthropist (d. 1785)
- July 9 – Jean-Frédéric Phélypeaux, Count of Maurepas, French statesman and Count of Maurepas (d. 1781)
- August 4
  - Thomas Blackwell, Scottish classical scholar (d. 1757)
  - Brownlow Cecil, 8th Earl of Exeter, England (d. 1754)
- August 9 – Karl Wilhelm von Dieskau, Prussian lieutenant general, general inspector of the artillery (d. 1777)
- August 20 – Domenico Luigi Valeri, Italian painter and architect active in Marche (d. 1746)
- August 21 – George Bowes, English coal proprietor, Member of Parliament (d. 1760)
- September 6 – Johann Georg Dathan (d. 1749)
- September 14 – Maurus Xaverius Herbst, German Benedictine abbot (d. 1757)
- September 16 – James Cornwallis, Royal Navy officer and politician, second son of Charles Cornwallis (d. 1727)
- September 17 – Paul-Joseph Le Moyne de Longueuil, seigneur and colonial army officer in New France; governor of Trois-Rivières (d. 1778)
- September 21 – George Byng, 3rd Viscount Torrington, British Army general (d. 1750)
- September 22 – Anna Magdalena Bach, accomplished German singer, second wife of Johann Sebastian Bach (d. 1760)
- September 23 – Bredo von Munthe af Morgenstierne, Norwegian civil servant (d. 1757)
- September 28 – Stephen Hansen, Danish industrialist (d. 1770)
- September 30 – Enrico Enríquez, Italian Roman Catholic cardinal (d. 1756)
- October 3 – Isaac Norris, merchant and statesman in provincial Pennsylvania (d. 1766)
- October 15 – Marie-Marguerite d'Youville, Canadian saint (d. 1771)
- October 18 – Charles le Beau, French historical writer (d. 1778)
- October 20 – Jean-Baptiste de La Noue, French actor and playwright (d. 1760)
- October 22 – Maria Amalia, Holy Roman Empress (d. 1756)
- October 24 – Jacques Legardeur de Saint-Pierre, Canadian military commander (d. 1755)
- October 28 – Simón de Anda y Salazar, Governor-General of the Philippines (d. 1776)
- October 30 – Anton Gogeisl, German astronomer (d. 1771)
- October 31 – William Ellery, Sr., Rhode Island colonial deputy governor (d. 1764)
- November 3 – Smart Lethieullier, English antiquary (d. 1760)
- November 5 or 1702 – Pietro Longhi, Venetian painter (d. 1785)
- November 6 – Jean-Baptiste Malter, French dancer and dance master (d. 1746)
- November 10 – Johann Joseph Couven, German Baroque architect (d. 1763)
- November 21 – John Arundell, 4th Baron Arundell of Trerice (d. 1768)
- November 27 – Anders Celsius, Swedish astronomer (d. 1744)
- November 28
  - James Burrow, British scholar (d. 1782)
  - Daniel Wray, English antiquary and Fellow of the Royal Society (d. 1783)
- December 9 – Elisha Freeman, Canadian politician (d. 1777)
- December 10 – Ignatius of Laconi (d. 1781)
- December 11 – Charles Goore, English merchant and politician (d. 1783)
- December 16 – Olof Arenius, Swedish portrait painter (d. 1766)
- December 17 – Bernard of Bologna, Italian theologian (d. 1770)
- December 21
  - Louis Daniel Arnault de Nobleville, French physician and naturalist (d. 1778)
  - Guillaume Taraval, French painter (d. 1750)
  - Taylor White, British judge (d. 1772)

1702

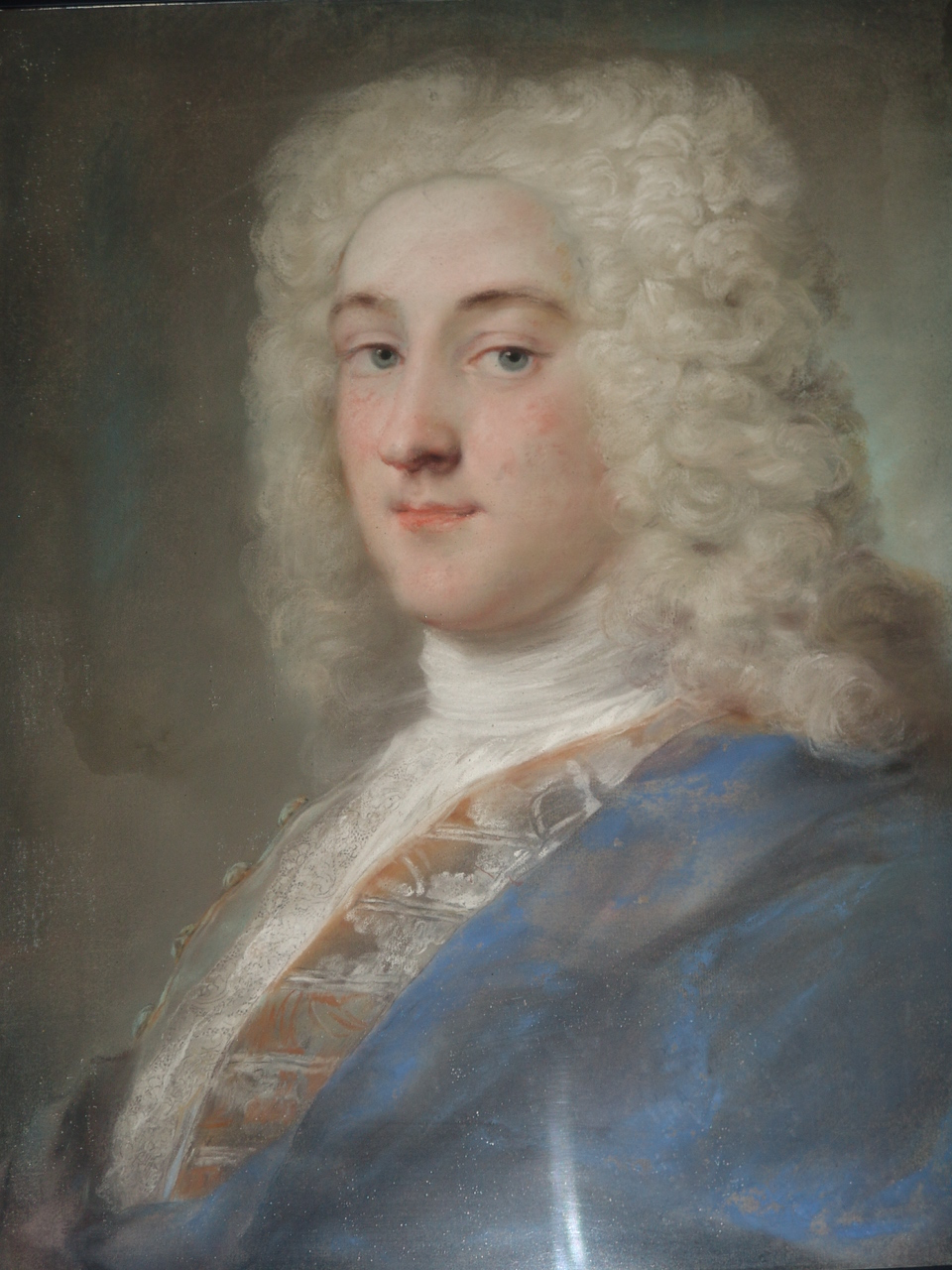
Alan Brodrick, 2nd Viscount Midleton born 31 January

Giovanni Carmine Pellerano born 6 February

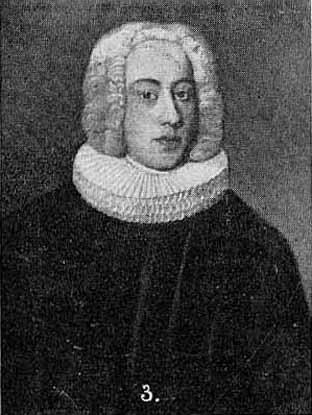
Rasmus Paludan born 26 February

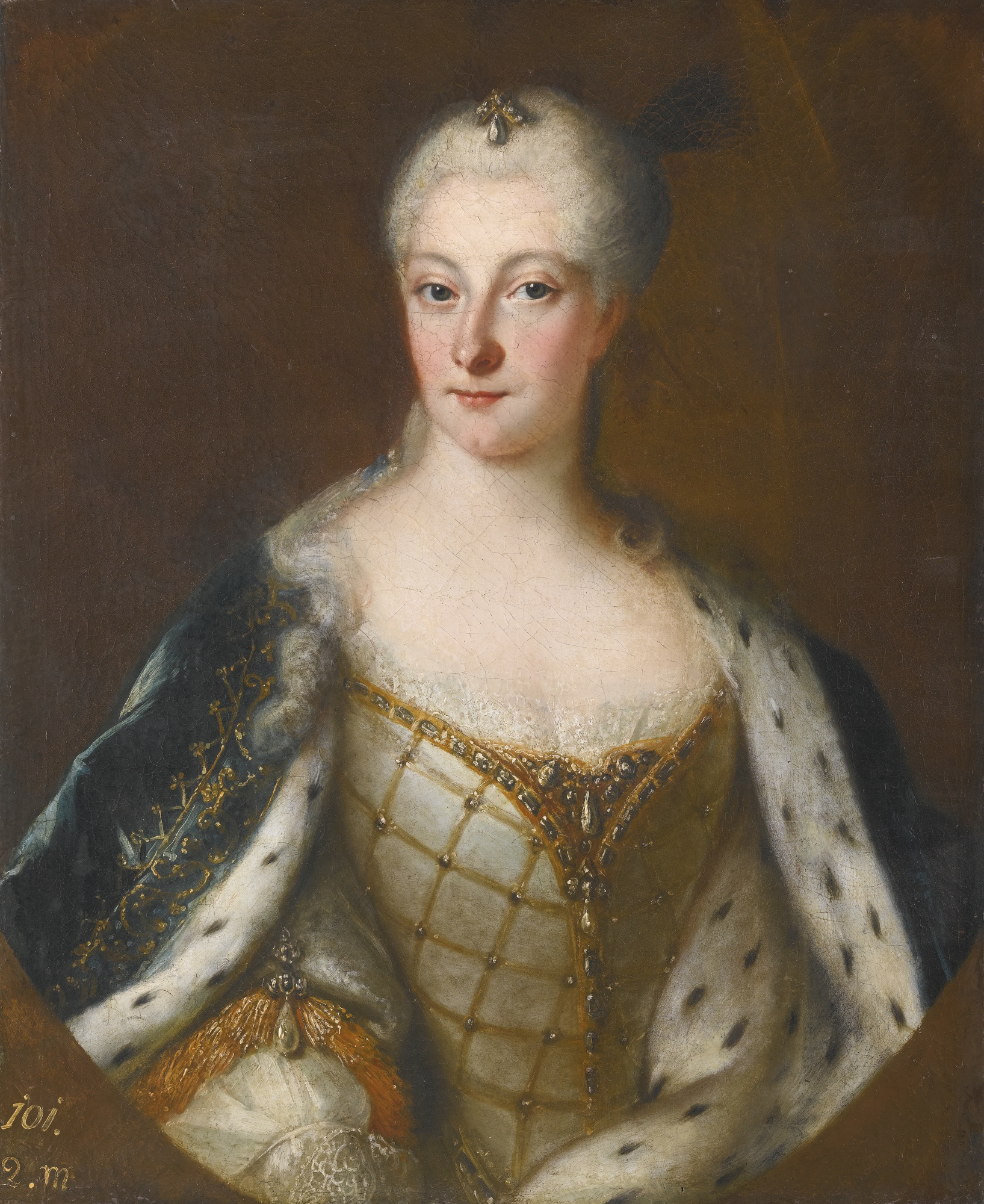
Henrietta Maria of Brandenburg-Schwedt born 2 March

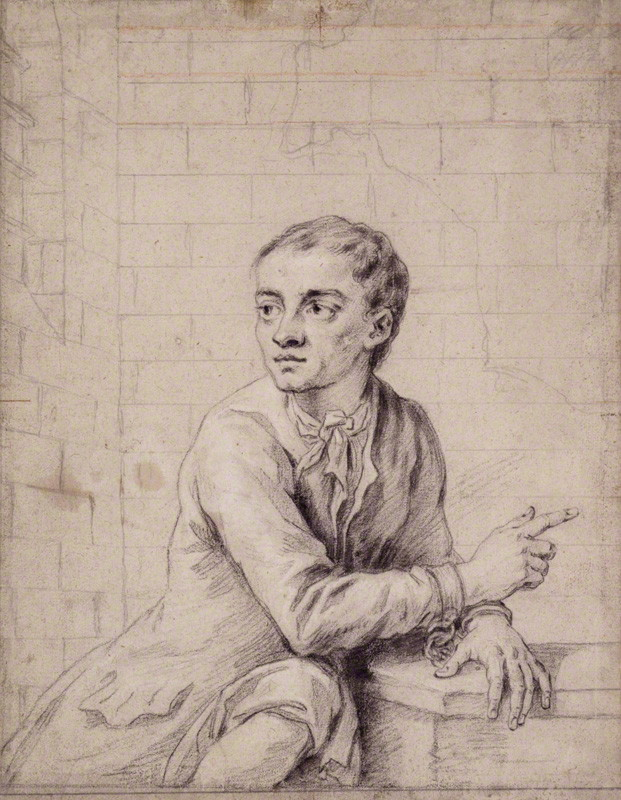
Jack Sheppard born 4 March

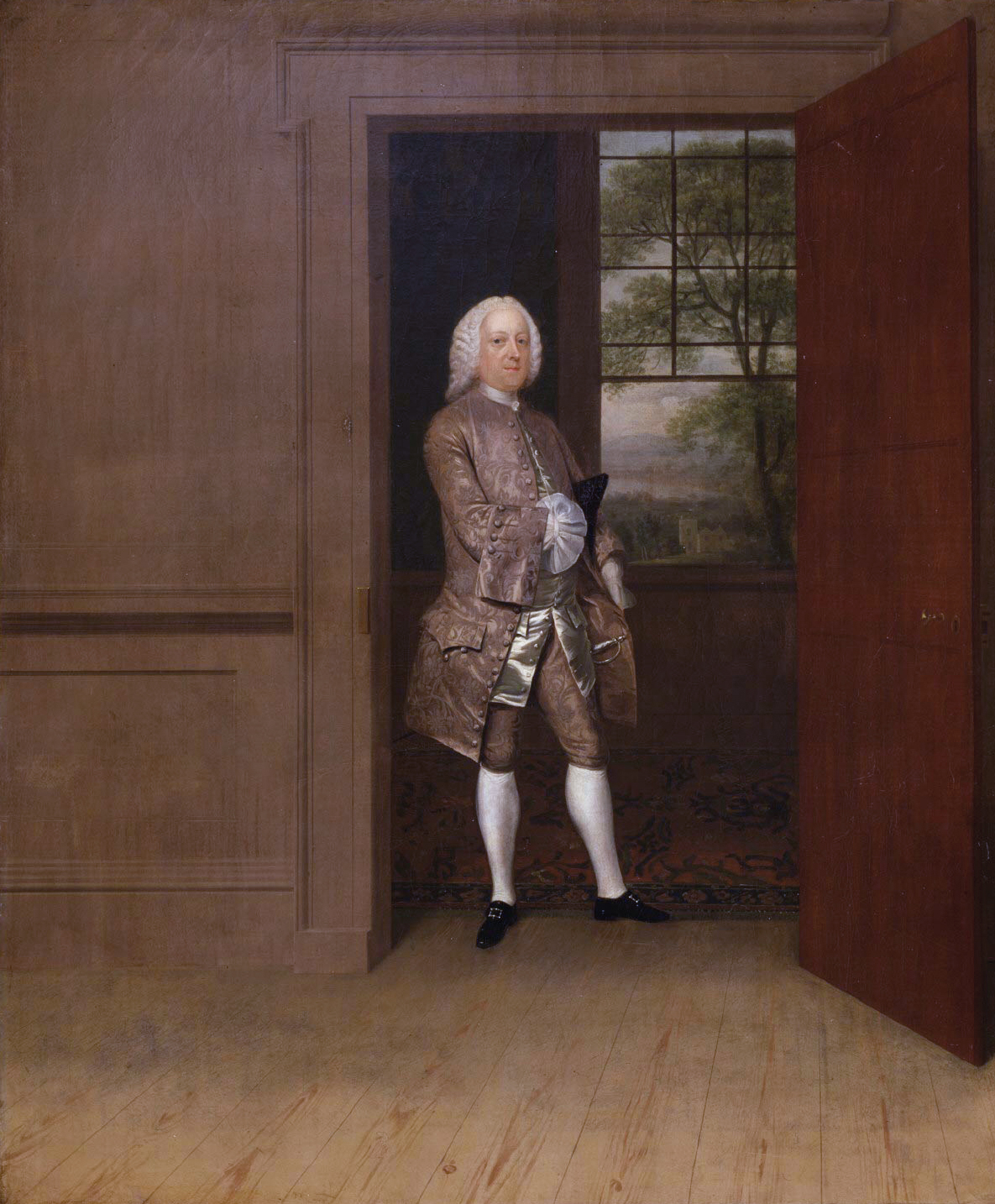
Thomas Penn born 20 March

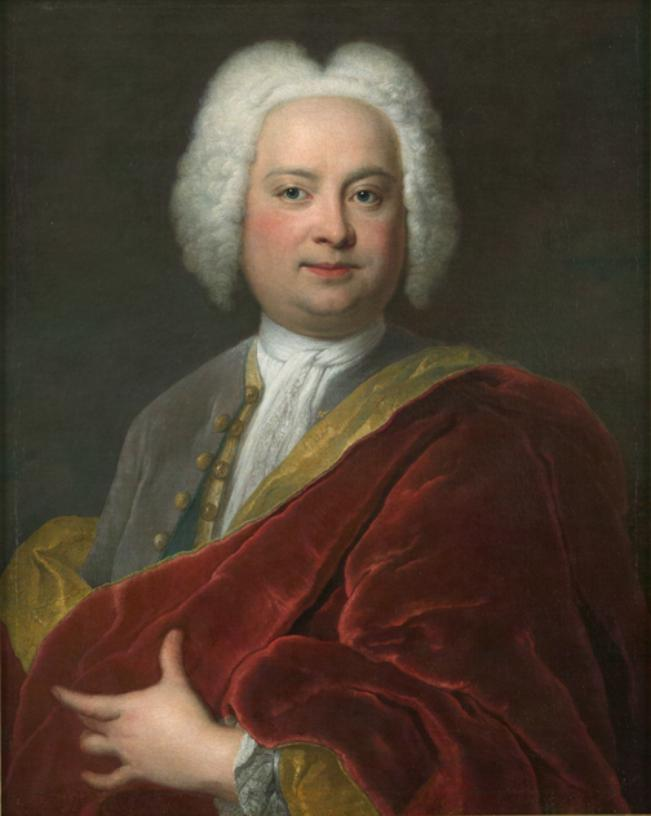
Willem van Keppel, 2nd Earl of Albemarle born 5 June

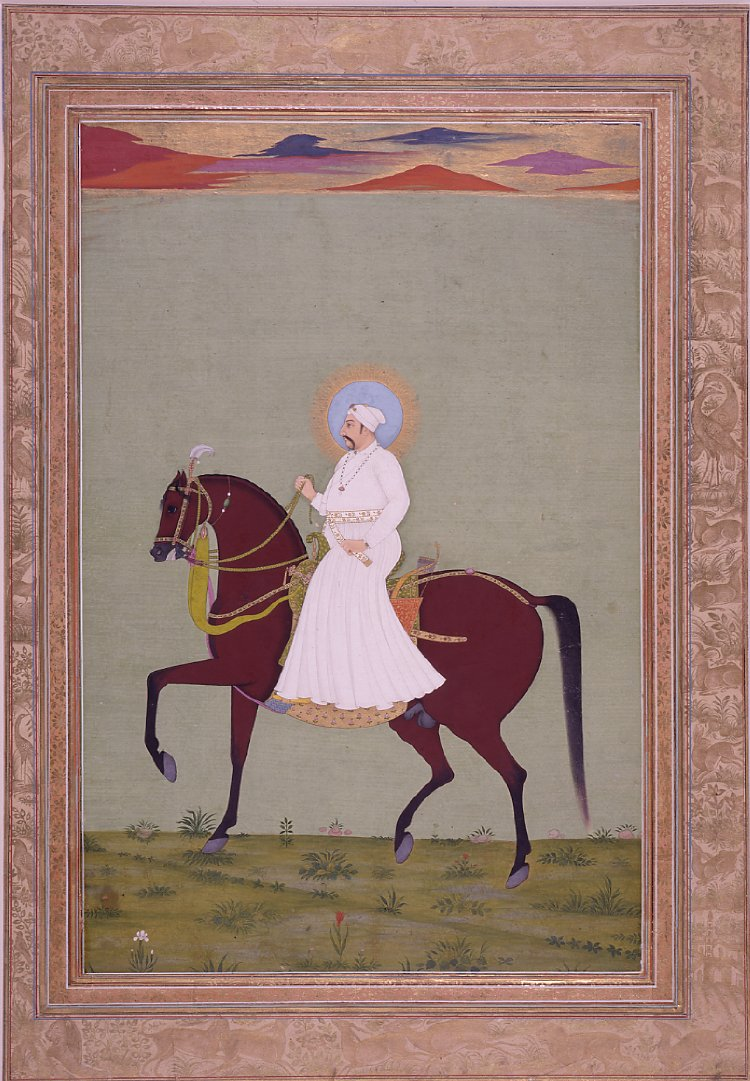
Muhammad Shah born 7 August

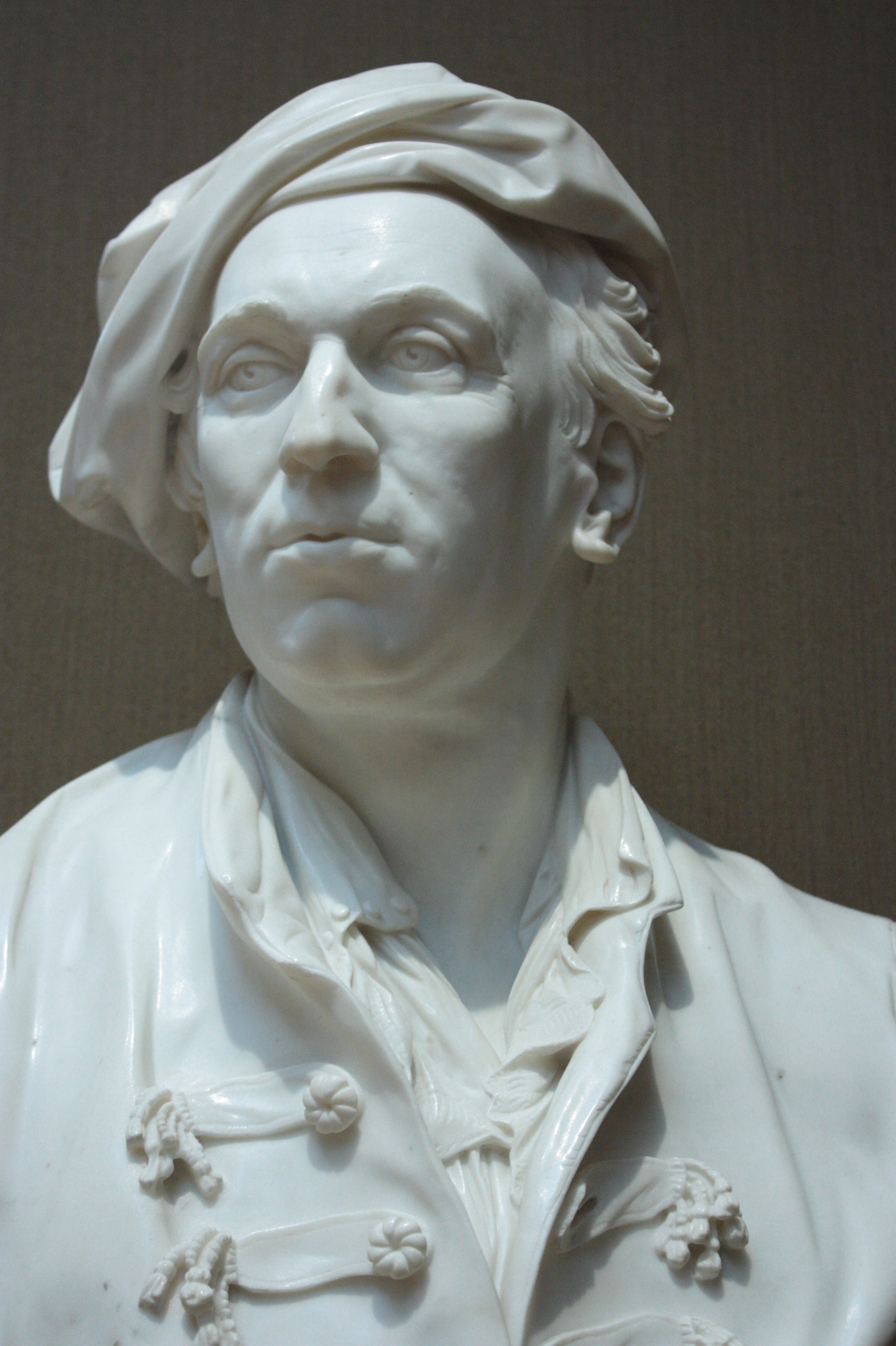
Louis-François Roubiliac born 31 August

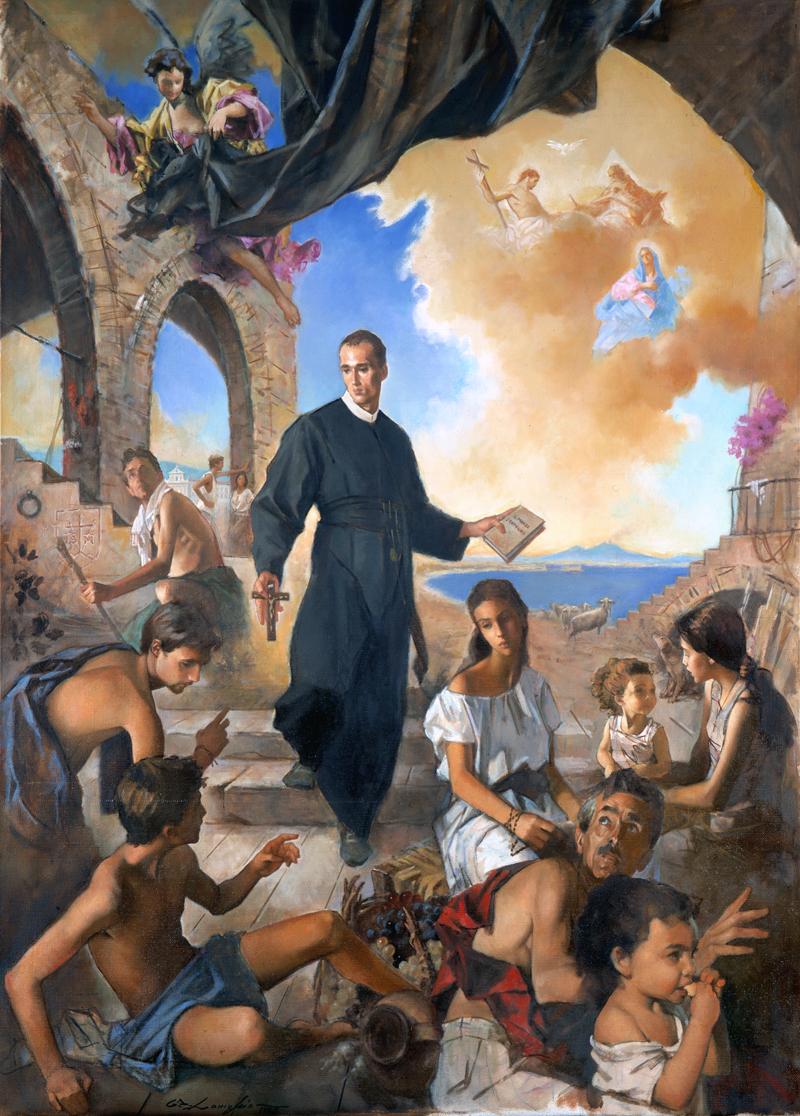
Januarius Maria Sarnelli born 12 September

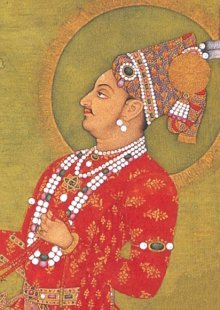
Abhai Singh of Marwar born 7 November

- January 2 – Nabeshima Naotsune, Japanese daimyō (d. 1749)
- January 6
  - Johann Adam von Ickstatt, German educator and director of the University of Ingolstadt (d. 1776)
  - José de Nebra, Spanish composer (d. 1768)
- January 10 – Johannes Zick, German fresco painter (d. 1762)
- January 12
  - Jacques Aved, French painter and Rococo portraitist (d. 1766)
  - Józef Andrzej Załuski, Polish Catholic priest (d. 1774)
- January 13 – Thomas Arthur, comte de Lally, French general of Irish Jacobite ancestry (d. 1766)
- January 14 – Emperor Nakamikado, of Japan (d. 1737)
- January 18 – Sava II Petrović-Njegoš, Metropolitan of Cetinje (d. 1782)
- January 24 – Frederica Henriette of Anhalt-Bernburg, member of the House of Ascania by birth and Princess of Anhalt-Köthen by marriage (d. 1723)
- January 26 – Johann Caspar Scheuchzer, Swiss naturalist (d. 1729)
- January 31 – Alan Brodrick, 2nd Viscount Midleton, English cricketer (d. 1747)
- February 3
  - Michael Adelbulner, German mathematician (d. 1779)
  - Giovanni Battista Vaccarini, Italian architect (d. 1768)
- February 6 – Giovanni Carmine Pellerano, Italian Catholic prelate, member of the Knights Hospitaller (d. 1783)
- February 7 – Carl August Thielo, Danish composer (d. 1763)
- February 10
  - Jean-Pierre Guignon, Franco-Italian composer and violinist (d. 1774)
  - Carlo Marchionni, Italian architect (d. 1786)
- February 12 – Robert Hale, Massachusetts physician, soldier (d. 1767)
- February 26 – Rasmus Paludan, Norwegian theologian and priest (d. 1759)
- February 27
  - Enrichetta d'Este, Duchess of Parma (d. 1777)
  - Johann Valentin Görner, German composer (d. 1762)
- March 2
  - Henrietta Maria of Brandenburg-Schwedt, granddaughter of the "Great Elector" Frederick William (d. 1782)
  - Charles Stourton, 15th Baron Stourton, son of Charles Stourton (1669–1739) (d. 1753)
- March 4 – Jack Sheppard, British burglar and escaper (d. 1724)
- March 13 – Burkat Shudi, English harpsichord maker of Swiss origin (d. 1773)
- March 19 – Thomas Penn, son of American colonial leader William Penn (d. 1775)
- March 21 – Bento de Moura Portugal (d. 1766)
- March 22 – Matthias de Visch, Flemish painter of history paintings and portraits (d. 1765)
- March 25 – Pieter Teyler van der Hulst, wealthy Dutch Mennonite merchant and banker (d. 1778)
- March 27 – Johann Ernst Eberlin, German composer and organist (d. 1762)
- March 28 – Ignacio de Luzán, Spanish critic and poet (d. 1754)
- March 29 – Cesare Sportelli, Italian Roman Catholic Redemptorist lawyer (d. 1750)
- March 31 – Barthélemy-Christophe Fagan, French playwright (d. 1755)
- April 5
  - Stephen Leake, English numismatist, officer of arms at the College of Arms in London (d. 1773)
  - Solomon Lombard (d. 1781)
- April 7 – William Rawlinson Earle (d. 1774)
- April 10 – Jonathan Tyers (d. 1767)
- April 16 – Juan de Balmaseda y Censano Beltrán (d. 1778)
- April 20 – Zenón de Somodevilla, 1st Marquess of Ensenada, Spanish noble (d. 1781)
- May 2 – Friedrich Christoph Oetinger, German Lutheran theologian and theosopher (d. 1782)
- May 3 – John St John, 2nd Viscount St John (d. 1748)
- May 8 – Andrew Lauder, Burgess of the Royal Burgh of Lauder (1737) (d. 1769)
- May 10 – Abraham Lehn, Danish landowner (d. 1757)
- May 11 – Isaac Greenwood, American mathematician (d. 1745)
- May 12 – Louis Philogène Brûlart, vicomte de Puisieulx, French foreign minister (d. 1770)
- May 16 – George Nevill, 14th Baron Bergavenny (d. 1723)
- May 21 – John Rous, Royal Navy officer during King George's War and the Seven Years' War (d. 1760)
- May 24 – Joseph Friedrich Ernst, Prince of Hohenzollern-Sigmaringen, fifth Prince (d. 1769)
- June 1 – John Hancock Jr., colonial American clergyman, father of politician John Hancock (d. 1744)
- June 5
  - Frederik Arentz, Lutheran bishop of Bjørgvin from 1762 to 1774 (d. 1779)
  - Willem van Keppel, 2nd Earl of Albemarle (d. 1754)
- June 7 – Louis George, Margrave of Baden-Baden from 1707 until his death (d. 1761)
- June 9 – William Townshend, British Member of Parliament (d. 1738)
- June 13 – Michał Kazimierz "Rybeńko" Radziwiłł, Polish-Lithuanian noble (d. 1762)
- June 19 – Frederick Augustus Rutowsky, German general (d. 1764)
- June 26 – Philip Doddridge, English religious leader (d. 1751)
- June 30 – Elizabeth Timothy, colonial American printer and newspaper publisher in South Carolina who worked for Benjamin Franklin (d. 1757)
- July 6 – Franz Anton Maichelbeck, German organist and composer (d. 1750)
- July 18 – Maria Clementina Sobieska, Polish noble (d. 1735)
- July 19 – Philemon Ewer, English shipbuilder (d. 1750)
- July 20 – Christian Siegmund Georgi, evangelical theologian at Wittenberg, Germany (d. 1771)
- July 22 – Alessandro Besozzi, Italian composer and virtuoso oboist (d. 1793)
- July 31 – Jean Denis Attiret, French Jesuit missionary and painter (d. 1768)
- August 2 – Dietrich of Anhalt-Dessau, German prince of the House of Ascania (d. 1769)
- August 3
  - Sir Walter Bagot, 5th Baronet (d. 1768)
  - George Rooke, priest (d. 1754)
- August 7 – Muhammad Shah, Mughal emperor of India (d. 1748)
- August 14 – Philip Carteret Webb, English barrister (d. 1770)
- August 16 – Roque Joaquín de Alcubierre, military engineer in the Spanish Army, discovered architectural remains at Pompeii and Herculaneum (d. 1780)
- August 26
  - George Carpenter, 2nd Baron Carpenter, of England (d. 1749)
  - Judith Madan, English poet (d. 1781)
- August 28 – Jean Philippe d'Orléans, illegitimate son of future French regent Philippe d'Orleans (d. 1748)
- August 31 – Louis-François Roubiliac, French sculptor who worked in England (d. 1762)
- September 2 – John Evans, Welsh Anglican cleric (d. 1782)
- September 4 – Legall de Kermeur, French chess player (d. 1792)
- September 6 – Joseph Bonnier de la Mosson, French aristocrat (d. 1744)
- September 12
  - Robert Hazard, Rhode Island colonial deputy governor (d. 1751)
  - Januarius Maria Sarnelli, Beatified Italian (d. 1746)
- September 14
  - Ercole Lelli, Italian painter of the late-Baroque (d. 1766)
  - Adriana Maas, Dutch stage actress (d. 1746)
- September 20 – Francesco Serao, Italian physician (d. 1783)
- October 4
  - John Lindsay, 20th Earl of Crawford, British Army general (d. 1749)
  - Honoré Armand de Villars, French nobleman, soldier, politician (d. 1770)
- October 5 – Prince Joseph of Saxe-Hildburghausen, German prince (d. 1787)
- October 22 – Frédéric Maurice Casimir de La Tour d'Auvergne, French prince (d. 1723)
- October 25 – Christoph II von Dohna, Prussian general (d. 1762)
- October 29 – Tako Hajo Jelgersma, Dutch painter (d. 1795)
- November 5 – Grégoire Orlyk, Ukrainian-born French Lieutenant General (d. 1759)
- November 6 – Josias Weitbrecht, German professor of medicine and anatomy in Russia (d. 1747)
- November 7 – Abhai Singh of Marwar, Raja of Marwar (Jodhpur) Kingdom (r (d. 1749)
- November 9 – Jacques-Georges Chauffepié, French biographer, Calvinist minister and preacher (d. 1786)
- November 13 – Dominic Vallarsi, Italian priest (d. 1771)
- November 14 – Francis Gashry (d. 1762)
- November 20
  - Townsend Andrews (d. 1737)
  - Winchcomb Packer (d. 1746)
  - Apollos Rivoire (d. 1754)
- December 14 – Stephen Sewall, judge in colonial Massachusetts (d. 1760)
- December 17
  - Robert Knight, 1st Earl of Catherlough, Member of the British Parliament (d. 1772)
  - Marguerite de Lubert, French woman of letters (d. 1785)
- December 21 – Tommaso Crudeli, Florentine free thinker who was imprisoned by the Roman Inquisition (d. 1745)
- December 22 – Jean-Étienne Liotard, French painter (d. 1789)
- Margareta Momma, Swedish writer, journalist and editor (d. 1772)
- Giuseppa Barbapiccola, Italian natural philosopher, poet and translator (d. 1740)

1703

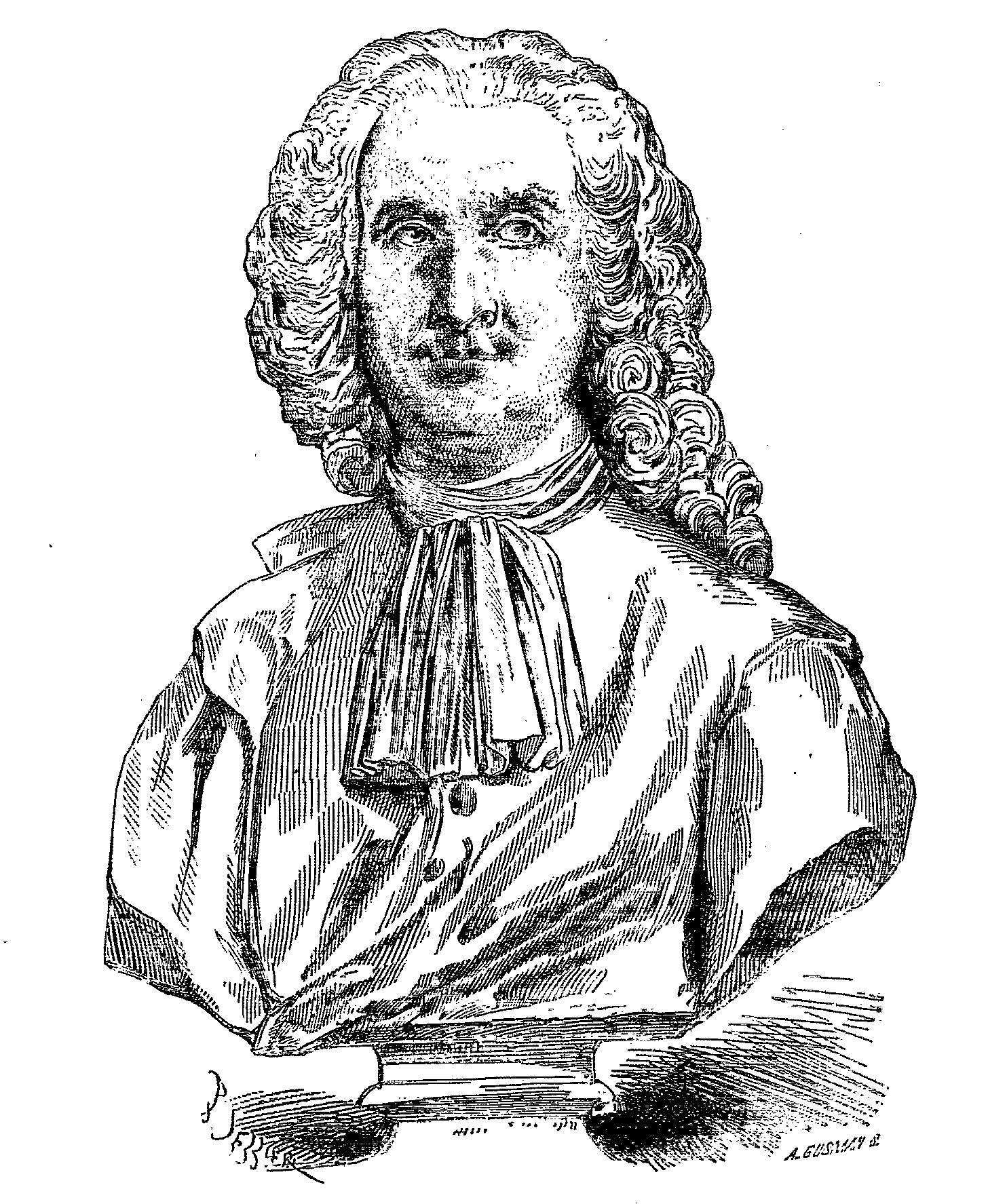
Daniel-Charles Trudaine born 3 January

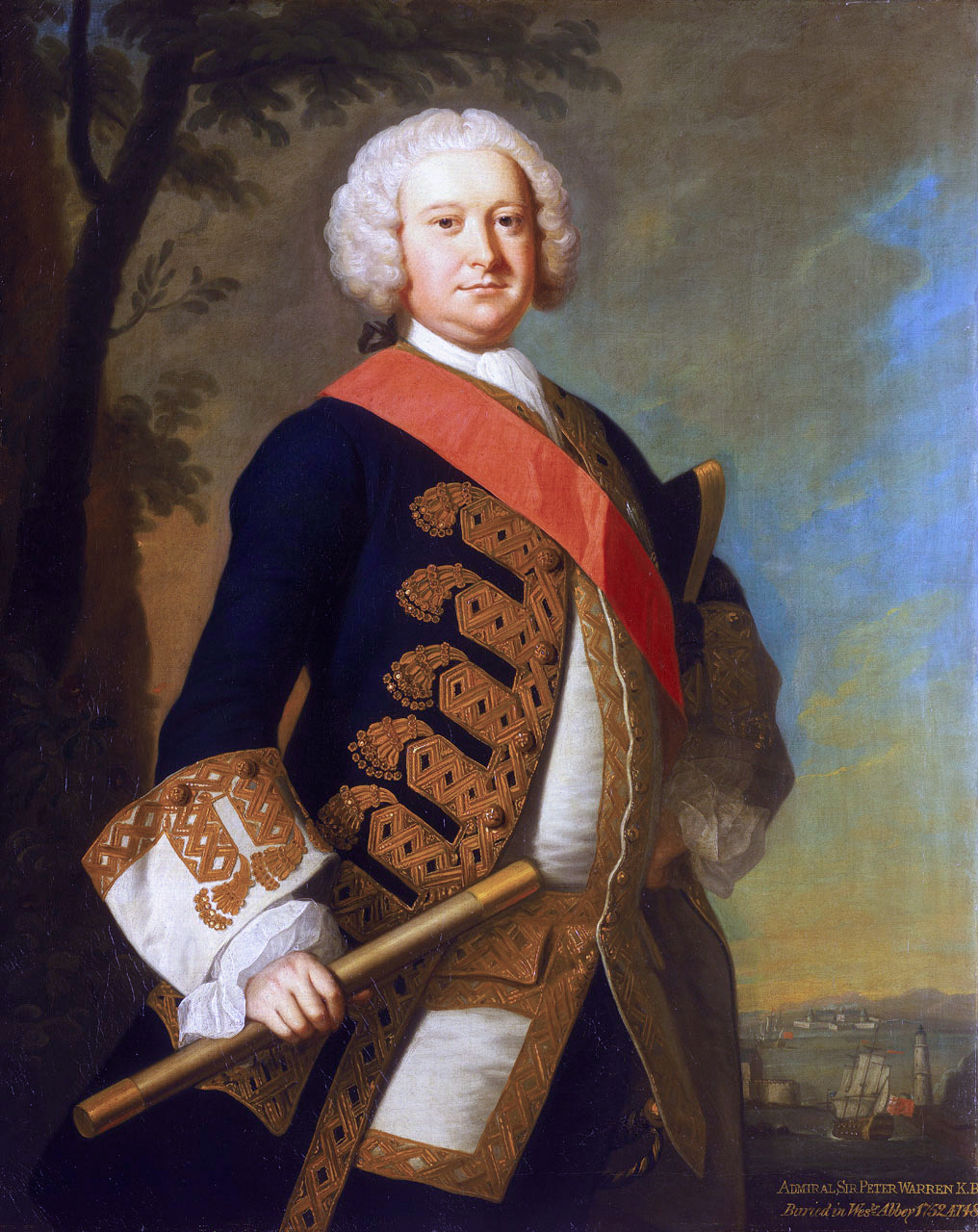
Peter Warren (Royal Navy officer) born 10 March

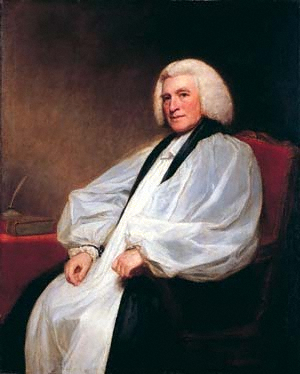
Edmund Law born 6 June

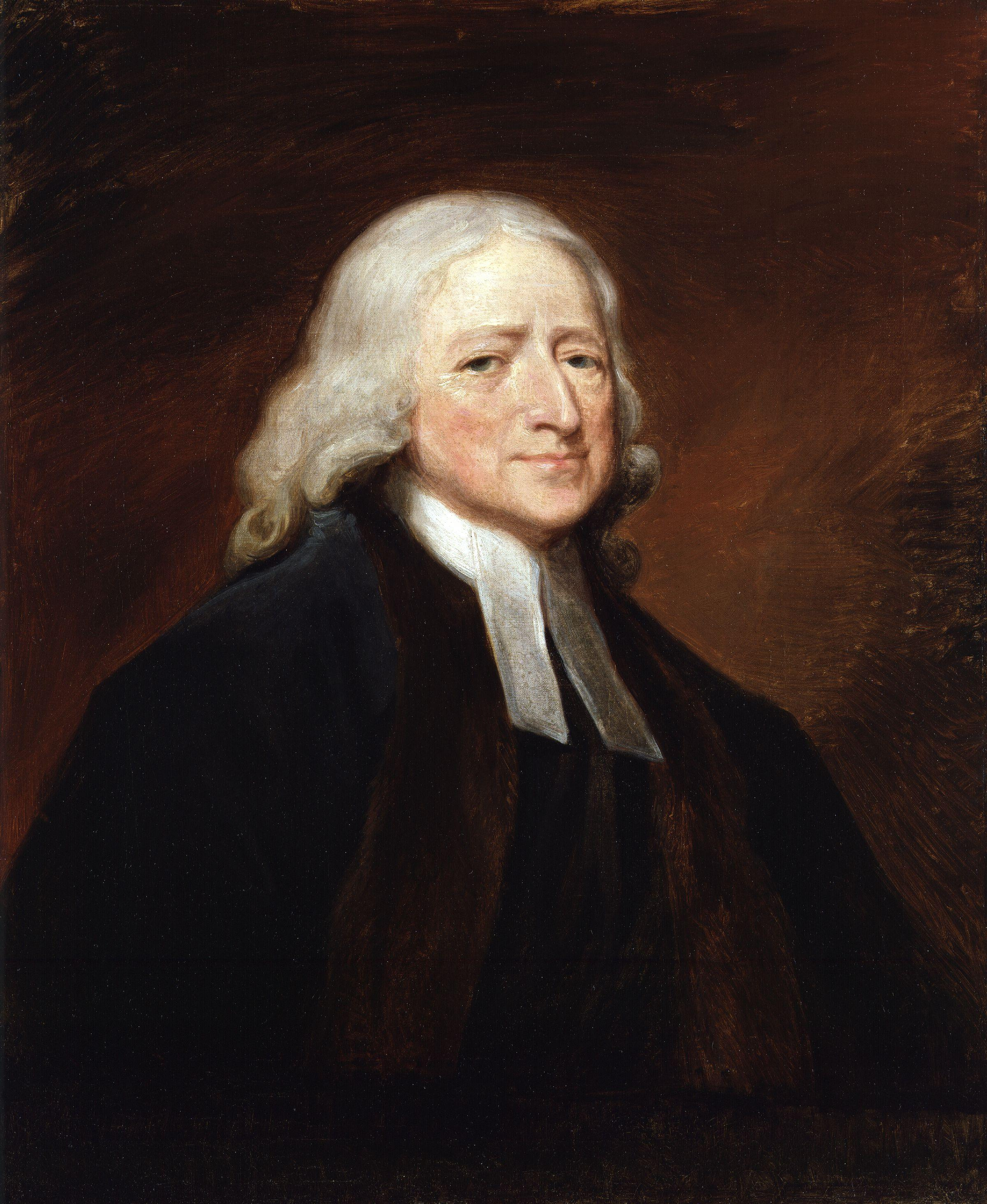
John Wesley born 28 June

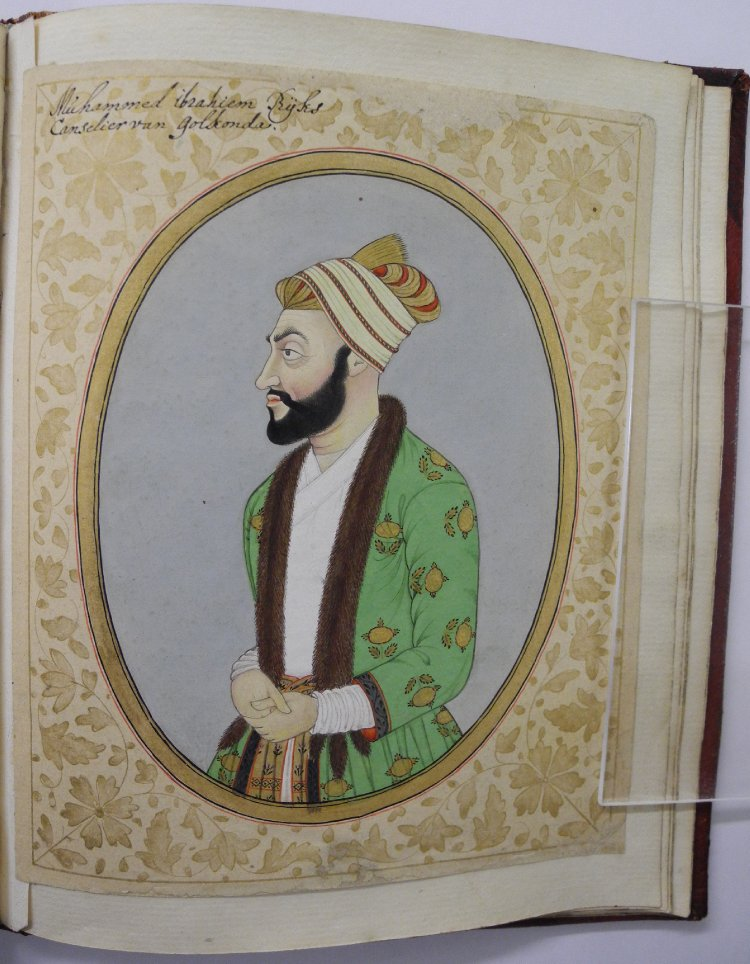
Muhammad Ibrahim (Mughal emperor) born 9 August

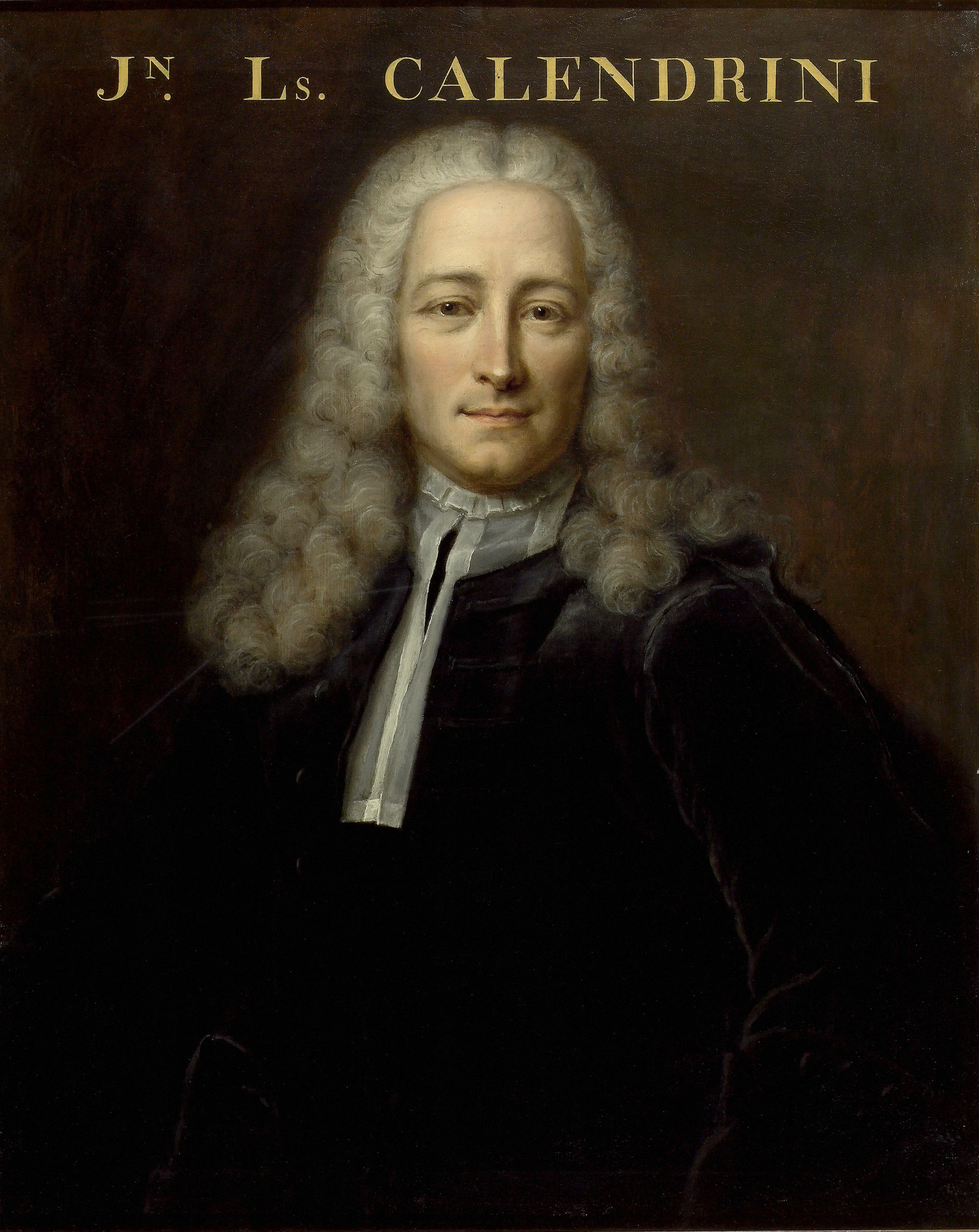
Jean-Louis Calandrini born 30 August

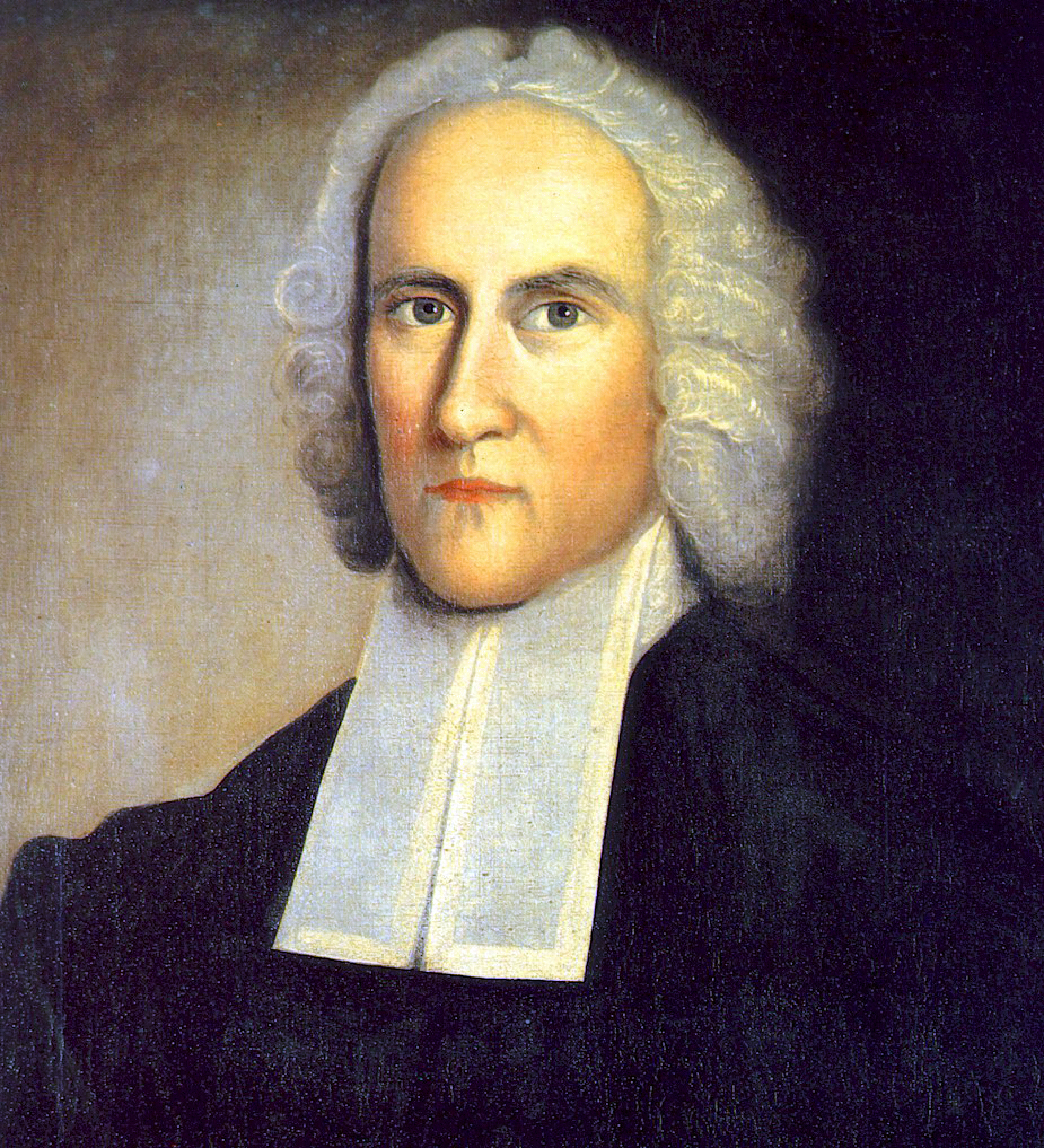
Jonathan Edwards (theologian) born 5 October

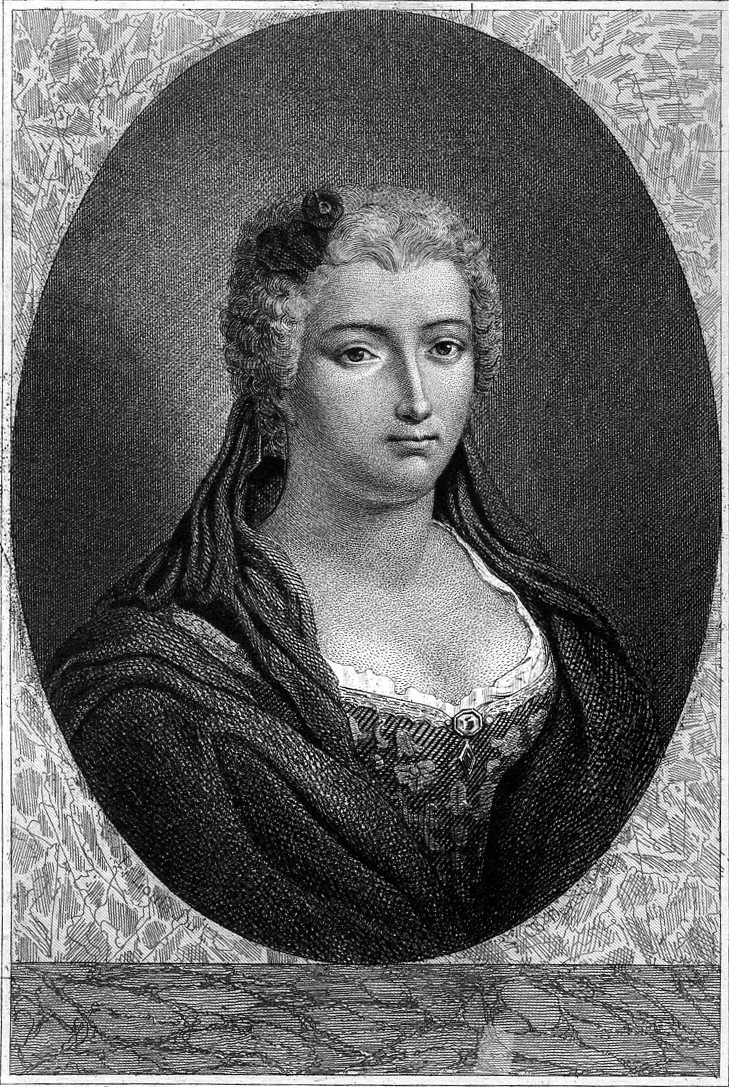
Louise Levesque born 23 November

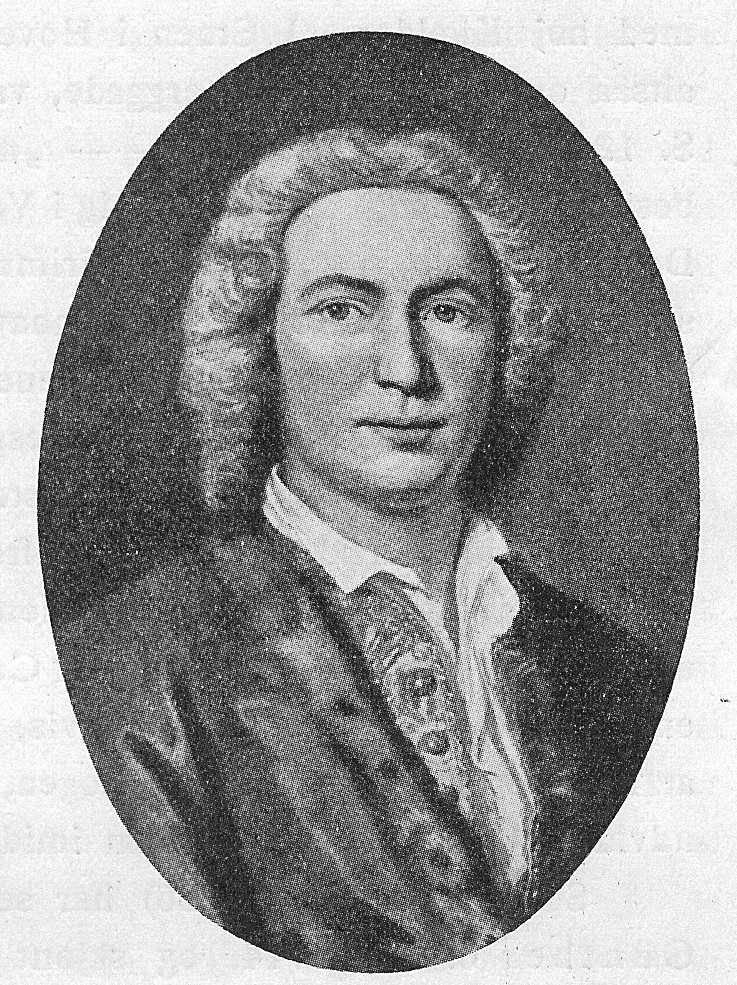
Simon Carl Stanley born 12 December

- January 1 – Heinrich Sigismund von der Heyde, Prussian army commander (d. 1765)
- January 2 – George Cholmondeley, 3rd Earl of Cholmondeley, English politician (d. 1770)
- January 3 – Daniel-Charles Trudaine, French administrator and civil engineer (d. 1769)
- January 5
  - James Hamilton, 5th Duke of Hamilton, Scottish peer (d. 1743)
  - Paul d'Albert de Luynes, French archbishop (d. 1788)
- January 8 – André Levret, French obstetrician, medical practitioner in Paris (d. 1780)
- January 10 – Christoph Birkmann, German theologian and minister (d. 1771)
- January 15
  - Henriette Louise de Bourbon, French princess by birth, member of the House of Bourbon (d. 1772)
  - John Brydges, Marquess of Carnarvon, English politician (d. 1727)
  - Johann Ernst Hebenstreit, German physician and naturalist (d. 1757)
- January 20 – Joseph-Hector Fiocco, Belgian composer and violinist (d. 1741)
- January 22 – Antoine Walsh, Irish-French slave trader and Jacobite (d. 1763)
- January 29 – Carlmann Kolb, German priest (d. 1765)
- January 31 – André-Joseph Panckoucke, French author and bookseller (d. 1753)
- February 2 – Richard Morris, Welsh writer and editor (d. 1779)
- February 3 – Jean Philippe de Bela, French military figure and Basque writer and historian (d. 1796)
- February 4
  - Jean Saas, French historian and bibliographer (d. 1774)
  - Andrew Stone, significant figure in the British royal circle, Member of Parliament (d. 1773)
- February 5 – Gilbert Tennent, Irish-born religious leader (d. 1764)
- February 8
  - Corrado Giaquinto, Italian Rococo painter (d. 1765)
  - François-Pierre Rigaud de Vaudreuil, soldier in New France (d. 1779)
- February 13 – Robert Dodsley, English bookseller, poet, playwright and miscellaneous writer (d. 1764)
- February 27 – Lord Sidney Beauclerk, English politician and fortune hunter (d. 1744)
- March 1 – Philip Tisdall, Attorney-General for Ireland (d. 1777)
- March 4 – Nicolas René Berryer, French magistrate and politician (d. 1762)
- March 5 (N. S.) – Vasily Trediakovsky, Russian poet (d. 1768)
- March 10 – Peter Warren, British Royal Navy officer (d. 1752)
- March 21 – Georg Andreas Sorge, Thuringian organist (d. 1778)
- March 23 – Cajsa Warg, Swedish cookbook author (d. 1769)
- April 8 – Benoît-Joseph Boussu, French violin maker (d. 1773)
- April 10 – Pierre Daubenton, French lawyer (d. 1776)
- April 24 – José Francisco de Isla, Spanish Jesuit (d. 1781)
- May 2 – James West, English antiquary (d. 1772)
- May 8 – Gottlob Harrer, German composer and choir leader (d. 1755)
- May 10 – John Winslow, British Army officer (d. 1774)
- May 12 – Countess Sophie Theodora of Castell-Remlingen, German noblewoman (d. 1777)
- May 14 – David Brearly, delegate to the U.S. Constitutional Convention (d. 1785)
- May 18
  - Jean Daullé, French engraver (d. 1763)
  - İbrahim Hakkı Erzurumi, Turkish Sufi saint (d. 1780)
- May 20 – René Lièvre de Besançon, French archer (d. 1739)
- June 6 – Edmund Law, priest in the Church of England (d. 1787)
- June 10 – Walter Butler, 16th Earl of Ormonde, Irish landowner (d. 1783)
- June 21 – Joseph Lieutaud, French physician (d. 1780)
- June 24 – Anne van Keppel, Countess of Albemarle (d. 1789)
- June 26 – Thomas Clap, first president of Yale University (d. 1767)
- June 28 – John Wesley, English founder of Methodism and anti-slavery activist (d. 1791)
- July 7 – Kenrick Prescot, English Anglican priest and academic (d. 1779)
- July 9 – Edward Shippen III, American merchant and mayor of Philadelphia (d. 1781)
- July 12 – Nicholas Hewetson, Anglican priest in Ireland (d. 1761)
- July 15 – Axel Lagerbielke, Swedish admiral and statesman (d. 1782)
- July 17 – Thomas Hancock, merchant in colonial Boston (d. 1764)
- August 2 – Lorenzo Ricci, Italian Jesuit leader (d. 1775)
- August 4 – Louis, Duke of Orléans, member of the royal family of France (d. 1752)
- August 9 – Muhammad Ibrahim, claimant to the throne of India (d. 1746)
- August 15 – Jacob Bicker Raije, writer from the Northern Netherlands (d. 1777)
- August 24 – François-Marie Le Marchand de Lignery, colonial military leader in the French province of Canada (d. 1759)
- August 30 – Jean-Louis Calandrini, Genevan scientist (d. 1758)
- September 1 – Just Fabritius, Danish merchant (d. 1766)
- September 3 – Johann Theodor of Bavaria, cardinal (d. 1763)
- September 6 – John Harris, British landowner and politician (d. 1768)
- September 15 – Guillaume-François Rouelle, French chemist (d. 1770)
- September 23 – Charlotte Howe, Viscountess Howe, Hanover-born British courtier and politician (d. 1782)
- September 29
  - François Boucher, French painter (d. 1770)
  - Baltzer Fleischer, Norwegian civil servant and county governor (d. 1767)
  - François Fresneau de La Gataudière, French botanist and scientist (d. 1770)
  - Philip Syng, Irish-born American silversmith (d. 1789)
- October 3 – Franz Christoph Janneck, Austrian painter in the Baroque style (d. 1761)
- October 5 – Jonathan Edwards, North American revivalist preacher (d. 1758)
- October 6 – Louis de Beaufort, French-Dutch historian known for his critical approach to the history of Rome (d. 1795)
- October 7 – Frederick, Hereditary Prince of Baden-Durlach, German hereditary prince (d. 1732)
- October 13
  - Andrea Belli, Maltese architect and businessman (d. 1772)
  - Otto Thott, Danish Count (d. 1785)
- October 15 – Benigna Gottliebe von Trotta genannt Treyden, Duchess consort of Courland (d. 1782)
- October 16
  - Joachim Faiguet de Villeneuve, French economist (d. 1781)
  - Henry Fane of Wormsley, English politician (d. 1777)
- October 22 – Edward Rudge, English politician (d. 1763)
- October 23 – Sir Alexander Dick, 3rd Baronet, Scottish landowner and physician (d. 1785)
- October 28
  - Andreas Bjørn, Danish merchant (d. 1750)
  - Antoine Deparcieux, French mathematician (d. 1768
- October 30 – James Hill, Scottish surgeon, advocate of curative excision for cancer (d. 1776)
- November 1 – Frederik Danneskiold-Samsøe, Danish politician (d. 1770)
- November 10 – Carlo Zuccari, Italian composer and violinist (d. 1792)
- November 17 – Adam Miller, German-born pioneer in the colony of Virginia (d. 1783)
- November 18 – Andrew Rollo, 5th Lord Rollo, Scottish army commander in Canada and Dominica during the Seven Years' War (d. 1765)
- November 22
  - Walter Pompe, Flemish master-sculptor (d. 1777)
  - Balthasar Riepp, German-Austrian painter (d. 1764)
- November 23 – Louise Levesque, French femme de lettres (d. 1743)
- November 25 – Jean-François Séguier, French astronomer and botanist (d. 1784)
- November 26 – Theophilus Cibber, English actor and writer (d. 1758)
- November 27 – James De Lancey, colonial governor of the Province of New York (d. 1760)
- December 2 – Ferdinand Konščak, Croatian Jesuit missionary, explorer and cartographer (d. 1759)
- December 9 – Chester Moore Hall, British lawyer and inventor who produced the first achromatic lenses (d. 1771)
- December 12 – Simon Carl Stanley, Danish sculptor of English parentage (d. 1761)
- December 15
  - Johann Martin Boltzius, German born (d. 1765)
  - Frederick Ernest of Brandenburg-Kulmbach, member of the Brandenburg-Kulmbach branch of the House of Hohenzollern (d. 1762)
- December 23 – Stephen Cornwallis, career British Army officer and politician (d. 1743)
- December 24
  - Aleksei Chirikov, Russian navigator (d. 1748)
  - Christen Lindencrone, Danish landowner and supercargo of the Danish Asia Company (d. 1772)
- Johann Gottlieb Graun, German Baroque/Classical era composer and violinist (d. 1771)
- Muhammad ibn Abd al-Wahhab, Saudi Sunni scholar, theologian, preacher, activist, and religious leader (d. 1792)

1704

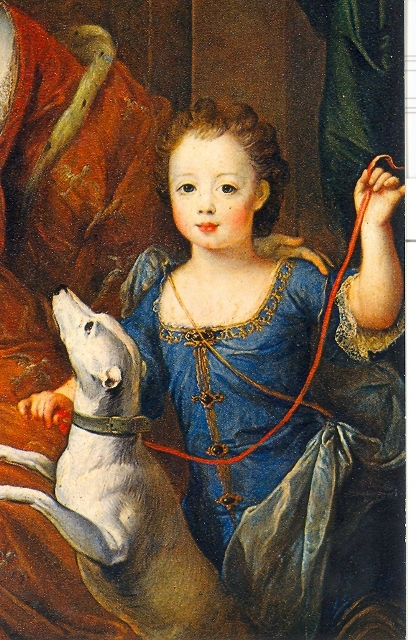
Louis, Hereditary Prince of Lorraine born 28 January

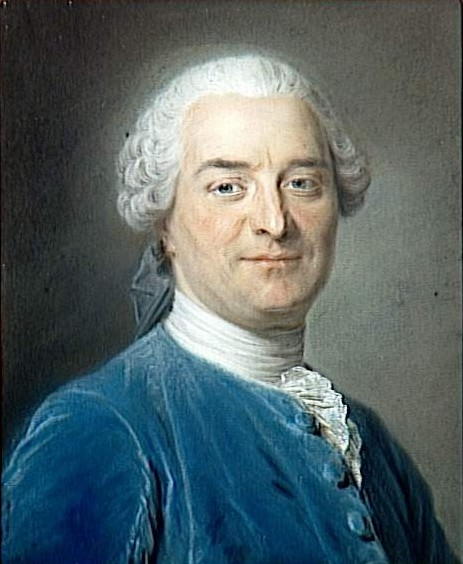
Charles Pinot Duclos born 12 February

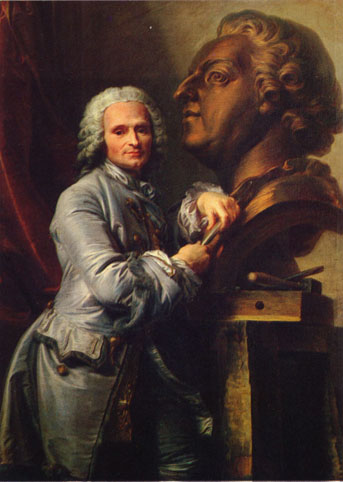
Jean-Baptiste Lemoyne born 15 February

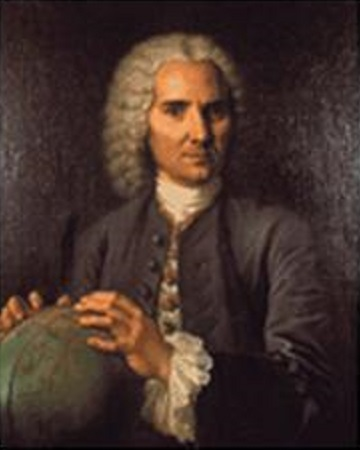
Louis Godin born 28 February

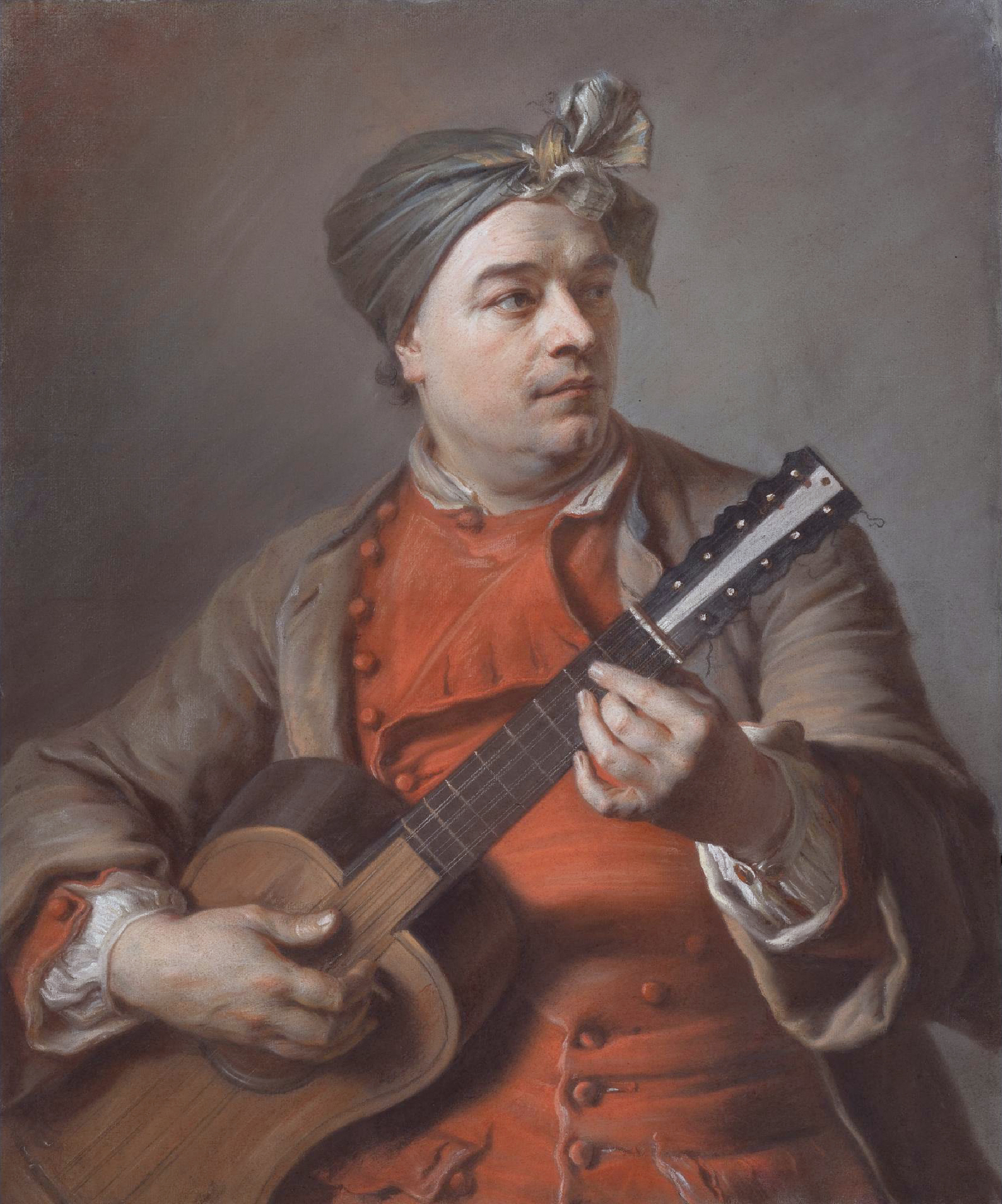
Jacques Dumont le Romain born 10 May

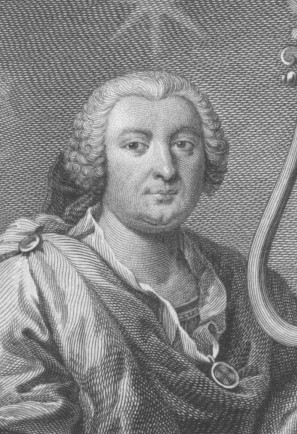
Carlos Seixas born 11 June

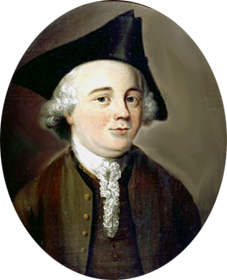
John Kay (flying shuttle) born 17 June

James Gabriel Montresor born 19 November

- January 1
  - Soame Jenyns, English writer and Member of Parliament (d. 1787)
  - Thomas Newton, English cleric (d. 1782)
- January 6 – Michael Becher, Bristol-born English slave trader and merchant (d. 1758)
- January 16 – Finnur Jónsson, Icelandic pastor, Bishop of Skálholt from 1754 to 1785 (d. 1789)
- January 28 – Louis, Hereditary Prince of Lorraine (d. 1711)
- January 29 – Francesco Appiani, Italian painter of the late-Baroque period (d. 1792)
- February 4 – Anna Susanne von der Osten, Danish courtier and philanthropist (d. 1773)
- February 5 – Anne Christine of Sulzbach, Princess of Piedmont (d. 1722)
- February 6 – John Mercer, colonial American lawyer (d. 1768)
- February 12
  - Charles Pinot Duclos, French writer (d. 1772)
  - Jan Schreuder, 30th Governor of Zeylan during the Dutch period in Ceylon (d. 1764)
- February 15
  - Aloysius Bellecius, Jesuit ascetic author (d. 1757)
  - Jean-Baptiste Lemoyne, French sculptor who worked in both the rococo and neoclassical style (d. 1778)
- February 17
  - Marie-Madeleine Hachard, French letter writer and abbess of the Ursuline order (d. 1760)
  - Józef Pułaski (d. 1769)
  - Prince John August of Saxe-Gotha-Altenburg, German prince (d. 1767)
- February 24 – Johann Hieronymus Kniphof, German physician and botanist (d. 1763)
- February 28
  - Louis Godin, French astronomer and member of the French Academy of Sciences (d. 1760)
  - Hans Hermann von Katte, Lieutenant of the Prussian Army (d. 1730)
- February 29 – Phillips Payson, American Congregationalist minister for the town of Walpole (d. 1778)
- March 6 – John Ward, 1st Viscount Dudley and Ward (d. 1774)
- March 10 – Josias Lyndon, governor of the Colony of Rhode Island and Providence Plantations (d. 1778)
- March 17 – Lord Charles Cavendish (d. 1783)
- March 21 – Alexander Ferdinand, 3rd Prince of Thurn and Taxis (d. 1773)
- April 1 – Amalie von Wallmoden, Countess of Yarmouth, principal mistress of King George II from the mid-1730s (d. 1765)
- April 4 – Andreas Brünniche, Danish portrait painter (d. 1769)
- April 7 – Guillaume-François Berthier, Jesuit professor and writer (d. 1782)
- April 10 – Benjamin Heath, English classical scholar (d. 1766)
- April 13 – Francis North, 1st Earl of Guilford (d. 1790)
- April 17
  - Paolo Girolamo Besozzi, Italian oboe virtuoso and bassoonist (d. 1778)
  - Jean-Baptiste Chermanne, architect and businessman active in the Southern Netherlands and the Principality of Liège (d. 1770)
- April 21 – Gabriel Manigault, American merchant (d. 1781)
- April 29 – Arthur Denny, Irish politician (d. 1742)
- April 30 – Jean Adam, Scottish poet from the labouring classes (d. 1765)
- May 6 – Fath Muhammad, general of Mysore and the father of Hyder Ali (d. 1725)
- May 7 – Carl Heinrich Graun, German composer and tenor (d. 1759)
- May 8 – Gaspare Testone, Italian painter and architect (d. 1801)
- May 10 – Jacques Dumont le Romain, French history and portrait painter (d. 1781)
- June 1 – Johann Baptist Straub (d. 1784)
- June 4 – Benjamin Huntsman, English inventor and manufacturer of cast or crucible steel (d. 1776)
- June 11 – Carlos Seixas, Portuguese composer (d. 1742)
- June 16 – Edward Ward, 9th Baron Dudley (d. 1731)
- June 17 – John Kay, inventor of the flying shuttle (d. 1780)
- June 22 – John Taylor, English classical scholar (d. 1766)
- June 24
  - Jean-Baptiste de Boyer, Marquis d'Argens, French writer (d. 1771)
  - John Ward, English actor and theatre manager (d. 1773)
- June 29 – Azad Bilgrami, scholar of Arabic (d. 1786)
- July 4 – Michel de Sallaberry (d. 1768)
- July 15 – August Gottlieb Spangenberg, German theologian and minister (d. 1792)
- July 31 – Gabriel Cramer, Swiss mathematician (d. 1752)
- August 3
  - Catherine-Nicole Lemaure, French operatic soprano (d. 1786)
  - Benjamin Shoemaker, colonial Pennsylvania Quaker (d. 1767)
- August 5 – William Allen, wealthy merchant (d. 1780)
- August 11 – Karl August von Bergen (d. 1759)
- August 12 – Countess Caroline of Nassau-Saarbrücken (d. 1774)
- August 13 – Alexis Fontaine des Bertins, French mathematician (d. 1771)
- August 21 – Johann Georg, Chevalier de Saxe (d. 1774)
- August 26
  - Marie-Anne Barbel, French-Canadian Businesswomen who lived in New France (d. 1793)
  - Guy Michel de Durfort, French general and nobleman (d. 1773)
  - Pierre L'Enfant, painter (d. 1787)
- September 3 – Joseph de Jussieu, French botanist and explorer (d. 1779)
- September 5 – Maurice Quentin de La Tour, French Rococo portraitist, working primarily with pastels (d. 1788)
- September 7 – John Hope, 2nd Earl of Hopetoun, son of Charles Hope (d. 1781)
- September 12 – Stephen Fox-Strangways, 1st Earl of Ilchester (d. 1776)
- September 20 – Isaac Basire, engraver, first in a family line of prolific and well-respected engravers (d. 1768)
- September 22 – Jacques de Lafontaine de Belcour, French entrepreneur with business ventures in New France (now Quebec) (d. 1765)
- September 24 – Karl August, Prince of Waldeck and Pyrmont (d. 1763)
- September 26 – William French, Anglican priest (d. 1785)
- September 29 – Johann Friedrich Cartheuser, German physician and naturalist (d. 1777)
- October 29 – John Byng, British admiral (d. 1757)
- November 1
  - Erland Broman, Swedish official and noble (d. 1757)
  - Paul Daniel Longolius, German encyclopedist (d. 1779)
- November 5
  - Benjamin Goldthwait, British army officer in King George's War and the French and Indian War (d. 1761)
  - Samuel Pegge, English antiquary and clergyman (d. 1796)
- November 6 – Willem Bentinck van Rhoon, Dutch nobleman and politician (d. 1774)
- November 7 – Charles Gautier de Vinfrais, French officer of the Royal venery (d. 1797)
- November 11 – Adriaan van Royen, Dutch botanist (d. 1779)
- November 13 – Charles Hamilton, MP (d. 1786)
- November 16 – Giacopo Belgrado (d. 1789)
- November 19
  - James Gabriel Montresor, British military engineer (d. 1776)
  - Richard Pococke (d. 1765)
- November 28 – Jacob Mossel (d. 1761)
- December 8 – Anton de Haen, Austrian physician of Dutch ancestry (d. 1776)
- December 12
  - Peter Kemble, American politician from the colonial period, President of the New Jersey Provincial Council from 1745 to 1776 (d. 1789)
  - Sir Edward Knatchbull, 7th Baronet (d. 1789)
- December 14 – Jacob von Eggers, Military engineer (d. 1773)
- December 26 – Lord George Beauclerk, British Army officer (d. 1768)
- December 29 – Martha Daniell Logan, American botanist (d. 1779)
- December 31 – Carl Gotthelf Gerlach, German organist (d. 1761)

1705

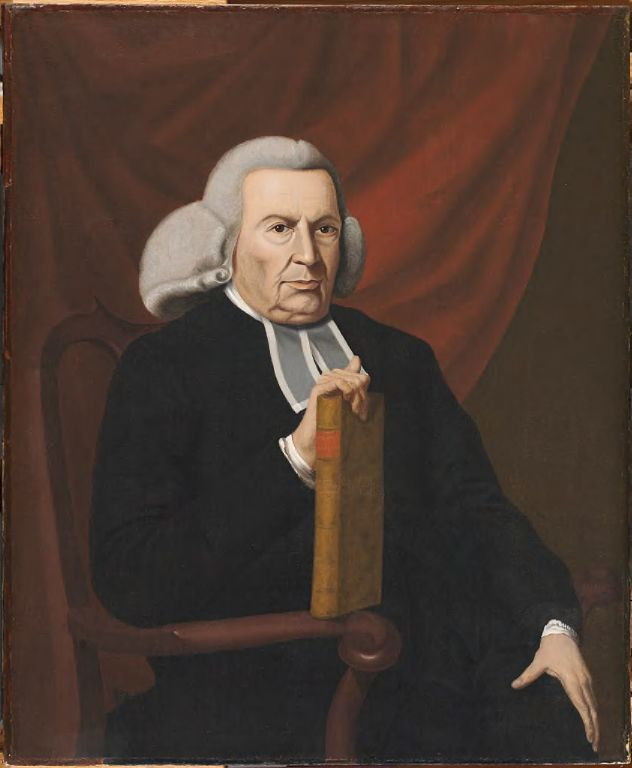
Charles Chauncy (1705–1787) born 1 January

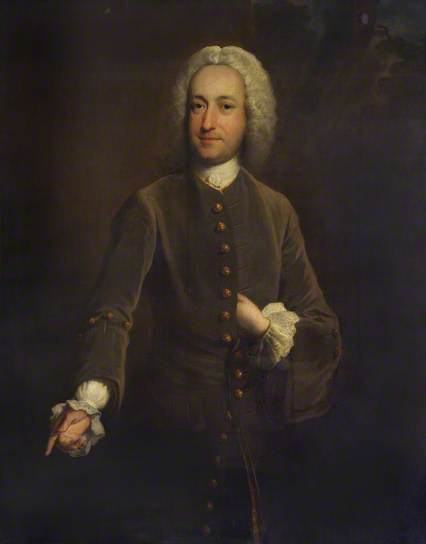
Isaac Hawkins Browne (poet) born 21 January

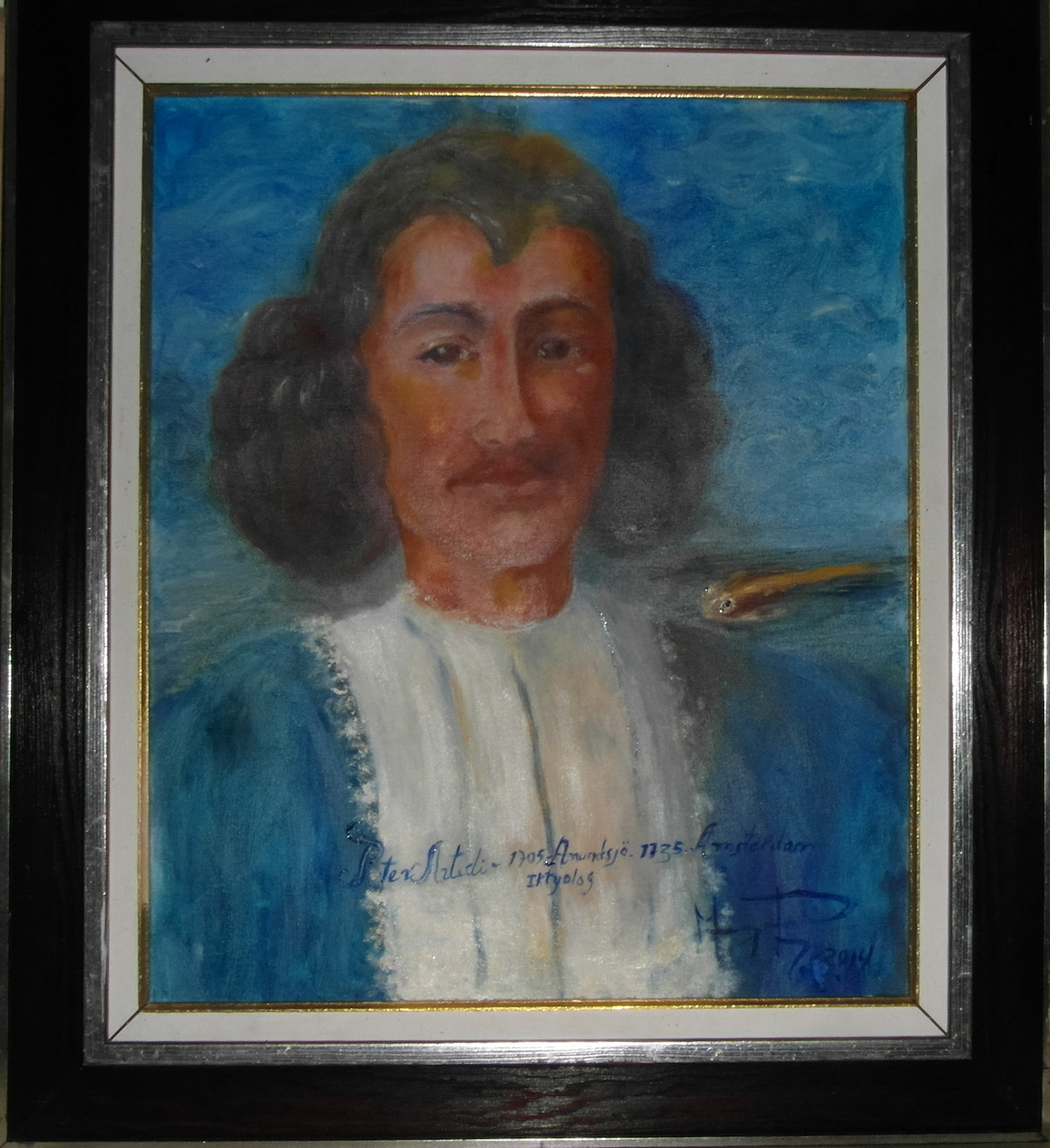
Peter Artedi born 27 February

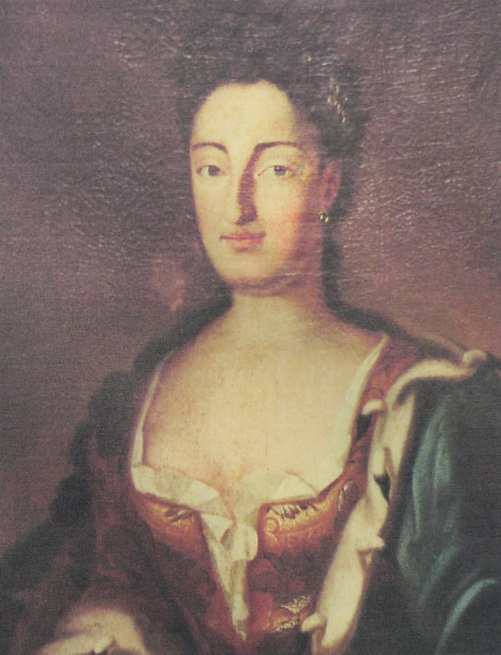
Sophie Caroline of Brandenburg-Kulmbach born 31 March

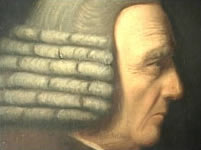
William Cookworthy born 12 April

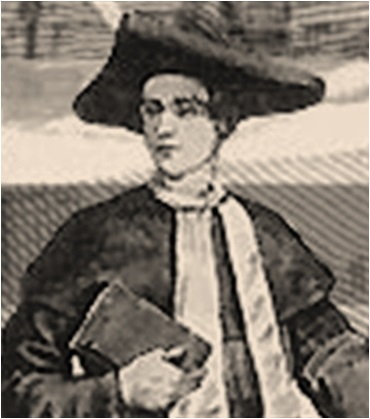
António José da Silva born 8 May

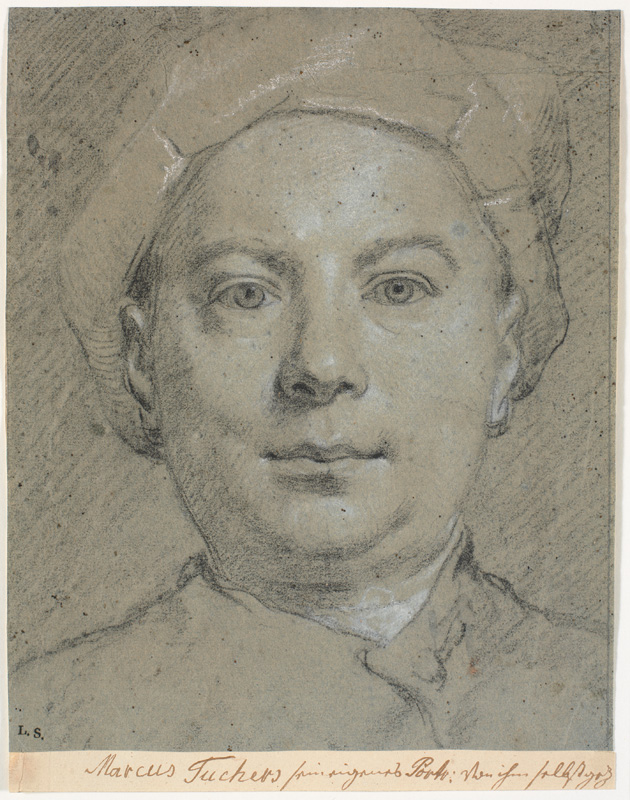
Carl Marcus Tuscher born 1 June

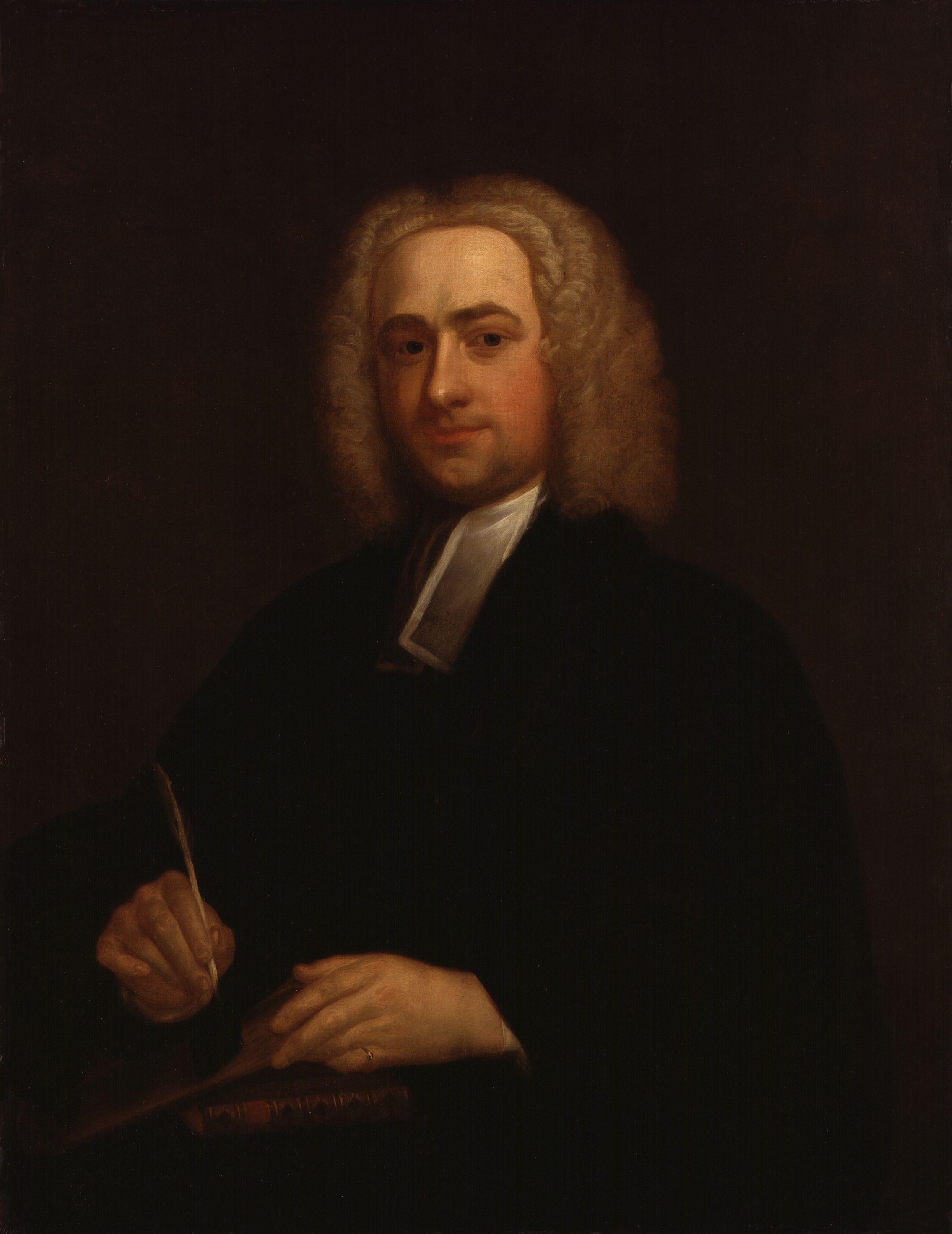
Thomas Birch born 23 November

- January 1 – Charles Chauncy, American Congregational clergyman (d. 1787)
- January 5 – John Stanhope, English Member of Parliament (d. 1748)
- January 8 – Jacques-François Blondel, French architect and teacher (d. 1774)
- January 14 – Jean-Baptiste Charles Bouvet de Lozier, French governor of the Mascarene Islands (d. 1786)
- January 15 – Ludwig Gruno of Hesse-Homburg (d. 1745)
- January 21 – Isaac Hawkins Browne, English poet (d. 1760)
- January 24 – Farinelli, Italian castrato (d. 1782)
- January 28 – Reverend Joseph Fish, pastor in the British North American colonies (d. 1781)
- February 3 – John Robinson, politician, landowner in the British colony of Virginia (d. 1766)
- February 13 – Franciszka Urszula Radziwiłłowa, Polish writer and playwright (d. 1753)
- February 15 – Charles-André van Loo, French painter (d. 1765)
- February 20 – Nicolas Chédeville, French composer (d. 1782)
- February 21 – Edward Hawke, 1st Baron Hawke, British Royal Navy admiral (d. 1781)
- February 24 – Hieronymus David Gaubius, German physician and chemist (d. 1780)
- February 25 – Edward Ironside, British banker, Lord Mayor of London in 1753 (d. 1753)
- February 27 – Peter Artedi, Swedish naturalist, known as the "father of ichthyology" (d. 1735)
- March 2 – William Murray, 1st Earl of Mansfield, Scottish judge and politician (d. 1793)
- March 8 – Margrethe Marie Thomasine Numsen, Danish courtier (d. 1776)
- March 9 – Tommaso Temanza, Italian architect and author of the Neoclassic period (d. 1789)
- March 12 – Noël Jourda de Vaux, French noble and general (d. 1788)
- March 18 – Jeremias Van Rensselaer, 6th patroon of Rensselaerwyck, eldest son of Kiliaen van Rensselaer and Maria van Cortlandt (d. 1743)
- March 20 – Johann Sigismund Scholze, Silesian music anthologist and poet (d. 1750)
- March 21 – Lorenz Natter, German gem-engraver and medallist (d. 1763)
- March 22 – Nicolas-Sébastien Adam, French sculptor (d. 1778)
- March 30 – August Johann Rösel von Rosenhof, German miniature painter (d. 1759)
- March 31 – Sophie Caroline of Brandenburg-Kulmbach, princess consort of Ostfriesland as the spouse of Prince George Albert (d. 1764)
- April 7 – Sir Edward O'Brien, 2nd Baronet (d. 1765)
- April 9 – Nathan Webb (d. 1772)
- April 12 – William Cookworthy, English Quaker minister (d. 1780)
- April 19 – Claes Grill, Swedish merchant (d. 1767)
- April 21 – Jean-Pierre Aulneau, Jesuit missionary priest, briefly active in New France (d. 1736)
- April 23 – Erasmus James Philipps, serving member on Nova Scotia Council (1730–1760) (d. 1760)
- May 1 – Nathaniel Elliot, English Jesuit scholar (d. 1780)
- May 5 – John Campbell, 4th Earl of Loudoun, Scottish nobleman and army officer (d. 1782)
- May 6 – Christian Gärtner, German telescope maker and astronomer (d. 1782)
- May 8 – António José da Silva, Portuguese dramatist born in colonial Brazil (d. 1739)
- May 10 – Alexander Luttrell (d. 1737)
- May 13 – Johan Lorentz Castenschiold, Dutch-Danish landowner who was ennobled (d. 1747)
- June 1 – Carl Marcus Tuscher, German-born Danish polymath (d. 1751)
- June 9
  - Jan Paweł Biretowski (d. 1781)
  - Francis Blackburne, English Anglican churchman and activist (d. 1787)
- June 10 – Charles Frederick Albert, Margrave of Brandenburg-Schwedt (d. 1762)
- June 21 – Samuel Edwards, American silversmith (d. 1762)
- July 1 – Sir Alexander Grant, 5th Baronet (d. 1772)
- July 23 – Francis Blomefield, English antiquarian (d. 1752)
- August 8 – Gustaaf Willem van Imhoff, Dutch colonial administrator for the Dutch East India Company (VOC) (d. 1750)
- August 12 – Jonathan Clarke, American silversmith active in Newport (d. 1770)
- August 15 – Joseph Wanton, merchant, governor of the Colony of Rhode Island and Providence Plantations (d. 1780)
- August 18
  - Emanuel Büchel, Swiss painter (d. 1775)
  - Louis Phélypeaux, comte de Saint-Florentin (d. 1777)
- August 20
  - James Balfour, philosopher (d. 1795)
  - Henry Bromley, 1st Baron Montfort (d. 1755)
- August 30 – David Hartley, English philosopher (d. 1757)
- September 2 – Abraham Tucker, English country gentleman (d. 1774)
- September 5 – Élisabeth Alexandrine de Bourbon, French princess of the blood (d. 1765)
- September 7 – Matthäus Günther, German painter and artist of the Baroque and Rococo era (d. 1788)
- September 19
  - Marguerite-Antoinette Couperin, French harpsichordist (d. 1778)
  - William Craven, 5th Baron Craven, English nobleman and Member of Parliament (d. 1769)
- September 21 (bapt.) – Dick Turpin, English thief and highwayman (hanged 1739)
- September 23 – Joseph, Hereditary Prince of Hesse-Rotenburg (d. 1744)
- September 24 – Leopold Josef Graf Daun, Austrian field marshal (d. 1766)
- September 28
  - Henry Fox, 1st Baron Holland, English statesman (d. 1774)
  - Johann Peter Kellner, German organist and composer (d. 1772)
- October 3 – Jacques-Joachim Trotti, marquis de La Chétardie, French diplomat who engineered the coup d'état that brought Elizaveta Petrovna to the Russian throne in 1741 (d. 1759)
- October 8 – Yakov Shakhovskoy (d. 1777)
- October 12 – Emmanuel Héré de Corny, court architect to Stanisław Leszczyński (d. 1763)
- October 23 – Maximilian Ulysses Browne, Austrian military officer (d. 1757)
- October 25 – Johann Friedrich Endersch, German cartographer and mathematician (d. 1769)
- October 31 – Pope Clement XIV (d. 1774)
- November 1 – Antoine Terrasson, French author (d. 1782)
- November 4 – Louis-Élisabeth de La Vergne de Tressan, French soldier (d. 1783)
- November 5
  - William Baker, English merchant and politician (d. 1770)
  - Louis-Gabriel Guillemain, French composer and violinist (d. 1770)
- November 15 – Sir Halswell Tynte, 3rd Baronet (d. 1730)
- November 17 – Andrea Casali (d. 1784)
- November 23 – Thomas Birch, English historian (d. 1766)
- November 24 – Christian Moritz Graf Königsegg und Rothenfels (d. 1778)
- November 29 – Michael Christian Festing, English violinist and composer (d. 1752)
- November 30 – Jonathan Parsons, Christian New England clergyman during the late colonial period, supporter of the American Revolution (d. 1776)
- December 6 – Andrés de la Calleja, Spanish painter (d. 1785)
- December 9 – Faustina Pignatelli, Italian mathematician (d. 1769)
- December 14
  - Wiguläus von Kreittmayr, Bavarian jurist and public official (d. 1790)
  - Queen Seonui, wife and Queen Consort of King Gyeongjong of Joseon (d. 1730)
- December 20
  - George Fothergill (d. 1760)
  - Antonio Palomba, Italian opera librettist (d. 1769)
- December 27 – Prince Frederick Henry Eugen of Anhalt-Dessau, German prince of the House of Ascania (d. 1781)
- December 30 – Georg Wolfgang Knorr, German engraver and naturalist (d. 1761)

1706

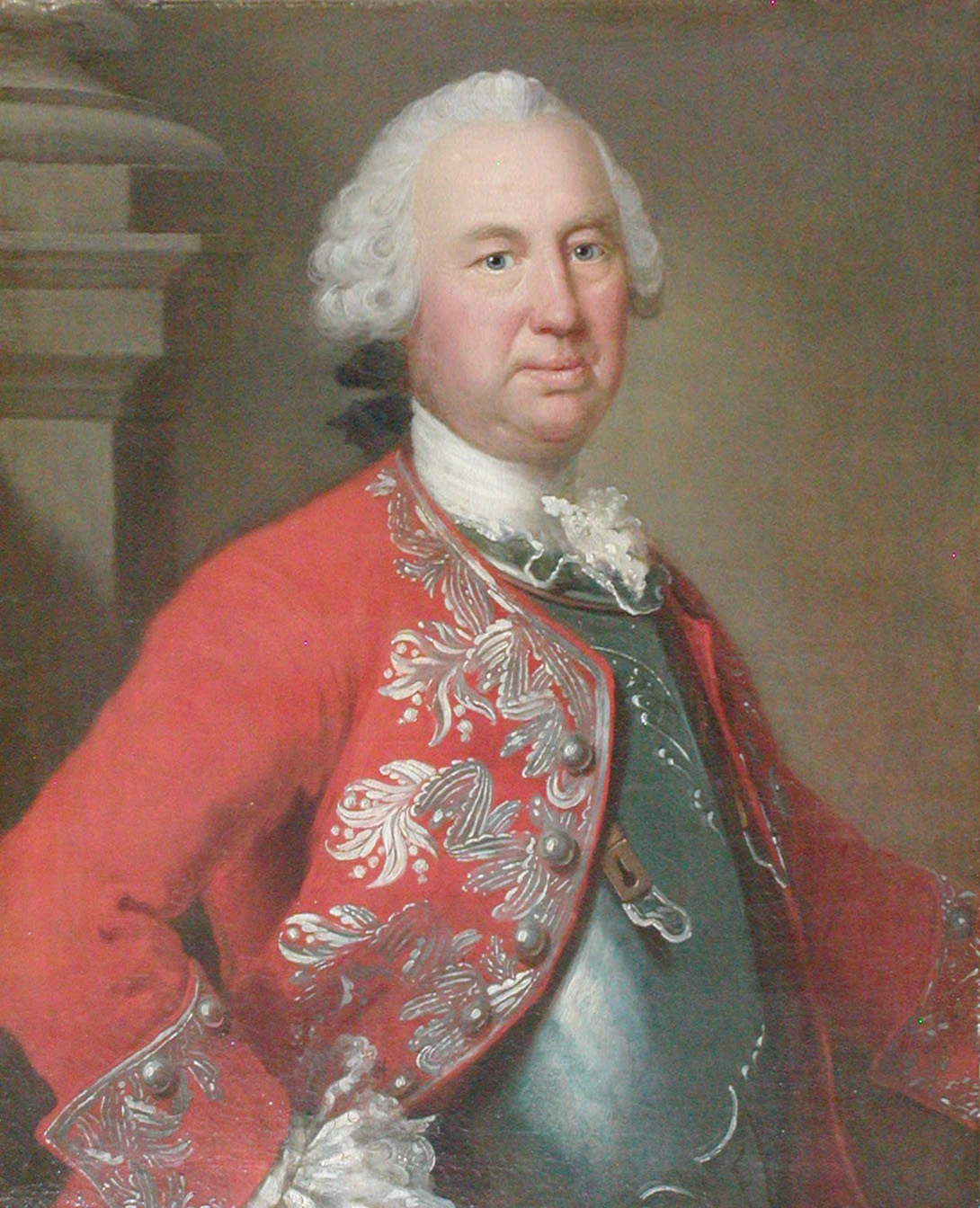
Lauritz de Thurah born 4 March

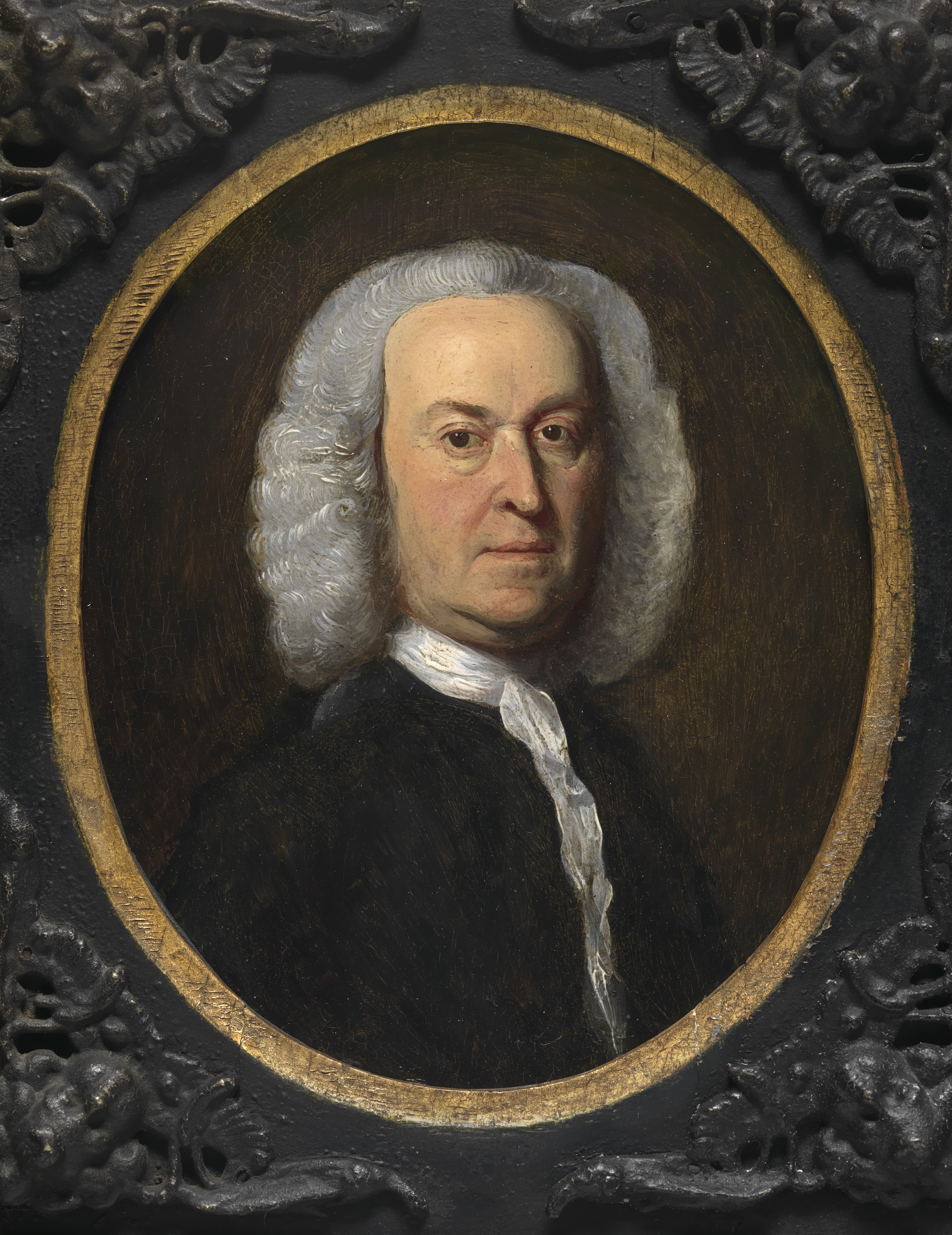
Andrew Oliver born 28 March

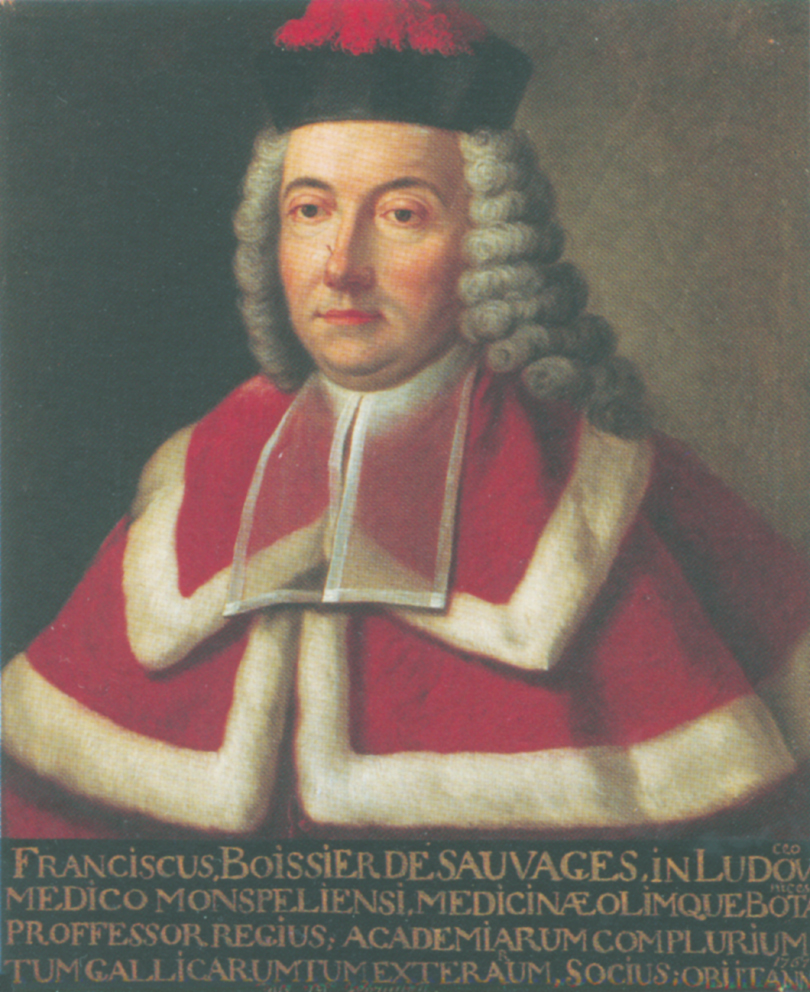
François Boissier de Sauvages de Lacroix born 12 May

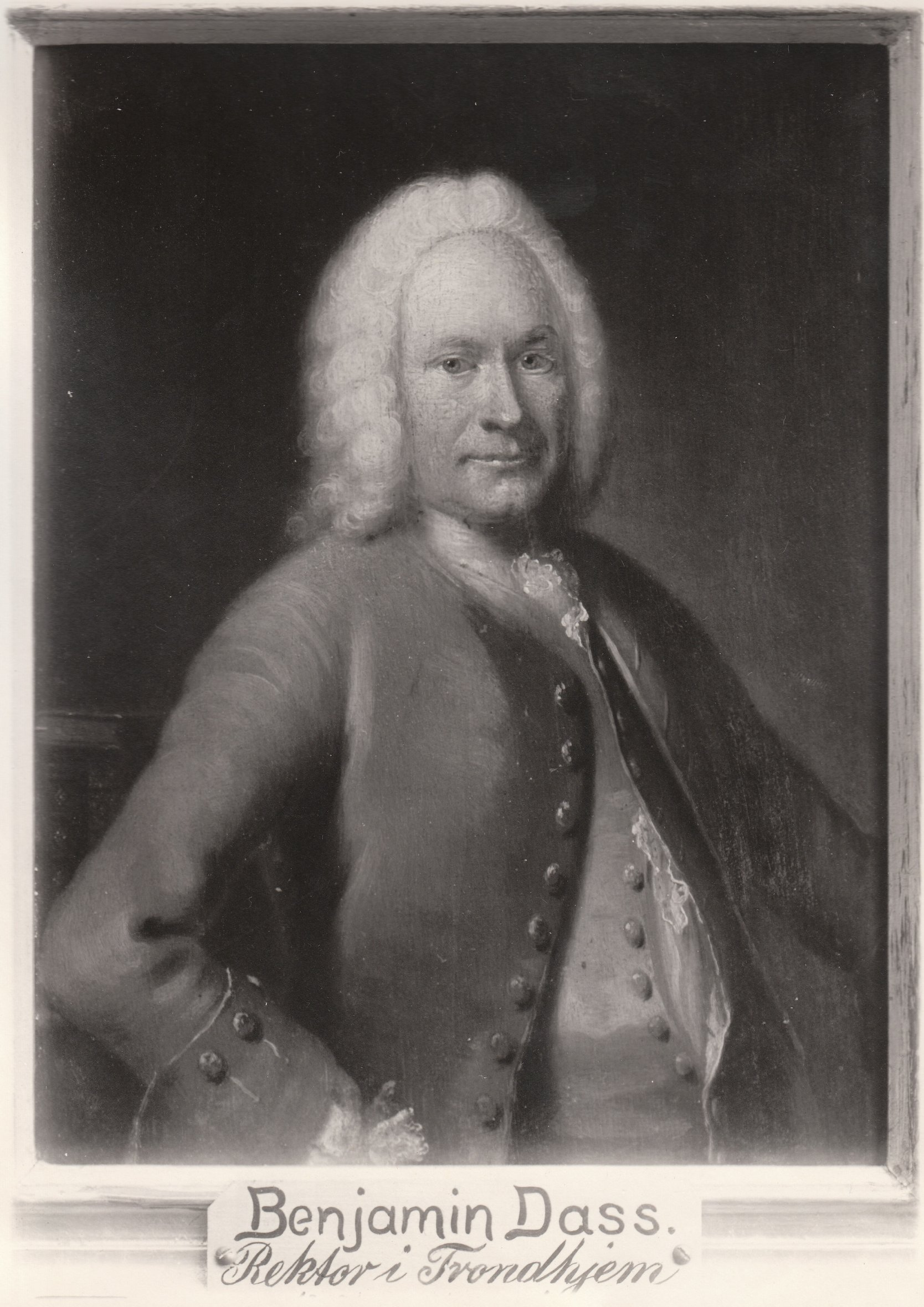
Benjamin Dass born 15 August

- January 1
  - Henry Howard, 10th Earl of Suffolk (d. 1745)
  - Nils Wallerius, Swedish physicist (d. 1764)
- January 3 – Johann Caspar Füssli, Swiss portrait painter and writer (d. 1782)
- January 7 – Johann Heinrich Zedler, German publisher (d. 1751)
- January 17
  - Benjamin Franklin, American inventor and Founding Father (d. 1790)
  - George Michael Moser, Swiss artist and enameller (d. 1783)
  - Richard Penn Sr., proprietary and titular governor of Pennsylvania and the counties of New Castle County (d. 1771)
- January 20 – Frederick Charles Augustus, Count of Lippe (d. 1781)
- January 26 – John Elder, American colonial pastor (d. 1792)
- January 28 – Shubal Stearns, American colonial evangelist and preacher during the Great Awakening (d. 1771)
- February 2 – Claude-Godefroy Coquart, Jesuit priest who probably arrived in Quebec in 1739 (d. 1765)
- February 8 – Luis de Córdova y Córdova, Spanish admiral (d. 1796)
- February 11 – Nils Rosén von Rosenstein, Swedish physician (d. 1773)
- February 12 – Johann Joseph Christian, German Baroque sculptor and woodcarver (d. 1777)
- February 17 – Robert Hampden-Trevor, 1st Viscount Hampden, British diplomat at The Hague and then joint Postmaster General (d. 1783)
- February 19 – John Hornyold, English Catholic bishop (d. 1778)
- February 20 – Phineas Stevens, distinguished officer noted for his defense of the Fort at Number 4 during a siege in April 1747 (d. 1756)
- February 26 – Jan Antonín Vocásek, Czech Baroque painter (d. 1757)
- February 28 – Philippe-François Bart, French naval officer who was Governor of Saint-Domingue during the Seven Years' War (d. 1784)
- March 1 – Sébastien Bigot de Morogues, French soldier, a sailor and military naval tactician (d. 1781)
- March 4 – Lauritz de Thurah, Danish architect and architectural writer (d. 1759)
- March 6 – Sir George Pocock, British admiral (d. 1792)
- March 7 – Johann Leonhard Dober, one of the two first missionaries of the Moravian Brethren in the West Indies in 1732 (d. 1766)
- March 12 – Johan Pasch, Swedish painter (d. 1769)
- March 13 – Johann Christoph Heilbronner, German mathematical historian (d. 1745)
- March 14 – Siegmund Jakob Baumgarten, German Protestant theologian (d. 1757)
- March 23 – Anna Maria Barbara Abesch, Swiss reverse glass painter and the daughter of Johann Peter Abesch (d. 1773)
- March 26 – Mather Byles, American clergyman active in British North America (d. 1788)
- March 28 – Andrew Oliver, merchant and public official in the province of Massachusetts Bay (d. 1774)
- March 30 – Tommaso Struzzieri, Roman Catholic prelate who served as Bishop of Todi (1775–1780) (d. 1780)
- April 2 – Johann Joseph Würth, Austrian silversmith of the late baroque period (d. 1767)
- April 6 – Louis de Cahusac, French playwright and librettist (d. 1759)
- April 18 – William Brattle, Attorney General of province of Massachusetts Bay as well as a physician (d. 1776)
- April 24 – Giovanni Battista Martini, Italian musician (d. 1784)
- April 29 – Pierre-Antoine Gourgaud, French actor (d. 1774)
- April 30 – Philipp Jakob Straub, Austrian sculptor (d. 1774)
- May 12 – François Boissier de Sauvages de Lacroix, French physician and botanist who was a native of Alès (d. 1767)
- May 17 – Andreas Felix von Oefele, German historian and librarian (d. 1780)
- May 20 – Seth Pomeroy, American gunsmith and soldier from Northampton (d. 1777)
- May 22 – Samuel Troilius, Archbishop of Uppsala in the Church of Sweden (d. 1764)
- June 10 – John Dollond, English optician (d. 1761)
- June 15 – Johann Joachim Kändler, German sculptor and important modeller of the Meissen porcelain manufactury (d. 1775)
- July 3 – Robert Lee, 4th Earl of Lichfield, English politician and peer (d. 1776)
- July 8 – John Hart, militia officer during King George's War and the French and Indian War (d. 1777)
- July 16 – Charles Godefroy de La Tour d'Auvergne, French nobleman (d. 1771)
- July 21 – Pierre Lyonnet, artist and engraver who became a naturalist (d. 1789)
- August 1 – Franz Sebald Unterberger, South Tyrolean painter in the Baroque style (d. 1776)
- August 4 – Frederick Charles, Duke of Schleswig-Holstein-Sonderburg-Plön (d. 1761)
- August 8 – Johan Augustin Mannerheim, Swedish nobleman and military leader (d. 1778)
- August 11 – Princess Marie Auguste of Thurn and Taxis, Regent of Württemberg (d. 1756)
- August 15 – Benjamin Dass, Norwegian educator and scholar who served as Rector of Trondheim Cathedral School (d. 1775)
- August 16 – Bakht Singh of Marwar, Indian Raja of the Rathore Clan (d. 1752)
- August 21 – Pierre Nicolas d'Incarville, French Jesuit, amateur botanist and missionary to China (d. 1757)
- August 24 – Sir John Evelyn, 2nd Baronet, British courtier and Whig politician (d. 1767)
- August 28 – Jan Bouman, Dutch architect (d. 1776)
- September 3 – Alonso Verdugo, 3rd Count of Torrepalma, Spanish count (d. 1767)
- September 8 – Antoine de Favray, French painter noted for his portraits of personalities of the Ottoman Empire (d. 1798)
- September 9 – Jean-Baptiste Barsalou, Canadian fur trader (d. 1776)
- September 12 – Léon Ménard, French lawyer and historian (d. 1767)
- September 21 – Polyxena of Hesse-Rotenburg, second wife of Charles Emmanuel III of Sardinia (d. 1735)
- September 22 – Barbara Regina Dietzsch, Bavarian painter and engraver (d. 1783)
- October 6
  - Princess Charlotte Amalie of Denmark, Danish princess (d. 1782)
  - Pieter Steyn, Grand Pensionary of Holland (d. 1772)
- October 11 – Nicolaes Geelvinck, mayor of Amsterdam (d. 1764)
- October 18 – Baldassare Galuppi, Venetian composer (d. 1785)
- November 2 – Francis Godolphin, 2nd Baron Godolphin, British peer and politician (d. 1785)
- November 6
  - Pierre Soubeyran, Swiss engraver (d. 1775)
  - William Tans'ur, English hymn-writer, composer and teacher of music (d. 1783)
- November 7 – Carlo Cecere, Italian composer of operas (d. 1761)
- November 8 – Johann Ulrich von Cramer, German judge and philosopher (d. 1772)
- November 11 – Frederick William II, Prince of Nassau-Siegen, last Prince of Nassau-Siegen from the Calvinist line (d. 1734)
- November 18 – Johann Friedrich Alexander, Prince of Wied, German ruler (d. 1791)
- November 22 – Charles Spencer, 3rd Duke of Marlborough (d. 1758)
- November 25 – Henry Dodwell, British religious controversialist and lawyer (d. 1784)
- December 17 – Émilie du Châtelet, French mathematician and physicist (d. 1749)
- December 23 – John Cornwallis, British politician (d. 1768)
- December 24 – Anna Sophie Charlotte of Brandenburg-Schwedt, German noblewoman and member of the House of Hohenzollern (d. 1751)
- December 25 – Maria Anna of Schwarzenberg, Margravine consort of Baden-Baden and Princess of Schwarzenberg by birth (d. 1755)
- December 31 – Elisabetta Maria Satellico, Italian Roman Catholic professed religious from the Poor Clares who served as her convent's abbess (d. 1745)
- date unknown
  - James Abercrombie, British general (d. 1781)
  - Sabina Aufenwerth, German potter (d. 1782)
  - Barbe de Nettine, politically influential Austrian Netherlands banker (d. 1775)

1707

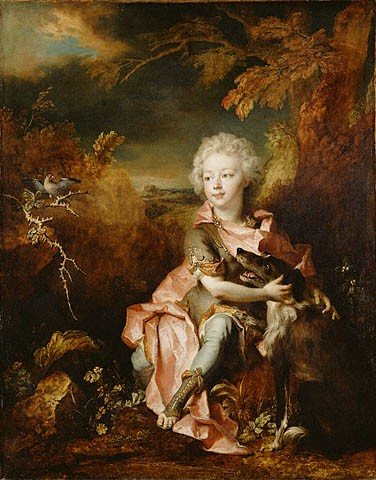
Louis, Duke of Brittany (1707–1712) born 8 January

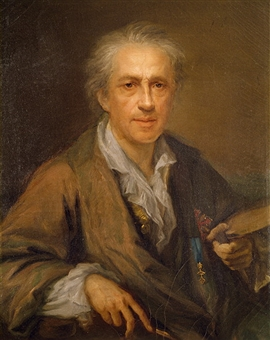
Giuseppe Bonito born 11 January

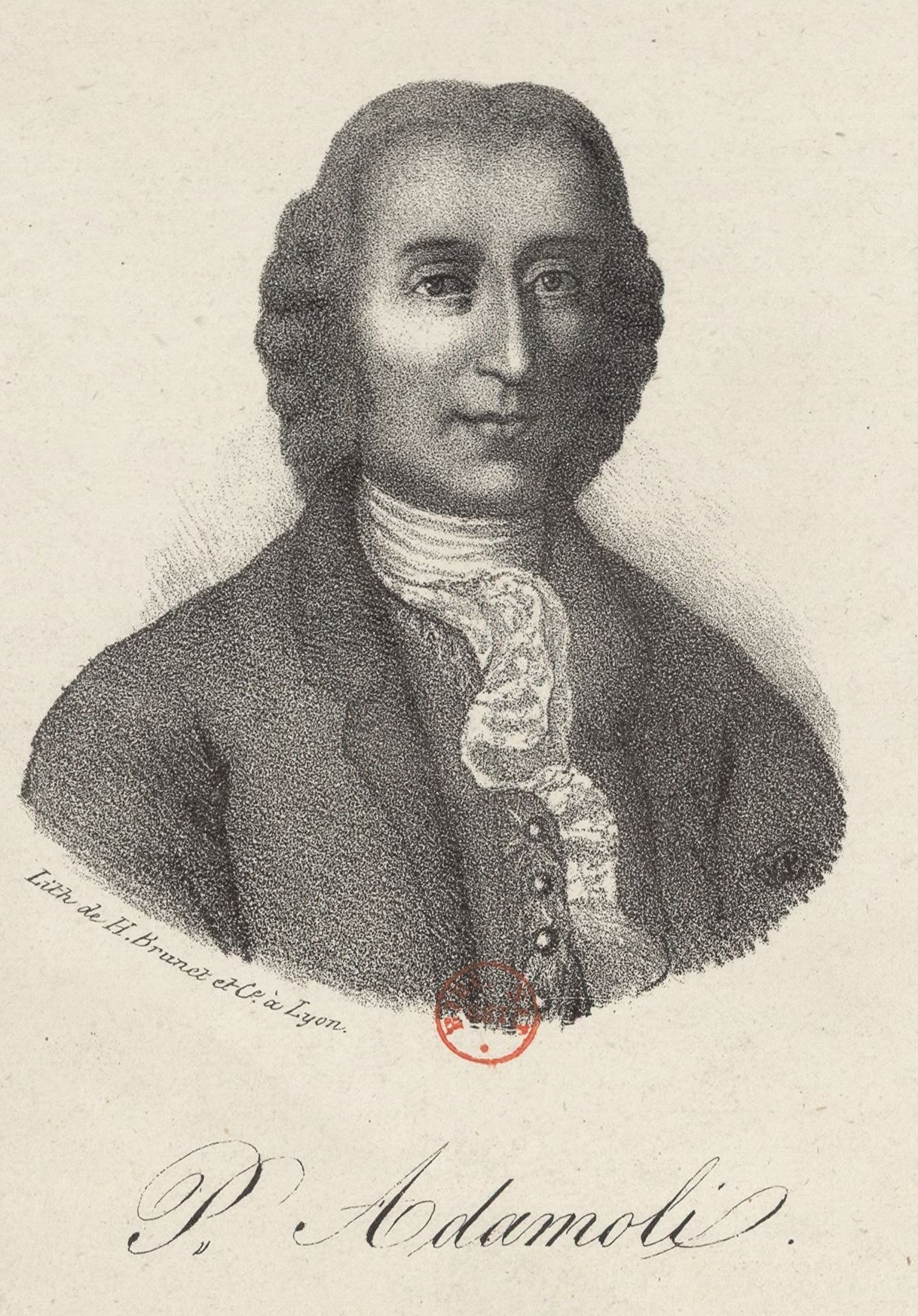
Pierre Adamoli born 5 August

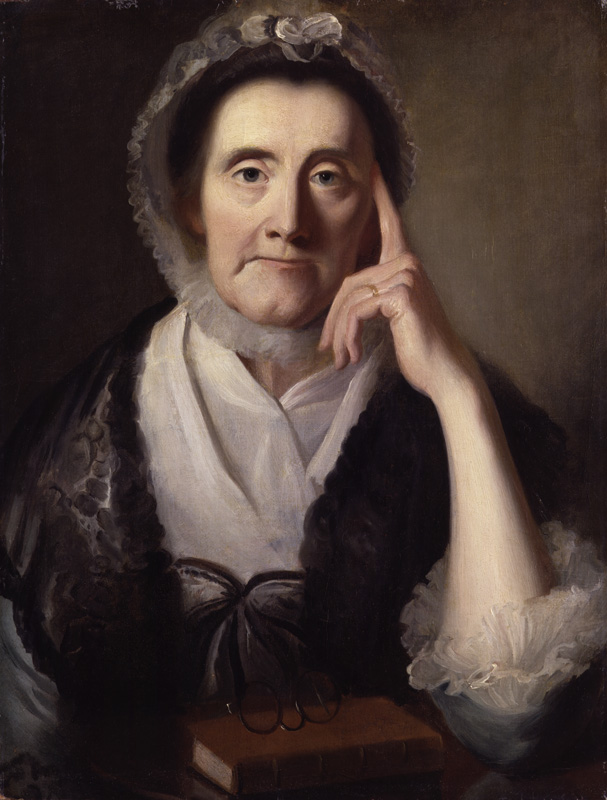
Selina Hastings, Countess of Huntingdon born 24 August

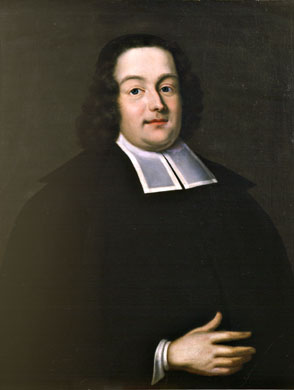
Johannes Browallius born 30 August

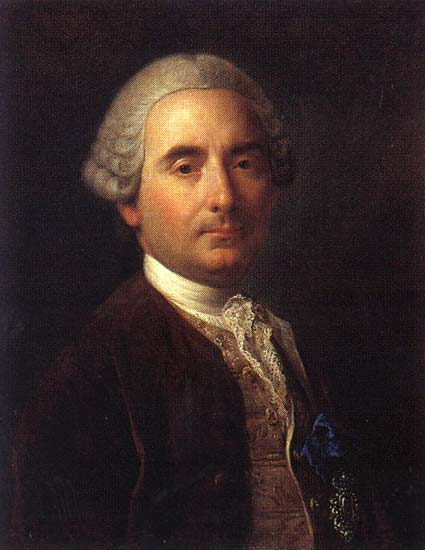
Pietro Rotari born 30 September

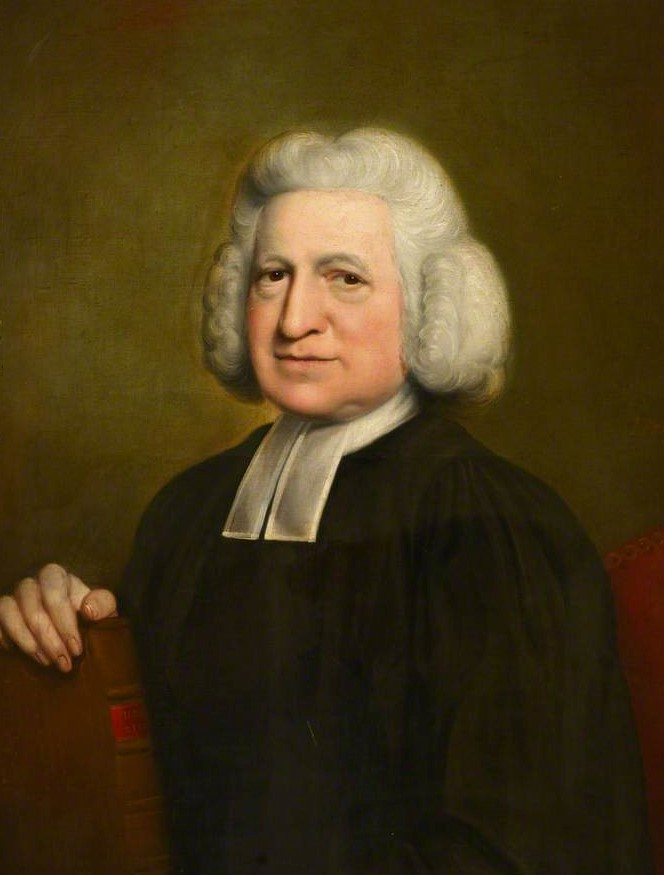
Charles Wesley born 18 December

- January 2 – Johann Adam Lehmus, German poet of numerous spiritual songs (d. 1788)
- January 8 – Louis, Duke of Brittany, second son of Louis of France (d. 1712)
- January 11 – Giuseppe Bonito, Neapolitan painter of the Rococo period (d. 1789)
- January 13 – John Boyle, 5th Earl of Cork, Irish writer (d. 1762)
- January 17 – Prospero Colonna di Sciarra, Italian cardinal of the family of the dukes of Carbognano (d. 1765)
- January 22 – Carl Höckh, German violinist and composer (d. 1773)
- January 26 – Abbé François Blanchet, French littérateur (d. 1784)
- February 1 – Frederick, Prince of Wales (d. 1751)
- February 13
  - Claude Prosper Jolyot de Crébillon, French novelist (d. 1777)
  - Johann William, Count of Erbach-Fürstenau, member of the German House of Erbach who held the fiefs of Fürstenau (d. 1742)
- February 25 – Carlo Goldoni, Italian playwright (d. 1793)
- February 26 – Mariano Arciero, Italian Roman Catholic priest (d. 1788)
- February 27 – Joseph Johann Kauffmann, Austrian painter known for his portraits, church decorations and castle depictions (d. 1782)
- February 28 – Johann Christian Senckenberg, German physician (d. 1772)
- March 1
  - Pierre-Antoine de La Place, French writer and playwright (d. 1793)
  - Jedidiah Preble, Captain of Infantry in Samuel Waldo's Regiment (d. 1784)
- March 2
  - Louis-Michel van Loo, French painter (d. 1771)
  - Guillaume Barthez de Marmorières, French civil engineer (d. 1799)
- March 3 – Johan Ihre, Swedish philologist and historical linguist (d. 1780)
- March 7 – Stephen Hopkins, governor of the Colony of Rhode Island and Providence Plantations (d. 1785)
- March 8
  - William Irby, 1st Baron Boston, British peer and Member of Parliament (d. 1775)
  - Mary Jones, English poet (d. 1778)
- March 20 – Hugh Boscawen, 2nd Viscount Falmouth (d. 1782)
- March 23
  - Stephen van Rensselaer I, second son of Kiliaen van Rensselaer and Maria van Cortlandt (d. 1747)
  - Henry Scudamore, 3rd Duke of Beaufort (d. 1745)
- April 4 – Hans Karl von Winterfeldt, Prussian general (d. 1757)
- April 6 – Abraham de Haen, Dutch draughtsman, engraver, painter and poet (d. 1748)
- April 10
  - Michel Corrette, French composer (d. 1795)
  - Sir John Pringle, 1st Baronet, Scottish physician (d. 1782)
- April 13 – Sir Henry Cavendish, 1st Baronet, British politician who held several appointments in the Kingdom of Ireland (d. 1776)
- April 15
  - Stefano Evodio Assemani, Ottoman-born orientalist, translator, working in the Vatican library (d. 1782)
  - Leonhard Euler, Swiss mathematician and physicist (d. 1783)
  - Claude Louis, Comte de Saint-Germain (d. 1778)
- April 20 – Robert Foulis, Scottish printer and publisher (d. 1776)
- April 22 – Henry Fielding, English novelist and dramatist known for his earthy humour and satire (d. 1754)
- April 25 – Léopold Clément, Hereditary Prince of Lorraine, French prince (d. 1723)
- April 26 – Johannes Burman, Dutch botanist and physician (d. 1780)
- April 28 – Olivier de Vézin, Canadian ironmaster and chief surveyor of Louisiana (d. 1776)
- May 1 – Herbert Windsor, 2nd Viscount Windsor (d. 1758)
- May 2 – Jean-Baptiste Barrière, French cellist and composer (d. 1747)
- May 12 – Francisco Salzillo, Spanish sculptor (d. 1781)
- May 14 – António Teixeira, Portuguese composer (d. 1774)
- May 19 – Robert Hamilton, moderator (d. 1787)
- May 23 – Carl Linnaeus, Swedish botanist (d. 1778)
- May 31 – Pietro De Martino, Italian mathematician and astronomer (d. 1746)
- June 4
  - Benito Fernández de Santa Ana, Franciscan friar, president of the Texas missions of the College of Santa Cruz de Querétaro from 1734 to 1750 (d. 1761)
  - Henning Alexander von Kleist, Prussian Lieutenant-General and Chief of Fusiliers (d. 1784)
- June 15 – Johannes Grubenmann, member of the Swiss family Grubenmann who were famous as carpenters and civil engineers (d. 1771)
- June 18 – Pietro Correr, Italian politician and diplomat (d. 1768)
- June 20 – Louis de Cardevac, marquis d'Havrincourt (d. 1767)
- July 7 – Henry Cunningam, Irish Anglican priest (d. 1777)
- July 8 – Jacques-Philippe Le Bas, French engraver (d. 1783)
- July 10 – Sir William Lowther, 1st Baronet, of Little Preston, English landowner and curate (d. 1788)
- July 17 – Johann Joseph von Trautson, Roman Catholic clergyman (d. 1757)
- July 23 – Edward Bentham, Oxford based theologian who in 1763 (d. 1776)
- August 4 – Johann August Ernesti, German Rationalist theologian and philologist (d. 1781)
- August 5 – Pierre Adamoli, French collector (d. 1769)
- August 7 – Carl Günther Ludovici, German philosopher, lexicographer and economist (d. 1778)
- August 20 – Jacques Roettiers, engraver in England and France (d. 1784)
- August 24 – Selina Hastings, Countess of Huntingdon, English Methodist leader (d. 1791)
- August 25 – King Louis I of Spain (d. 1724)
- August 27 – Zanetta Farussi, Italian comedic actress (d. 1776)
- August 30 – Johannes Browallius, Finnish and Swedish Lutheran theologian, physicist, botanist, friend of Carl Linnaeus (d. 1755)
- September – Nathan Alcock, English physician (d. 1779)
- September 1 – John Salusbury, Welsh nobleman (d. 1762)
- September 2 – Gian Benedetto Mittarelli, Italian monk and monastic historian (d. 1777)
- September 3 – Johann Peter Süssmilch, German Protestant pastor (d. 1767)
- September 5 – John Forbes, British general (d. 1759)
- September 7 – Georges-Louis Leclerc, Comte de Buffon, French scientist (d. 1788)
- September 22 – John Rattray, Edinburgh surgeon who served as surgeon to Prince Charles Edward Stuart (d. 1771)
- September 29 – Antoine Clériadus de Choiseul-Beaupré (d. 1774)
- September 30
  - Pietro Rotari, Italian painter (d. 1762)
  - Richard Trevor, bishop (d. 1771)
- October 4 – Francesco Fontebasso, Italian painter of the late-Baroque or Rococo period of Venice (d. 1769)
- October 6 – Thomas Falkner, English Jesuit missionary (d. 1784)
- October 20 – Thomas Church, British priest and controversialist (d. 1756)
- October 30 – Jeanne Thérèse du Han, Lorraine nobility (d. 1748)
- November 7 – Dieterich Bernhard Ludewig, German organist (d. 1740)
- November 9 – Louis de Pardaillan de Gondrin, French courtier, freemason and great-grandson of Madame de Montespan (d. 1743)
- November 12
  - Emmerich Joseph von Breidbach zu Bürresheim, Archbishop-Elector of Mainz from 1763 to 1774 and Prince-Bishop of Worms from 1768 to 1774 (d. 1774)
  - Joseph du Pont Duvivier, Acadian-born military leader of the French (d. 1760)
- November 15 – Prince Adarnase of Kartli, Georgian prince royal (d. 1784)
- November 23 – Anna Karolina Orzelska, adventuress and Polish szlachcianka (noblewoman) (d. 1769)
- November 28 – Giammaria Mazzucchelli, Italian writer, bibliographer and historian (d. 1765)
- December 2
  - Karl Christoph von der Goltz, lieutenant general in the Prussian army during the reign of Frederick the Great (d. 1761)
  - Johann Julius Hecker, German educator who established the first Realschule and Prussia's first teacher-education institution (d. 1768)
- December 4 – Louise Françoise de Bourbon, Mademoiselle du Maine, granddaughter of Louis XIV of France and his mistress Françoise-Athénaïs (d. 1743)
- December 11 – Paul von Werner, chief of the Prussian Hussar Regiment No. 6 (d. 1785)
- December 17 – Ernest Frederick II, Duke of Saxe-Hildburghausen (d. 1745)
- December 18
  - Walter Calverley-Blackett, British baronet and politician (d. 1777)
  - Charles Wesley, English Methodist leader, brother of John Wesley (d. 1788)
- December 22 – Johann Amman, Swiss-Russian botanist (d. 1741)
- December 25 – Sir Joseph Hoare, 1st Baronet, Anglo-Irish politician (d. 1801)
- date unknown
  - Giuseppe Bonici, Maltese architect and military engineer (d. 1779)
  - Moshe Chaim Luzzatto, Italian rabbi, mystic, and philosopher (d. 1746)
- probable William Hoare, English painter (d. 1792)

1708

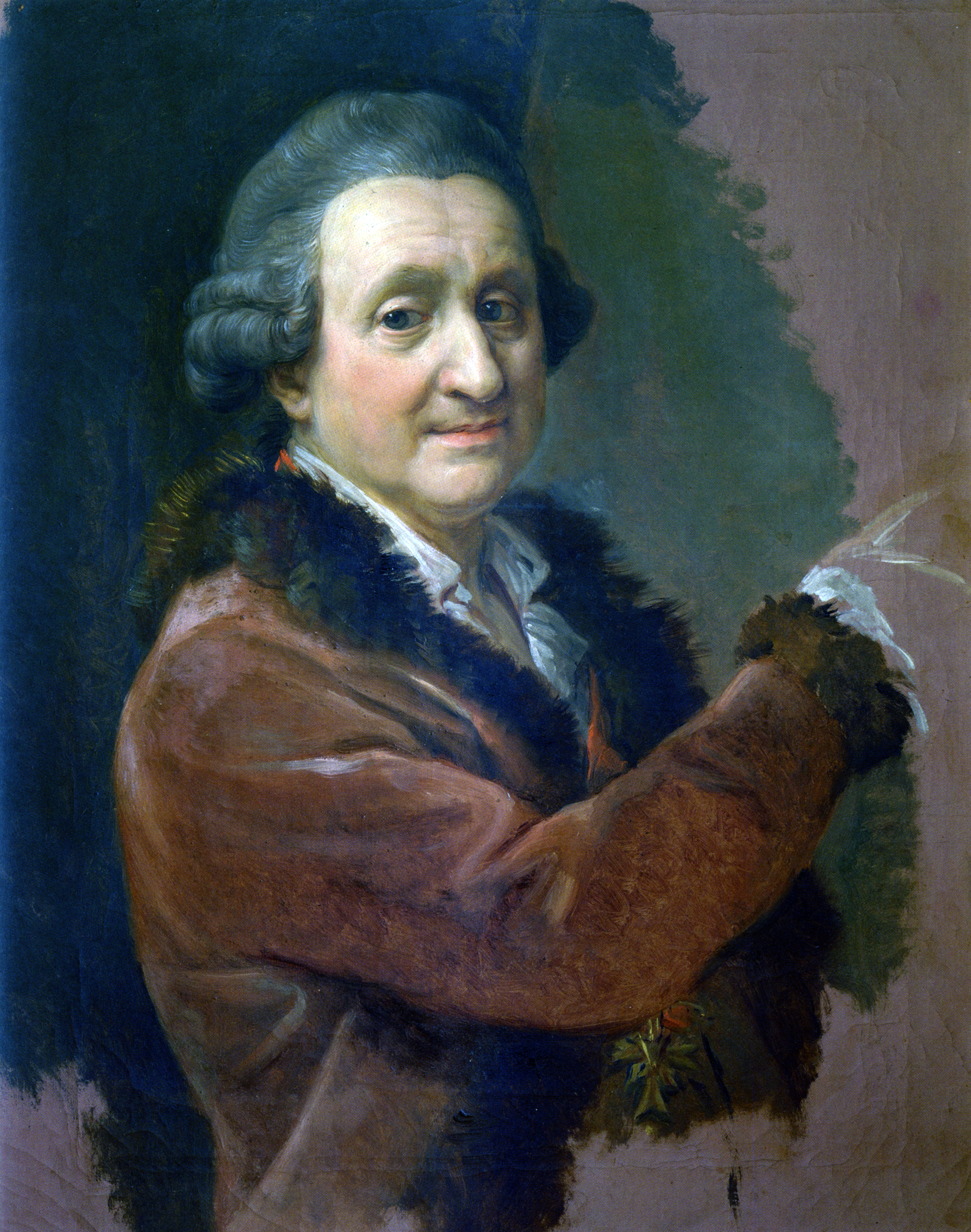
Pompeo Batoni born 25 January

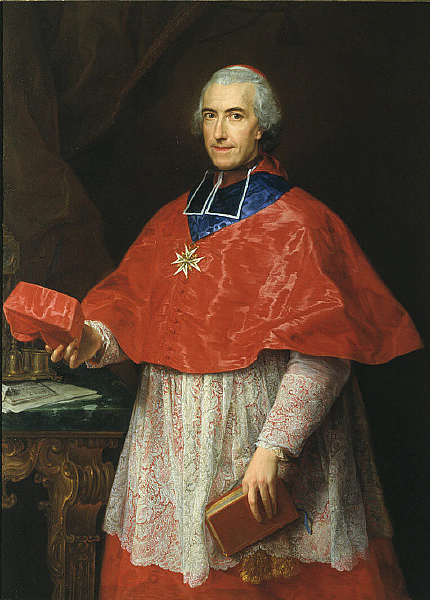
Jean-François-Joseph de Rochechouart born 27 January

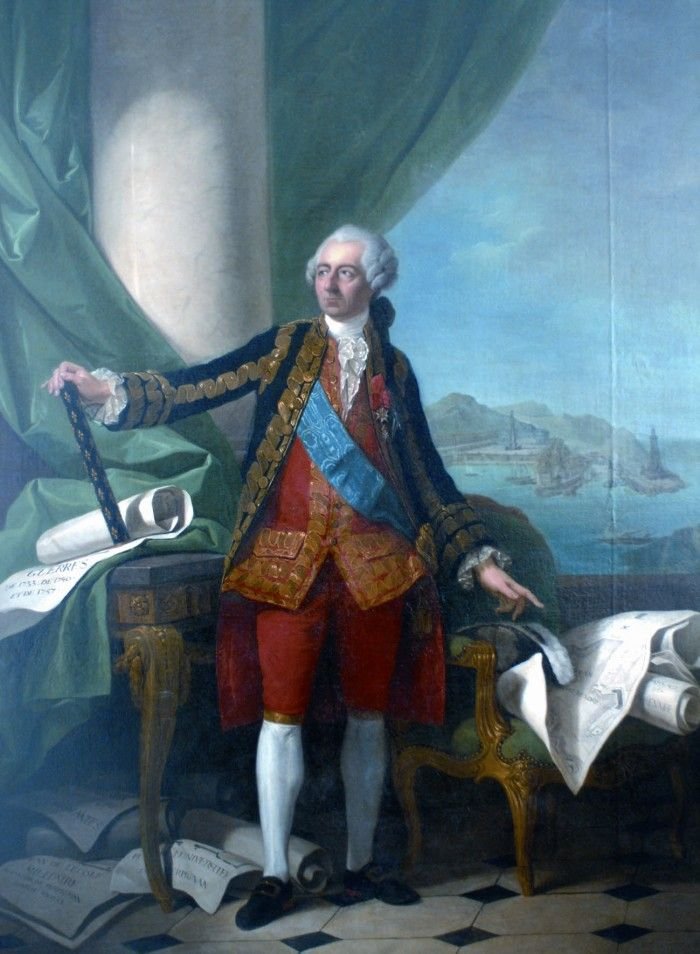
Augustin-Joseph de Mailly born 5 April

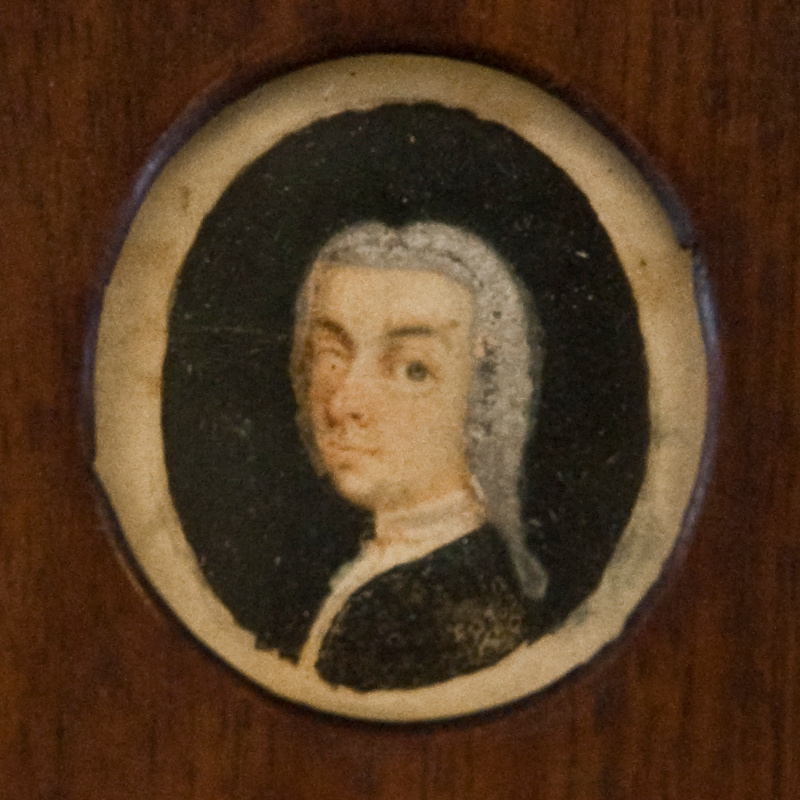
Johann Adolf Scheibe born 5 May

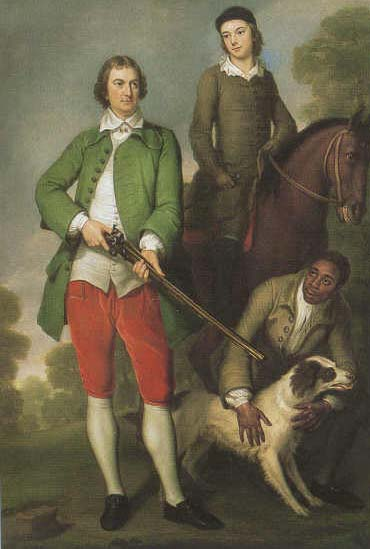
John Spencer born 13 May

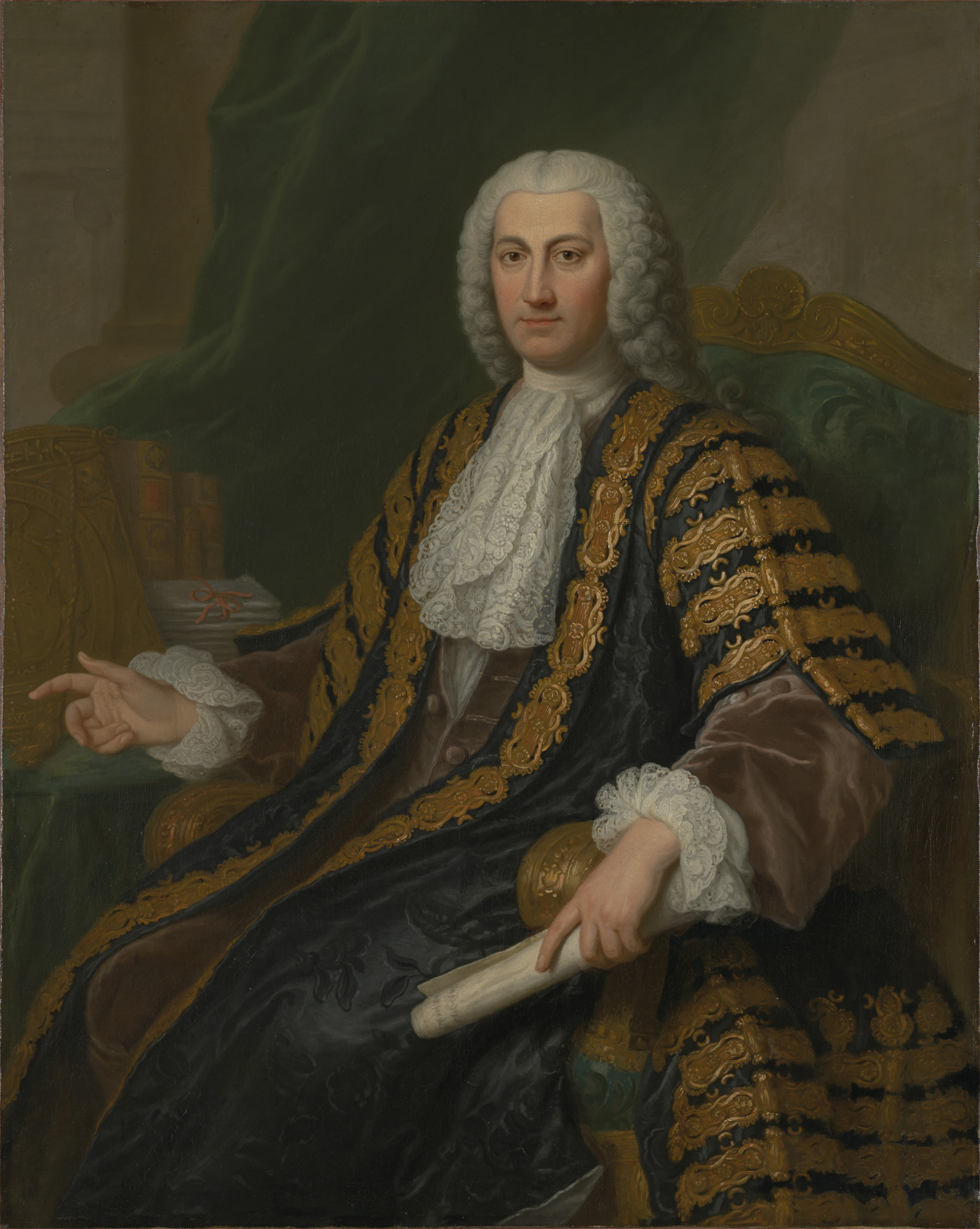
Henry Bilson-Legge born 29 May

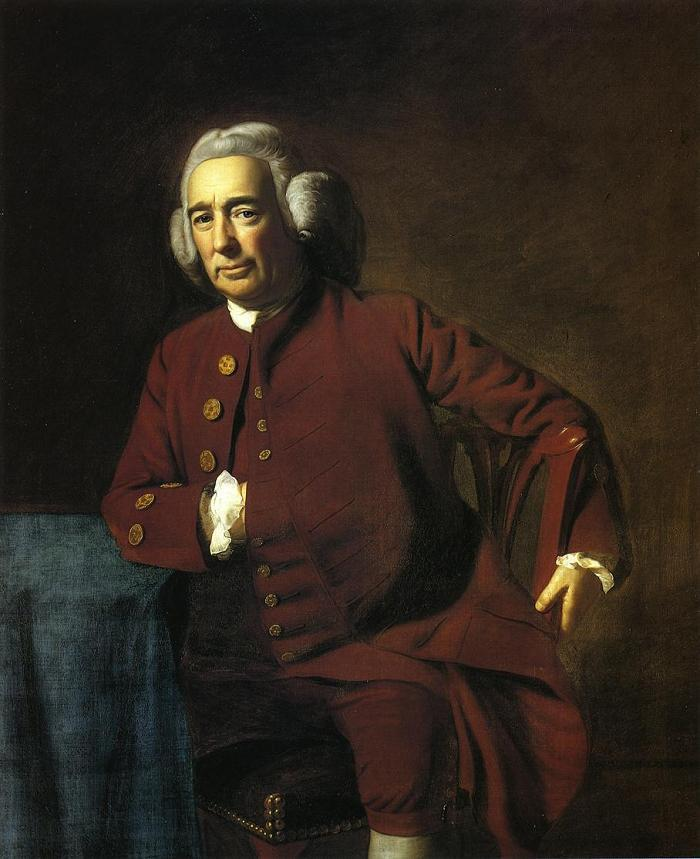
Silvester Gardiner born 29 June

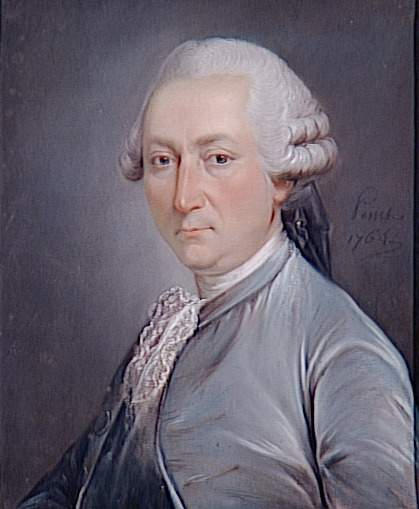
Jean-Rodolphe Perronet born 27 October

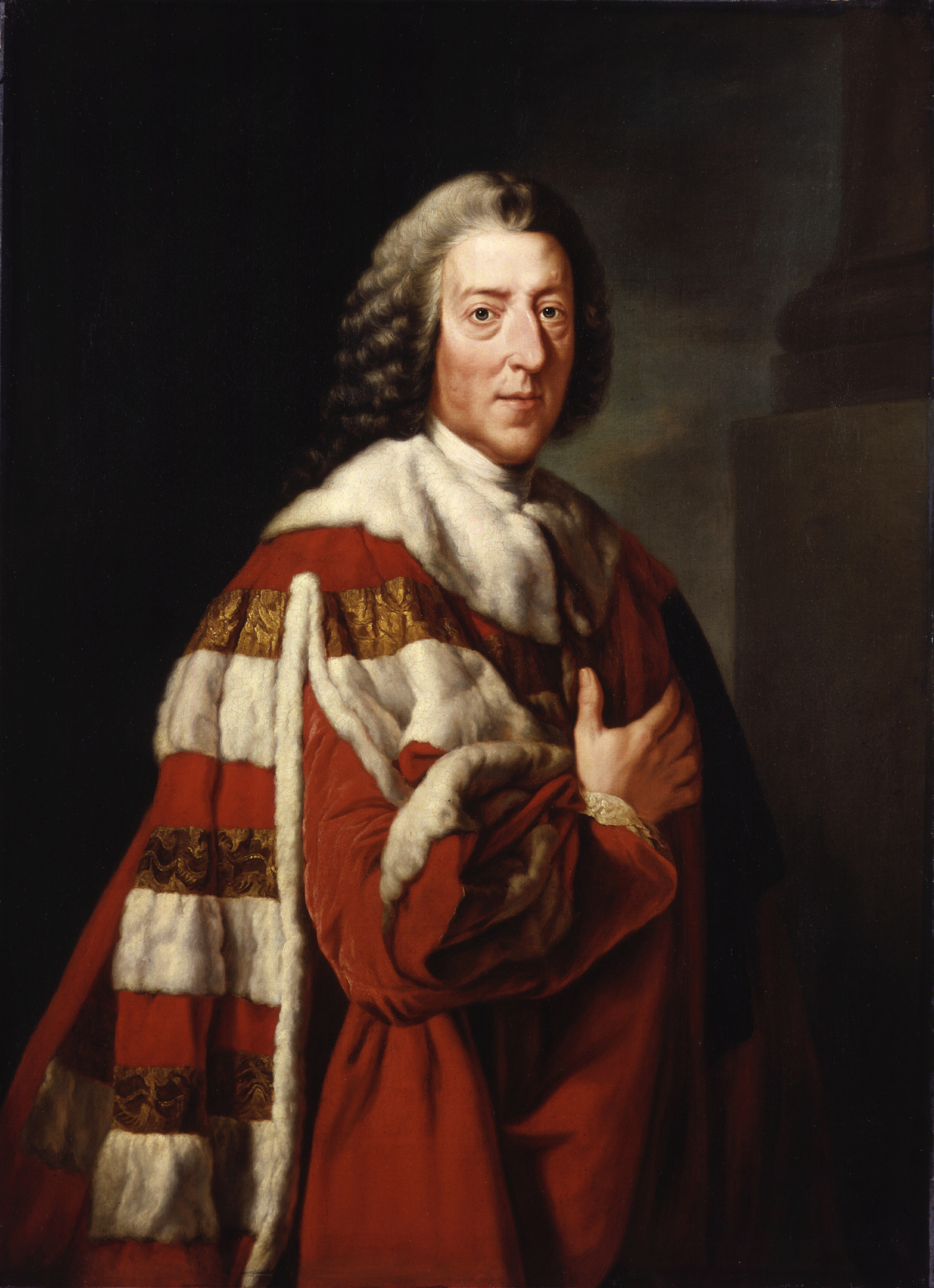
William Pitt, 1st Earl of Chatham born 15 November

- January 1 – Anton Wilhelm Plaz, German physician and botanist (d. 1784)
- January 3 – Johannes Van Rensselaer, member of the prominent colonial Van Rensselaer family (d. 1783)
- January 10 – Donat Nonnotte, French painter who specialized in portraiture (d. 1785)
- January 14 – Charles Armand René de La Trémoille, French soldier and president of the States of Brittany (d. 1741)
- January 15 – Giovanni Salvemini, Italian mathematician and astronomer (d. 1791)
- January 17 – Henry Brydges, 2nd Duke of Chandos (d. 1771)
- January 23 – Luigi Crespi, Italian painter (d. 1779)
- January 25 – Pompeo Batoni, Italian painter (d. 1787)
- January 26 – William Hayes, composer (d. 1777)
- January 27
  - Robert Marsham, English naturalist considered to be the founding father of phenology (d. 1797)
  - Jean-François-Joseph de Rochechouart, French Roman Catholic Cardinal (d. 1777)
- January 30 – Georg Dionysius Ehret, botanist and entomologist known for his botanical illustrations (d. 1770)
- February 3 – Johann Michael Hartung, German organ builder and public figure from Dürkheim (d. 1763)
- February 8 – Václav Jan Kopřiva, Bohemian composer and organist (d. 1789)
- February 11 – Egidio Duni, Italian composer who studied in Naples and worked in Italy (d. 1775)
- February 15
  - Alexander Hume-Campbell, Scottish lawyer and politician (d. 1760)
  - Hugh Hume-Campbell, 3rd Earl of Marchmont, Scottish politician (d. 1794)
- February 19 – Scrope Berdmore, English clergyman (d. 1770)
- February 23 – Chauncy Townsend, City of London merchant and a Member of Parliament in the Parliament of Great Britain (d. 1770)
- February 25 – Felix Benda, Bohemian composer and organist (d. 1768)
- February 29
  - Louis Charles du Chaffault de Besné, French naval commander (d. 1794)
  - Peter Jefferson, father of US President Thomas Jefferson (1743–1826) (d. 1757)
- March 5
  - Susanna Boylston, prominent early-American socialite (d. 1797)
  - Moritz Franz Kasimir von Wobersnow, Prussian major general of infantry and a general adjutant of Frederick the Great (d. 1759)
- March 8 – John Campbell, Scottish author (d. 1775)
- March 15 – John Hulse, British Anglican priest (d. 1790)
- March 17 – Johanna Magdalene of Saxe-Weissenfels, Duchess consort of Courland (d. 1760)
- March 22 – Ernst Henrich Berling, German-Danish book printer and publisher (d. 1750)
- March 26 – Robert Rochfort, 1st Earl of Belvedere (d. 1774)
- March 31 – Jean Chastel, farmer and inn-keeper from the province of Gévaudan in France (d. 1790)
- April 3
  - Johann Christian Cuno, German poet (d. 1783)
  - Antoine-Gaspard Boucher d'Argis, French lawyer (d. 1791)
- April 5 – Augustin-Joseph de Mailly, French general (d. 1794)
- April 6 – Johann Georg Reutter, Austrian composer (d. 1772)
- April 12 – Rose Fuller, West Indies plantation owner and politician (d. 1777)
- April 18 – James Cholmondeley, British Army officer and Member of Parliament between 1731 and 1747 (d. 1775)
- April 23 – Friedrich von Hagedorn, German poet (d. 1754)
- April 25 – John Seccombe, author (d. 1792)
- April 28 – Johann Rudolf Engau, German jurist (d. 1755)
- May 1 – Lionel Tollemache, 4th Earl of Dysart (d. 1770)
- May 5 – Johann Adolf Scheibe, German-Danish composer and significant critic and theorist of music (d. 1776)
- May 8 – Girolamo Colonna di Sciarra, Italian Catholic Cardinal of the noble Colonna di Sciarra family (d. 1763)
- May 13
  - Maximilian Friedrich von Königsegg-Rothenfels, Archbishop-Elector of Cologne and the Bishop of Münster from 1761 to 1784 (d. 1784)
  - John Spencer, British nobleman and politician (d. 1746)
- May 25 – Wriothesley Russell, 3rd Duke of Bedford, English nobleman and peer (d. 1732)
- May 29 – Henry Bilson-Legge, English statesman and three times as Chancellor of the Exchequer (d. 1764)
- May 30 – Daniel Gralath, physicist and a mayor of Danzig (d. 1767)
- June 5 – Roger Townshend, British soldier and Member of Parliament (d. 1760)
- June 17 – Annibale degli Abati Olivieri, Italian archaeologist (d. 1789)
- June 19 – Johann Gottlieb Janitsch, German Baroque composer (d. 1763)
- June 20 – François-Élie Vincent, French painter of portrait miniatures (d. 1790)
- June 24 – Sir Henry Harpur, 5th Baronet, English baronet and politician (d. 1748)
- June 25 – Nicolas Antoine II Coulon de Villiers, French military officer in the King George's War (d. 1750)
- June 29 – Silvester Gardiner, physician (d. 1786)
- July 5 – Thomas Phillips, English Jesuit priest (d. 1774)
- July 8
  - Claude-Henri de Fusée de Voisenon, French playwright and writer (d. 1775)
  - Johann Jakob Zeiller, Austrian painter (d. 1783)
- July 10 – Johannes Enschedé, Dutch printer (d. 1780)
- July 17 – Frederick Christian, Margrave of Brandenburg-Bayreuth, member of the House of Hohenzollern (d. 1769)
- July 19 – Philip Francis, Anglo-Irish clergyman and writer (d. 1773)
- July 22 – Nathaniel Ames, Colonial American physician (d. 1764)
- August 26
  - Pierre-Joseph Bernard, French military man and salon poet with the reputation of a rake (d. 1775)
  - Matteo Capranica, Italian composer (d. 1776)
- August 29 – Olof von Dalin, Swedish nobleman (d. 1763)
- August 31 – Sir John Rogers, 3rd Baronet (d. 1773)
- September 2 – André le Breton, French publisher (d. 1779)
- September 4 – Jean-Baptiste Nicolas Roch de Ramezay, officer of the marines, colonial administrator for New France (d. 1777)
- September 6 – Charles Stanhope, Member of Parliament (MP) for Derby (d. 1736)
- September 9 – Paul Egede, Dano-Norwegian theologian (d. 1789)
- September 10 – Mathias Collett, Norwegian civil servant (d. 1759)
- September 16 – Catharina Freymann, Norwegian educator and pietist leader (d. 1791)
- September 24 – Manuel Rojo del Río y Vieyra, Archbishop of Manila (d. 1764)
- September 25 – Thomas Wood, British politician and MP (d. 1799)
- September 26 – Ignatius Sichelbart, German-Bohemian Jesuit missionary and painter (d. 1780)
- October 2 – William Sutherland, 17th Earl of Sutherland (d. 1750)
- October 4 – Antonio Francesco Vezzosi, Italian Theatine and biographical writer (d. 1783)
- October 5 – Johann Christoph Petzold, German sculptor who mainly worked in Denmark (d. 1762)
- October 9 – Louis César de La Baume Le Blanc, French nobleman, bibliophile and military man (d. 1780)
- October 12 – John Wall, English physician (d. 1776)
- October 16 – Albrecht von Haller, Swiss anatomist and physiologist (d. 1777)
- October 20 – Francis Webber, Anglican priest (d. 1771)
- October 22
  - Antoine-François, marquis de Lambertye, French aristocrat of the Ancien Régime (d. 1777)
  - Louis Günther II, Prince of Schwarzburg-Rudolstadt (d. 1790)
  - Frederic Louis Norden, Danish naval captain and explorer (d. 1742)
- October 27
  - Hill Boothby, English friend and late love of Samuel Johnson (d. 1756)
  - Jean-Rodolphe Perronet, French architect and structural engineer (d. 1794)
- November 7
  - William Plumsted, mayor of Philadelphia in 1750 (d. 1765)
  - Henry Rolle, 1st Baron Rolle (d. 1750)
- November 15 – William Pitt, 1st Earl of Chatham, Prime Minister of Great Britain (d. 1778)
- November 16 – Gregorio Babbi, Italian operatic tenor (d. 1768)
- November 28 – Sir John Frederick, 4th Baronet, British politician (d. 1783)
- November 30 – Antoine de Laurès, French poet and playwright from Languedoc (d. 1779)
- December 2
  - Theodorick Bland of Cawsons, clerk of the court of Prince George County, Virginia (d. 1784)
  - Marianus Königsperger, German composer, organist and Catholic Monk of the Benedictine Order (d. 1769)
- December 3 – Alessandro Ruspoli, 2nd Prince of Cerveteri, 2nd Principe di Cerveteri (d. 1779)
- December 6 – Christopher Dufrost de La Jemeraye, Canadian explorer and cartographer (d. 1736)
- December 8
  - Francis I, Holy Roman Emperor (d. 1765)
  - Sir Charles Hanbury Williams, Welsh diplomat, writer and satirist (d. 1759)
- December 10
  - John Poulett, 2nd Earl Poulett (d. 1764)
  - Peregrine Poulett, British politician and MP (d. 1752)
- December 16 – Robert Livingston, third and final Lord of Livingston Manor (d. 1790)
- December 18 – John Collier, English caricaturist and satirical poet aka Tim Bobbin (d. 1786)
- December 28 – Sigmund von Haimhausen, Bavarian aristocrat (d. 1793)
- date unknown
  - Baal Shem of London, German-born Kabbalist (d. 1782)
  - Richard Dawes, English classical scholar (d. 1766)
  - Elizabeth Scott, British-American poet, hymnwriter (d. 1776)

1709

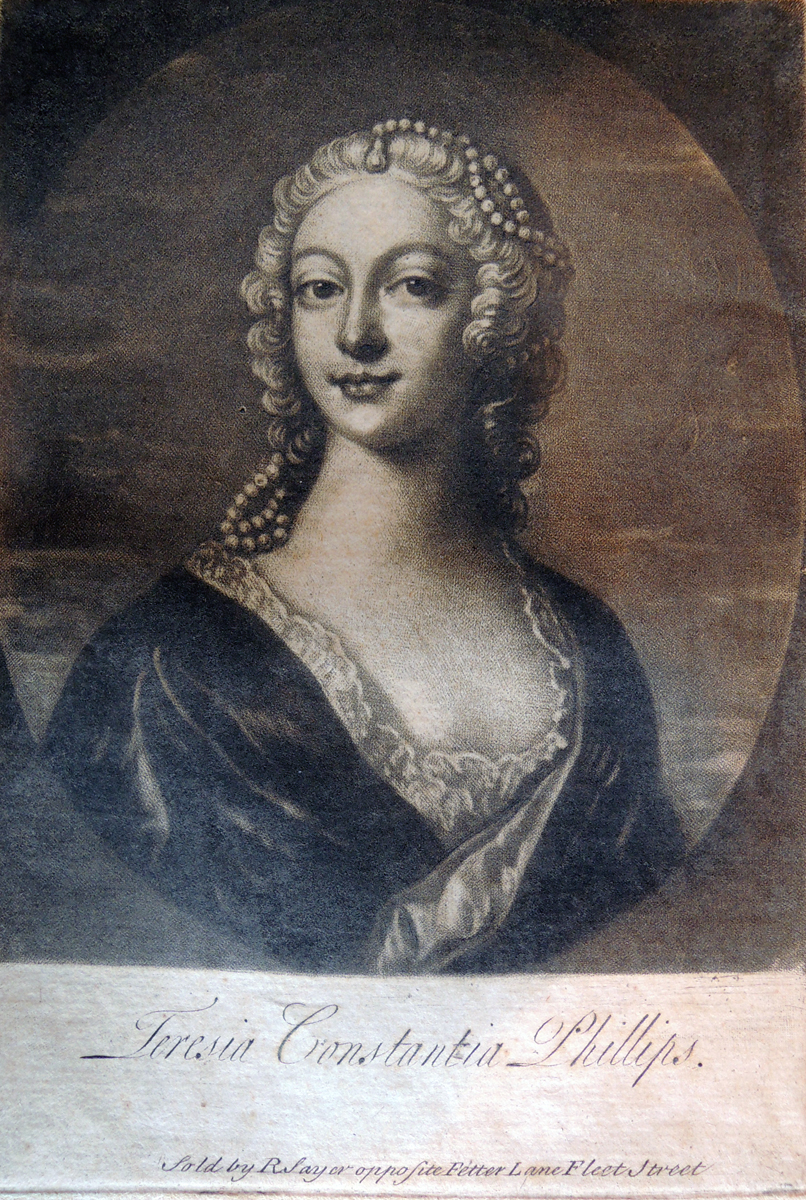
Teresia Constantia Phillips born 2 January

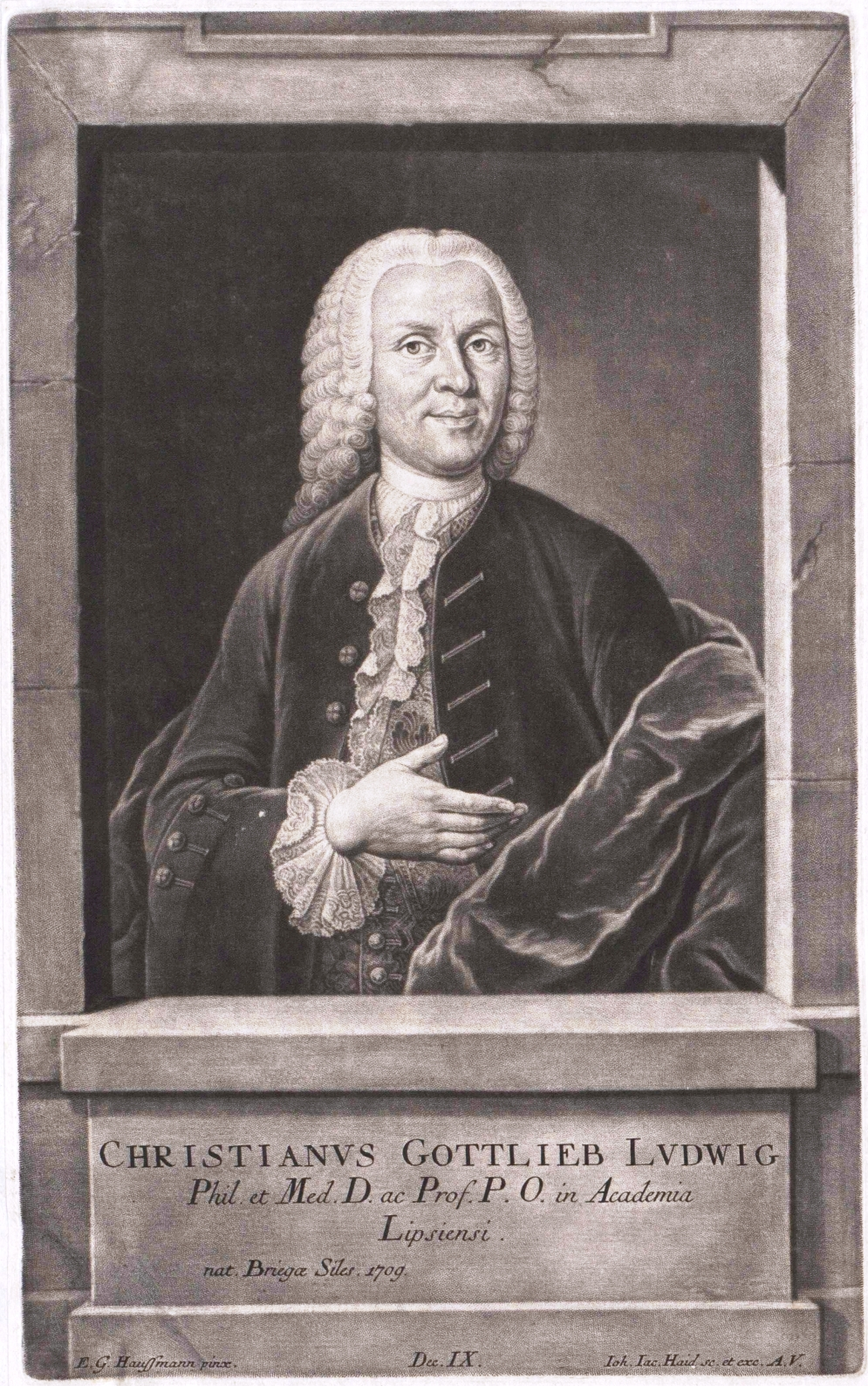
Christian Gottlieb Ludwig born 30 April

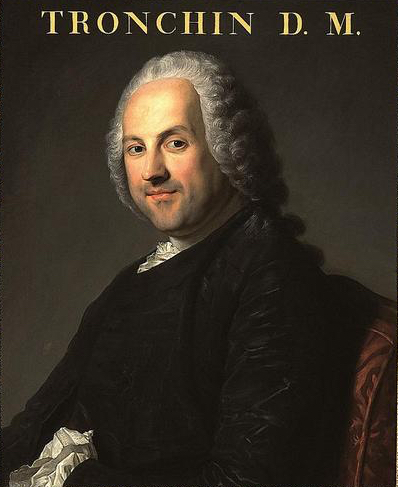
Théodore Tronchin born 24 May

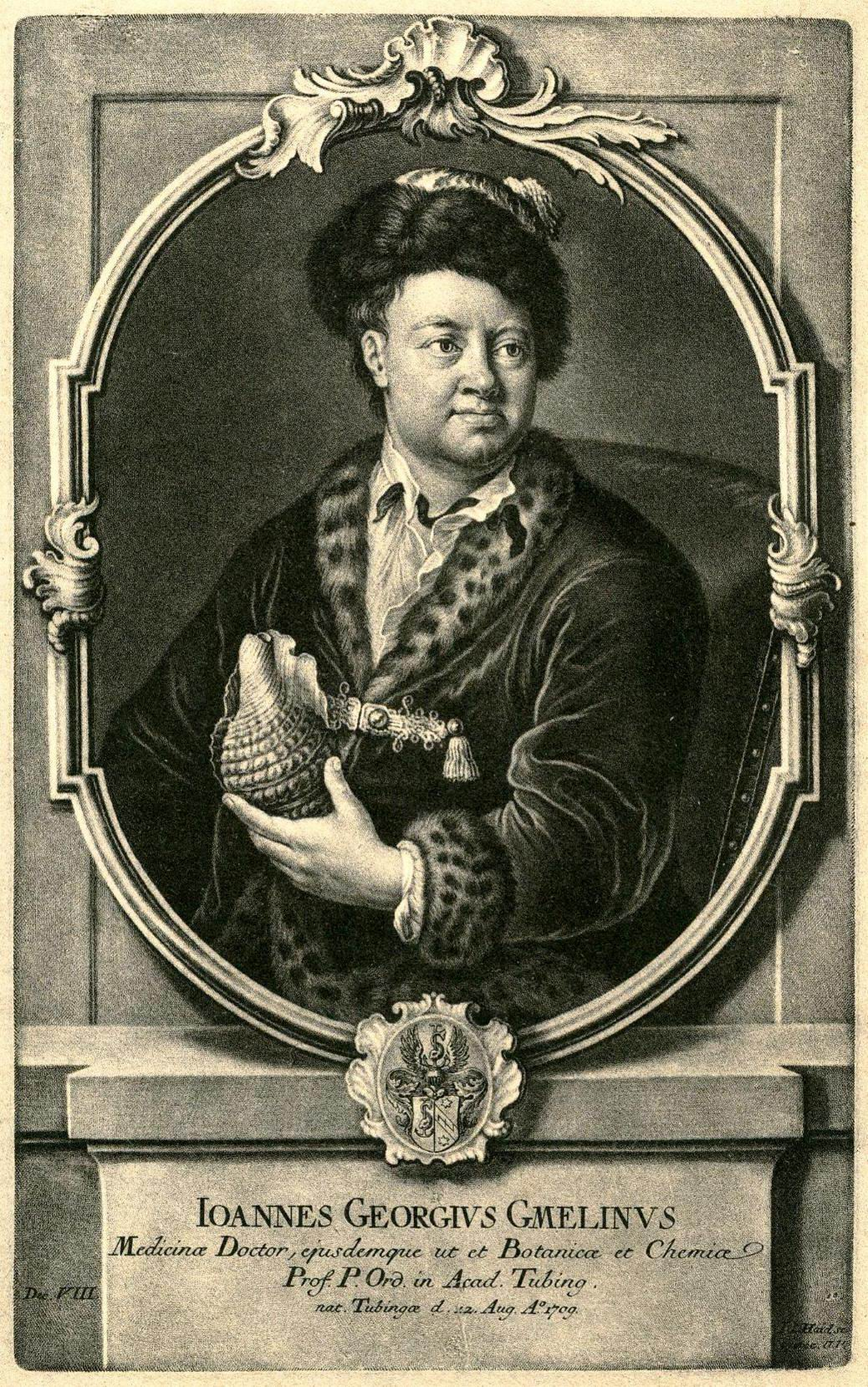
Johann Georg Gmelin born 8 August

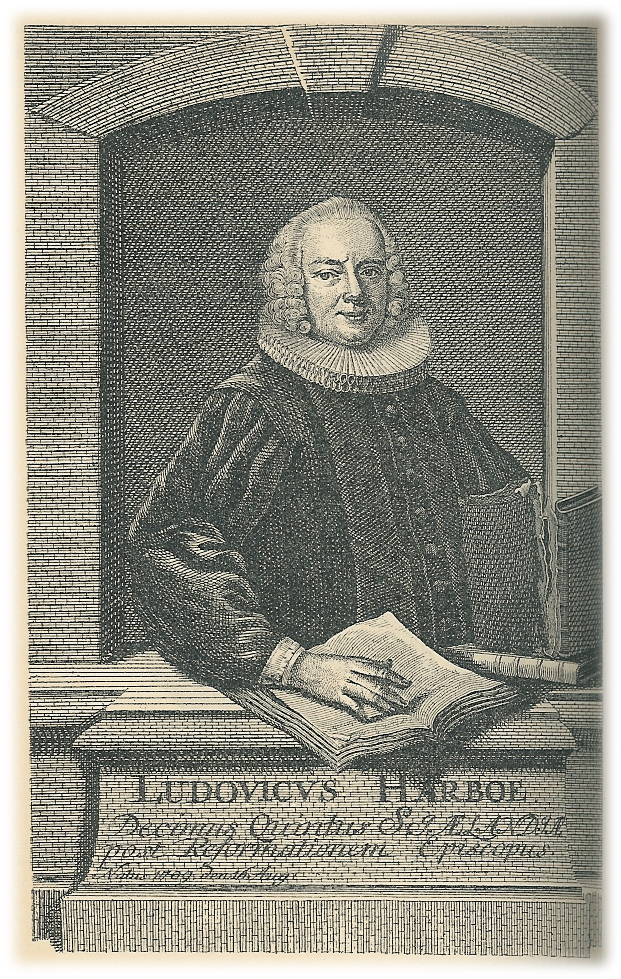
Ludvig Harboe born 16 August

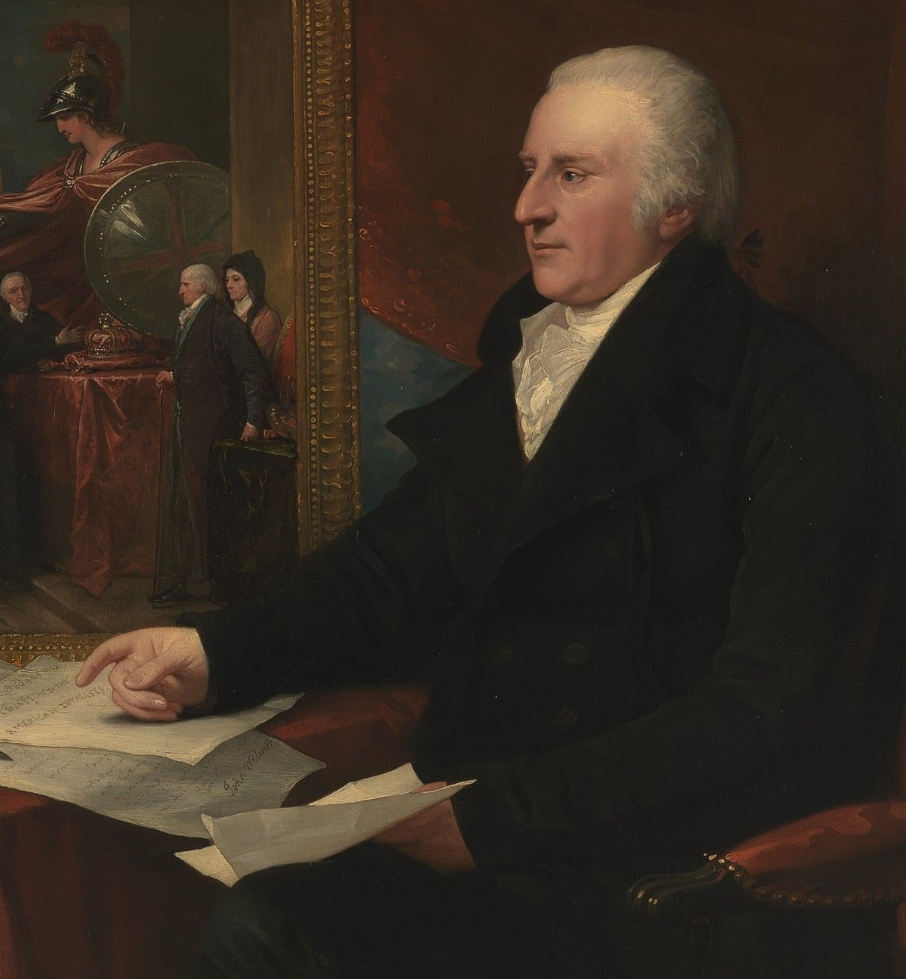
John Eardley Wilmot born 16 August

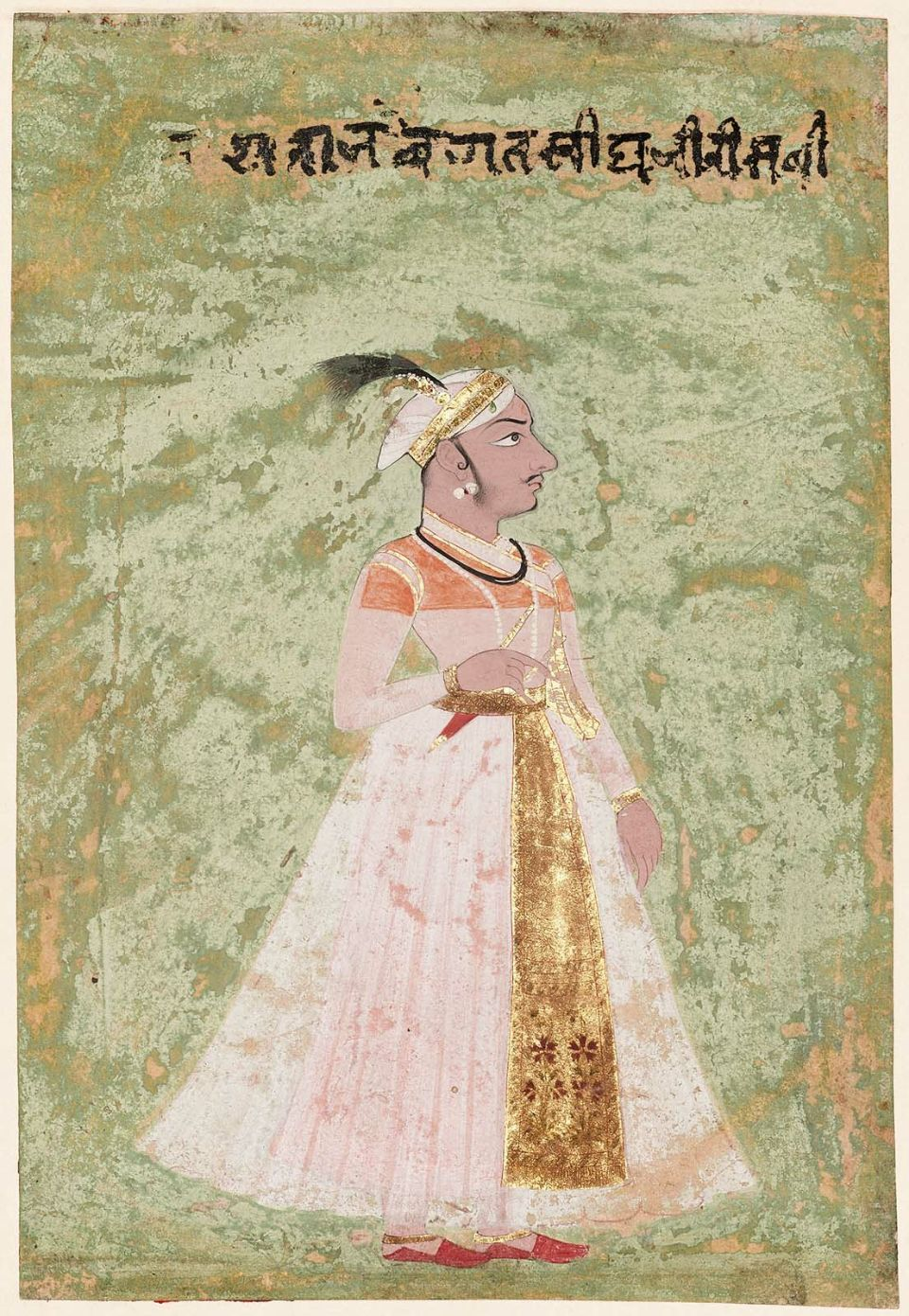
Jagat Singh II born 17 September

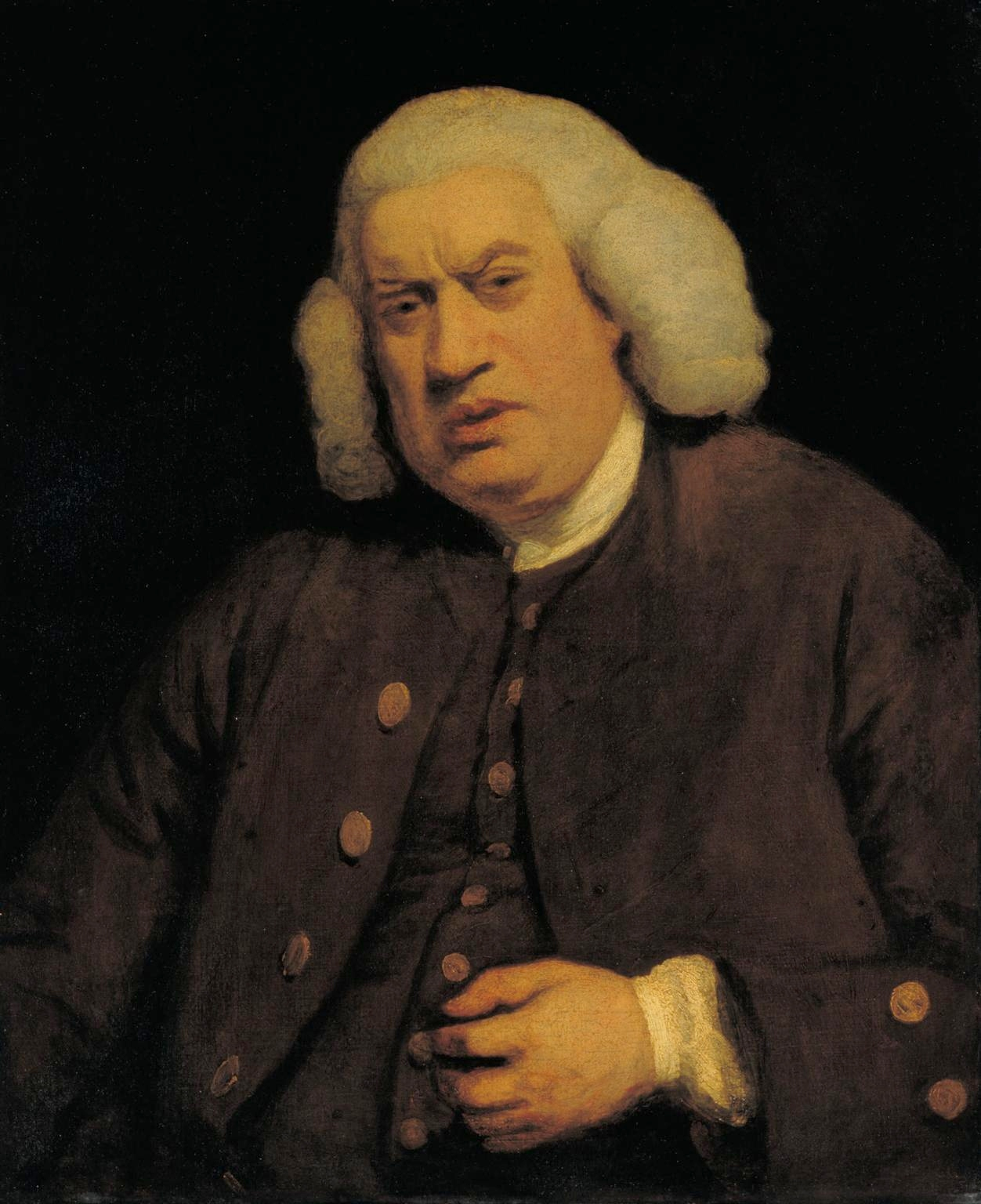
Samuel Johnson born 18 September

- January 2 – Teresia Constantia Phillips, British autobiographer (d. 1765)
- January 13 – Mollie Sneden, operator of a ferry service at Palisades, New York in the United States (d. 1810)
- January 17
  - Giovanni Ottavio Bufalini, Italian cardinal (d. 1782)
  - George Lyttelton, 1st Baron Lyttelton (d. 1773)
  - Margaret Rolle, 15th Baroness Clinton (d. 1781)
- January 24 – Dom Bédos de Celles, Benedictine monk and master pipe organ builder (d. 1779)
- February 7 – Charles de Brosses French writer (d. 1777)
- February 9 – George Venables-Vernon, 1st Baron Vernon, British politician (d. 1780)
- February 11 – William Courtenay, 1st Viscount Courtenay (d. 1762)
- February 12 – Jacques Barbeu-Dubourg, French physician (d. 1779)
- February 16 – Henrika Juliana von Liewen, Swedish political salonnière (d. 1779)
- February 24 – Jacques de Vaucanson, French inventor of mechanical automata (d. 1782)
- February 27 – Timothy Woodbridge American missionary, deacon, schoolteacher, judge, Superintendent of Indian Affairs (d. 1774)
- March 1 – William Bentinck, 2nd Duke of Portland (d. 1762)
- March 10
  - James Bentham, English clergyman (d. 1794)
  - Georg Wilhelm Steller, German botanist (d. 1746)
- March 14 – Sten Carl Bielke, scientist and member of the Swedish parliament (d. 1753)
- March 17 – Nicolò Arrighetti, Italian professor of natural philosophy (d. 1767)
- March 18 – Johannes Gessner, Swiss mathematician (d. 1790)
- March 31 – Louis-Charles Le Vassor de La Touche, French naval general, governor of Martinique, governor general of the Windward Islands (d. 1781)
- April 2 – Josiah Taft, farmer, local official, and Massachusetts legislator (d. 1756)
- April 6 – Thomas Hopkinson, lawyer (d. 1751)
- April 7 – William Stewart, 1st Earl of Blessington (d. 1769)
- April 14 – Charles Collé, French dramatist and songwriter (d. 1783)
- April 17 – Giovanni Domenico Maraldi, Italian-born astronomer (d. 1788)
- April 27 – Sir Francis Blake, 1st Baronet, of Twizell Castle (d. 1780)
- April 30 – Christian Gottlieb Ludwig, German physician and botanist born in Brieg (d. 1773)
- May 1 – Joachim Wasserschlebe, German-Danish diplomat (d. 1787)
- May 9 – Mihály Salbeck, doctor of philosophy, priest of the Society of Jesus, and teacher (d. 1758)
- May 24 – Théodore Tronchin, Genevan physician (d. 1781)
- May 27 – Margaret Lloyd, Welsh Moravian worker and activist (d. 1762)
- June 4 – Tomás Sánchez, veteran Spanish captain who founded Laredo (d. 1796)
- June 9
  - Nathaniel Booth, 4th Baron Delamer, English peer who served as Chairman of Committees in the House of Lords from 1765 (d. 1770)
  - Francis Towneley, English Catholic and supporter of the exiled House of Stuart or Jacobite (d. 1746)
- June 11 – Joachim Martin Falbe, German portrait painter (d. 1782)
- June 15 – Louis, Count of Clermont (d. 1771)
- June 28 – Nathan Tupper, farmer (d. 1784)
- July 4 – Antonio Orgiazzi il Vecchio, Italian painter active mainly in the Valselsia (d. 1788)
- July 5 – Étienne de Silhouette, French Ancien Régime Controller-General of Finances under Louis XV (d. 1767)
- July 10 – William Berners, English property developer and slave owner (d. 1783)
- July 11 – Johan Gottschalk Wallerius, Swedish chemist and mineralogist (d. 1785)
- July 15 – Antoine Matthieu Le Carpentier, French architect (d. 1773)
- July 17
  - Giovanni Carlo Bandi, Italian Cardinal who served as Bishop of Imola (d. 1784)
  - Friedrich Christian Baumeister, German philosopher (d. 1785)
  - Giuseppe Antonio Luchi, Italian painter (d. 1774)
- July 24 – James Harris, grammarian (d. 1780)
- August 8
  - Hermann Anton Gelinek, German monk and musician (d. 1779)
  - Johann Georg Gmelin, German naturalist (d. 1755)
  - Tokugawa Ietsugu, seventh shōgun of the Tokugawa dynasty (d. 1716)
- August 10 – Jean-Jacques Lefranc, Marquis de Pompignan, French man of letters and erudition (d. 1784)
- August 13 – William Clavering-Cowper, 2nd Earl Cowper, British noble (d. 1764)
- August 16
  - Ludvig Harboe, Danish theologian and bishop (d. 1783)
  - John Eardley Wilmot, English judge, Chief Justice of the Common Pleas (1766–1771) (d. 1792)
- August 18 – John Storr, officer of the Royal Navy (d. 1783)
- August 21 – Frederick Henry, Margrave of Brandenburg-Schwedt (d. 1788)
- August 26 – Guillaume Repin, French priest and martyr (d. 1794)
- August 29 – Jean-Baptiste-Louis Gresset, French poet and dramatist (d. 1777)
- August 30 – Frobenius Forster, German Benedictine (d. 1791)
- September 5 – Rudolf Füssli, Swiss painter (d. 1793)
- September 10 – Hachisuka Munekazu, Japanese daimyō of the Edo period (d. 1735)
- September 12 – Charles Somerset, 4th Duke of Beaufort (d. 1756)
- September 17 – Jagat Singh II, Maharana of Mewar Kingdom (d. 1751)
- September 18 – Samuel Johnson, English poet, biographer, essayist, and lexicographer (d. 1784)
- September 29 – Joseph Gerrish, soldier (d. 1774)
- October 5
  - Peter Applebye, British-Danish industrialist (d. 1774)
  - Ludovico Stern, Italian painter of the Rococo or late-Baroque period (d. 1777)
- October 6 – Edward Kynaston, British landowner and Tory MP (d. 1772)
- October 9
  - Jean-Baptiste de Belloy, Archbishop of Paris and cardinal of the Catholic Church (d. 1808)
  - John Clayton, English clergyman (d. 1773)
- October 12 – Lord Anne Hamilton, Scottish nobleman (d. 1748)
- October 13 – John Cole, 1st Baron Mountflorence, Irish peer and politician (d. 1767)
- October 16 – Johann Daniel Ritter, German historian (d. 1775)
- October 17 – Jean-Gabriel Berbudeau, French-born surgeon who spent time practicing medicine in eastern Canada (d. 1792)
- October 19 – Sewallis Shirley, British Member of Parliament in the reign of George II (d. 1765)
- October 25
  - Georg Gebel, German musician and composer (d. 1753)
  - Jan Wagenaar, Dutch historian (d. 1773)
- November 1 – Ignatius von Weitenauer, German Jesuit writer (d. 1783)
- November 2 – Anne, Princess Royal and Princess of Orange, Hanoverian-born regent of Friesland (d. 1759)
- November 6 – Christopher Marshall, leader in the American Revolution (d. 1797)
- November 15 – Dirk Klinkenberg, mathematician, amateur astronomer, secretary of the Dutch government for 40 years (d. 1799)
- November 18 – Henry Loftus, 1st Earl of Ely (d. 1783)
- November 22 – Johann Friedrich Wilhelm Jerusalem, German Lutheran theologian during the Age of Enlightenment (d. 1789)
- November 26 – Battle of Samana
- December 1 – Franz Xaver Richter, Austro-Moravian singer, violinist, composer, conductor and music theoretician (d. 1789)
- December 9 – Pierre II Surette, art of the Acadian and Wabanaki Confederacy resistance against the British Empire in Acadia (d. 1789)
- December 14
  - Caspar Friedrich Hachenberg, rector of the Latin school of Wageningen, The Netherlands, and writer of Greek and Latin grammars (d. 1793)
  - Charles Lawrence, British military officer who (d. 1760)
- December 18 – Elizabeth of Russia, empress regnant of Russia (d. 1762)
- December 21
  - Charles Frederick, MP (d. 1785)
  - Arnaud-François Lefèbvre, Apostolic Vicar of Cochin (d. 1760)
- December 24 – Johann Evangelist Holzer, Austrian-German painter (d. 1740)

== Deaths ==
1700

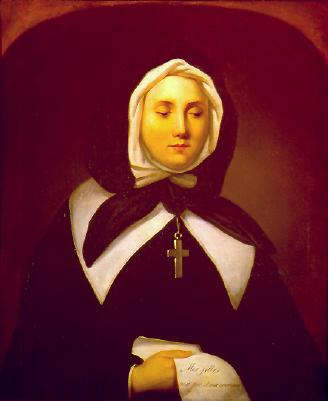
Marguerite Bourgeoys died 12 January

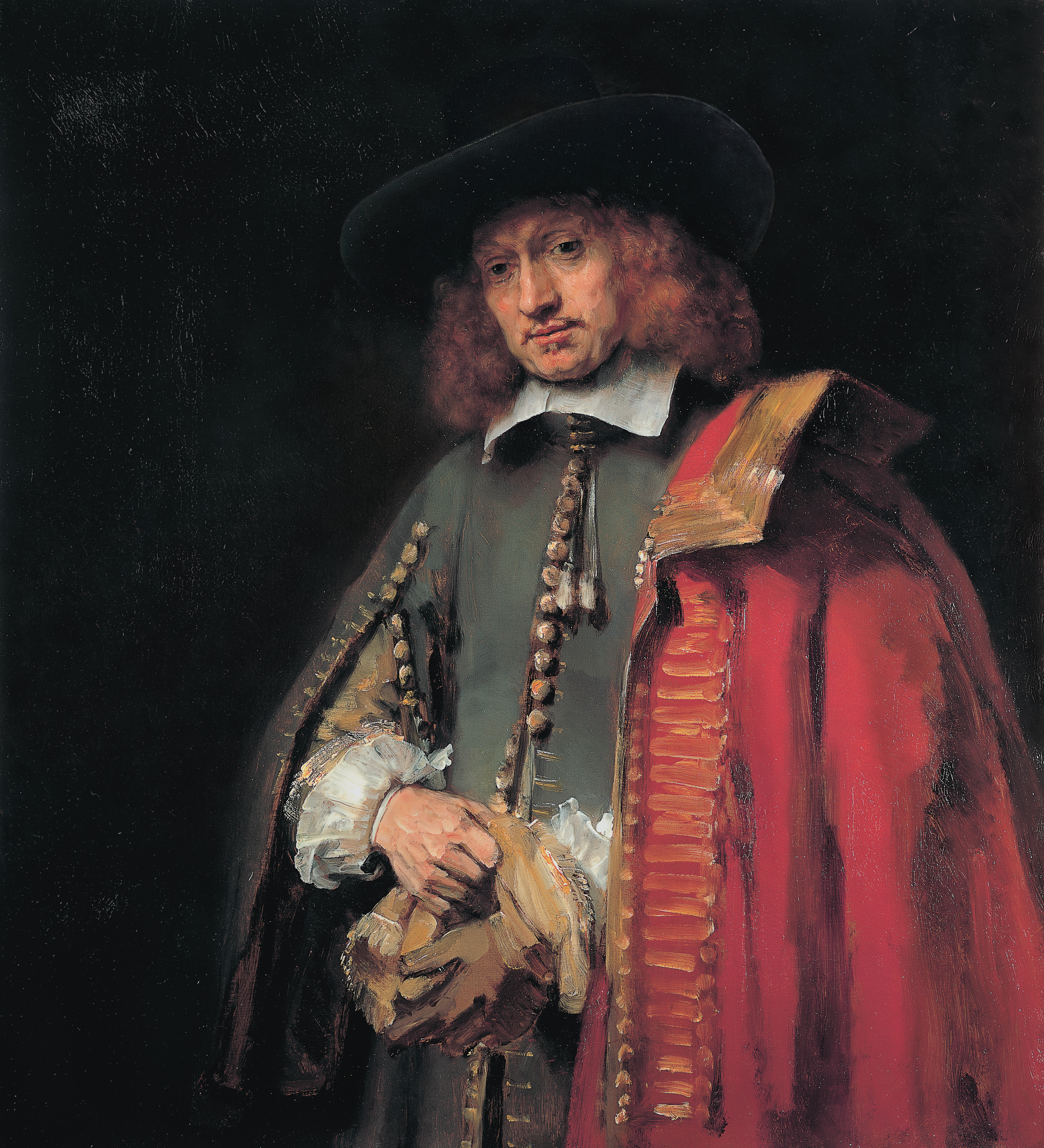
Jan Six died May 28

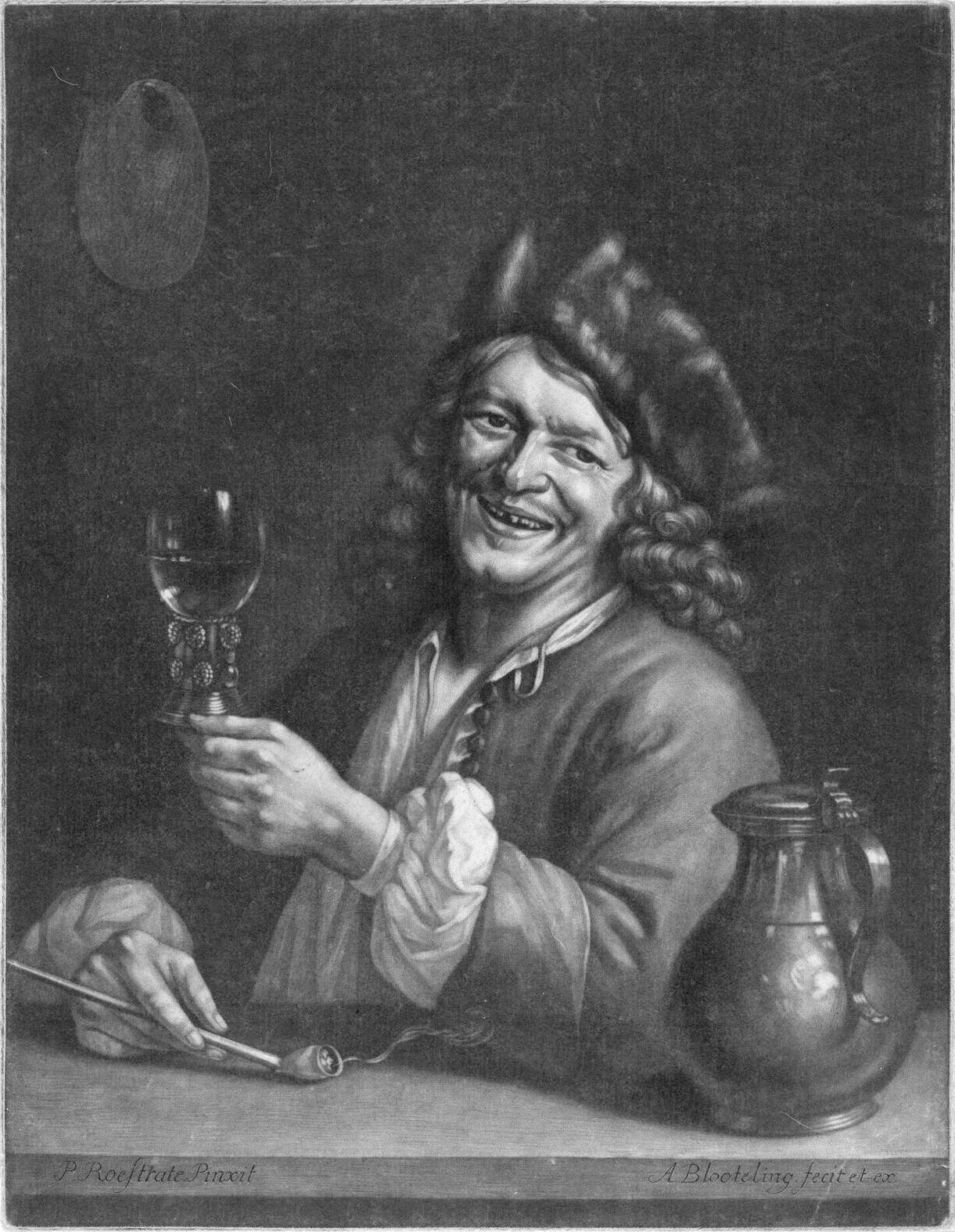
Pieter Gerritsz van Roestraten died 10 July

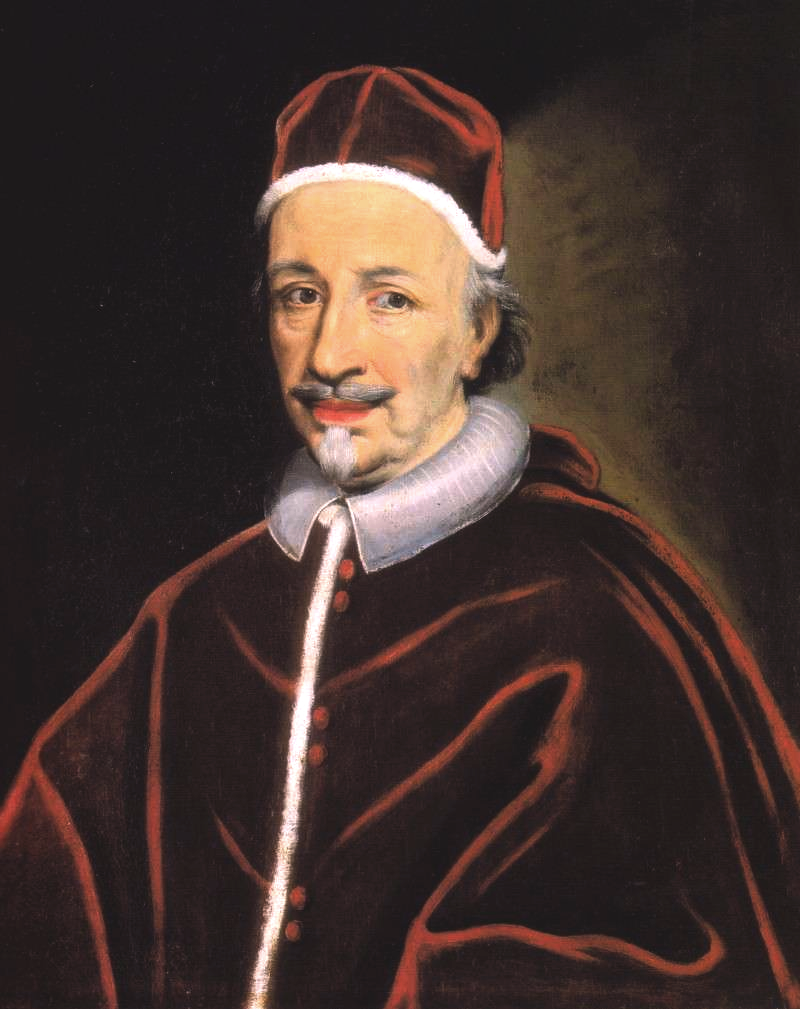
Pope Innocent XII died September 27

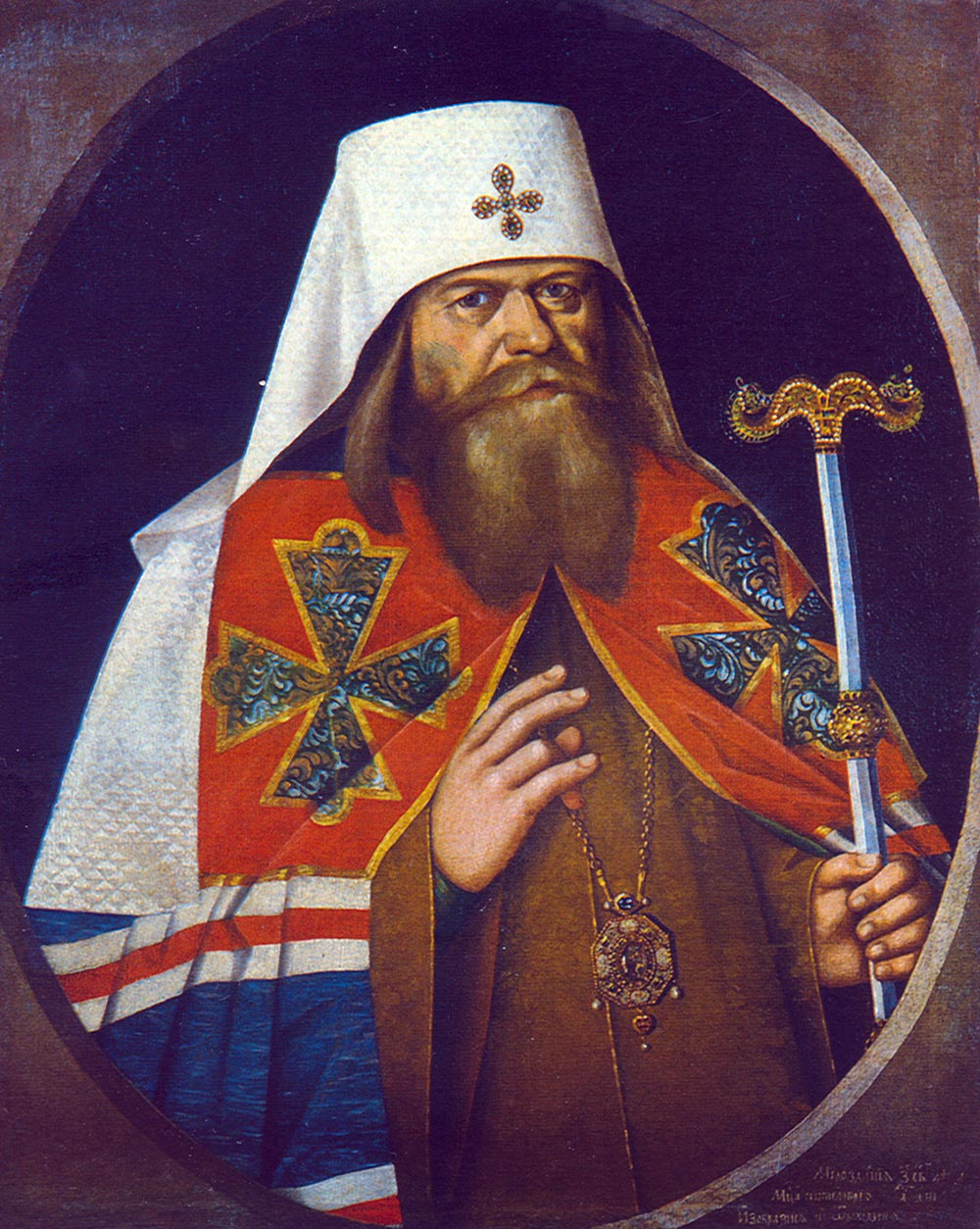
Patriarch Adrian of Moscow died 16 October

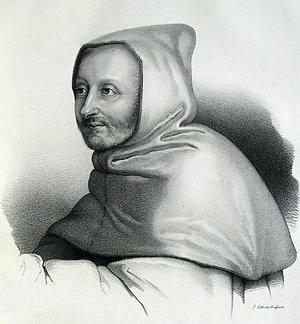
Armand Jean le Bouthillier de Rancé died 27 October

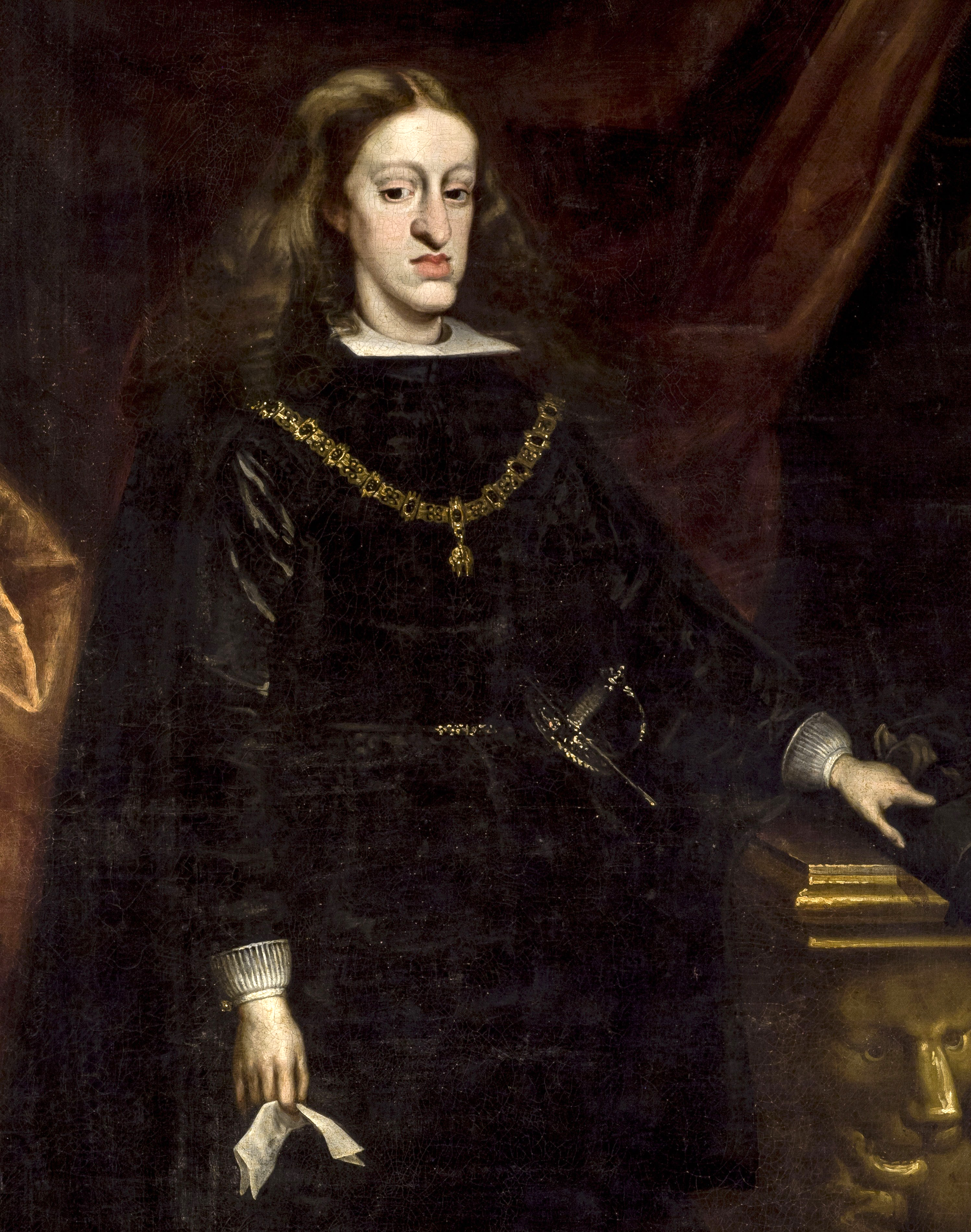
Charles II of Spain died 1 November

- January 7 – Raffaello Fabretti, Italian antiquary (b. 1618)
- January 12 – Marguerite Bourgeoys, French founder of the Congregation of Notre Dame of Montreal, in the colony of New France (b. 1620)
- January 21 – Henry Somerset, 1st Duke of Beaufort, English politician (b. 1629)
- January 30 – Clara Elisabeth von Platen, German noblewoman (b. 1648)
- February 4 – John Bramston the Younger, English lawyer and MP (b. 1611)
- February 5 – Louis Maracci, Italian priest (b. 1612)
- February 12 – Aleksei Shein, Russian commander and statesman (b. 1662)
- February 25 – James Douglas, 2nd Marquess of Douglas (b. 1646)
- March 2 – Jankibai, Empress consort of the Maratha Empire as the first wife of Rajaram Chhatrapati (b. 1675)
- March 3
  - Chhatrapati Rajaram Raje Bhonsale, 3rd Maratha Emperor (b. 1670)
  - Girolamo Casanata, Italian cardinal (b. 1620)
- March 4 – Lorenzo Pasinelli, Italian painter (b. 1629)
- March 8 – William Dunlop, Covenanter (b. c. 1654)
- March 14 – Henry Killigrew, English clergyman and playwright (b. 1613)
- March 18 – Francesco Scannagatta, Roman Catholic prelate and Bishop of Avellino e Frigento (b. 1632)
- March 26 – Heinrich Meibom, German physician and scholar (b. 1638)
- May 1
  - Marc-René de Voyer de Paulmy d'Argenson, French administrator, diplomat and ambassador to Venetian Republic (b. 1623)
  - Francis Winnington, Solicitor-General for England and Wales (b. 1634)
- May 5 – Angelo Italia, Sicilian architect (b. 1628)
- May 12 – John Dryden, English poet and dramatist (b. 1631)
- May 15 – John Hale, American witch hunter and pastor (b. 1636)
- May 18 – Teofil Rutka, Polish philosopher (b. 1622)
- May 23 – Jens Juel, Danish diplomat (b. 1631)
- May 28 – Jan Six, important cultural figure in the Dutch Golden Age (b. 1618)
- May 31 – Agostino Scilla, Italian painter and scientist (b. 1629)
- June 20 – Richard Gilpin, English nonconformist minister and physician (b. 1625)
- June 29 – Olov Svebilius, Swedish priest and professor (b. 1624)
- July 2
  - Lambert Doomer, Dutch Golden Age landscape painter (b. 1624)
  - Sir Thomas Grosvenor, 3rd Baronet, English politician (b. 1656)
  - Hoshina Masakage, Japanese daimyō of the Edo period (b. 1616)
- July 7 – Silvestro Valier, 109th Doge of Venice (b. 1630)
- July 10
  - Pieter Gerritsz van Roestraten, Dutch Golden Age painter of still lifes and genre scenes (b. 1630)
  - John Lowther, 1st Viscount Lonsdale, English politician (b. 1655)
- July 19 (found dead) – Thomas Creech, English translator of classical works, headmaster of Sherborne School (b. 1659)
- July 22 – Alderano Cybo, Italian Catholic Cardinal (b. 1613)
- July 30 – Prince William, Duke of Gloucester, member of the English royal family (b. 1689)
- August 17 – Thomas-Claude Renart de Fuchsamberg Amblimont, French naval officer, governor general of the French Antilles (b. 1642)
- August 22 – Carlos de Sigüenza y Góngora, Mexican academic (b. 1645)
- August 30 – Sir Richard Cust, 1st Baronet, English politician (b. 1622)
- August 31 – William Savile, 2nd Marquess of Halifax, English noble and politician (b. 1665)
- September 7 – William Russell, 1st Duke of Bedford, English noble and politician (b. 1616)
- September 15 – André Le Nôtre, French landscape gardener (b. 1613)
- September 16 – Martyrs of Cajonos, Mexican Catholic converts (b. c. 1660)
- September 23 – Nicolaus Adam Strungk, German composer and violinist (b. 1640)
- September 27 – Pope Innocent XII, born Antonio Pignatelli (b. 1615)
- September 30 – Lorenzo Trotti, Roman Catholic prelate, Archbishop of Pavia (1672–1700) (b. 1633)
- October 1 – Sir Samuel Grimston, 3rd Baronet, English politician (b. 1643)
- October 16 – Patriarch Adrian of Moscow, Russian Orthodox Church leader (b. 1627)
- October 17 – Eligio Caracciolo, Roman Catholic prelate, Archbishop of Cosenza (1694–1700) (b. 1654)
- October 23 – Anne Marie de Bourbon, daughter of the Prince of Condé and of a Bavarian princess (b. 1675)
- October 27 – Armand Jean le Bouthillier de Rancé, abbot of La Trappe Abbey, founder of the Trappists (b. 1626)
- October 31 – Sir Robert Napier, 1st Baronet, of Punknoll (b. 1642)
- November 1 – Charles II of Spain, King of Spain; last Habsburg ruler of the Spanish Empire (b. 1661)
- November 2 – Francis Turner, English bishop (b. 1637)
- November 4 – Sebastián de Pastrana, Roman Catholic prelate, Bishop of Paraguay (1693–1700) (b. 1633)
- November 11 – Sophie Angelika of Württemberg-Oels, by marriage Duchess of Saxe-Zeitz-Pegau-Neustadt (b. 1677)
- November 16 – Paul Rycaut, British diplomat (b. 1629)
- November 18 – Robert Walpole, English Whig politician, soldier and member of parliament (b. 1650)
- November 25 – Stephanus Van Cortlandt, first native-born mayor of New York City (b. 1643)
- November 26 – Tokugawa Mitsutomo, daimyō of Owari Domain during early Edo period Japan (b. 1625)
- December 5 – Mata Jito, first wife of the tenth Sikh Guru (b. 1673)
- December 13 – Inoha Seihei, bureaucrat of the Ryukyu Kingdom (b. 1648)
- December 15 – Juan Alfonso Valerià y Aloza, Roman Catholic prelate, Bishop of Lérida (1699–1700) (b. 1643)
- December 16 – Thomas Morgan, English politician (b. 1664)
- December 18 – Edward Harley, English politician (b. 1624)
- December 20 – Mary Bradbury, accused witch in Salem, Massachusetts (b. 1615)
- date unknown
  - Caius Gabriel Cibber, Danish sculptor working in England (b. 1630)
  - Kamalakara, Indian astronomer and mathematician (b. 1616)
  - Louis Jolliet, Canadian explorer (b. 1645)

1701

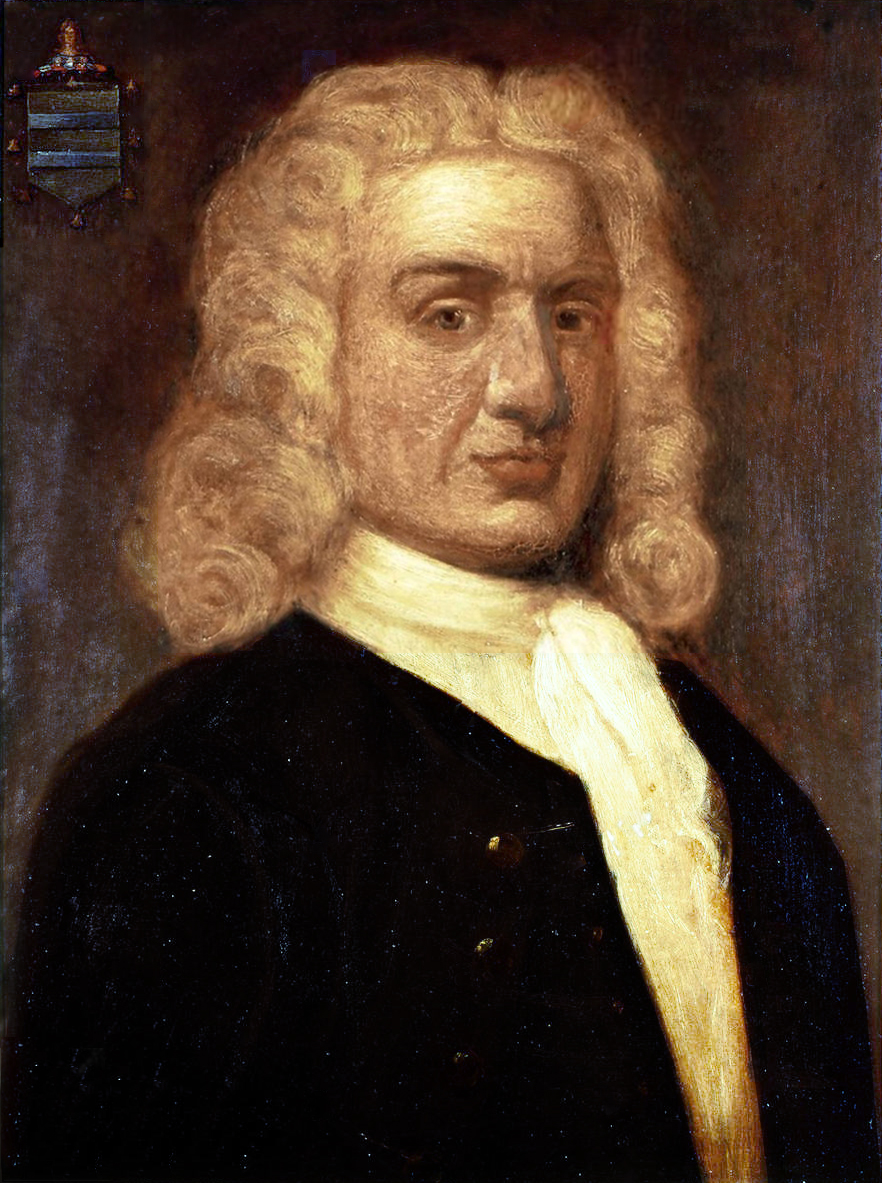
William Kidd died 23 May

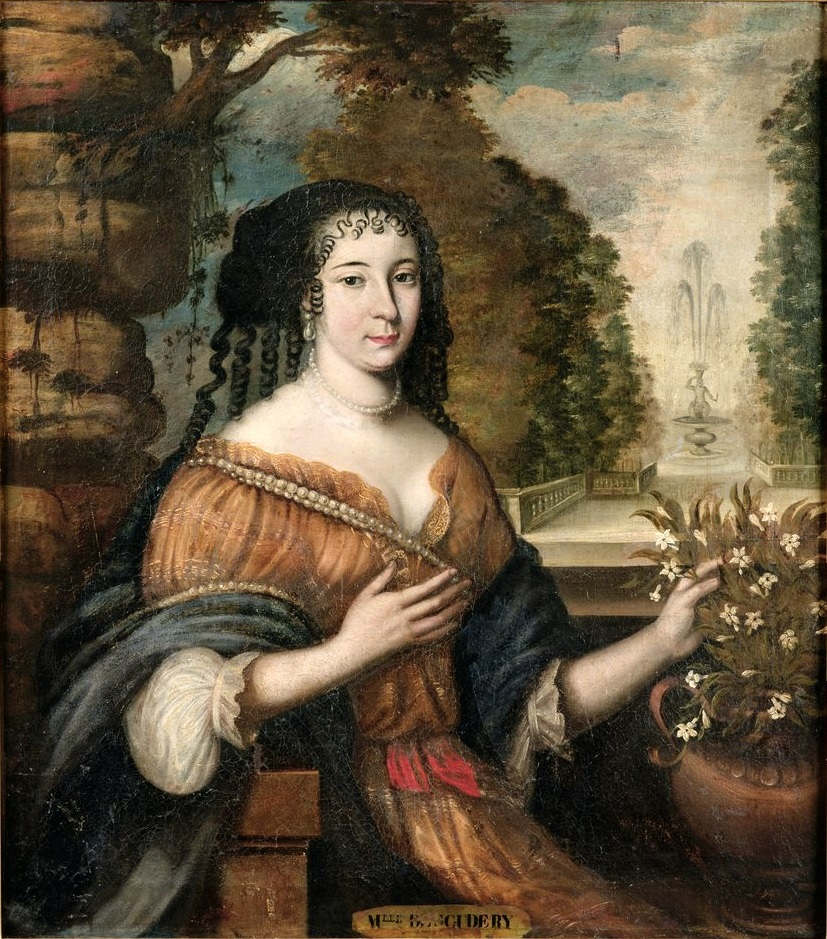
Madeleine de Scudéry died 2 June

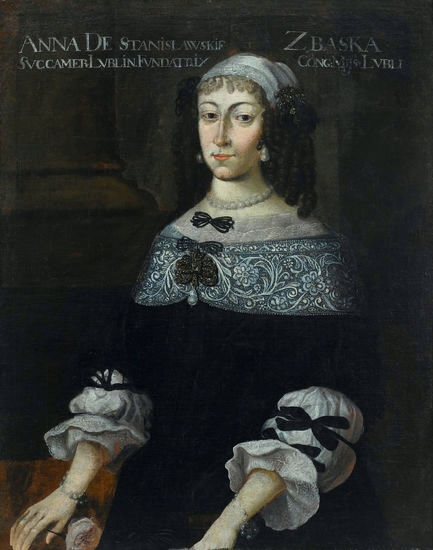
Anna Stanisławska died 2 June

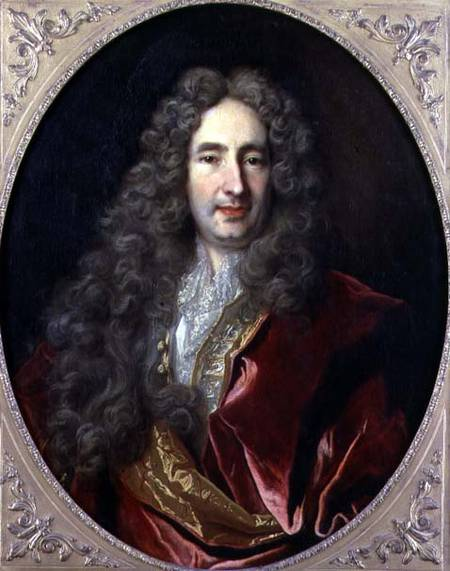
Edmé Boursault died 15 September

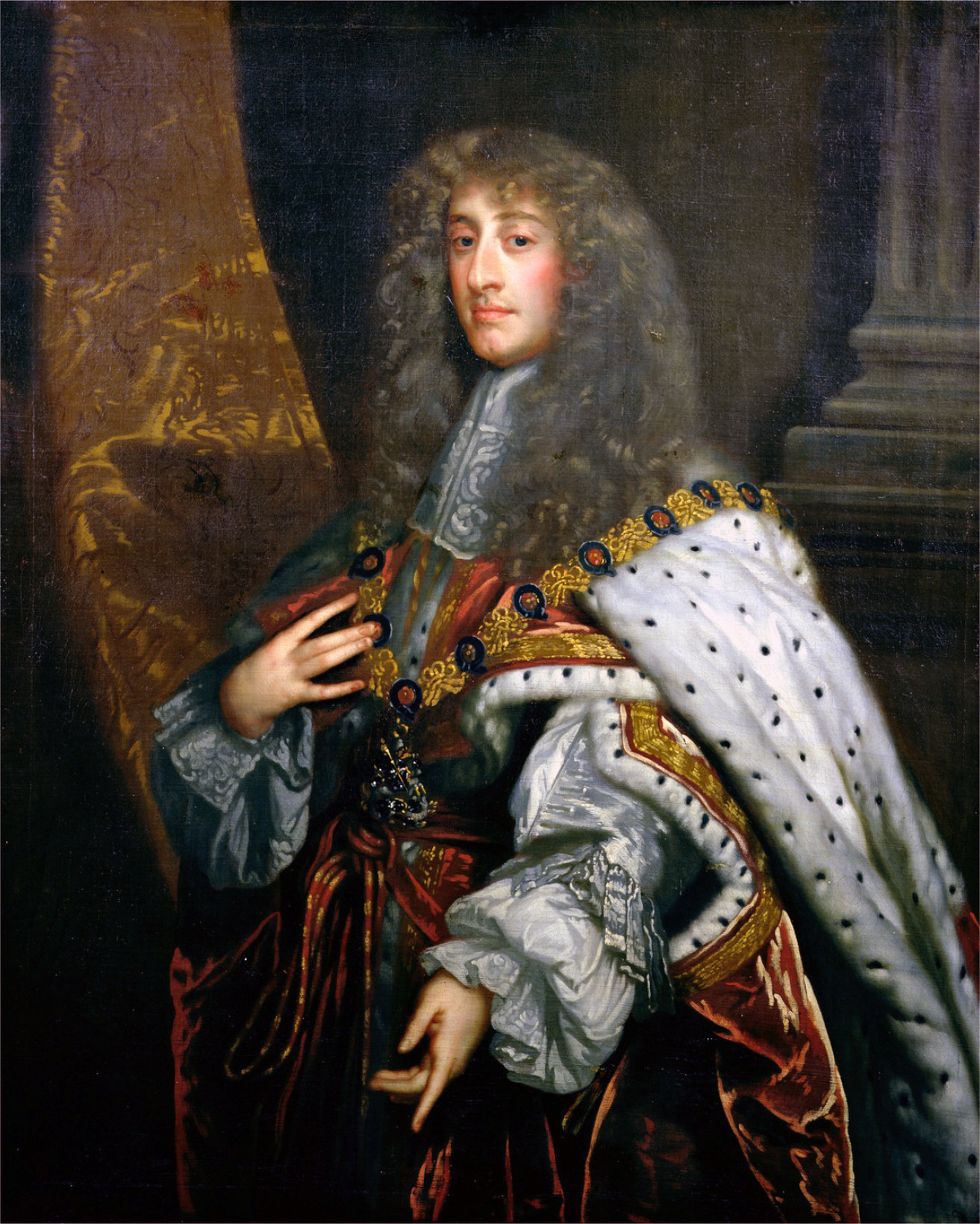
James II of England died 16 September

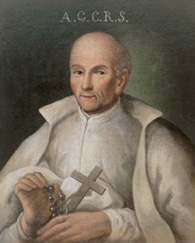
Stanislaus Papczyński died 17 September

- January 3
  - Fernand Palma d'Artois, Vicar Apostolic of Great Mogul and Titular Archbishop of Ancyra (b. 1623)
  - Louis I, Prince of Monaco (b. 1642)
- January 4
  - Luís de Sousa, cardinal (b. 1630)
  - Ernst Rüdiger von Starhemberg, Austrian field marshal (b. 1638)
- January 6 – Toussaint Rose, French writer (b. 1611)
- January 14 – Tokugawa Mitsukuni, Japanese warlord (b. 1628)
- January 17 – Domenico Belisario de Bellis, Roman Catholic prelate, Bishop of Molfetta (1696–1701) (b. 1647)
- January 18 – Sir John Fagg, 1st Baronet, English politician (b. 1627)
- January 27 – James Graham, English born colonial American politician (b. 1650)
- February 10 – Savo Millini, Roman Catholic cardinal (b. 1644)
- February 15 – François de Clermont-Tonnerre, French aristocrat and cleric (b. 1629)
- February 27 – Christiana Oxenstierna, Swedish noble (b. 1661)
- March 15 – Jean Renaud de Segrais, French writer (b. 1624)
- March 19 – John Egerton, 3rd Earl of Bridgewater, English politician (b. 1646)
- March 31 – Thomas van Rhee, Governor of Dutch Ceylon (b. 1634)
- April 2 – Henry Howard, 7th Duke of Norfolk (b. 1655)
- April 4 – Joseph Haines, English entertainer and author
- April 8 – Alexander Sforza, Titular Archbishop of Neocaesarea in Ponto and Apostolic Nuncio to Savoy (b. 1658)
- April 18 – Henry, Prince of Nassau-Dillenburg, (1662–1701) (b. 1641)
- April 21 – Asano Naganori, Japanese warlord (b. 1667)
- April 24 – Fernando de Carvajal y Ribera, Roman Catholic prelate, Archbishop of Santo Domingo (b. 1632)
- May 8
  - Robert Bertie, 3rd Earl of Lindsey, English noble (b. 1630)
  - Jacob de Heusch, Dutch painter (b. 1656)
- May 18 – Niwa Mitsushige, Edo period Japanese samurai, 2nd Niwa daimyō of Shirakawa Domain and the 1st Niwa daimyō of Nihonmatsu Domain (b. 1622)
- May 20
  - Rosine Elisabeth Menthe, morganatic wife of Duke Rudolf August of Brunswick-Wolfenbüttel (b. 1663)
  - Christiana of Schleswig-Holstein-Sonderburg-Glücksburg, duchess consort of Saxe-Merseburg (b. 1634)
- May 23
  - Captain William Kidd, Scottish privateer (b. 1645)
  - Anne Hilarion de Tourville, French naval commander who served under King Louis XIV (b. 1642)
- May 26 – Augusta of Schleswig-Holstein-Sonderburg-Glücksburg, Danish-German princess (b. 1633)
- May 30 – Theophilus Hastings, 7th Earl of Huntingdon, 17th-century English politician and Jacobite (b. 1650)
- June 2
  - Madeleine de Scudéry, French writer (b. 1607)
  - Anna Stanisławska, Polish author and poet known for her sole work (b. 1651)
- June 7 – Charles Cotterell, English courtier (b. 1615)
- June 9 – Philippe I, Duke of Orléans, younger son of Louis XIII of France and his wife (b. 1640)
- June 24 – Ford Grey, 1st Earl of Tankerville (b. 1655)
- July 5 – Pier Matteo Petrucci, Roman Catholic cardinal (b. 1636)
- July 7 – William Stoughton, American judge at the Salem witch trials (b. 1631)
- July 12 – Giovanni Battista Nepita, Bishop of Massa Lubrense and Bishop of Sant'Angelo dei Lombardi e Bisaccia (b. 1624)
- July 14 – Lorenzo Kreutter de Corvinis, Roman Catholic prelate, Bishop of Vieste (1697–1701) (b. 1658)
- July 16 – Justus Danckerts, Dutch artist (b. 1635)
- August 6 – William Hedges, the first governor of the East India Company (b. 1632)
- August 20 – Sir Charles Sedley, 5th Baronet, English playwright (b. 1639)
- August 22 – John Granville, 1st Earl of Bath, English royalist statesman (b. 1628)
- August 31 – Samuel Chappuzeau, French scholar (b. 1625)
- September 4 – Charles Granville, 2nd Earl of Bath, English diplomat (b. 1661)
- September 15 – Edmé Boursault, French writer (b. 1638)
- September 16 – James II of England, King of England and Ireland, and of Scotland (as James VII) (b. 1633)
- September 17 – Stanislaus Papczyński, Polish priest (b. 1631)
- September 19 – Walter Moyle, English politician (b. 1627)
- September 20 – Bernard Granville, courtier of King Charles II and MP (b. 1631)
- September 28 – Johannetta of Sayn-Wittgenstein, German noblewoman (b. 1632)
- October 3 – Joseph Williamson, English politician (b. 1633)
- November 1 – Alexander Stuart, 5th Earl of Moray, Scottish nobleman (b. 1634)
- November 5 – Charles Gerard, 2nd Earl of Macclesfield, French-born English politician (b. c. 1659)
- November 9 – Hui-bin Jang, Korean royal consort (b. 1659)
- November 27 – Maurizio Bertone, Roman Catholic prelate, Bishop of Fossano (1678–1701) (b. 1639)
- November 29 – Carlo Labia, Archbishop (Personal Title) of Adria and Archbishop of Corfù (b. 1624)
- December 2 – Zofia Czarnkowska Opalińska, mother-in-law of King Stanislaus I of Poland (b. 1660)
- December 21 – Sir Hugh Paterson, 1st Baronet, Scottish landowner (b. 1659)

1702

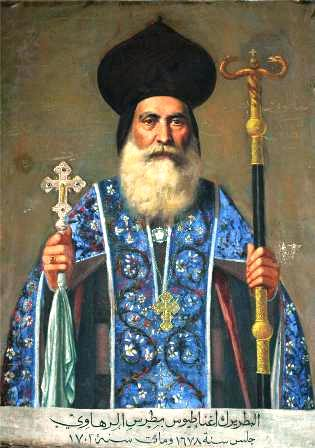
Ignatius Gregory Peter VI Shahbaddin died 4 March

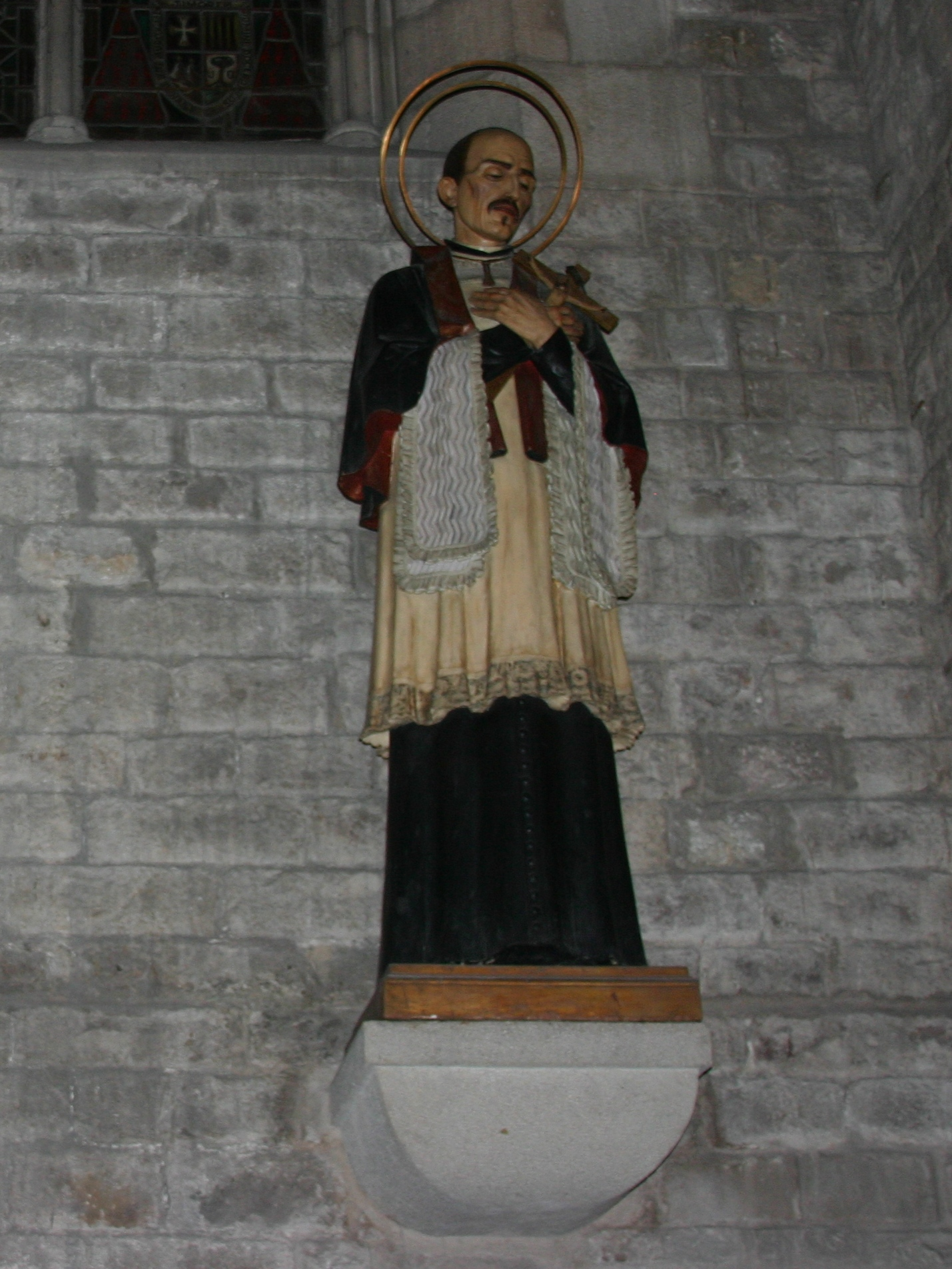
Joseph Oriol died 23 March

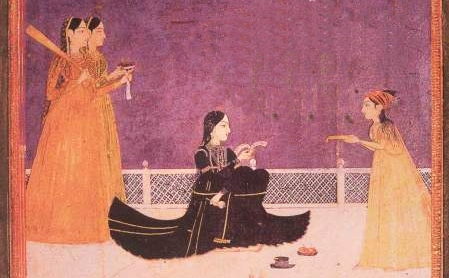
Zeb-un-Nissa died 26 May

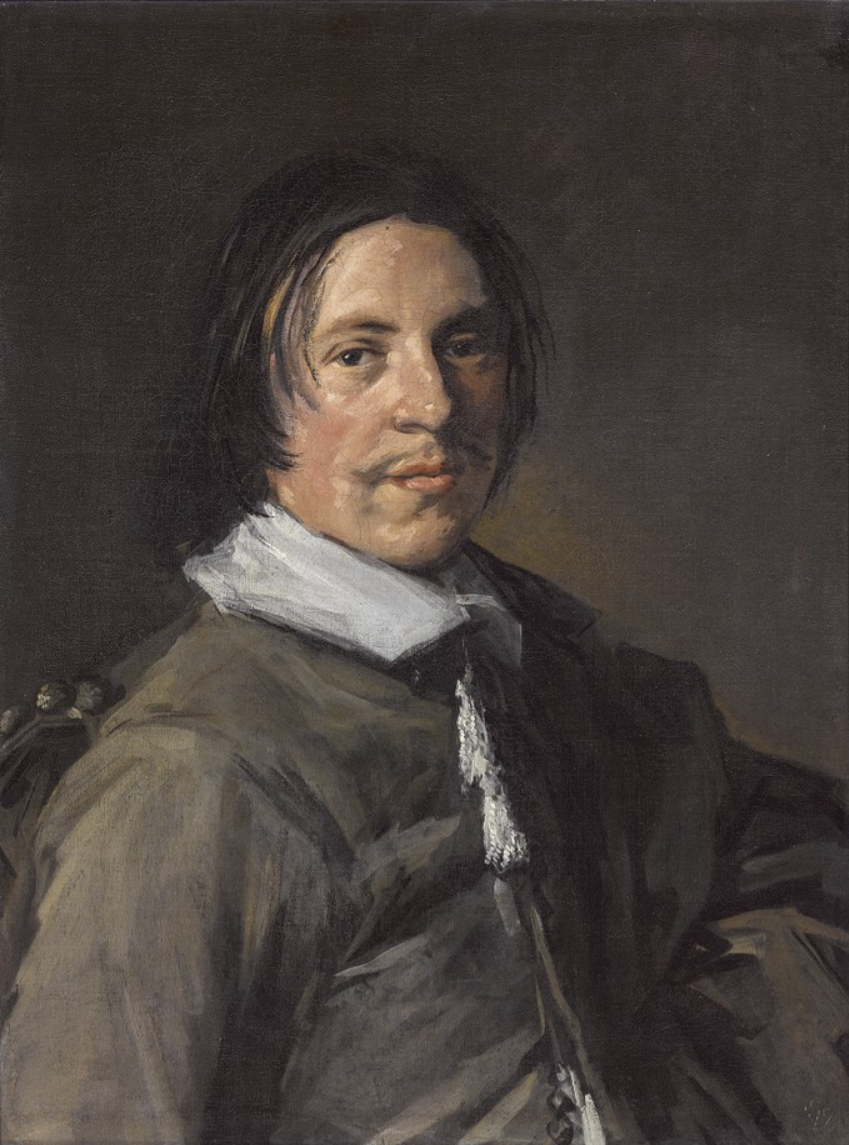
Vincent van der Vinne died 26 July

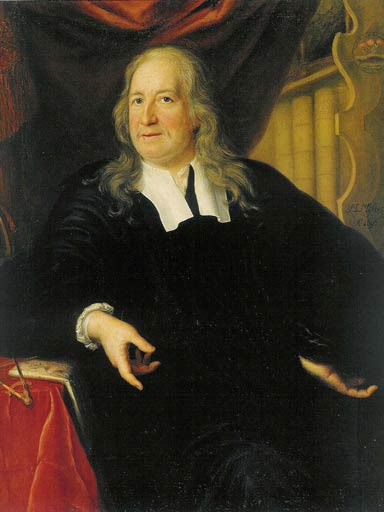
Olaus Rudbeck died 17 September

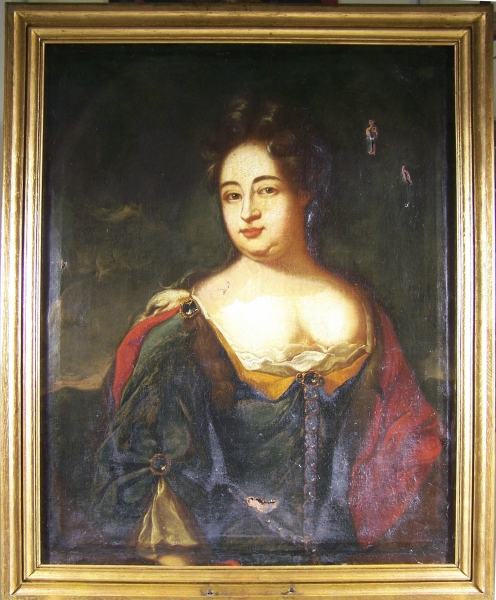
Countess Sophie Henriette of Waldeck died 15 October

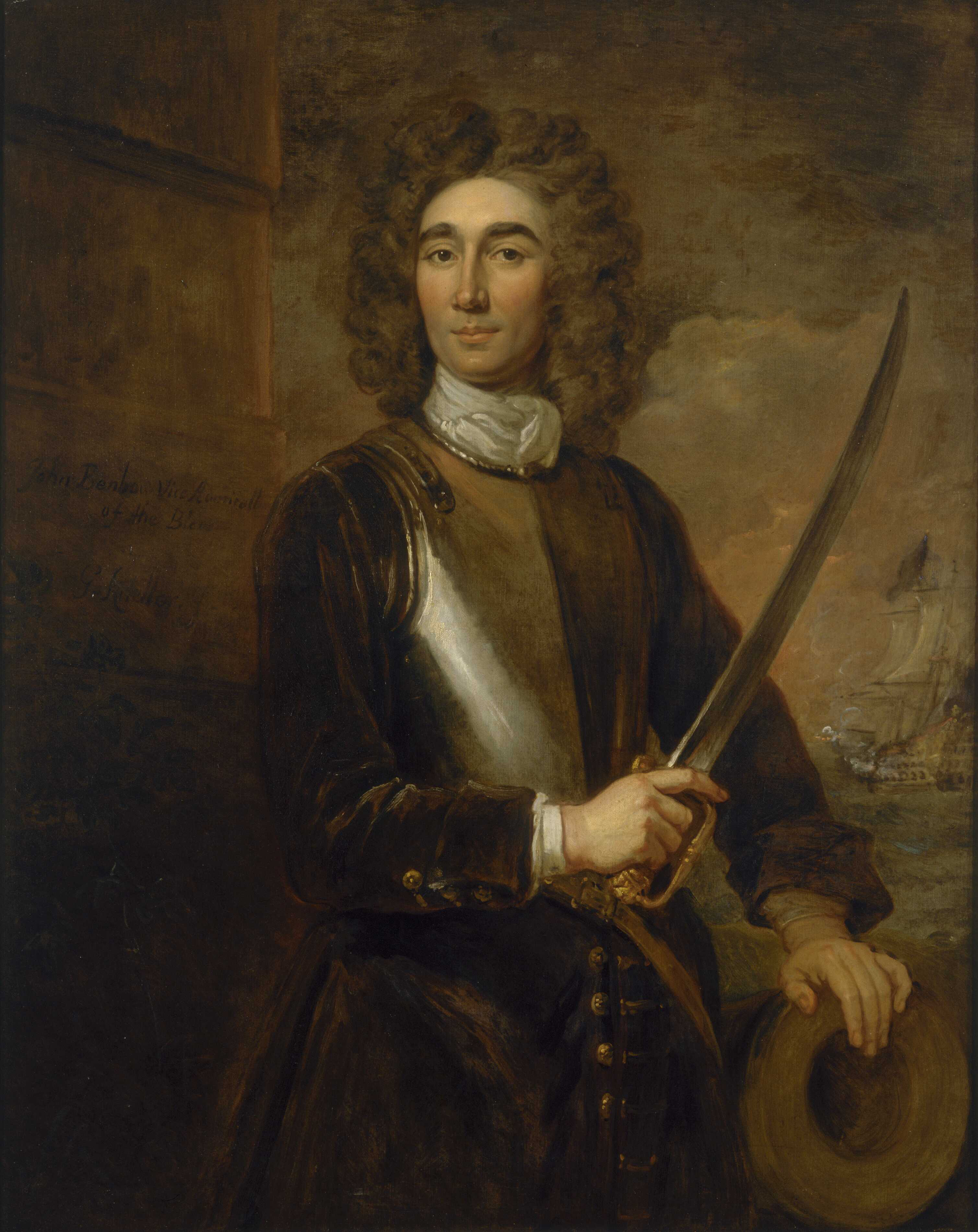
John Benbow died 4 November

- January 2 – Christian Adolf I, Duke of Schleswig-Holstein-Sonderburg-Franzhagen, German nobleman (b. 1641)
- January 7 – Ernst von Trautson, Austrian Roman Catholic clergyman who was Prince-Bishop of Vienna (b. 1633)
- January 17 – Stanisław Herakliusz Lubomirski, Polish noble (b. 1642)
- February 16 – John Milner, English clergyman (b. 1628)
- February 17 – Peder Syv, Danish historian (b. 1631)
- February 27 – Münejjim Bashi, Ottoman astrologer, Sufi, and historian
- March 2 – Giuseppe de Lazzara, Roman Catholic prelate, Bishop of Alife (1676–1702) (b. 1626)
- March 4 – Ignatius Gregory Peter VI Shahbaddin, Patriarch of the Syriac Catholic Church from 1678 to 1702 (b. c. 1641)
- March 8
  - (buried) Jan de Baen, Dutch portrait painter (b. 1633)
  - King William III of England, Scotland and Ireland (b. 1650)
- March 18 – Johannes Rothe, Dutch preacher (b. 1628)
- March 23 – Joseph Oriol, Spanish Catholic priest, saint (b. 1650)
- March 24 – Sir James Clavering, 1st Baronet, English landowner (b. 1620)
- April 2 – Iver Leganger, Norwegian priest, non-fiction writer (b. 1629)
- April 3
  - Sir Henry Goring, 2nd Baronet, English politician (b. 1622)
  - Stanisław Jan Jabłonowski, Polish nobleman (b. 1634)
- April 12 – Paul Mezger, Austrian Benedictine theologian and academic (b. 1637)
- April 20 – Anna Talbot, Countess of Shrewsbury, English countess (b. 1642)
- April 22 – François Charpentier, French archaeologist and man of letters (b. 1620)
- April 23 – Margaret Fell, English Quaker leader (b. 1614)
- April 27
  - Jean Bart, French naval commander and privateer (b. 1650)
  - Emich Christian of Leiningen-Dagsburg, count (b. 1642)
- May 10 – Antonio Gherardi, Italian painter (b. 1638)
- May 14 – Marc Hyacinthe de Rosmadec, French naval officer, appointed governor general of the French Antilles but died before taking office (b. 1635)
- May 17 – Jan Wyck, Dutch military painter (b. 1645)
- May 26 – Zeb-un-Nissa, Mughal princess and poet, imprisoned by her father for the last 20 years of her life (b. 1638)
- May 27 – Dominique Bouhours, French critic (b. 1628)
- June 1 – François Provost, career soldier from France who served in New France in 1665 (b. 1638)
- June 2 – John Moore, Member of Parliament for the City of London (b. 1620)
- June 7 – Benedetto Giacinto Sangermano, Roman Catholic prelate, Bishop of Nusco (1680–1702) (b. 1638)
- June 20
  - John Leyburn, English Roman Catholic bishop, Vicar Apostolic of England (b. 1615)
  - Ippolito Vicentini, Roman Catholic prelate, Bishop of Rieti (1670–1702) (b. 1638)
- July 12 – Nanbu Shigenobu, Edo period Japanese samurai (b. 1616)
- July 19 – Frederick IV, Duke of Holstein-Gottorp (b. 1671)
- July 26 – Vincent van der Vinne, Dutch Mennonite painter (b. 1628)
- August 1 – Sir William Courtenay, 1st Baronet, English politician (b. 1628)
- August 8 – Callinicus II of Constantinople, Ecumenical Patriarch of Constantinople (b. 1630)
- August 14 – Louis Thomas, Count of Soissons and Prince of Savoy (b. 1657)
- August 15 – Charles, Prince of Commercy, French field marshal (b. 1661)
- September 11 – Sir Robert Southwell, English diplomat (b. 1635)
- September 12 – Alfonso Basilio Ghetaldo, Roman Catholic prelate, Bishop of Stagno (1694–1702) (b. 1647)
- September 17 – Olaus Rudbeck, Swedish architect (b. 1630)
- September 20 – William Campion, English politician (b. 1640)
- September 28 – Robert Spencer, 2nd Earl of Sunderland, English statesman (b. 1641)
- October 14 – Franz Anton, Count of Hohenzollern-Haigerloch (b. 1657)
- October 15
  - Frances Stewart, Duchess of Richmond, famous for refusing to become a mistress of Charles II of England (b. 1647)
  - Countess Sophie Henriette of Waldeck, Duchess of Saxe-Hildburghausen (b. 1662)
- October 16 – Francesco Casati, Roman Catholic prelate, Titular Archbishop of Trapezus (1670–1702) (b. 1620)
- October 17
  - François Genet, Roman Catholic prelate, Bishop of Vaison (1686–1702) (b. 1640)
  - Walrad, Prince of Nassau-Usingen, German prince and founder of the line of Nassau-Usingen (b. 1636)
- October 22 – Guy Aldonce de Durfort de Lorges, French noble and soldier (b. 1630)
- October 27 – Niccolò Radulovich, Roman Catholic cardinal (b. 1627)
- November 2 – Andrés de las Navas y Quevedo, Roman Catholic prelate, Bishop of Santiago de Guatemala (1682–1702) (b. 1632)
- November 4 – John Benbow, English officer in the Royal Navy (b. 1653)
- November 5 – William Stanley, 9th Earl of Derby (b. 1655)
- November 13 – Dudley Bradstreet, American magistrate, Justice of the Peace of Andover (b. 1648)
- November 26 – Gerrit de Heere, Governor of Dutch Ceylon during its Dutch period (b. 1657)
- November 29 – Nanbu Yukinobu, early to mid-Edo period Japanese samurai (b. 1642)
- December 8
  - Christopher Comstock, early settler of Norwalk (b. 1635)
  - Philippe, Chevalier de Lorraine, French nobleman and member of the House of Guise (b. 1643)
  - Bartolomeo Riberi, Roman Catholic prelate, Bishop of Nicotera (1691–1702) (b. 1640)
- December 16 – Henry FitzJames, illegitimate son of King James II of England and VII of Scotland by Arabella Churchill (b. 1673)
- December 26 – Fitton Gerard, 3rd Earl of Macclesfield, English politician, earl (b. 1663)

1703

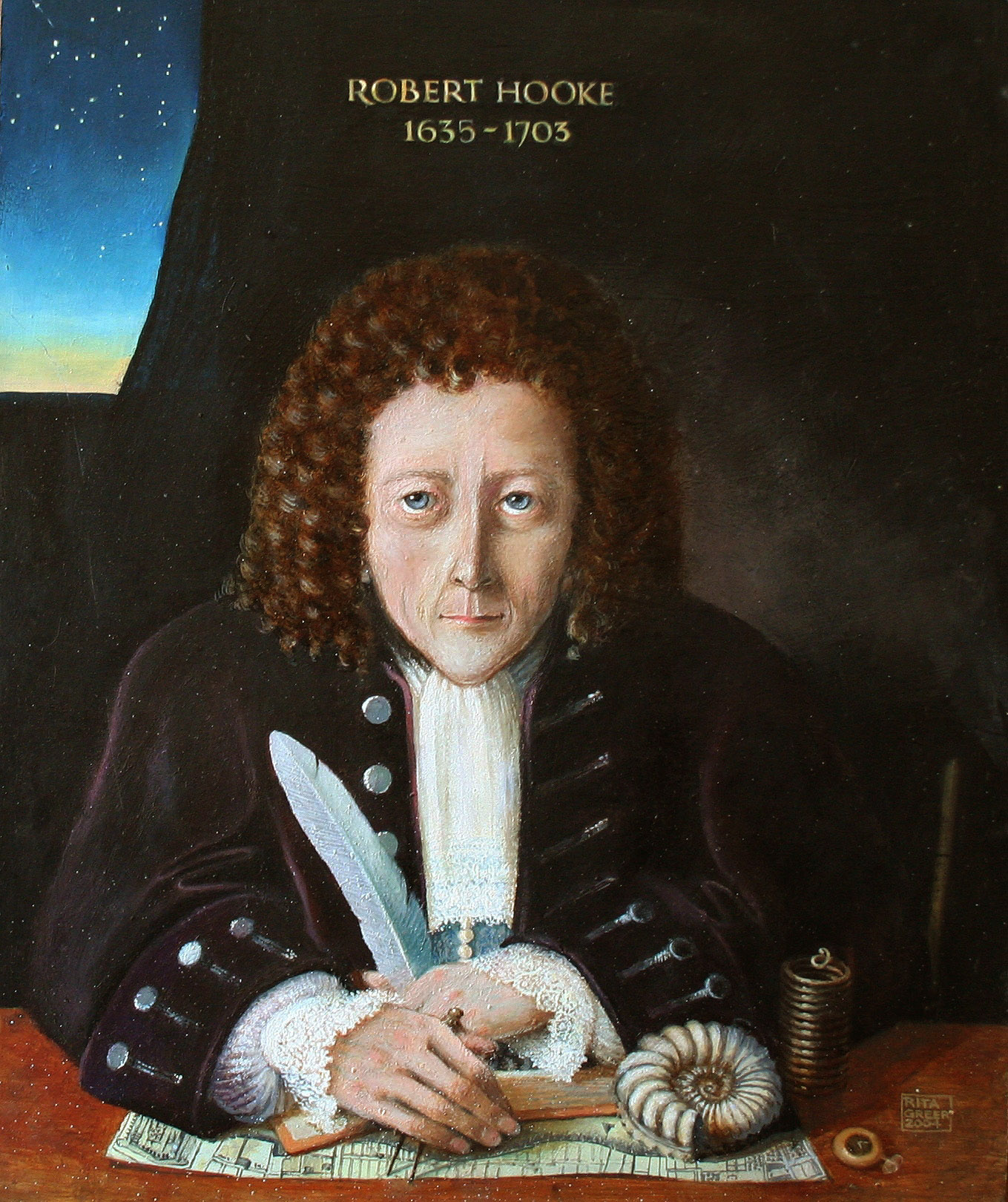
Robert Hooke

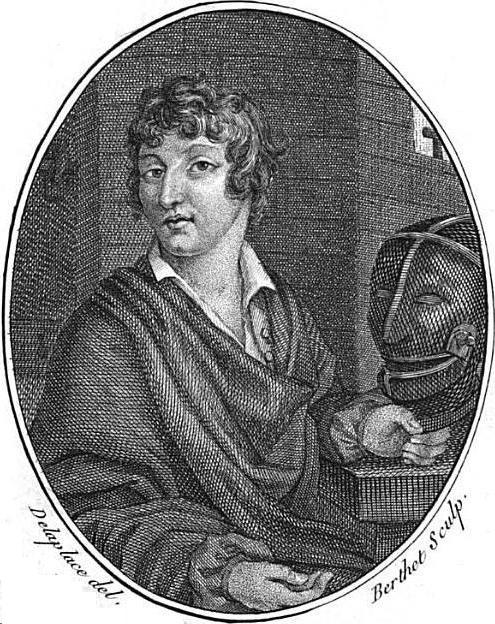
Man in the Iron Mask

- January 9 – Úrsula Micaela Morata, Spanish writer (b. 1628)
- January 11 – Johann Georg Graevius, German classical scholar and critic (b. 1632)
- January 16 – Erik Dahlbergh, Swedish engineer, soldier and field marshal (b. 1625)
- February 5 – Phetracha, king of Ayutthaya (b. 1632)
- February 15 – Robert Kerr, 1st Marquess of Lothian (b. 1636)
- February 18
  - Thomas Hyde, English orientalist (b. 1636)
  - Ilona Zrínyi, Hungarian heroine (b. 1643)
- February 20 – John Churchill, Marquess of Blandford, British noble (b. 1686)
- February 28 – Sir Roger Twisden, 2nd Baronet of England (b. 1640)
- March 3 – Robert Hooke, English scientist (b. 1635)
- March 12 – Aubrey de Vere, 20th Earl of Oxford (b. 1627)
- March 31 – Johann Christoph Bach, German composer (b. 1642)
- April 1 – Thomas Jermyn, 2nd Baron Jermyn, Governor of Jersey (b. 1633)
- April 20 – Lancelot Addison, English royal chaplain (b. 1632)
- May 3 – Sir Richard Howe, 2nd Baronet, English Member of Parliament (b. 1621)
- May 6 – John Murray, 1st Marquess of Atholl (b. 1631)
- May 16 – Charles Perrault, French author (b. 1628)
- May 26
  - Louis-Hector de Callière, French politician (b. 1648)
  - Samuel Pepys, English civil servant and diarist (b. 1633)
- June 14 – Jean Herauld Gourville, French adventurer (b. 1625)
- June 19 – William Stanhope, English politician (b. 1626)
- July 17 – Roemer Vlacq I, Dutch naval captain (b. 1637)
- July 20
  - Changning, prince during the Qing dynasty (b. 1657)
  - Statz Friedrich von Fullen, German-born nobleman (b. 1638)
- August 10 – Fuquan (prince), Chinese Qing dynasty prince (b. 1653)
- August 21 – Thomas Tryon, British hat maker (b. 1634)
- September 22 – Vincenzo Viviani, Italian mathematician and scientist (b. 1622)
- September 25 – Archibald Campbell, 1st Duke of Argyll, Scottish privy councillor (b. 1658)
- September 29 – Charles de Saint-Évremond, French soldier (b. 1610)
- September 30 – Walter J. Johnson, English explorer, fur trader (b. 1611)
- October 3 – Alessandro Melani, Italian composer (b. 1639)
- October 5 – Anthony Ettrick, English politician (b. 1622)
- October 8 – Tomás Marín de Poveda, 1st Marquis of Cañada Hermosa, Royal Governor of Chile (b. 1650)
- October 11 – Roger Cave, English politician (b. 1655)
- October 14 – Thomas Kingo, Danish bishop (b. 1634)
- October 28 – John Wallis, English mathematician (b. 1616)
- November 19 – The Man in the Iron Mask, French prisoner (identity unknown)
- November 27 – Henry Winstanley, English engineer (b. 1644)
- November 30 – Nicolas de Grigny, French organist and composer (b. 1672)
- December 28 – Mustafa II, Ottoman Sultan (b. 1664)
- date unknown – Anastasiya Dabizha, princess of Moldavia and Wallachia and Hetmana of Ukraine.

1704

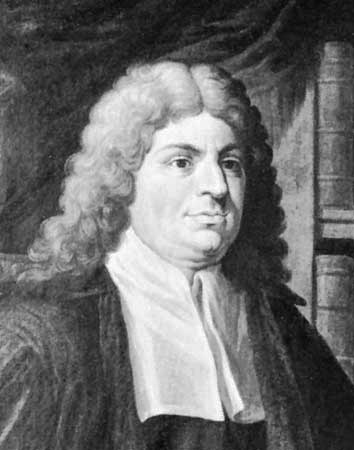
Lorenzo Bellini died 8 January

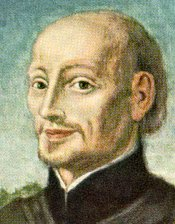
Johann Philipp Jeningen died 8 February

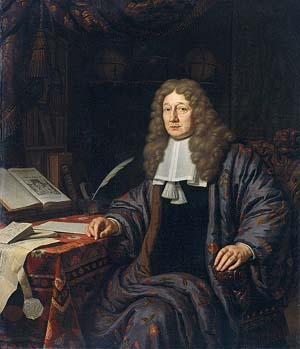
Johannes Hudde died 15 April

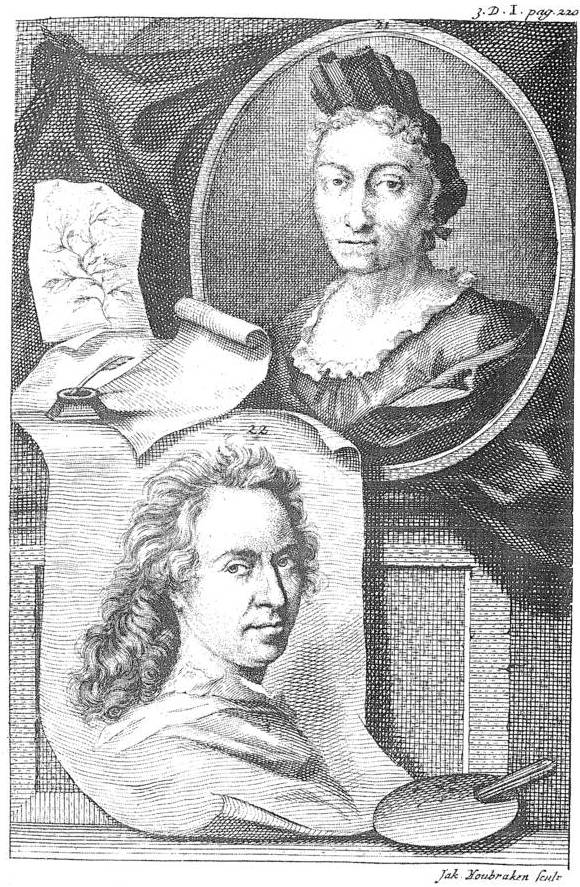
David van der Plas died 18 May

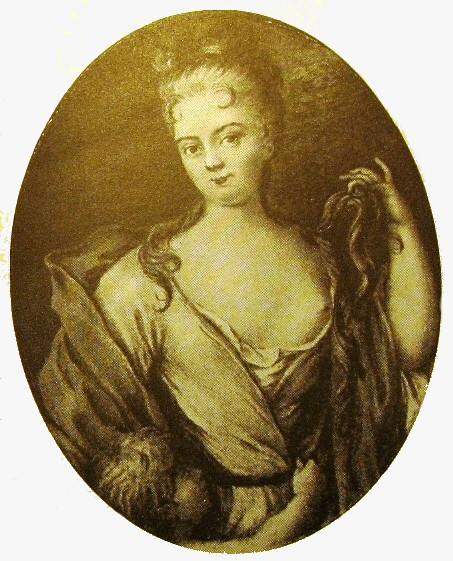
Elisabeth Helene von Vieregg died 27 June

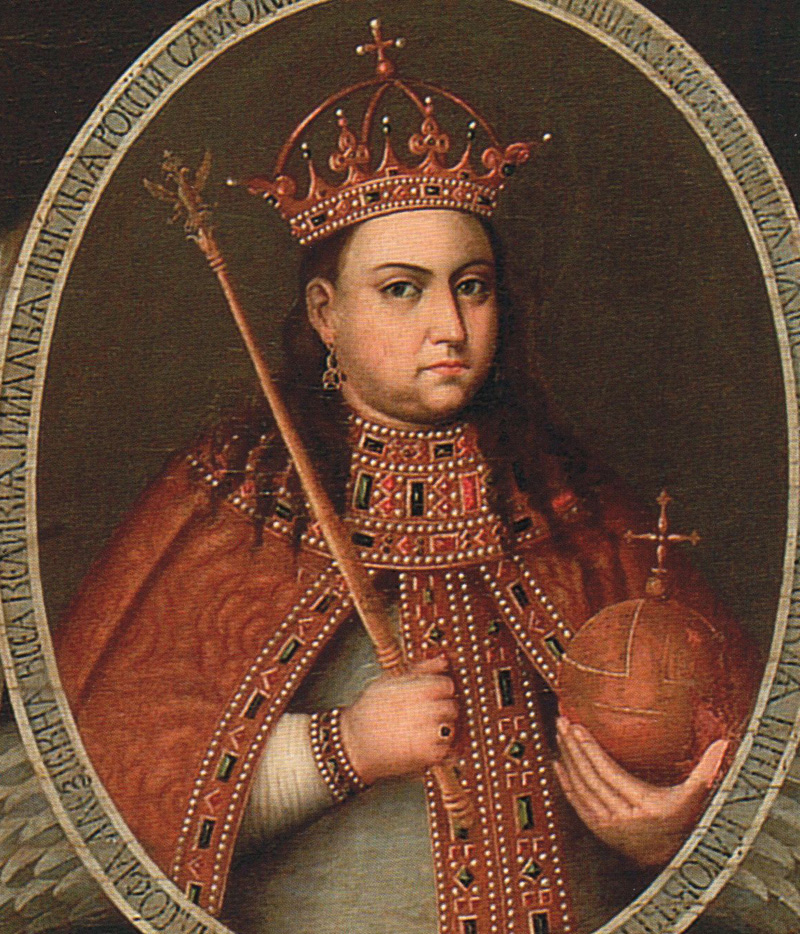
Sophia Alekseyevna of Russia died 14 July

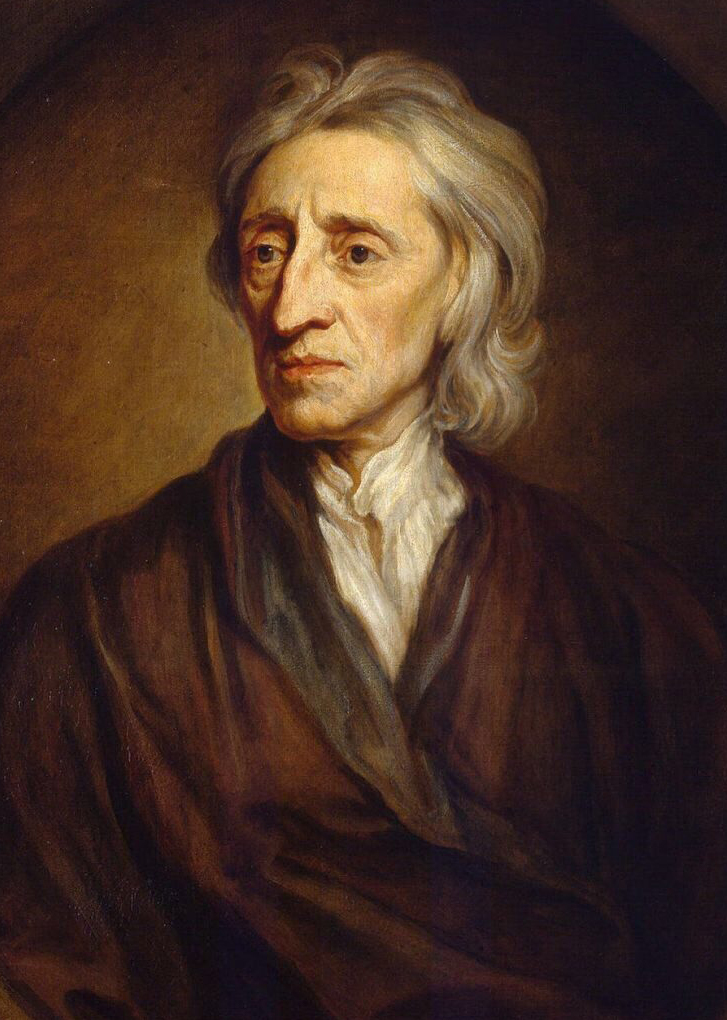
John Locke died 28 October

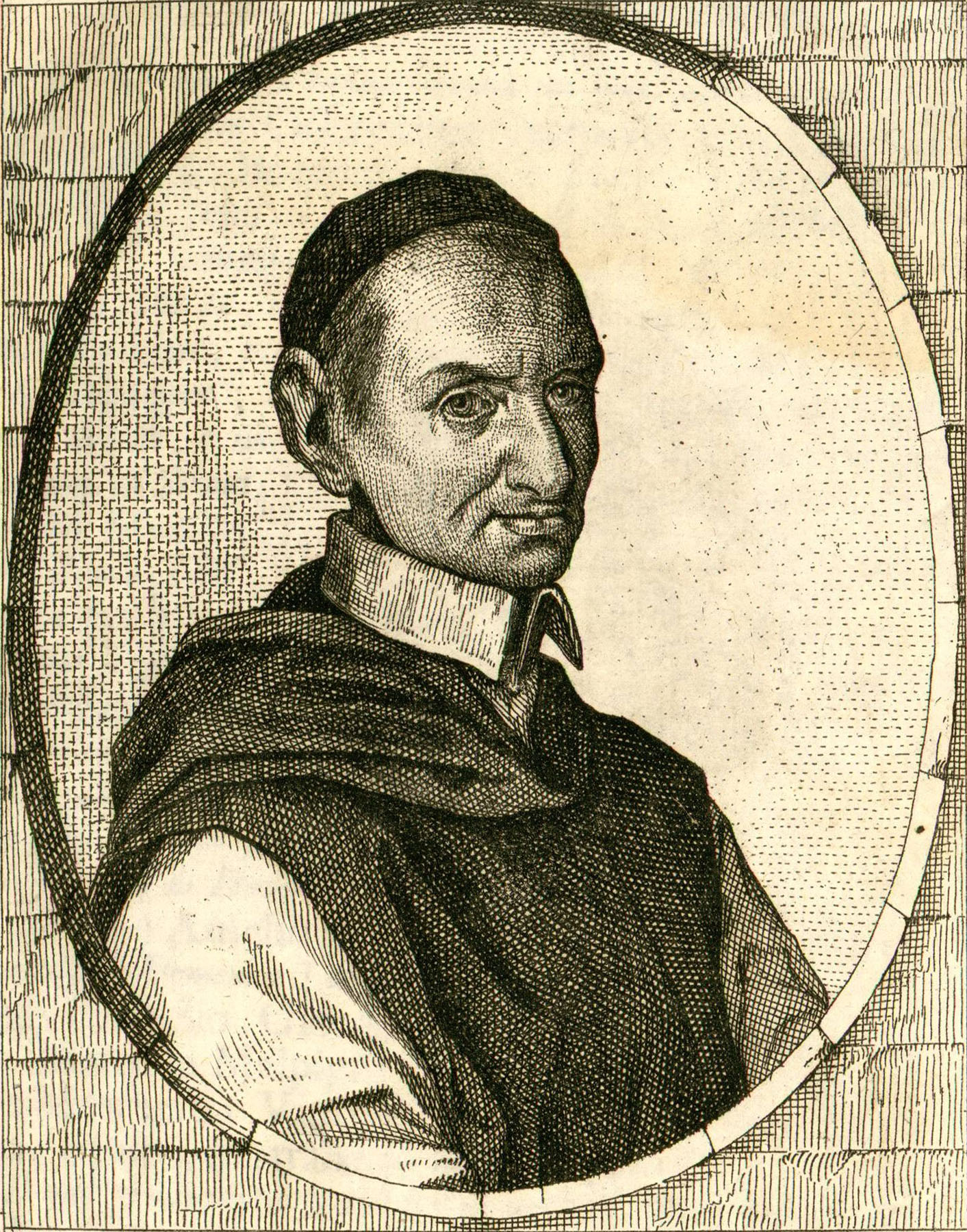
Paolo Boccone died 22 December

- January 4 – Giambattista Spinola, Italo-Spanish Catholic cardinal (b. 1615)
- January 8 – Lorenzo Bellini, Italian physician, anatomist (b. 1643)
- January 21
  - Francisco de la Puebla González, Roman Catholic prelate who served as Bishop of Santiago de Chile (1694–1704) (b. 1643)
  - Willem Bastiaensz Schepers, Dutch admiral (b. 1619)
- January 26 – Rudolph Augustus, Duke of Braunschweig-Wolfenbüttel (b. 1627)
- February 2 – Guillaume François Antoine, Marquis de l'Hôpital, French mathematician (b. 1661)
- February 8 – Johann Philipp Jeningen, German Roman Catholic priest from Eichstätt in Bavaria (b. 1642)
- February 18 – Johann Philipp d'Arco (b. 1652)
- February 21 – John Charles, Count Palatine of Gelnhausen, German prince, ancestor of the cadet branch of the royal family of Bavaria (b. 1638)
- February 23
  - Steven Blankaart, Dutch entomologist (b. 1650)
  - Georg Muffat, German composer (b. 1645)
  - Henry Noris, Italian Catholic cardinal (b. 1631)
- February 24 – Marc-Antoine Charpentier, French composer (b. 1643)
- February 25 – Isabella Leonarda, Italian composer (b. 1620)
- March 1 – Joseph Parrocel, French Baroque painter (b. 1646)
- March 6 – Giuseppe Cei, Roman Catholic prelate who served as Bishop of Cortona (1695–1704) (b. 1640)
- March 16 – Deane Winthrop, 6th son of Governor John Winthrop (b. 1623)
- March 17 – Menno van Coehoorn, Dutch military engineer (b. 1641)
- March 31 – Christian Stockfleth, Norwegian civil servant and diplomat (b. 1639)
- April 5 – Christian Ulrich I, Duke of Württemberg-Oels, German nobleman (b. 1652)
- April 8
  - Hiob Ludolf, German orientalist (b. 1624)
  - Henry Sydney, 1st Earl of Romney, English politician and army officer (b. 1641)
- April 10 – Wilhelm Egon von Fürstenberg, Bishop of Strassburg (b. 1629)
- April 12 – Jacques-Bénigne Bossuet, French bishop and theologian (b. 1627)
- April 14
  - Thomas Fitch, founding settler of Norwalk, Connecticut (b. 1612)
  - Henderson Walker, Acting Deputy Governor of North Carolina from 1699 to 1704 (b. 1659)
- April 15 – Johannes Hudde, Dutch mathematician and mayor of Amsterdam (b. 1628)
- April 17 – Ulrik Frederik Gyldenløve, leading Norwegian general during the Scanian War (b. 1638)
- April 20 – Agnes Block, Dutch horticulturalist (b. 1629)
- May 3
  - Heinrich Ignaz Franz Biber, Austrian composer (b. 1644)
  - Estephan El Douaihy, Lebanese Maronite Patriarch, historian (b. 1630)
- May 8 – Sir John Cordell, 3rd Baronet, English politician who sat in the House of Commons in 1701 (b. 1677)
- May 12 – Charles Thomas, Prince of Vaudémont (b. 1670)
- May 13 – Louis Bourdaloue, French Jesuit preacher (b. 1632)
- May 15 – Francis Pigott, English Baroque composer and organist (b. 1665)
- May 18 – David van der Plas, Dutch Golden Age portrait painter (b. 1647)
- May 30 – Emmanuel Lebrecht, Prince of Anhalt-Köthen, German prince of the House of Ascania, ruler of Anhalt-Köthen (b. 1671)
- June 13 – Arthur Rose, Scottish minister (b. 1634)
- June 15 – Anna Eriksdotter becomes the last person to be executed for Witchcraft in Sweden. (b. 1624)
- June 18 – Tom Brown, English satirist (b. 1662)
- June 27 – Elisabeth Helene von Vieregg (b. 1679)
- June 30 – John Quelch, English pirate who had a lucrative but very brief career of about one year (b. 1666)
- July 2 – John Adolphus, Duke of Schleswig-Holstein-Sonderburg-Plön (b. 1634)
- July 3 – Sofia Alekseyevna of Russia, regent (b. 1657)
- July 7 – Pierre-Charles Le Sueur, French fur trader and explorer (b. c. 1657)
- July 14 – Sophia Alekseyevna of Russia (b. 1657)
- July 17 – Juan Manuel Mercadillo, Roman Catholic prelate who served as Bishop of Córdoba (1695–1704) (b. 1643)
- July 18 – Benjamin Keach, English Particular Baptist preacher (b. 1640)
- July 20 – Peregrine White, first English child born in the Massachusetts Bay Colony (b. 1620)
- July 28 – Juan de Porras y Atienza, Roman Catholic prelate, Bishop of Coria (1684–1704) and Bishop of Ceuta (1681–1684) (b. 1627)
- August 11 – Francis Barlow, English painter (b. c. 1626)
- August 14 – Roland Laporte, French Protestant leader (b. 1675)
- August 19 – Jane Leade, English Christian mystic (b. 1624)
- September 6 – Francesco Provenzale, Italian Baroque composer and teacher (b. 1624)
- September 21 – Maria Antonia Scalera Stellini, 17th-century Italian poet and playwright (b. 1634)
- September 23 – Alessandro Croce, Roman Catholic prelate who served as Bishop of Cremona (1697–1704) (b. 1650)
- October 2 – Carlo Barberini, Italian Catholic cardinal and member of the Barberini family (b. 1630)
- October 28
  - John Locke, English philosopher (b. 1632)
  - Goodwin Wharton, British politician (b. 1653)
- October 30 – Princess Frederica Amalia of Denmark, daughter of King Frederick III of Denmark (b. 1649)
- November 1 – John Louis I, Prince of Anhalt-Dornburg, German prince of the House of Ascania (b. 1656)
- November 4 – Andreas Acoluthus, German orientalist (b. 1654)
- November 8 – Tommaso Guzzoni, Roman Catholic prelate who served as Bishop of Sora (1681–1702) (b. 1632)
- November 16 – Chikka Devaraja, fourteenth maharaja of the Kingdom of Mysore from 1673 to 1704 (b. 1645)
- November 20 – Charles Plumier, French botanist (b. 1646)
- November 28 – Countess Palatine Magdalena Claudia of Zweibrücken-Birkenfeld-Bischweiler, daughter of the Count Palatine Christian II (b. 1668)
- December 1 – Joan Huydecoper II, Dutch mayor (b. 1625)
- December 4 – William Byrd I, native of Shadwell (b. 1652)
- December 5 – Louis Hennepin, Roman Catholic priest, missionary of the Franciscan Recollet Order (French (b. 1626)
- December 11 – Roger L'Estrange, English pamphleteer, author (b. 1616)
- December 13 – Gábor Esterházy, Hungarian imperial general and noble (b. 1673)
- December 22
  - Paolo Boccone, Italian botanist from Sicily (b. 1633)
  - Selim I Giray, four times khan of the Crimean Khanate (b. 1631)
- December 27 – Hans Albrecht von Barfus, field marshal in the service of Brandenburg and Prussia (b. 1635)

1705

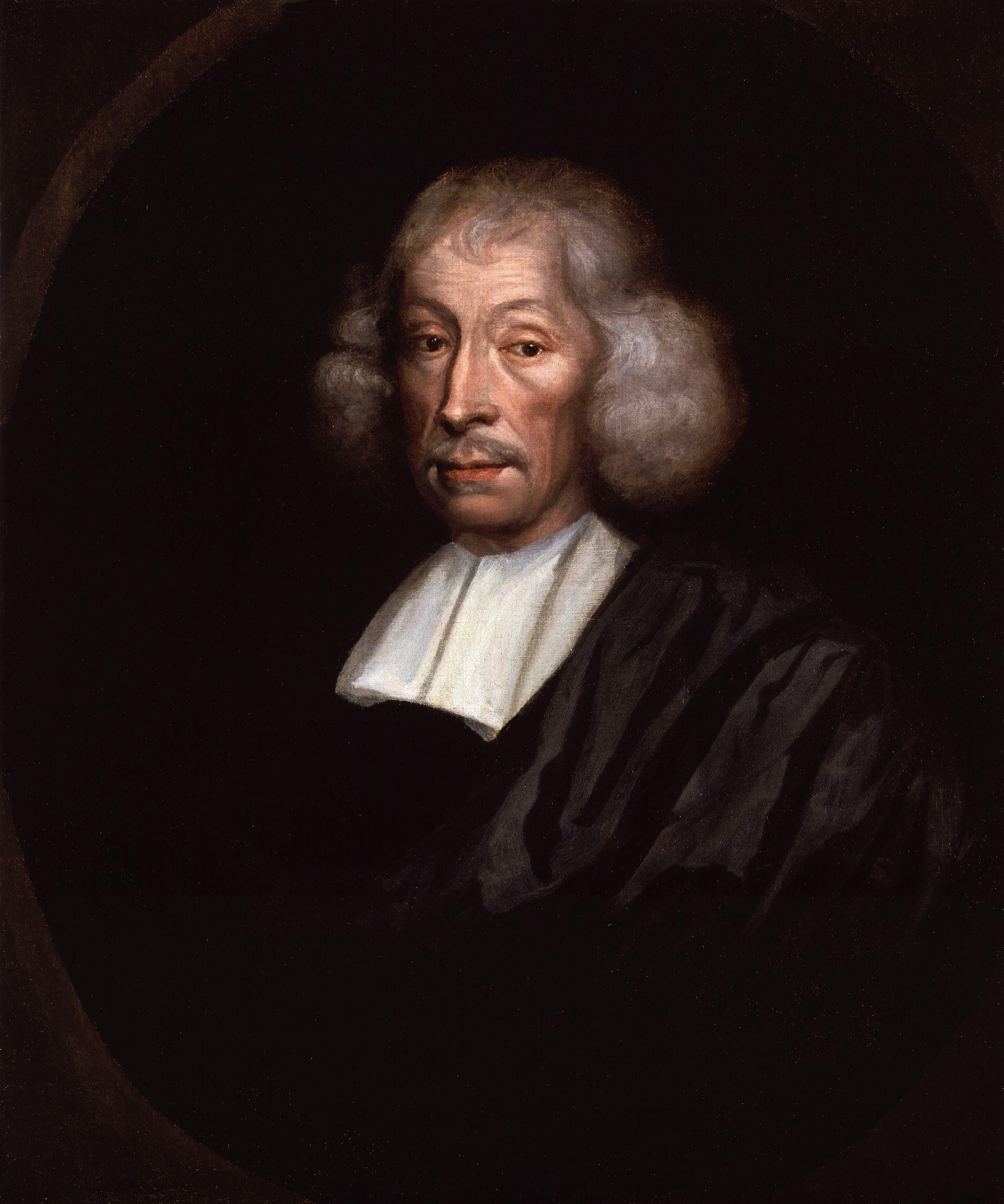
John Ray died 17 January

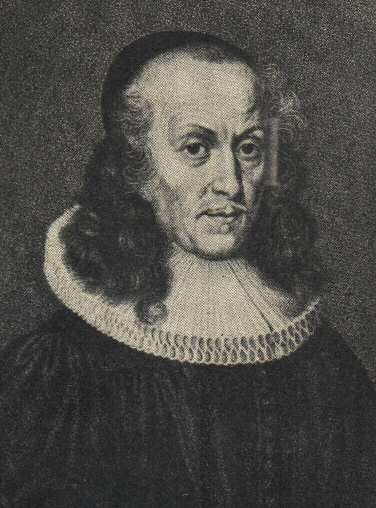
Philipp Spener died 5 February

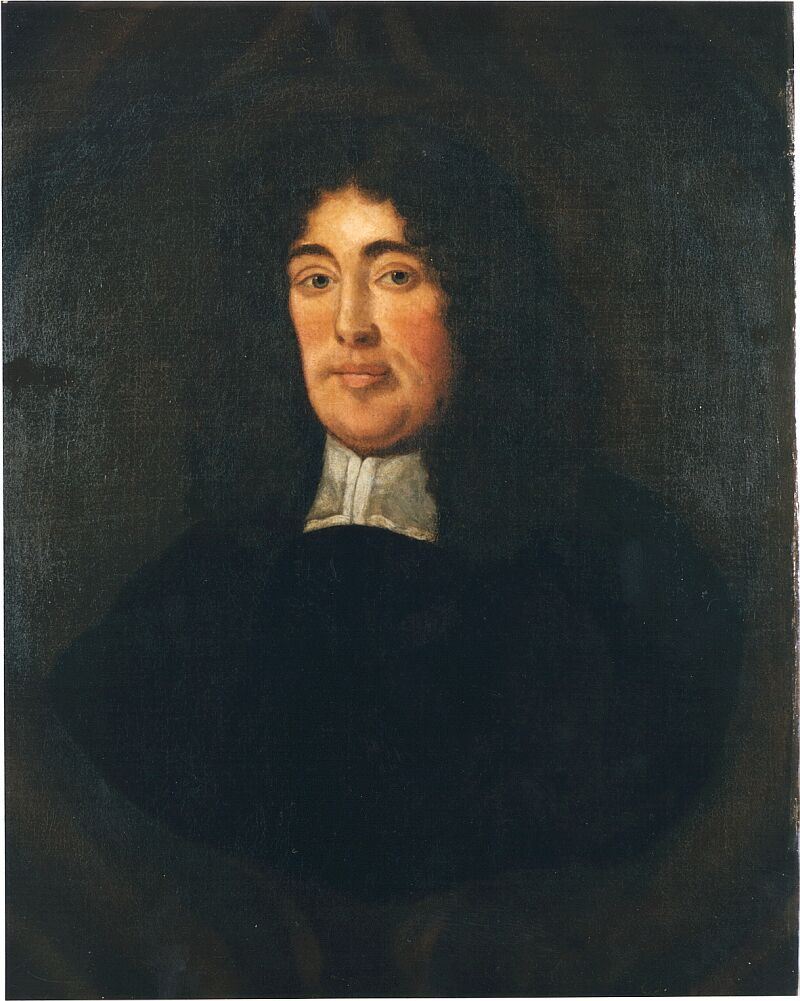
Titus Oates died 13 July

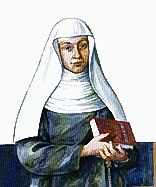
Maria Hueber died 31 July

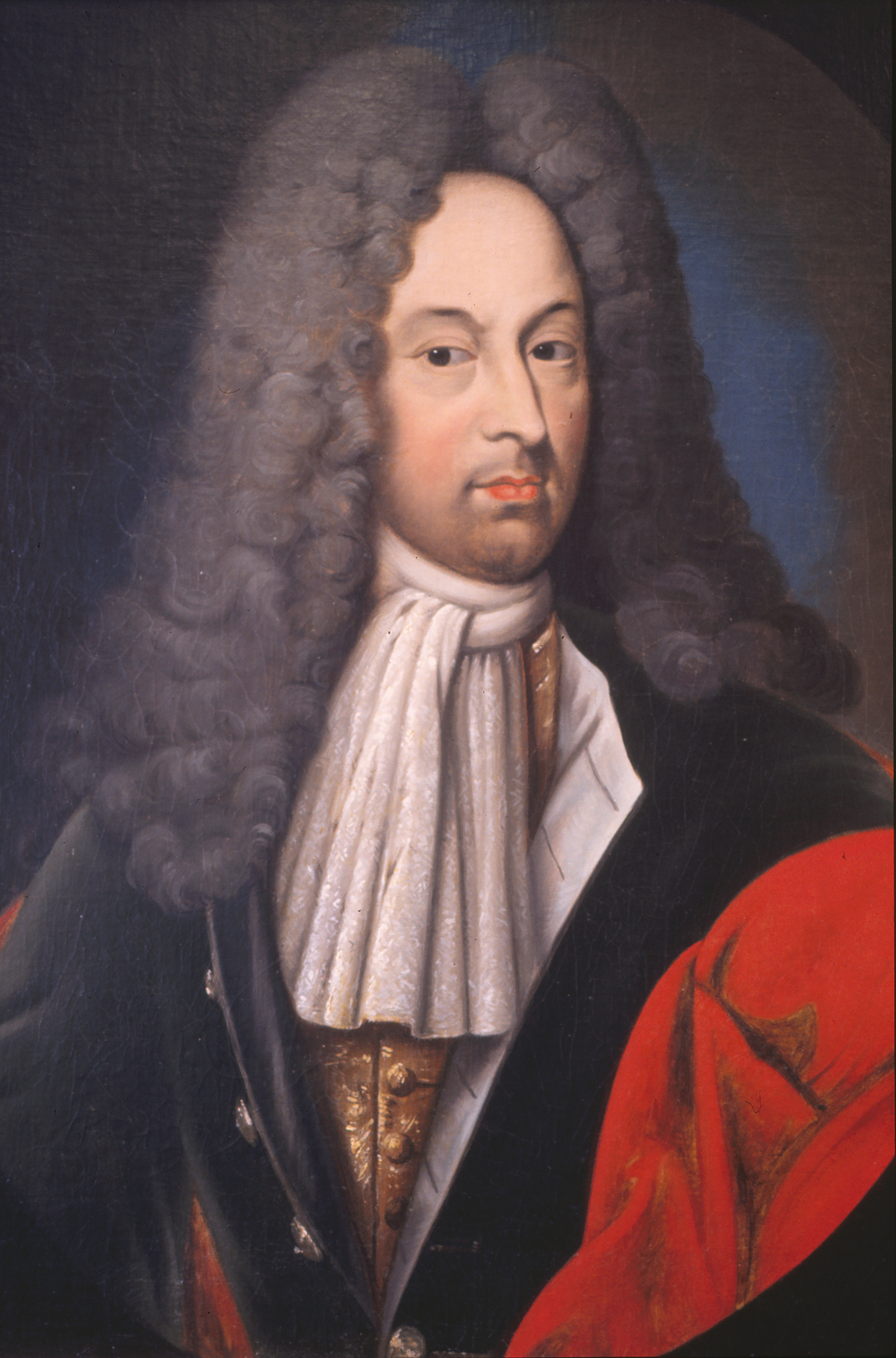
Albert Angell died 13 September

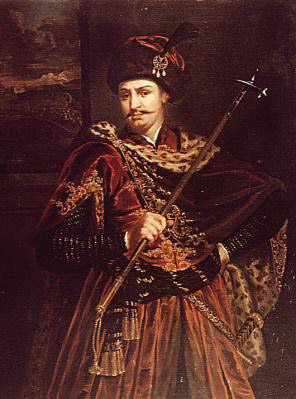
Emeric Thököly died 13 September

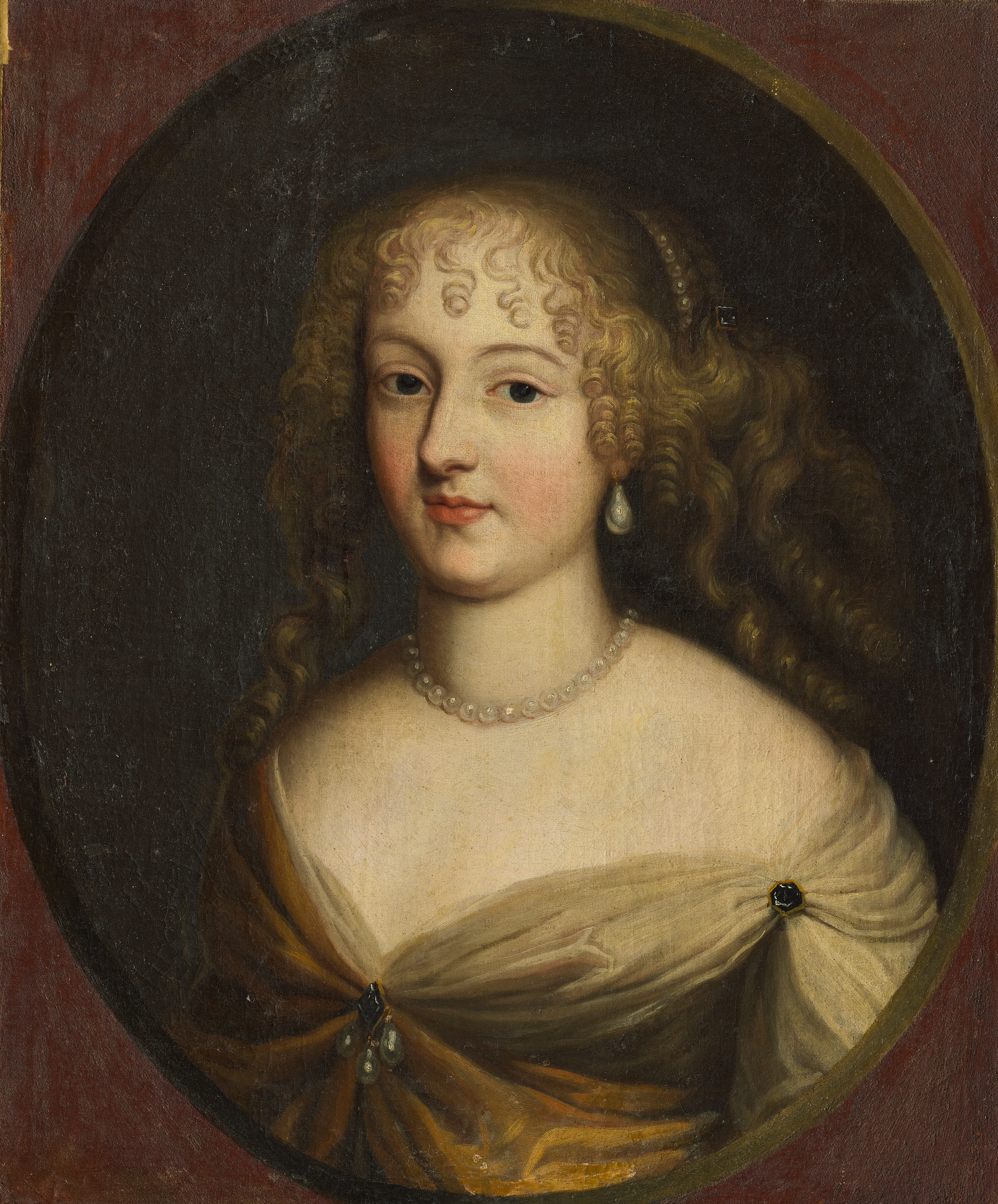
Ninon de l'Enclos died 17 October

- January 7 – Giovanni Battista Spínola, Roman Catholic prelate, Archbishop of Genoa (1694–1705) (b. 1625)
- January 10 – Johannes van Haensbergen, Dutch Golden Age painter (b. 1642)
- January 12 – Luca Giordano, Italian artist (b. 1634)
- January 14 – Madame d'Aulnoy (b. 1650)
- January 17 – John Ray, English naturalist (b. 1627)
- January 21 – Claude-François Ménestrier, French heraldist, Jesuit, courtier (b. 1631)
- February 1 – Sophia Charlotte of Hanover, first Queen consort in Prussia as wife of King Frederick I (b. 1668)
- February 5 – Philipp Spener, German Christian theologian known as the Father of Pietism (b. 1635)
- February 13 – Charles Auger, French colonial administrator (b. 1644)
- February 15 – Jean-Baptiste de Gennes (b. 1656)
- February 18 – William "Tangier" Smith, Moroccan mayor (b. 1655)
- March 10 – John Temple, Irish politician (b. 1632)
- March 13 – Curt Christoph von Koppelow (b. 1624)
- March 22 – Christian Heinrich Postel, German jurist (b. 1658)
- April 2 – John Howe, English Puritan theologian (b. 1630)
- April 5 – Itō Jinsai, Japanese philosopher (b. 1627)
- April 6 – Odoardo Cibo, Roman Catholic prelate and Titular Patriarch of Constantinople (1689–1705) (b. 1619)
- April 17 – Uldericus Nardi, Roman Catholic prelate and Bishop of Bagnoregio (1698–1705) (b. 1637)
- May 5
  - Johann Ernst Glück, German theologian, translator (b. 1652)
  - Leopold I, Holy Roman Emperor (b. 1640)
- June 10 – Michael Wigglesworth, Puritan minister (b. 1631)
- July 5 – Alonso Antonio de San Martín, Roman Catholic prelate, Bishop of Cuenca (1681–1705) and Bishop of Oviedo (1675–1681) (b. 1642)
- July 13 – Titus Oates, English priest who fabricated the "Popish Plot" (b. 1649)
- July 27 – Elizabeth Wilbraham (b. 1632)
- July 30 – Nathaniel Felton, landowner in the Massachusetts Bay Colony and served as a juryman (b. 1615)
- July 31
  - Lucio Borghesi, Roman Catholic prelate, Bishop of Chiusi (1682–1705) (b. 1642)
  - Maria Hueber, Catholic nun (b. 1653)
- August 6 – Johann Ferdinand of Auersperg, second Prince of Auersperg and Duke of Silesia-Münsterberg from 1677 until his death (b. 1655)
- August 13 – Françoise-Marguerite de Sévigné, French aristocrat (b. 1646)
- August 16 – Jacob Bernoulli, Swiss mathematician (b. 1654)
- August 28
  - Ludvig Stoud, Danish-Norwegian theologian and priest (b. 1649)
  - George William, Duke of Brunswick-Lüneburg (b. 1624)
- September 2 – Giacinto Camillo Maradei, Roman Catholic prelate, Bishop of Policastro (1696–(b. 1636)
- September 4 – Peter Barwick, English physician and author (b. 1619)
- September 12 – Sir John Hoskyns, 2nd Baronet, English politician (b. 1634)
- September 13
  - Albert Angell, Norwegian civil servant (b. 1660)
  - Prince George of Hesse-Darmstadt, Field Marshal in the Austrian army (b. 1669)
  - Emeric Thököly, Hungarian nobleman (b. 1657)
- September 17 – Gregorio Compagni, Roman Catholic prelate, Bishop of Larino (1703–1705) and Bishop of Sansepolcro (1696–1705) (b. 1640)
- September 26 – Tommaso d'Aquino, bishop of Sessa Aurunca (b. 1635)
- September 30 – Anne Camm, early British Quaker preacher (b. 1627)
- October 9 – Johann Christoph Wagenseil, German Christian Hebraist (b. 1633)
- October 11 – Guillaume Amontons, French physicist and instrument maker (b. 1663)
- October 17 – Ninon de l'Enclos, French author (b. 1620)
- October 27 – Thyrsus González de Santalla, Spanish theologian, 13th Superior General of the Society of Jesus (b. 1624)
- November 6 – John Platt, American settler (b. 1632)
- November 10 – Justine Siegemund, German midwife (b. 1636)
- November 15 – Margravine Dorothea Charlotte of Brandenburg-Ansbach, German noblewoman (b. 1661)
- November 21 – John Deming, early Puritan settler and original patentee of the Connecticut Colony (b. c. 1615)
- November 23 – Prince William of Denmark, youngest son of Christian V of Denmark and Charlotte Amalie of Hesse-Kassel (b. 1687)
- December 7 – William Lowther, English landowner and politician (b. 1639)
- December 12 – John Easton, political leader in the Colony of Rhode Island and Providence Plantations (b. 1624)
- December 18 – Valentin Stansel, Czech Jesuit astronomer who worked in Brazil (b. 1621)
- December 22 – Bhai Bachittar Singh, Indian Sikh martyr (b. 1664)
- December 23 – Princess Luise Dorothea of Prussia (b. 1680)
- December 26 – Fateh Singh, fourth and youngest son of Guru Gobind Singh (b. 1697)
- December 31 – Catherine of Braganza, widowed queen consort of Charles II of England and regent of Portugal (b. 1638)
- date unknown – Meg Shelton, alleged witch from Lancashire

1706

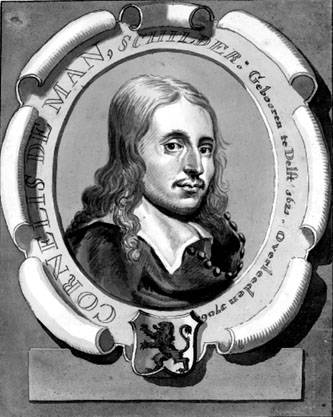
Cornelis de Man

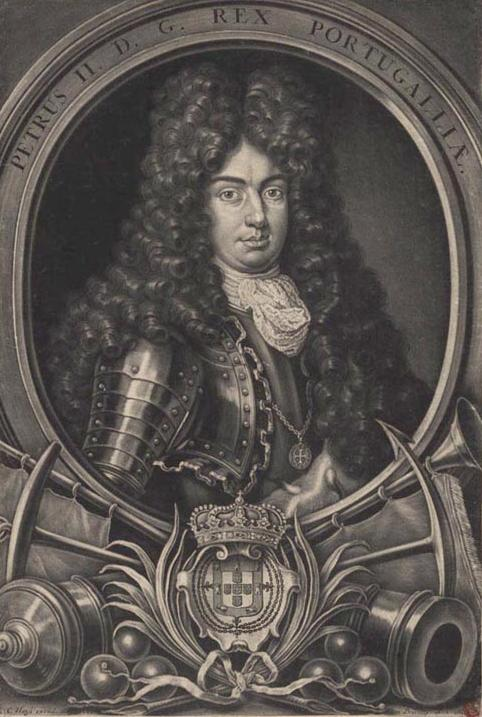
King Peter II of Portugal

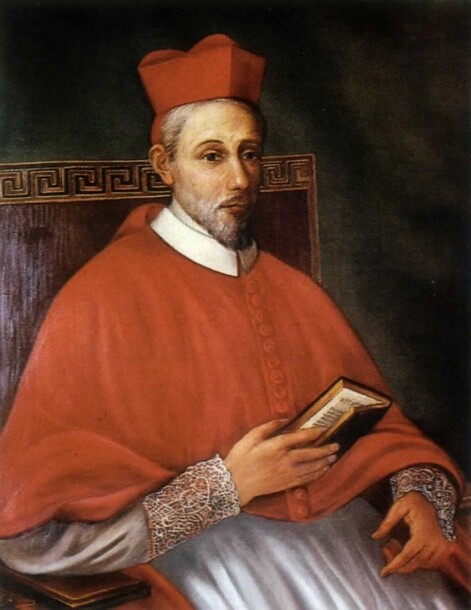
Marcantonio Barbarigo

- January 10 – Luisa Roldán, Spanish artist (b. 1652)
- January 17 – Sir John Lowther, 2nd Baronet, of Whitehaven, English politician (b. 1642)
- January 21 – Adrien Baillet, French scholar and critic (b. 1649)
- January 29 – Charles Sackville, 6th Earl of Dorset, English poet and courtier (b. 1638)
- February 5 – Pierre du Cambout de Coislin, French prelate (b. 1636)
- February 12 – Balthasar Kindermann, German poet (b. 1636)
- February 27 – John Evelyn, English writer, gardener and diarist (b. 1620)
- March 1 – Heino Heinrich Graf von Flemming, German field marshal and Governor of Berlin (b. 1632)
- March 3 – Johann Pachelbel, German composer (b. 1653)
- March 6 – García Felipe de Legazpi y Velasco Altamirano y Albornoz, Spanish Catholic prelate, Bishop of Tlaxcala (b. 1643)
- March 31 – Sultan Muhammad Akbar, Mughal prince (b. 1657)
- April 8 – Caspar Schamberger, German surgeon and merchant (b. 1623)
- April 10 – Arthur Chichester, 3rd Earl of Donegall, Irish soldier (b. 1666)
- April 12 – Thomas Howard, 3rd Earl of Berkshire, English earl and politician (b. 1619)
- April 25 – Thomas Hinckley, last colonial governor of Plymouth Colony (b. 1618)
- April 27 – Bernhard I, Duke of Saxe-Meiningen (1675–1706) (b. 1649)
- May 2 – Georg Joseph Kamel, Jesuit missionary and botanist (b. 1661)
- May 26 – Marcantonio Barbarigo, Italian Roman Catholic cardinal and venerable (b. 1640)
- July 2 – Beatriz Kimpa Vita, Congolese prophet (b. 1684)
- July 9 – Pierre Le Moyne d'Iberville, French founder of the colony of Louisiana (b. 1661)
- August 6 – Jean-Baptiste du Hamel, French cleric and natural philosopher (b. 1624)
- August 23 – Edward Nott, British Colonial Governor of Virginia (b. 1654)
- August 26 – Michael Willmann, German painter (b. 1630)
- September 1 – Cornelis de Man, Dutch painter (b. 1621)
- September 9 – Ferdinand de Marsin, Marshal of France (b. 1656)
- September 16 – Matthias Petersen, sea captain and whaler from the North Frisian island of Föhr (b. 1632)
- September 26 – Onofrio Gabrieli, Italian painter (b. 1619)
- October 13 – Iyasus I of Ethiopia (b. 1682)
- October 17 – William Jones, English lawyer, Deputy Governor of Connecticut (b. 1624)
- October 26 – Andreas Werckmeister, German organist, music theorist, and composer (b. 1645)
- November 9 – Peter Mews, English Royalist theologian and bishop (b. 1619)
- November 15 – Tsangyang Gyatso, 6th Dalai Lama (b. 1683)
- November 16 – Cornelis Evertsen the Youngest, Dutch admiral (b. 1642)
- November 20 – Sir Thomas Roberts, 4th Baronet, English politician (b. 1658)
- December 3 – Countess Emilie Juliane of Barby-Mühlingen, German noblewoman and hymn author (b. 1637)
- December 9 – King Peter II of Portugal (b. 1648)
- December 12 – Christian Louis, Count of Waldeck-Wildungen (1645–1692) and Count of Waldeck and Pyrmont (1692–1706) (b. 1635)
- December 28 – Pierre Bayle, French philosopher (b. 1647)
- Byerley Turk, thoroughbred stallion (b. c. 1684)
- Jeanne Dumée, French astronomer (b. 1660)

1707

- January 1 – Eleanor de Moura, former Spanish viceroy of Sicily (b. c. 1642)
- January 4 – Louis William, Margrave of Baden-Baden, Germany (b. 1655)
- January 8 – John Dalrymple, 1st Earl of Stair, Scottish politician (b. 1648)
- January 10 – Philibert, comte de Gramont, French writer (b. 1621)
- January 16 – William Bowes, English politician (b. 1657)
- January 20
  - Humphrey Hody, English theologian (b. 1659)
  - Leopold Karl von Kollonitsch, Hungarian Catholic cardinal (b. 1631)
- January 22 – Richard Towneley, English mathematician and astronomer from Towneley near Burnley (b. 1629)
- February 22 – Giacinto Calandrucci, Italian painter (b. 1646)

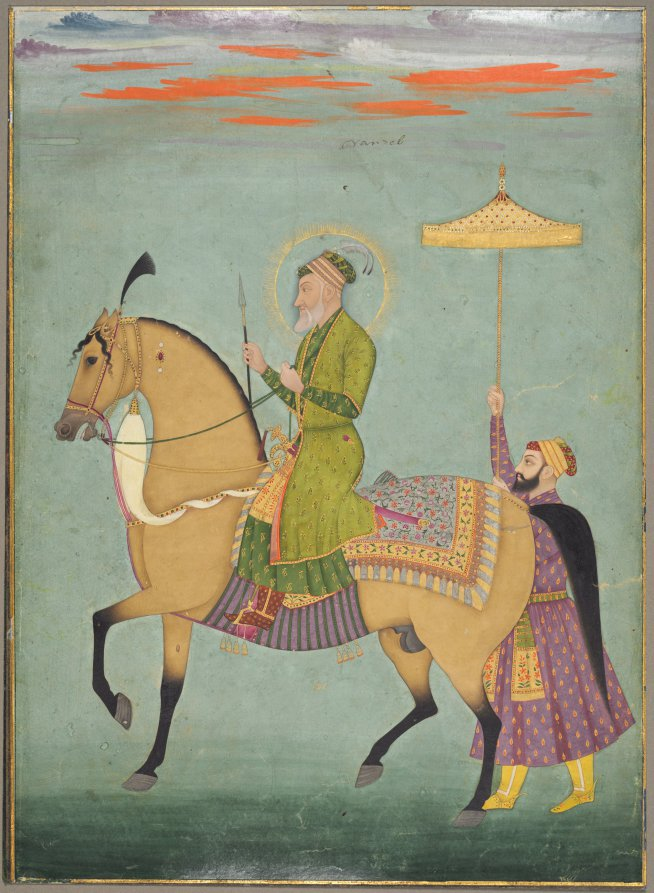
Aurangzeb

- March 3 – Aurangzeb, Mughal Emperor of India (b. 1618)
- March 17 – Elisabeth Charlotte, Countess of Holzappel (b. 1640)
- March 27 – Jean-François Gerbillon, French Jesuit missionary active in China (b. 1654)
- March 30 – Sébastien Le Prestre de Vauban, French noble and military engineer noted for designing fortifications (b. 1633)
- April 2 – Gérard Edelinck, Flemish engraver (b. 1640)
- April 6 – Willem van de Velde the Younger, Dutch painter (b. 1633)
- April 24 – Walter Charleton, English natural philosopher (b. 1619)
- April 26 – Johann Christoph Denner, German musical instrument maker (b. 1655)
- April 28 – Christian, Duke of Saxe-Eisenberg (b. 1653)
- April 29 – George Farquhar, Irish dramatist (b. 1677)
- May 3 – Michiel de Swaen, Flemish poet (b. 1654)
- May 9 – Dieterich Buxtehude, German composer (b. c. 1637)
- May 10 – Johann Ernst III, Duke of Saxe-Weimar (b. 1664)
- May 19 – Jean II d'Estrées, French noble (b. 1624)
- May 21 – Joan Geelvinck, Dutch politician (b. 1644)
- May 24 – Henri Albert de La Grange d'Arquien, French Catholic cardinal (b. 1613)
- May 27 – Françoise-Athénaïs de Rochechouart de Mortemart, mistress of King Louis XIV of France (b. 1641)
- May 31 – Simon Patrick, English theologian and bishop (b. 1626)
- June 8 – Muhammad Azam Shah, Mughal emperor (b. 1653)
- June 15 – Giorgio Baglivi, Armenian doctor and writer (b. 1668)
- June 21 – Robert Phelips, English politician (b. 1619)
- June 23 – John Mill, English theologian (b. c. 1645)
- June 27 – Johann Zahn, German author (b. 1641)
- August 7 – Henry Poley, English politician (b. 1654)
- August 18 – William Cavendish, 1st Duke of Devonshire, English soldier, statesman (b. 1640)
- August 20 – Nicolas Gigault, French organist and composer (b. 1627)
- September 12 – Samuel Willard, American theologian (b. 1640)
- September 15 – George Stepney, British poet and diplomat (b. 1663)
- September 21 – Wilhelmus Beekman, Dutch politician (b. 1623)
- September 24 – Vincenzo da Filicaja, Italian poet (b. 1642)
- October 10 – Johann Patkul, Livonian nobleman, politician (b. 1660)
- October 22 – Sir Cloudesley Shovell, British admiral, drowned (b. 1650)
- November 26 – Leonhard Dientzenhofer, German architect (b. 1660)
- November 27 – Fitz-John Winthrop, Governor of the Connecticut Colony (b. 1637)
- December 1 – Jeremiah Clarke, English composer and organist, suicide (b. 1674)
- December 24
  - Noël Coypel, French painter (b. 1628)
  - Karolina of Legnica-Brieg, Silesian noblewoman (b. 1652)
- December 27
  - Robert Leke, 3rd Earl of Scarsdale, English earl, politician (b. 1654)
  - Jean Mabillon, French palaeographer, diplomat (b. 1632)
- date unknown
  - Maria Clara Eimmart, German astronomer, engraver and designer (b. 1676)
  - Julie d'Aubigny, French swordswoman, opera singer (b. 1670)
  - Umze Peljor, Bhutanese head of government and monk

1708

- January 31 – Friedrich Seyler, Swiss theologian (b. 1642)
- March 5 – William Beveridge, English Bishop of St. Asaph (b. 1637)
- March 15 – William Walsh, English/British politician (b. 1662)
- March 19 – Samuel Rodigast, German poet, hymnwriter (b. 1649)
- April 5 – Christian Heinrich, Margrave of Brandenburg-Bayreuth-Kulmbach, German prince (b. 1661)
- April 17 – Jacques Gravier, French Jesuit missionary in the New World (b. 1651)
- April 20 – Damaris Cudworth Masham, English philosopher (b. 1659)
- April 23 – Christian Augustus, Count Palatine of Sulzbach (1632–1708) (b. 1622)
- May 6 – François de Laval, first bishop of New France (b. 1623)
- May 11 – Jules Hardouin-Mansart, French Baroque architect (b. 1646)
- May 12 – Adolphus Frederick II, Duke of Mecklenburg-Strelitz (b. 1658)
- June 5 – Ignatius George II, Syriac Orthodox Patriarch of Antioch (b. 1648)
- June 21 – John Hamilton, 2nd Lord Belhaven and Stenton, Scottish politician (b. 1656)
- June 28 – Melchor Liñán y Cisneros, Spanish Catholic archbishop (b. 1629)
- June 30 – Emperor Tekle Haymanot I of Ethiopia (stabbed to death) (b. 1706)
- July 5 – Ferdinando Carlo Gonzaga, Duke of Mantua and Montferrat, only child of Duke Charles II (b. 1652)
- July 10 – James Kendall, English soldier, politician (b. 1647)
- July 21 – Conrad von Reventlow, Danish statesman and the first Grand Chancellor of Denmark (b. 1644)
- August 1 – Edward Tyson, British scientist (b. 1651)
- September 6 – Sir John Morden, 1st Baronet, English merchant and philanthropist (b. 1623)
- September 19 – Francis Newport, 1st Earl of Bradford, English politician (b. 1620)
- September 29 – Sir James Oxenden, 2nd Baronet, English politician (b. 1641)
- October 1 – John Blow, British composer (b. 1649)
- October 2 – Anne Jules de Noailles, French general (b. 1650)

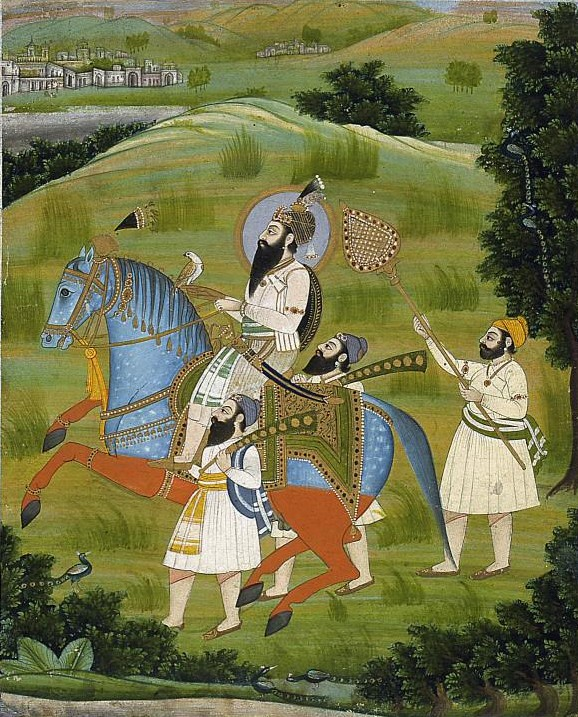
Guru Gobind Singh

- October 7 – Guru Gobind Singh, 10th Guru Sahib of Sikhism, social reformist, poet and revolutionary (b. 1666)
- October 9 – Olympia Mancini, French courtier (b. 1638)
- October 10 – David Gregory, Scottish astronomer (b. 1659)
- October 11 – Ehrenfried Walther von Tschirnhaus, German mathematician (b. 1651)
- October 21 – Christian Weise, German writer, dramatist, poet, pedagogue and librarian (b. 1642)
- October 22
  - Cesare Pronti, Italian painter (b. 1626)
  - Hermann Witsius, Dutch theologian (b. 1636)
- October 24 – Seki Kōwa, Japanese mathematician (b. c. 1640)
- October 28 – Prince George of Denmark, consort of Anne, Queen of Great Britain (b. 1653)
- October 31 – Nathaniel Higginson, English politician (b. 1652)
- November 3 – Countess Henriette Catherine of Nassau, daughter of Frederick Henry (b. 1637)
- November 10 – David Makeléer, Swedish politician (b. 1646)
- November 13 – Charles, Count of Marsan, French noble (b. 1648)
- November 16 – Alexander Edward, Scottish landscape architect (b. 1651)
- November 17 – Ludolf Bakhuizen, Dutch painter (b. 1631)
- December 16
  - Juan Ortega y Montañés, Spanish Catholic bishop, colonial administrator in Guatemala and New Spain (b. 1627)
  - Nicolas Pasquin, early pioneer in New France (now Quebec) (b. 1648)
- December 22 – Hedvig Sophia of Sweden, Swedish princess (b. 1681)
- December 28 – Joseph Pitton de Tournefort, French botanist (b. 1656)
- date unknown
  - Anna Maria Clodt, Swedish courtier (b. ?)
  - Joaquim Juncosa, Carthusian monk and Baroque painter (b. 1631)

1709

- January 20 – François de la Chaise, French confessor of Louis XIV of France (b. 1624)
- January 22 – Henry Herbert, 1st Baron Herbert of Chirbury, English politician (b. 1654)
- January 24 – George Rooke, English admiral (b. 1650)
- January 26 – Eleonore Charlotte of Saxe-Lauenburg-Franzhagen, Duchess of Schleswig-Holstein-Sonderburg-Franzhagen (b. 1646)
- February 8 – Giuseppe Torelli, Italian composer (b. 1658)
- February 9 – François Louis, Prince of Conti, French general (b. 1664)
- February 11 – Louise Hollandine of the Palatinate, German artist (b. 1622)
- February 17 – Erik Benzelius the Elder, Swedish theologian (b. 1632)
- February 19 – Tokugawa Tsunayoshi, Japanese shōgun (b. 1646)
- March 9 – Ralph Montagu, 1st Duke of Montagu, English diplomat (b. 1638)
- March 21 – Burchard de Volder, Dutch mathematician (b. 1643)
- April 1 – Henri Jules, Prince of Condé (b. 1643)
- April 2 – Giovanni Battista Gaulli, Italian artist working in the High Baroque and early Rococo periods (b. 1639)
- April 5 – Roger de Piles, French painter (b. 1635)
- April 8 – Wolfgang Dietrich of Castell-Remlingen, German nobleman (b. 1641)
- April 20 – Johann Ernst von Thun, Tyrolean Catholic bishop (b. 1643)
- April 21
  - Gurgin Khan (George XI of Kartli), Persian Governor of Kandahar (b. 1651)
  - Emmanuel Philibert, Prince of Carignano, Prince of Savoy (b. 1628)
- June 25 – Frederick VII, Margrave of Baden-Durlach from 1677 until his death (b. 1647)
- June 29 – Antoine Thomas, Belgian Jesuit astronomer in China (b. 1644)
- June 30 – Edward Lhuyd, Welsh scientist (b. 1660)
- July 17 – Robert Bolling, English settler in Virginia (b. 1646)
- August 24 – Elisabeth Dorothea of Saxe-Gotha-Altenburg, German princess (b. 1640)
- August 31 – Andrea Pozzo, Jesuit Brother, architect and painter (b. 1642)
- September 4 – Jean-François Regnard, French comic poet (b. 1655)
- September 7 – Gunno Dahlstierna, Swedish poet (b. 1661)
- September 14 – Luis Manuel Fernández de Portocarrero, Spanish cardinal and archbishop of Toledo (b. 1635)
- October 2 – Ivan Mazepa, Hetman of Ukraine (b. 1639)
- October 5 – Daniel Speer, German Baroque composer and writer (b. 1636)
- October 9 – Barbara Palmer, 1st Duchess of Cleveland, English mistress of Charles II of England (b. 1640)
- October 31 – Henry Hyde, 2nd Earl of Clarendon, English nobleman (b. 1638)
- November 4 – Barend Graat, Dutch painter (b. 1628)
- November 23 – William Bentinck, 1st Earl of Portland (b. 1649)
- November 29 – Charles Dormer, 2nd Earl of Carnarvon, English noble (b. 1632)
- December 1 – Abraham a Sancta Clara, Austrian preacher (b. 1644)
- December 7 – Meindert Hobbema, Dutch painter (b. 1638)
- December 8 – Thomas Corneille, French dramatist (b. 1625)
- December 15 – Sir Stephen Lennard, 2nd Baronet, English politician (b. 1637)
- December 31
  - Pierre Cally, French philosopher and theologian (b. 1630)
  - Sir Thomas Littleton, 3rd Baronet, English statesman (b. 1647)
- date unknown – John Coode, Colonial governor of Maryland (b. c. 1648)
- probable date – Eleanor Glanville, English entomologist (b. 1654)
