= 1707 =

1707 in various calendars
- Gregorian calendar: 1707; MDCCVII
- Ab urbe condita: 2460
- Armenian calendar: 1156; ԹՎ ՌՃԾԶ
- Assyrian calendar: 6457
- Balinese saka calendar: 1628–1629
- Bengali calendar: 1113–1114
- Berber calendar: 2657
- British Regnal year: 5 Ann. 1 – 6 Ann. 1
- Buddhist calendar: 2251
- Burmese calendar: 1069
- Byzantine calendar: 7215–7216
- Chinese calendar: 丙戌年 (Fire Dog); 4404 or 4197 — to — 丁亥年 (Fire Pig); 4405 or 4198
- Coptic calendar: 1423–1424
- Discordian calendar: 2873
- Ethiopian calendar: 1699–1700
- Hebrew calendar: 5467–5468
- Hindu calendars
- Vikram Samvat: 1763–1764
- Shaka Samvat: 1628–1629
- Kali Yuga: 4807–4808
- Holocene calendar: 11707
- Igbo calendar: 707–708
- Iranian calendar: 1085–1086
- Islamic calendar: 1118–1119
- Japanese calendar: Hōei 4 (宝永４年)
- Javanese calendar: 1630–1631
- Julian calendar: Gregorian minus 11 days
- Korean calendar: 4040
- Minguo calendar: 205 before ROC 民前205年
- Nanakshahi calendar: 239
- Thai solar calendar: 2249–2250
- Tibetan calendar: མེ་ཕོ་ཁྱི་ལོ་ (male Fire-Dog); 1833 or 1452 or 680 — to — མེ་མོ་ཕག་ལོ་ (female Fire-Boar); 1834 or 1453 or 681

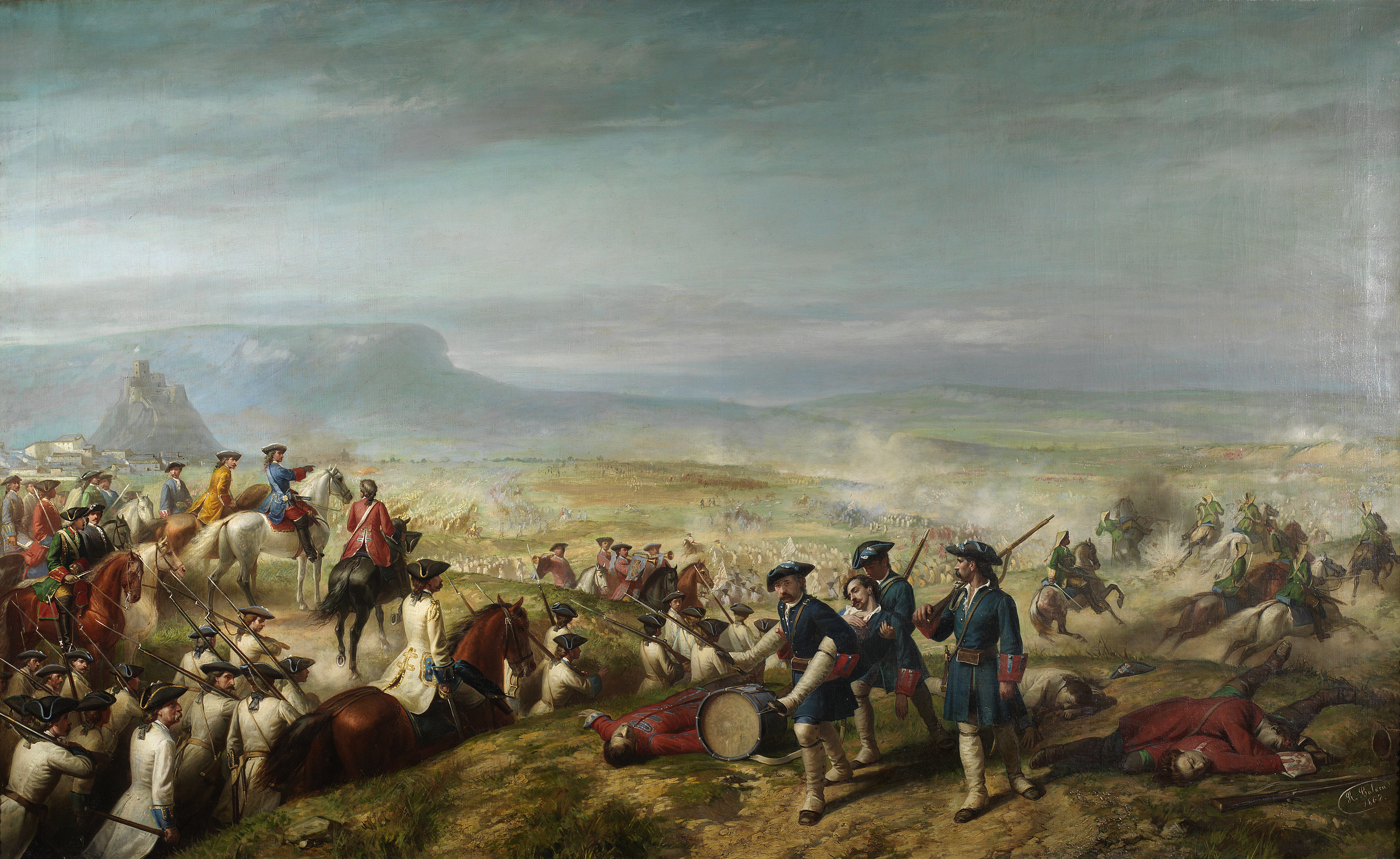
April 25: Spanish and French Bourbons win the Battle of Almansa in Spain.

1707 (MDCCVII) was a common year starting on Saturday of the Gregorian calendar and a common year starting on Wednesday of the Julian calendar, the 1707th year of the Common Era (CE) and Anno Domini (AD) designations, the 707th year of the 2nd millennium, the 7th year of the 18th century, and the 8th year of the 1700s decade. As of the start of 1707, the Gregorian calendar was 11 days ahead of the Julian calendar, which remained in localized use until 1923.

In the Swedish calendar it was a common year starting on Tuesday, one day ahead of the Julian and ten days behind the Gregorian calendar.

== Events ==
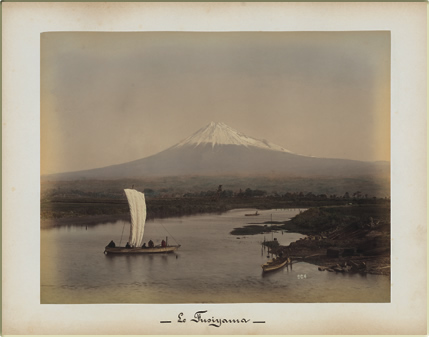
December 16: The last recorded eruption of Mount Fuji begins.

=== January–March ===
- January 1 – John V is crowned King of Portugal and the Algarves in Lisbon.
- January 16 – The Treaty (or Act) of Union, of the two Kingdoms of Scotland and England, is ratified by the Parliament of Scotland by a vote of 110 to 68.
- February 4 – Great Northern War: Eighteen months after losing the Battle of Warsaw, while leading a cavalry charge for Saxony against the army of Sweden, General Otto von Paykull of Swedish Livonia is beheaded outside of Stockholm, following his conviction for treason.
- February 15 – As part of the process of the unification of Scotland and England as Great Britain, Scotland selects 16 members to sit in the House of Lords at the Palace of Westminster.
- March 3 – Emperor Aurangzeb dies in Ahmednagar, Aurangabad.
- March 19 – The Act of Union with Scotland is ratified by the Parliament of England; the Parliament of Scotland is adjourned for the last time on May 1, 1707.

=== April–June ===
- April 25 (April 14 Old Style) – War of the Spanish Succession – Battle of Almansa: The Bourbon army of Spain and France (with Irish mercenaries) under the French-born Englishman James FitzJames, 1st Duke of Berwick, soundly defeats the allied forces of Portugal, England, and the Dutch Republic led by the French-born Huguenot (in English service) Henri de Massue, Earl of Galway. Following this, Philip V of Spain promulgates the first Nueva Planta decrees, bringing the Kingdoms of Valencia and Aragon under the laws of the Crown of Castile.
- May 8 – The siege of Játiva within the Spanish kingdom of Valencia begins as 9,000 Castilian and French troops, at the direction of King Philip V attack Játiva, defended by troops of the Kingdom of Aragon. Játiva (modern Xàtiva) falls on June 6.
- May 12 (May 1 Old Style) – The new sovereign state of Great Britain comes into being, as a result of the Acts of Union, which combine the Kingdoms of Scotland and England into a single united Kingdom of Great Britain, and merge the Parliaments of England and Scotland, to form the Parliament of Great Britain.
- May 23 – The volcanic eruption in the Santorini caldera begins.
- June 4 – On the island later known as Sri Lanka, Narendra Sinha becomes the monarch of most of the area as the new Kandyan king, succeeding to the throne upon the death of his father, King Vimaladharmasuriya II. Narendra Sinha reigns for almost 32 years until his death on May 13, 1739.
- June 6 – The soldiers and officers defending the Aragonese city of Játiva are massacred after a larger force of Castilian troops breaks through the walls at the end of a 30-day siege. The rest of the town's residents are deported, and most of the dwellings are burned, with the area being renamed "San Felipe".
- June 8 – Less than three months after proclaiming himself to be the new Emperor of India, Muhammad Azam Shah and his three sons are killed in a battle by his troops led by his half-brother Muhammad Mu'azzam
- June 13 – On Francis II Rákóczi's recommendation, and with Count Miklos Bercsényi's support, a meeting of the Hungarian independence activists, held at the village of Ónod declares the deposing of the House of Habsburg (and Joseph I, King of Hungary) from the Hungarian throne.
- June 19 – The coronation of Muhammad Mu'azzam as the new Emperor of India, Bahadur Shah I, takes place in Delhi
- June 28 – Yeshe Gyatso is installed as the new Dalai Lama by his father, Lha-bzang Khan, who has recently deposed the 6th Dalai Lama. Though the justification is that the 21-year-old Yeshe was the true reincarnation of the 5th Dalai Lama, Yeshe receives no recognition from Buddhists in Tibet or Mongolia and the 7th Dalai Lama is installed in 1710.

=== July– September ===
- July 29–August 21 – War of the Spanish Succession – Battle of Toulon: The Allies are obliged to withdraw, but the French fleet is effectively put out of action.
- August 27 – Charles XII of Sweden launches his campaign to conquer Russia, marching to the east from Altranstädt with 60,000 coalition troops. Another 16,000 soldiers are waiting on the outskirts of Riga, guarding the Swedish supply lines.
- September 14 – Vincenzo Durazzo is elected to a 2-year term as the new Doge of the Republic of Genoa (including the island of Corsica), succeeding the outgoing Doge, Domenico Maria De Mari.
- September 18–October 4 – War of the Spanish Succession: The Siege of Ciudad Rodrigo, led by troops under the command of Alexandre Maître, begins and lasts for 16 days. On the final day, General Maitre begins the attack that takes the fortress within 45 minutes.
- September 30 – War of the Spanish Succession: the conquest by Austrian troops, of the Italian peninsula city state of Gaeta, is accomplished after a three-month siege led by General Wirich Philipp von Daun.

=== October– December ===
- October 22 – Scilly naval disaster: Four British Royal Navy ships run aground in the Isles of Scilly, because of faulty navigation. Admiral Sir Cloudesley Shovell and at least 1,450 sailors all drown.
- October 23 – The Parliament of the Kingdom of Great Britain first meets in London.
- October 28 – The Hōei earthquake (the most powerful in Japan until 2011) strikes, with an estimated local magnitude of 8.6 and kills at least 5,000 people.
- November 30 – War of the Spanish Succession: The Siege of Pensacola ends, with the Spanish successfully defending their fort.
- December 16 – The last recorded eruption of Mount Fuji begins in Japan.
- December 24 – The first British Governor of Gibraltar, directly appointed by Queen Anne, Roger Elliott, takes up his residence in the Convent of the Franciscan Friars.
- December 28 – Charles XII of Sweden and his coalition of troops begin crossing the first line of defense of the Russian Empire, the Vistula River, in their attempt to conquer Russia.

=== Date unknown ===
- A fortress is founded on the future site of Ust-Abakanskoye (modern Abakan).
- The Lao empire of Lan Xang officially ends, and splits into the kingdoms of Vientiane, Luang Prabang, and Champasak.
- Hacienda Juriquilla is built in Querétaro, Mexico.
- The English Parliament establishes the first turnpike trusts, which place a length of road under the control of trustees, drawn from local landowners and traders. The trusts borrow capital for road maintenance against the security of tolls, and this arrangement becomes the common method of road maintenance for the next 150 years.
- Battle of Yuraktau, the event that leads to the strengthening of the Bashkir rebellion of 1704–1711.

== Births ==
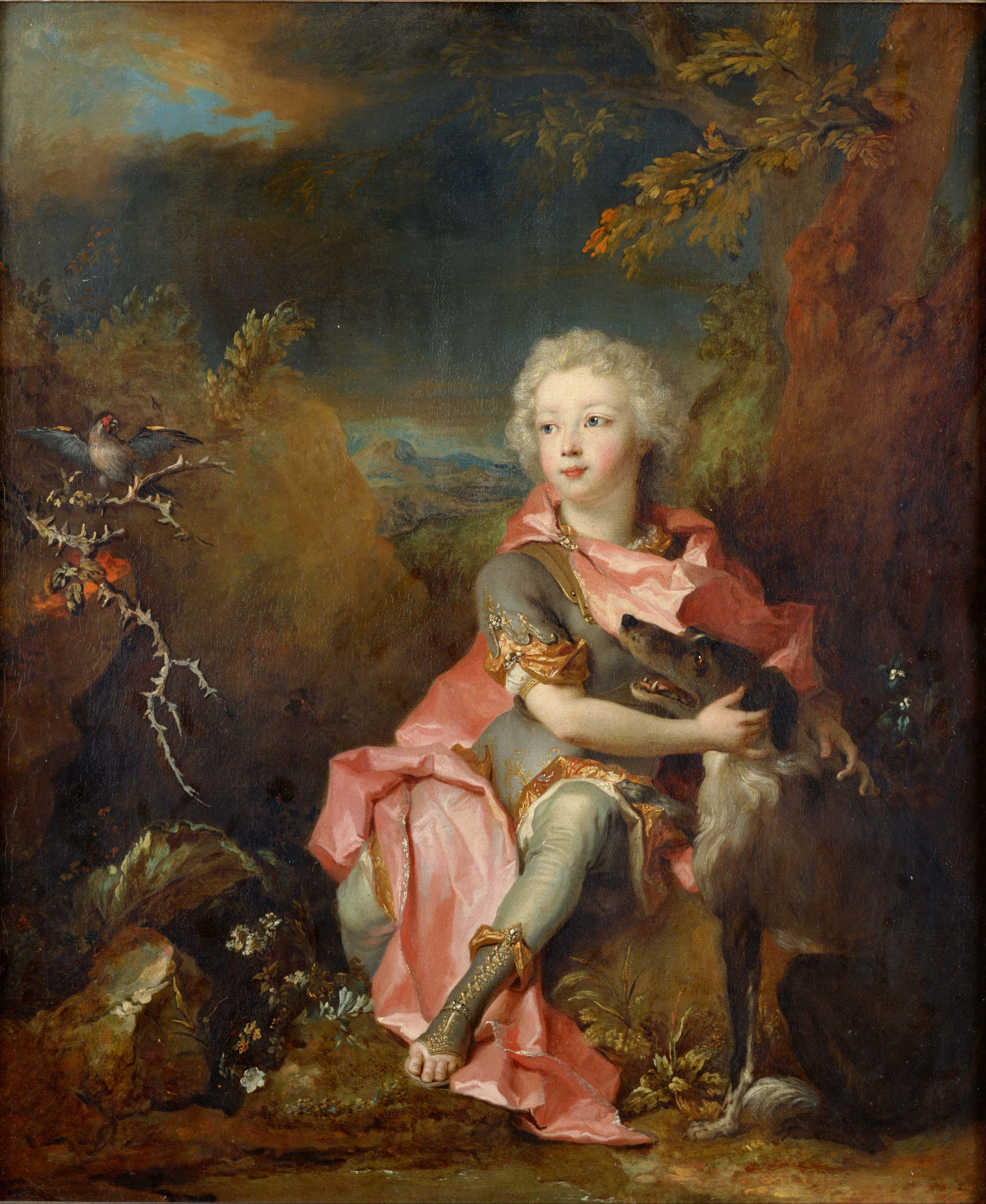
Louis, Duke of Brittany born 8 January

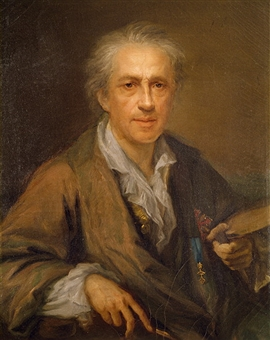
Giuseppe Bonito born 11 January

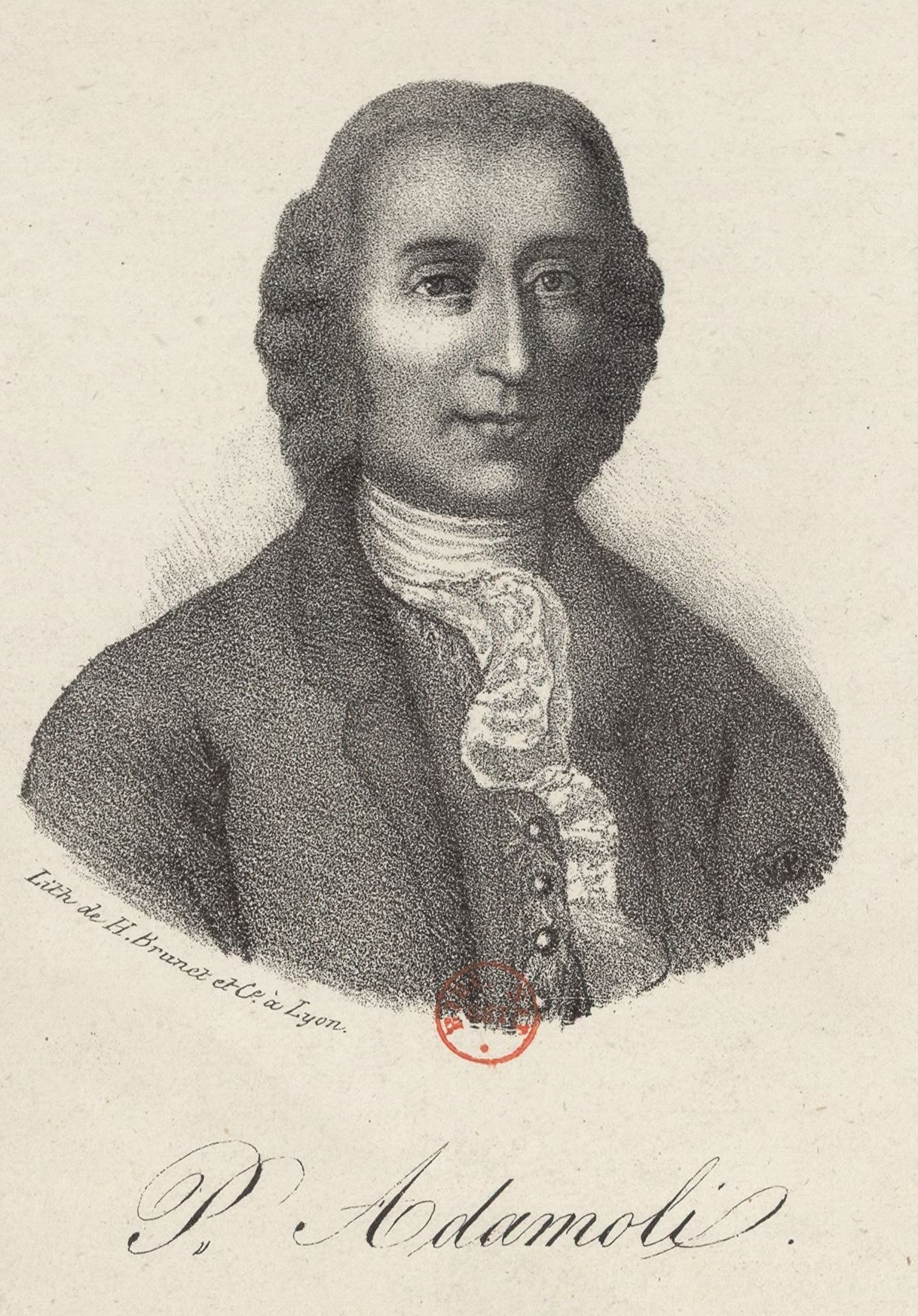
Pierre Adamoli born 5 August

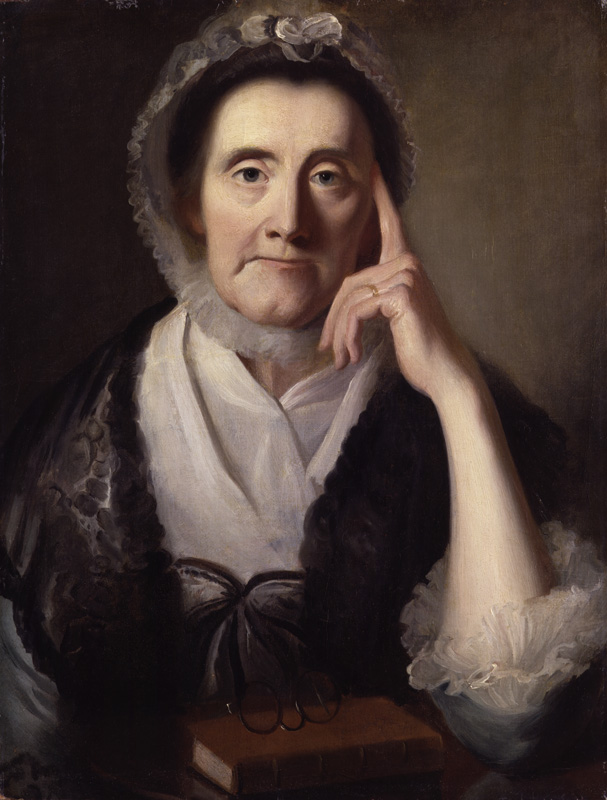
Selina Hastings, Countess of Huntingdon born 24 August

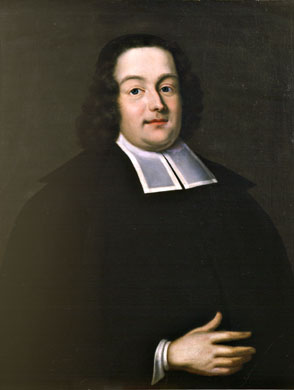
Johannes Browallius born 30 August

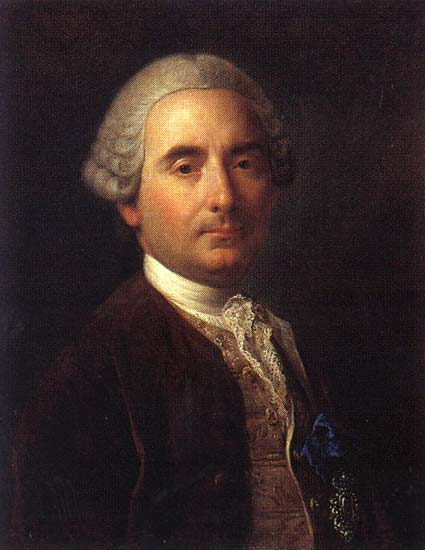
Pietro Rotari born 30 September

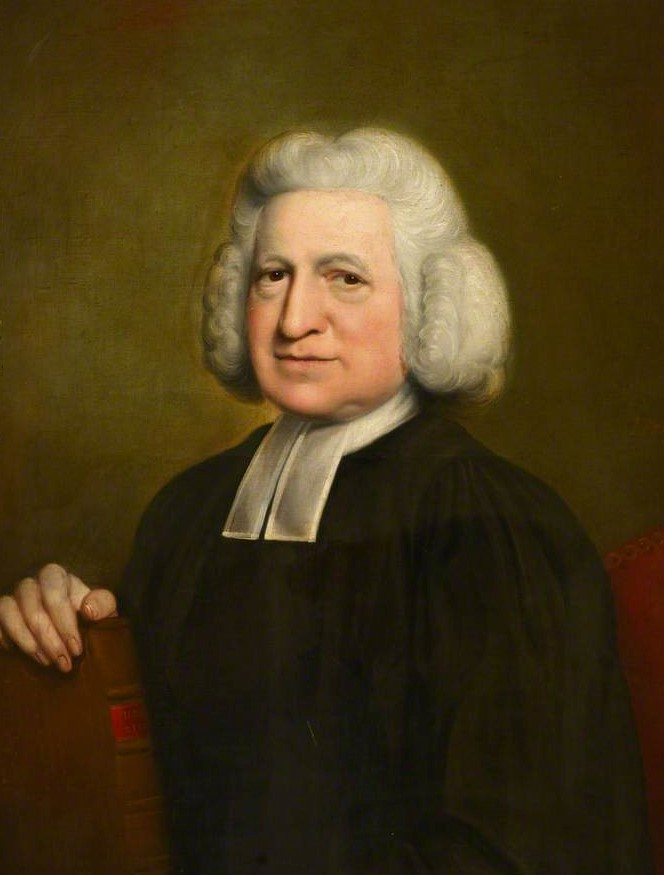
Charles Wesley born 18 December

=== January–March ===
- January 2 – Johann Adam Lehmus, German poet of numerous spiritual songs (d. 1788)
- January 8 – Louis, Duke of Brittany, second son of Louis of France (d. 1712)
- January 11 – Giuseppe Bonito, Neapolitan painter of the Rococo period (d. 1789)
- January 13 – John Boyle, 5th Earl of Cork, Irish writer (d. 1762)
- January 17 – Prospero Colonna di Sciarra, Italian cardinal of the family of the dukes of Carbognano (d. 1765)
- January 22 – Carl Höckh, German violinist and composer (d. 1773)
- January 26 – Abbé François Blanchet, French littérateur (d. 1784)
- February 1 – Frederick, Prince of Wales (d. 1751)
- February 13
  - Claude Prosper Jolyot de Crébillon, French novelist (d. 1777)
  - Johann William, Count of Erbach-Fürstenau, member of the German House of Erbach who held the fiefs of Fürstenau (d. 1742)
- February 25 – Carlo Goldoni, Italian playwright (d. 1793)
- February 26 – Mariano Arciero, Italian Roman Catholic priest (d. 1788)
- February 27 – Joseph Johann Kauffmann, Austrian painter known for his portraits, church decorations and castle depictions (d. 1782)
- February 28 – Johann Christian Senckenberg, German physician (d. 1772)
- March 1
  - Pierre-Antoine de La Place, French writer and playwright (d. 1793)
  - Jedidiah Preble, Captain of Infantry in Samuel Waldo's Regiment (d. 1784)
- March 2
  - Louis-Michel van Loo, French painter (d. 1771)
  - Guillaume Barthez de Marmorières, French civil engineer (d. 1799)
- March 3 – Johan Ihre, Swedish philologist and historical linguist (d. 1780)
- March 7 – Stephen Hopkins, governor of the Colony of Rhode Island and Providence Plantations (d. 1785)
- March 8
  - William Irby, 1st Baron Boston, British peer and Member of Parliament (d. 1775)
  - Mary Jones, English poet (d. 1778)
- March 20 – Hugh Boscawen, 2nd Viscount Falmouth (d. 1782)
- March 23
  - Stephen van Rensselaer I, second son of Kiliaen van Rensselaer and Maria van Cortlandt (d. 1747)
  - Henry Scudamore, 3rd Duke of Beaufort (d. 1745)

=== April–June ===
- April 4 – Hans Karl von Winterfeldt, Prussian general (d. 1757)
- April 6 – Abraham de Haen, Dutch draughtsman, engraver, painter and poet (d. 1748)
- April 10
  - Michel Corrette, French composer (d. 1795)
  - Sir John Pringle, 1st Baronet, Scottish physician (d. 1782)
- April 13 – Sir Henry Cavendish, 1st Baronet, British politician who held several appointments in the Kingdom of Ireland (d. 1776)
- April 15
  - Stefano Evodio Assemani, Ottoman-born orientalist, translator, working in the Vatican library (d. 1782)
  - Leonhard Euler, Swiss mathematician and physicist (d. 1783)
  - Claude Louis, Comte de Saint-Germain (d. 1778)
- April 20 – Robert Foulis, Scottish printer and publisher (d. 1776)
- April 22 – Henry Fielding, English novelist and dramatist known for his earthy humour and satire (d. 1754)
- April 25 – Léopold Clément, Hereditary Prince of Lorraine, French prince (d. 1723)
- April 26 – Johannes Burman, Dutch botanist and physician (d. 1780)
- April 28 – Olivier de Vézin, Canadian ironmaster and chief surveyor of Louisiana (d. 1776)
- May 1 – Herbert Windsor, 2nd Viscount Windsor (d. 1758)
- May 2 – Jean-Baptiste Barrière, French cellist and composer (d. 1747)
- May 12 – Francisco Salzillo, Spanish sculptor (d. 1781)
- May 14 – António Teixeira, Portuguese composer (d. 1774)
- May 19 – Robert Hamilton, moderator (d. 1787)
- May 23 – Carl Linnaeus, Swedish botanist (d. 1778)
- May 31 – Pietro De Martino, Italian mathematician and astronomer (d. 1746)
- June 4
  - Benito Fernández de Santa Ana, Franciscan friar, president of the Texas missions of the College of Santa Cruz de Querétaro from 1734 to 1750 (d. 1761)
  - Henning Alexander von Kleist, Prussian Lieutenant-General and Chief of Fusiliers (d. 1784)
- June 15 – Johannes Grubenmann, member of the Swiss family Grubenmann who were famous as carpenters and civil engineers (d. 1771)
- June 18 – Pietro Correr, Italian politician and diplomat (d. 1768)
- June 20 – Louis de Cardevac, marquis d'Havrincourt (d. 1767)

=== July–September ===
- July 7 – Henry Cunningam, Irish Anglican priest (d. 1777)
- July 8 – Jacques-Philippe Le Bas, French engraver (d. 1783)
- July 10 – Sir William Lowther, 1st Baronet, of Little Preston, English landowner and curate (d. 1788)
- July 17 – Johann Joseph von Trautson, Roman Catholic clergyman (d. 1757)
- July 23 – Edward Bentham, Oxford based theologian who in 1763 (d. 1776)
- August 4 – Johann August Ernesti, German Rationalist theologian and philologist (d. 1781)
- August 5 – Pierre Adamoli, French collector (d. 1769)
- August 7 – Carl Günther Ludovici, German philosopher, lexicographer and economist (d. 1778)
- August 20 – Jacques Roettiers, engraver in England and France (d. 1784)
- August 24 – Selina Hastings, Countess of Huntingdon, English Methodist leader (d. 1791)
- August 25 – King Louis I of Spain (d. 1724)
- August 27 – Zanetta Farussi, Italian comedic actress (d. 1776)
- August 30 – Johannes Browallius, Finnish and Swedish Lutheran theologian, physicist, botanist, friend of Carl Linnaeus (d. 1755)
- September – Nathan Alcock, English physician (d. 1779)
- September 1 – John Salusbury, Welsh nobleman (d. 1762)
- September 2 – Gian Benedetto Mittarelli, Italian monk and monastic historian (d. 1777)
- September 3 – Johann Peter Süssmilch, German Protestant pastor (d. 1767)
- September 5 – John Forbes, British general (d. 1759)
- September 7 – Georges-Louis Leclerc, Comte de Buffon, French scientist (d. 1788)
- September 22 – John Rattray, Edinburgh surgeon who served as surgeon to Prince Charles Edward Stuart (d. 1771)
- September 29 – Antoine Clériadus de Choiseul-Beaupré (d. 1774)
- September 30
  - Pietro Rotari, Italian painter (d. 1762)
  - Richard Trevor, bishop (d. 1771)

=== October–December ===
- October 4 – Francesco Fontebasso, Italian painter of the late-Baroque or Rococo period of Venice (d. 1769)
- October 6 – Thomas Falkner, English Jesuit missionary (d. 1784)
- October 20 – Thomas Church, British priest and controversialist (d. 1756)
- October 30 – Jeanne Thérèse du Han, Lorraine nobility (d. 1748)
- November 7 – Dieterich Bernhard Ludewig, German organist (d. 1740)
- November 9 – Louis de Pardaillan de Gondrin, French courtier, freemason and great-grandson of Madame de Montespan (d. 1743)
- November 12
  - Emmerich Joseph von Breidbach zu Bürresheim, Archbishop-Elector of Mainz from 1763 to 1774 and Prince-Bishop of Worms from 1768 to 1774 (d. 1774)
  - Joseph du Pont Duvivier, Acadian-born military leader of the French (d. 1760)
- November 15 – Prince Adarnase of Kartli, Georgian prince royal (d. 1784)
- November 23 – Anna Karolina Orzelska, adventuress and Polish szlachcianka (noblewoman) (d. 1769)
- November 28 – Giammaria Mazzucchelli, Italian writer, bibliographer and historian (d. 1765)
- December 2
  - Karl Christoph von der Goltz, lieutenant general in the Prussian army during the reign of Frederick the Great (d. 1761)
  - Johann Julius Hecker, German educator who established the first Realschule and Prussia's first teacher-education institution (d. 1768)
- December 4 – Louise Françoise de Bourbon, Mademoiselle du Maine, granddaughter of Louis XIV of France and his mistress Françoise-Athénaïs (d. 1743)
- December 11 – Paul von Werner, chief of the Prussian Hussar Regiment No. 6 (d. 1785)
- December 17 – Ernest Frederick II, Duke of Saxe-Hildburghausen (d. 1745)
- December 18
  - Walter Calverley-Blackett, British baronet and politician (d. 1777)
  - Charles Wesley, English Methodist leader, brother of John Wesley (d. 1788)
- December 22 – Johann Amman, Swiss-Russian botanist (d. 1741)
- December 25 – Sir Joseph Hoare, 1st Baronet, Anglo-Irish politician (d. 1801)
- date unknown
  - Giuseppe Bonici, Maltese architect and military engineer (d. 1779)
  - Moshe Chaim Luzzatto, Italian rabbi, mystic, and philosopher (d. 1746)
- probable William Hoare, English painter (d. 1792)

== Deaths ==
- January 1 – Eleanor de Moura, former Spanish viceroy of Sicily (b. c. 1642)
- January 4 – Louis William, Margrave of Baden-Baden, Germany (b. 1655)
- January 8 – John Dalrymple, 1st Earl of Stair, Scottish politician (b. 1648)
- January 10 – Philibert, comte de Gramont, French writer (b. 1621)
- January 16 – William Bowes, English politician (b. 1657)
- January 20
  - Humphrey Hody, English theologian (b. 1659)
  - Leopold Karl von Kollonitsch, Hungarian Catholic cardinal (b. 1631)
- January 22 – Richard Towneley, English mathematician and astronomer from Towneley near Burnley (b. 1629)
- February 22 – Giacinto Calandrucci, Italian painter (b. 1646)

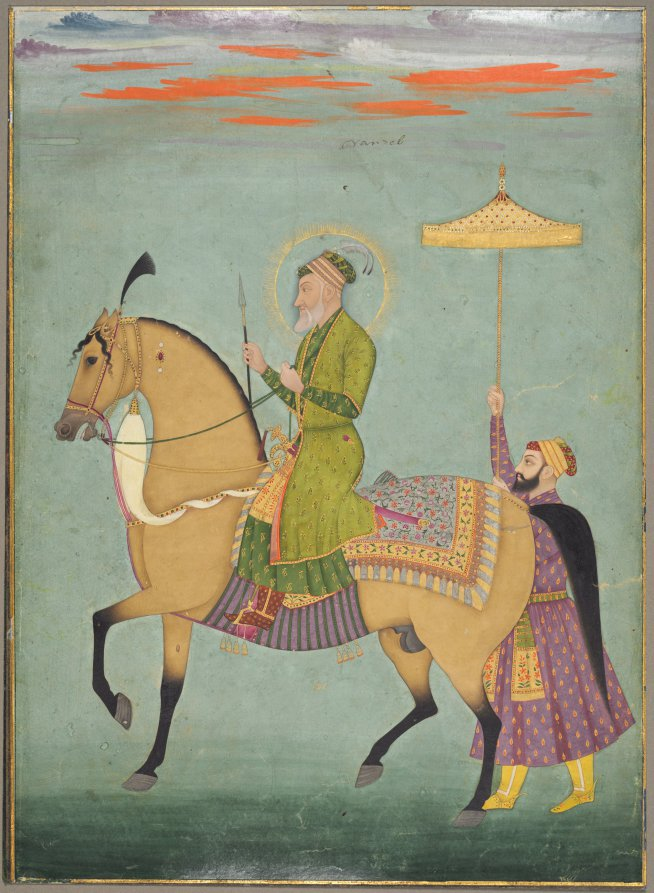
Aurangzeb

- March 3 – Aurangzeb, Mughal Emperor of India (b. 1618)
- March 17 – Elisabeth Charlotte, Countess of Holzappel (b. 1640)
- March 27 – Jean-François Gerbillon, French Jesuit missionary active in China (b. 1654)
- March 30 – Sébastien Le Prestre de Vauban, French noble and military engineer noted for designing fortifications (b. 1633)
- April 2 – Gérard Edelinck, Flemish engraver (b. 1640)
- April 6 – Willem van de Velde the Younger, Dutch painter (b. 1633)
- April 24 – Walter Charleton, English natural philosopher (b. 1619)
- April 26 – Johann Christoph Denner, German musical instrument maker (b. 1655)
- April 28 – Christian, Duke of Saxe-Eisenberg (b. 1653)
- April 29 – George Farquhar, Irish dramatist (b. 1677)
- May 3 – Michiel de Swaen, Flemish poet (b. 1654)
- May 9 – Dieterich Buxtehude, German composer (b. c. 1637)
- May 10 – Johann Ernst III, Duke of Saxe-Weimar (b. 1664)
- May 19 – Jean II d'Estrées, French noble (b. 1624)
- May 21 – Joan Geelvinck, Dutch politician (b. 1644)
- May 24 – Henri Albert de La Grange d'Arquien, French Catholic cardinal (b. 1613)
- May 27 – Françoise-Athénaïs de Rochechouart de Mortemart, Marquise de Montespan, mistress of King Louis XIV of France (b. 1641)
- May 31 – Simon Patrick, English theologian and bishop (b. 1626)
- June 8 – Muhammad Azam Shah, Mughal emperor (b. 1653)
- June 15 – Giorgio Baglivi, Armenian doctor and writer (b. 1668)
- June 21 – Robert Phelips, English politician (b. 1619)
- June 23 – John Mill, English theologian (b. c. 1645)
- June 27 – Johann Zahn, German author (b. 1641)
- August 7 – Henry Poley, English politician (b. 1654)
- August 18 – William Cavendish, 1st Duke of Devonshire, English soldier, statesman (b. 1640)
- August 20 – Nicolas Gigault, French organist and composer (b. 1627)
- September 12 – Samuel Willard, American theologian (b. 1640)
- September 15 – George Stepney, British poet and diplomat (b. 1663)
- September 21 – Wilhelmus Beekman, Dutch politician (b. 1623)
- September 24 – Vincenzo da Filicaja, Italian poet (b. 1642)
- October 10 – Johann Patkul, Livonian nobleman, politician (b. 1660)
- October 22 – Sir Cloudesley Shovell, British admiral, drowned (b. 1650)
- November 26 – Leonhard Dientzenhofer, German architect (b. 1660)
- November 27 – Fitz-John Winthrop, Governor of the Connecticut Colony (b. 1637)
- December 1 – Jeremiah Clarke, English composer and organist, suicide (b. 1674)
- December 24
  - Noël Coypel, French painter (b. 1628)
  - Karolina of Legnica-Brieg, Silesian noblewoman (b. 1652)
- December 27
  - Robert Leke, 3rd Earl of Scarsdale, English earl, politician (b. 1654)
  - Jean Mabillon, French palaeographer, diplomat (b. 1632)
- date unknown
  - Maria Clara Eimmart, German astronomer, engraver and designer (b. 1676)
  - Julie d'Aubigny, French swordswoman, opera singer (b. 1670)
  - Umze Peljor, Bhutanese head of government and monk
