= Henry Cunningham (disambiguation) =

Henry Cunningham (c. 1678–1736) was a Scottish Whig politician.

- Henry Cunningham (knight), Scottish noble
- H. S. Cunningham, British lawyer and writer
- Henry Cunningam, Irish Anglican priest
- Henry Cunningham (minister), American Baptist minister
