= Adamoli (surname) =

Adamoli is an Italian surname. Notable people with the surname include:

- Angela Adamoli (born 1972), Italian basketball player
- Carlo Adamoli (1894–1942), Italian aviator
- Gelasio Adamoli (1907–1978), Italian journalist
- Giulio Adamoli (1840–1926), Italian engineer and politician
- Pierre Adamoli (1707–1769), French bibliophile
- Umberto Adamoli (1878–1962), Italian politician

== See also ==
- Adamoli-Cattani fighter
