= Estofado =

Artistic technique

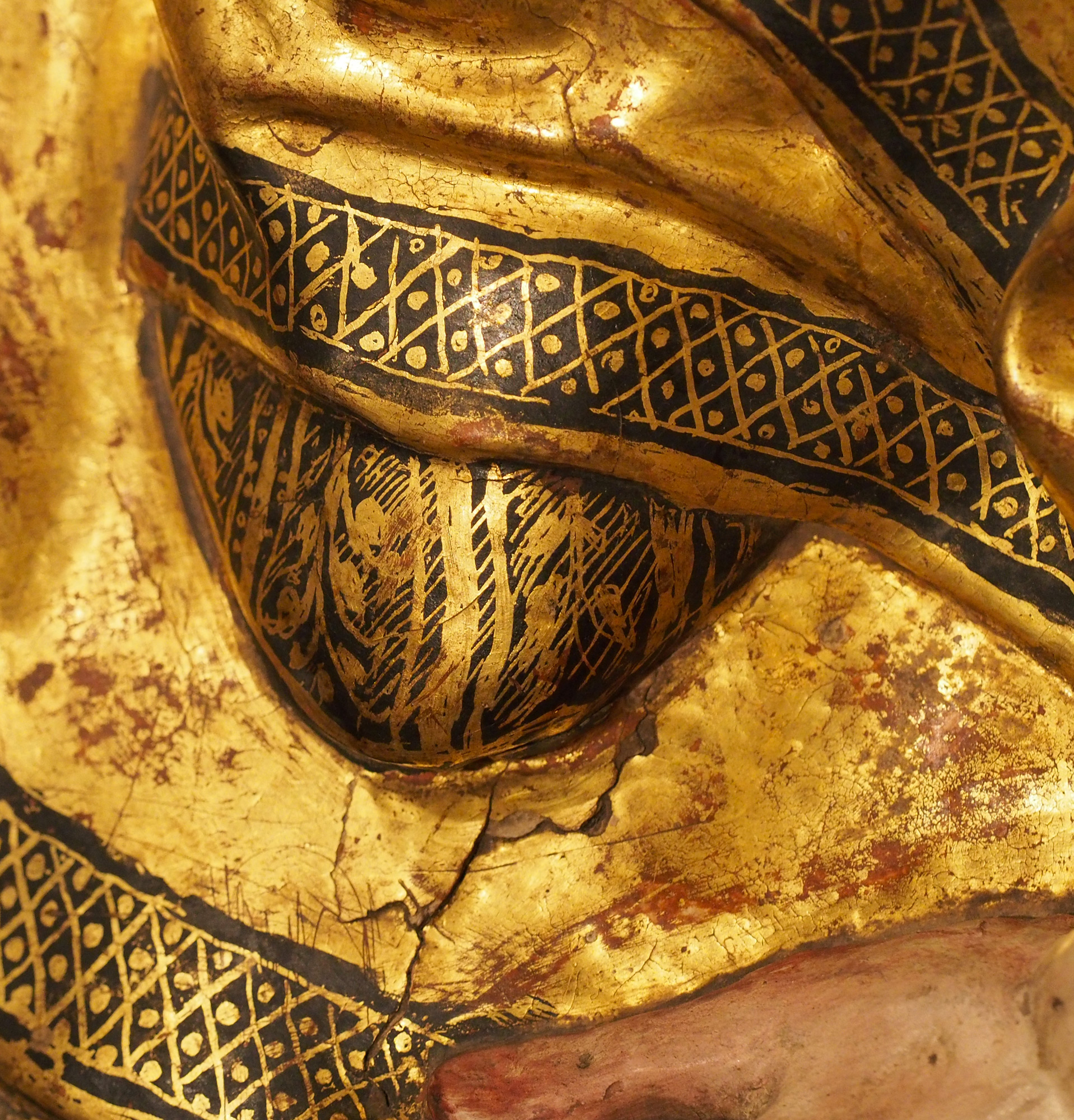
Detail from the altarpiece of the church of San Benito el Real (Valladolid), c. 1530

Estofado (Spanish: [estoˈfaðo]) is an artistic technique that imitates the appearance of gold brocade. The term comes from the Italian "stoffa" (fabric) in reference to the fine textiles it seeks to reproduce. Its origin is found in the Gothic period. Its use became more popular during the Renaissance and Baroque periods, particularly in Spain and its cultural sphere of influence, where it became prevalent. While estofado is mostly used for wooden sculpture, either statuary in the round or reliefs, it can also be used on other mediums, such as stone sculptures or panel paintings.

In 1777 the "Real Academia de Bellas Artes de San Fernando" assumed the authority to approve all designs for new altarpieces, and according to the new Neoclassical tastes, required that polychrome wood should be replaced with "marble or other suitable stones". This shift in style caused the technique to be relegated to a secondary level, and to be seen as common or popular by the cultured society.

== Gallery ==
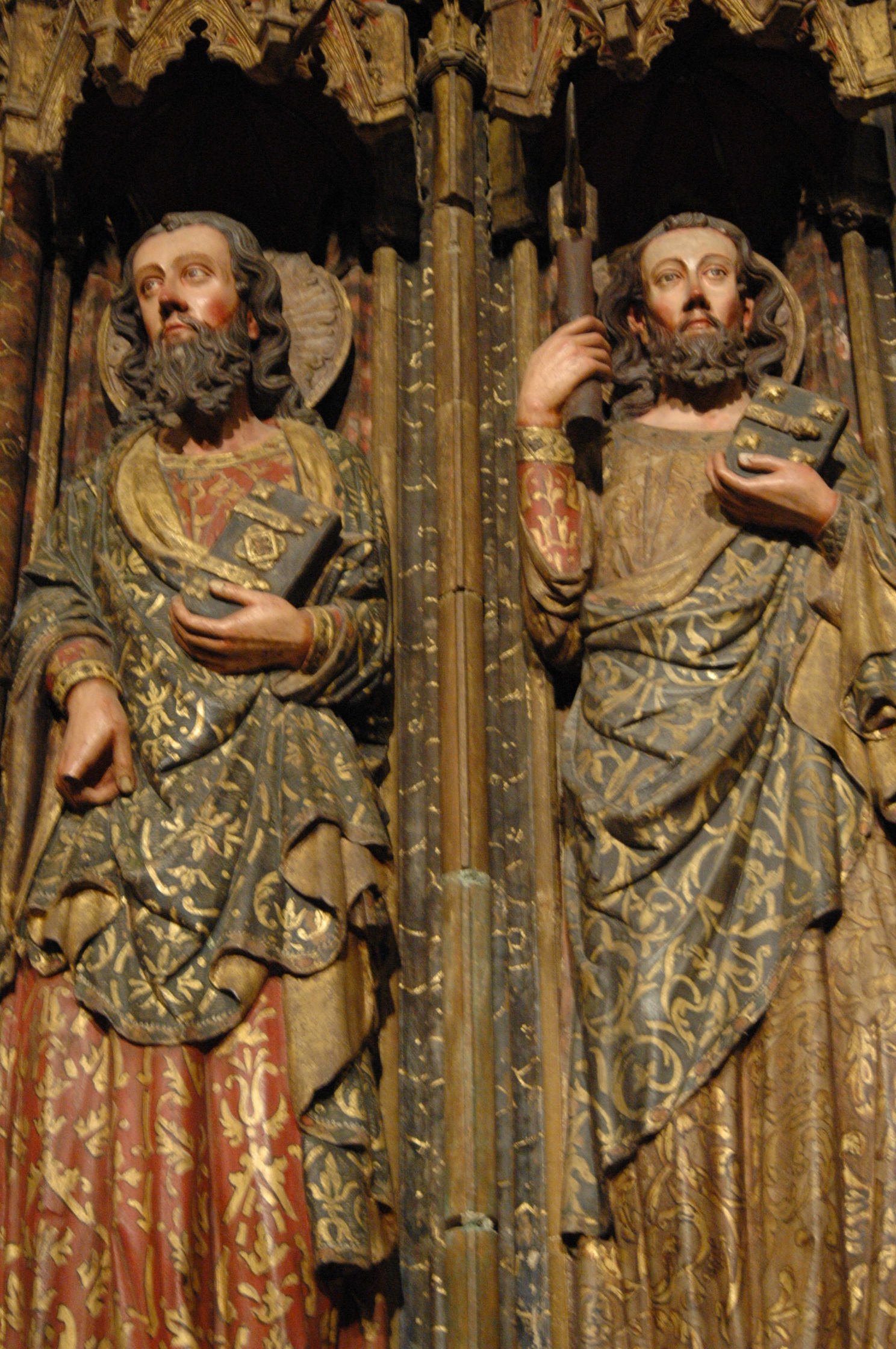
Apostles from the portal of the Church of Santa María de los Reyes, 14th century, Laguardia

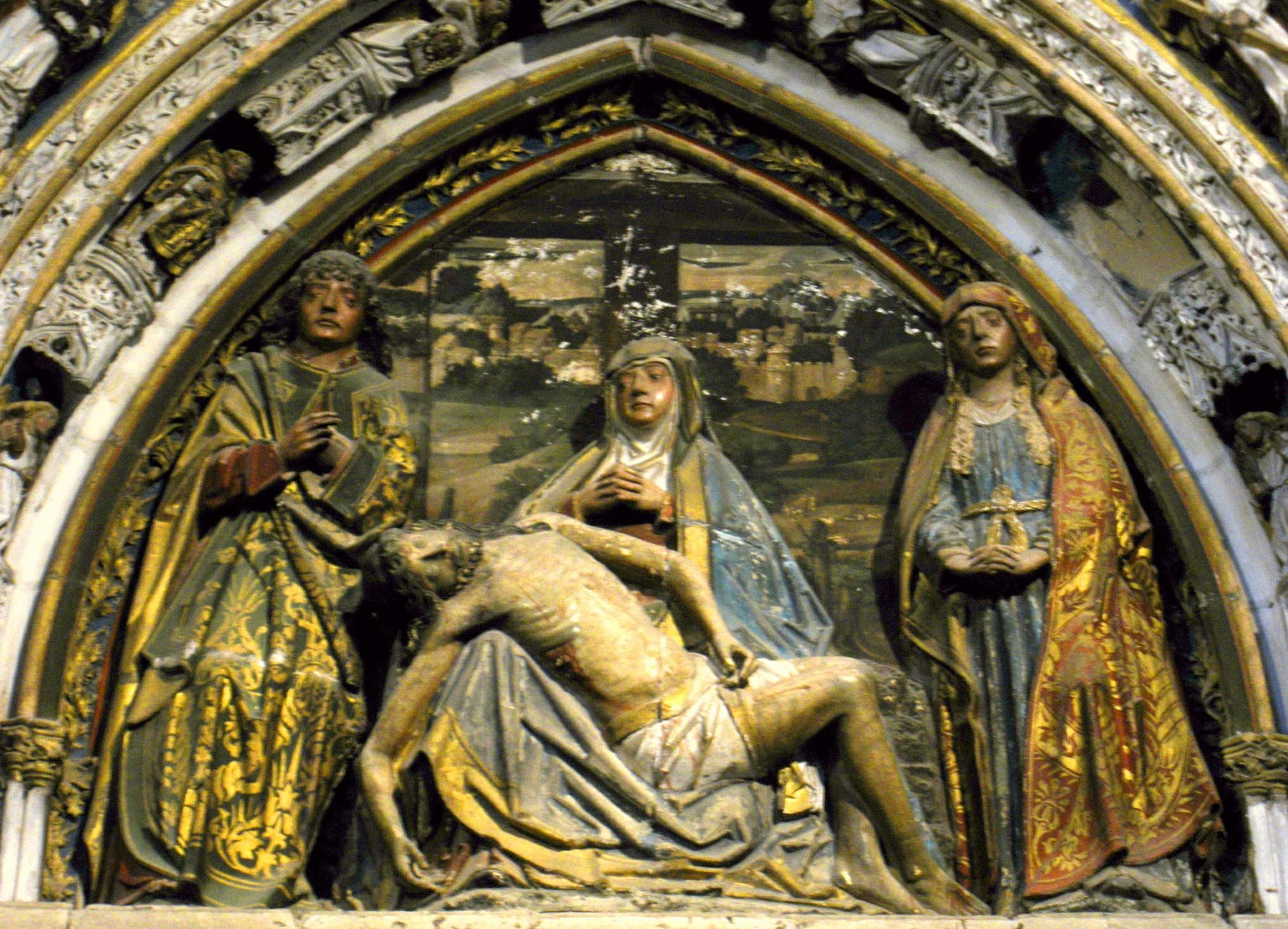
The deposition, by Sebastián de Almonacid, 15th century, Segovia Cathedral

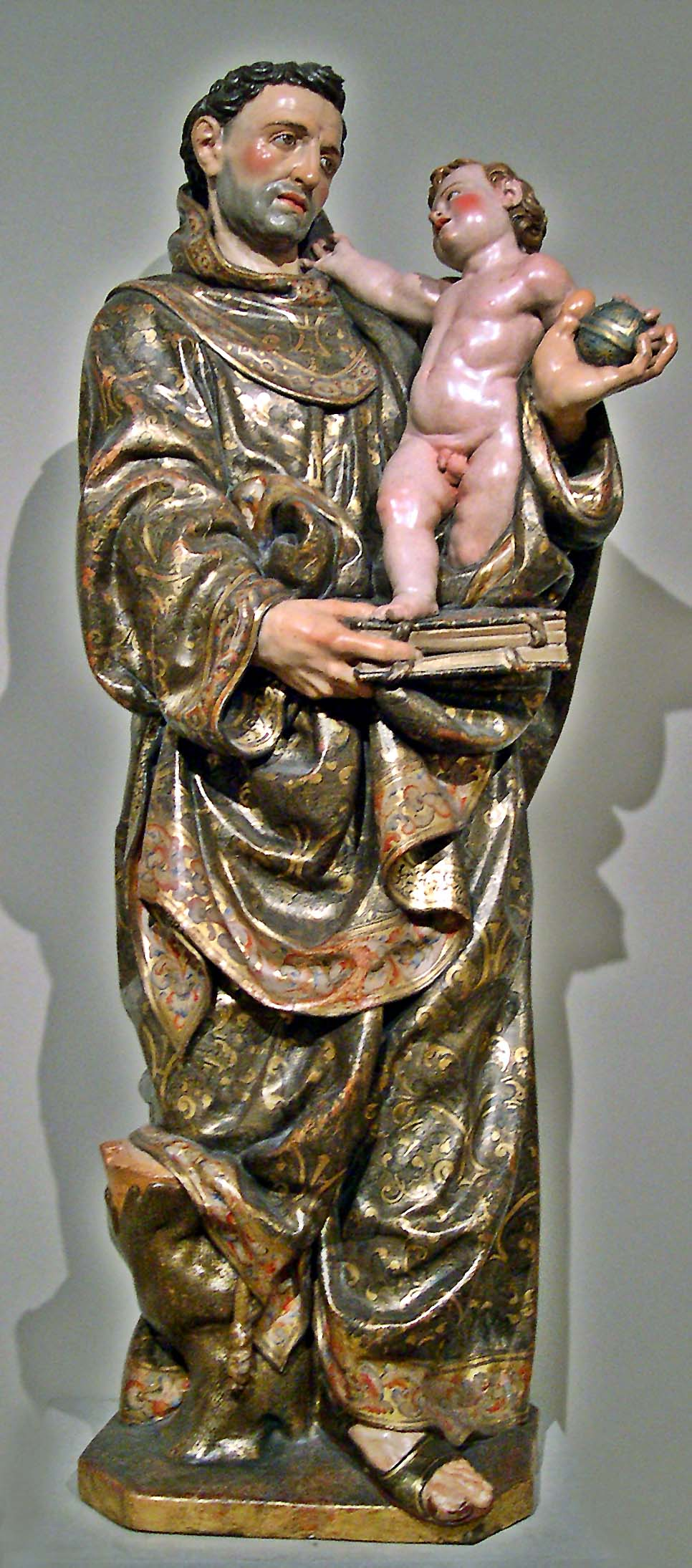
St. Anthony of Padua, Juan de Juni, 1540 National Museum of Sculpture, Valladolid

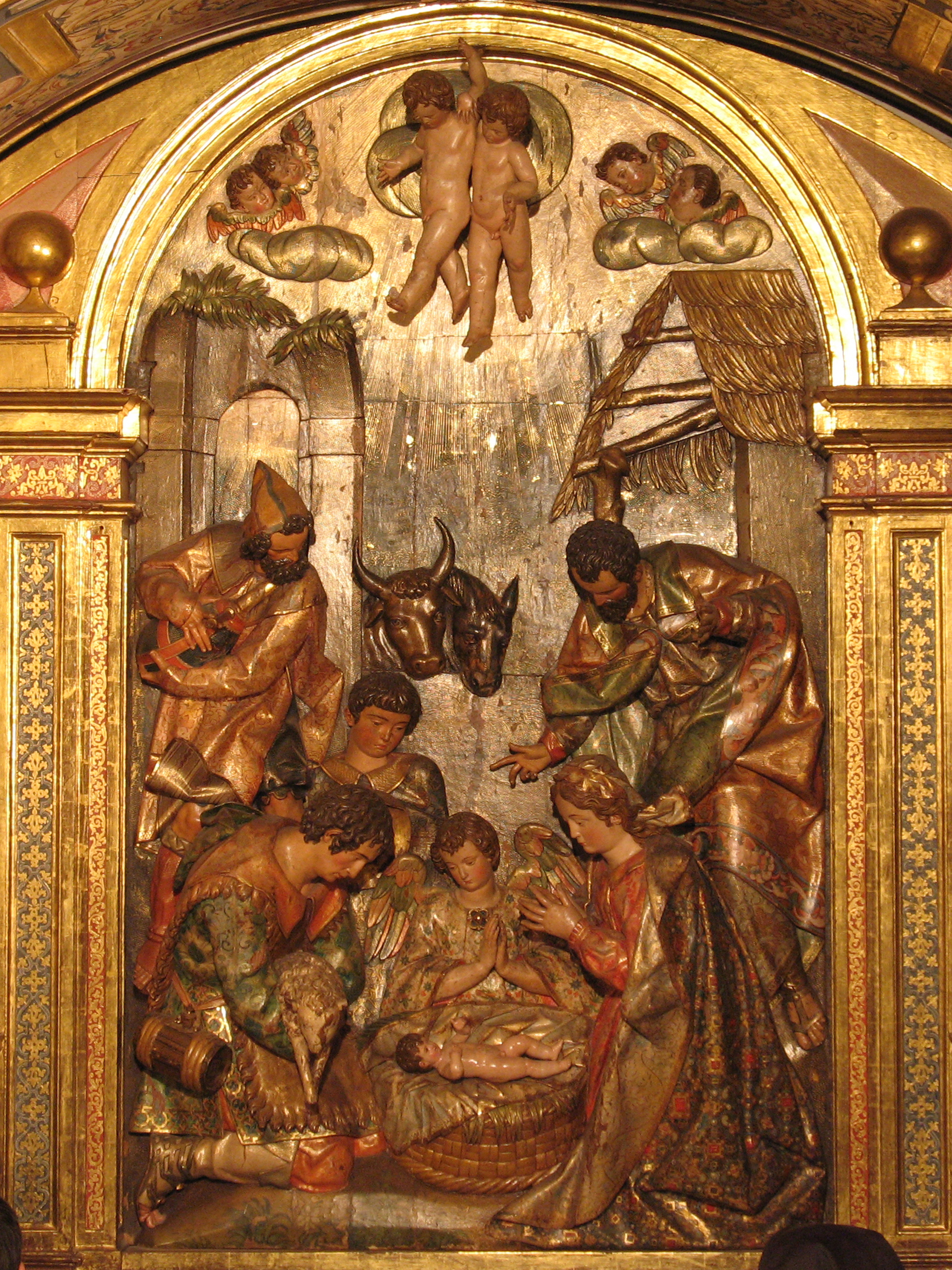
The Nativity by Gregorio Fernández,1614, Monastery of Santa María la Real de las Huelgas, Valladolid

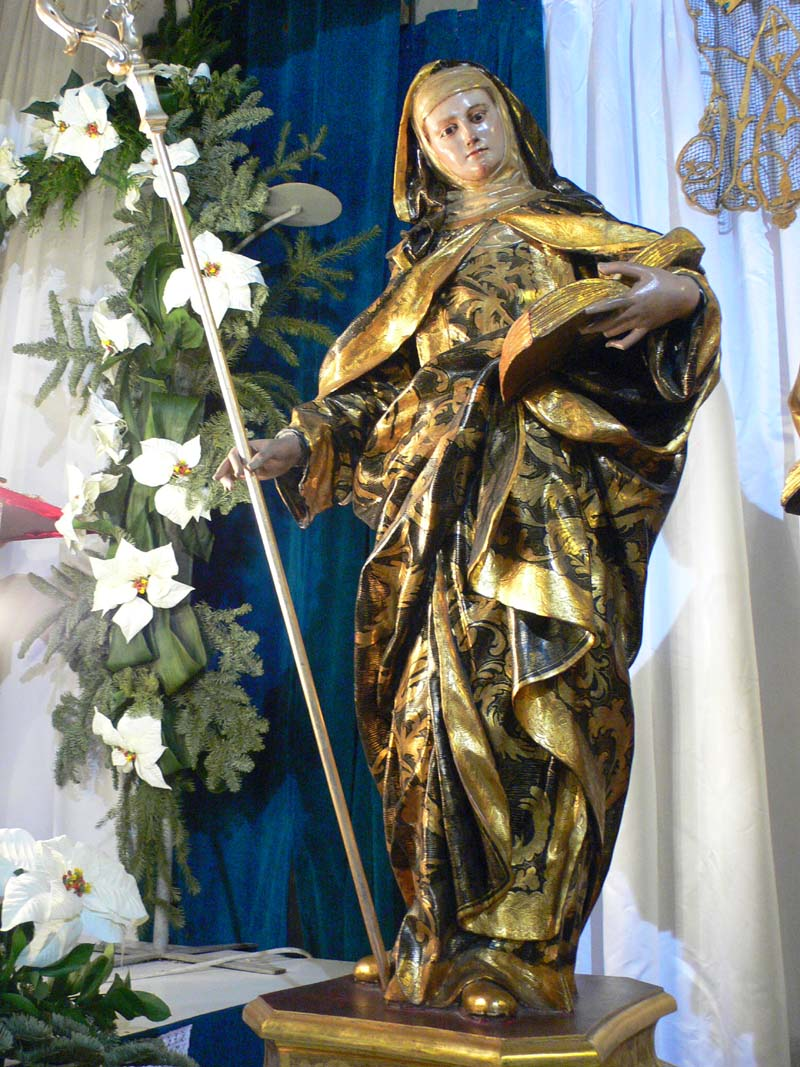
Saint Florentina, by Francisco Salzillo, 1755, church of Santa María de Gracia in Cartagena

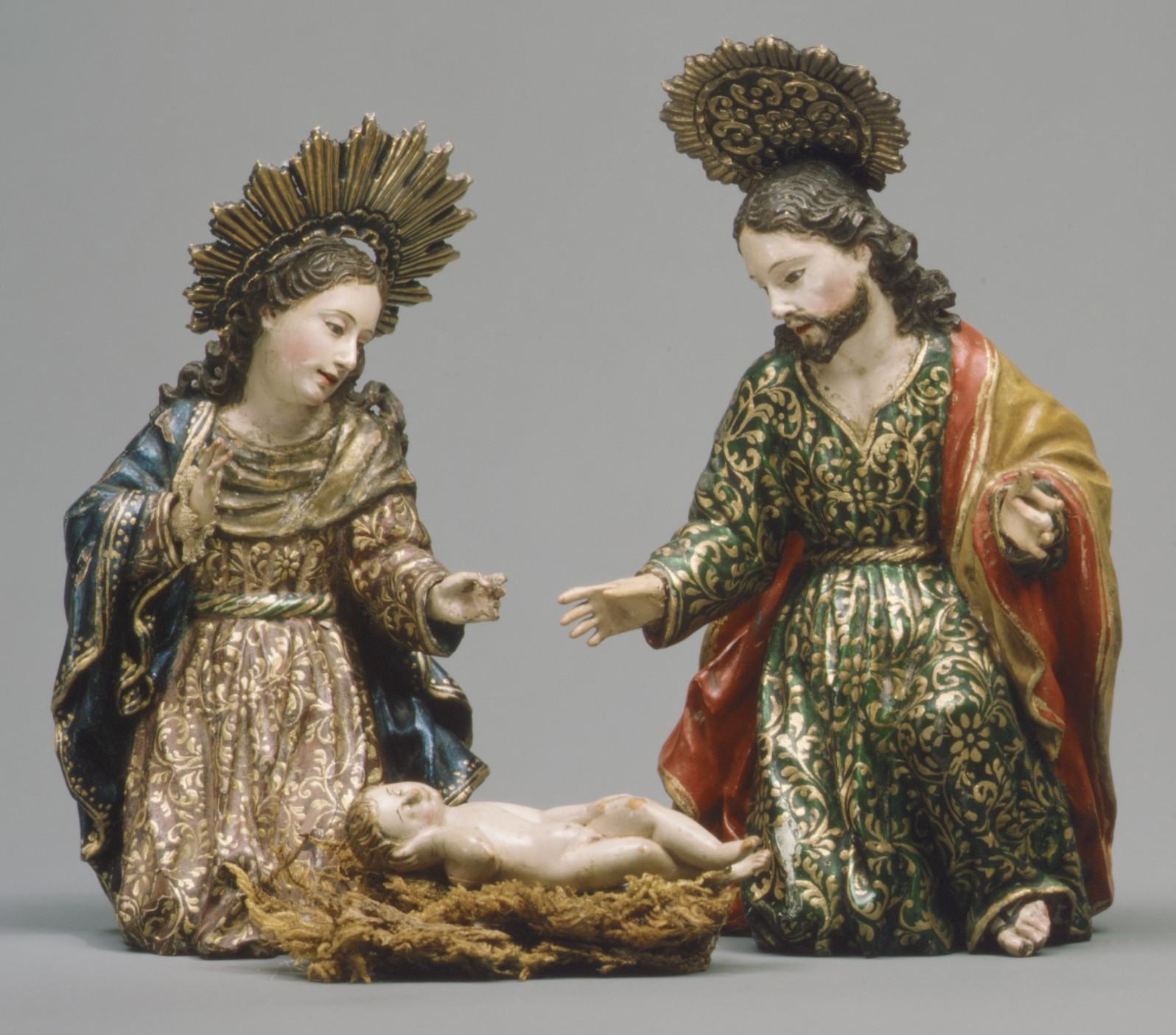
Nativity set by Manuel Chili Caspicara, 18th century Quito School, at the New York Metropolitan Museum of Art
