= Church of Jesús, Murcia =

Church in Murcia, Spain

The Church of Jesús is a Baroque-style, Roman Catholic church located in the Plaza San Agustin in the city of Murcia, in the Region of Murcia in Spain. The church housed the Confraternity titled Real y Muy Ilustre Cofradía de Nuestro Padre Jesús Nazareno. It still houses the venerated and elaborate processional wood statues of Francisco Salzillo, depicting the Passion of Christ, paraded during Holy Week. The interior has paintings (1792) by Pablo Sístori. It is now part of the Museo Salzillo.

Construction of the octagonal church was begun in 1670, but only completed at the end of the century.
