= Olivier de Vézin =

- Born: 28 April 1707; Aingoulaincourt, Haute-Marne, France
- Died: 20 April 1776 (aged 68); New Orleans, Louisiana
- Occupations: ironmaster, surveyor

Pierre-François Olivier de Vézin (also Vésin and Vézain) (28 April 1707 – 20 April 1776) was a Canadian ironmaster and chief surveyor of Louisiana sent by King Louis XIV. He served in the Cabildo as chief councilor and died in New Orleans 20 April 1776. He married Marie-Joseph Duplessis, daughter of Jean-Baptiste Gastineau Duplessis. His children, grandchildren, many generations were established, well known in New Orleans. Some include Gerard de Marigny de Mandaville, P.G.T. Beauragaurd, C.C. Claiborne, Francois -Marie Chevalier di Reggio, and many more. Pierre-François' daughter Victore-Francios, became mother superior at Ursulines Convent and led prayers in the streets in the Battle of New Orleans. She is responsible for the veneration of Our Lady of Prompt Succor mass at Thanksgiving that is still celebrated on 8 January annually.

== Early years ==
Olivier de Vézin was born in Aingoulaincourt, Haute-Marne, France to Hugues Olivier and Louise Le Roux. He became an ironmaster, first working in Sionne, France. He was later hired to investigate the Forges du Saint-Maurice in New France, which had been abandoned since 1733. Vézin left France on the Héros and arrived in Quebec on 3 September 1735. After a month of investigation, Olivier de Vézin sent his report to French Minister of the Marine, Jean-Frédéric Phélypeaux. He appended a cost estimate for reusing the ironworks and began overseeing the development himself.

== Career ==
Olivier de Vézin and two former partners in the mill agreed to collaborate, receiving royal approval in 1736. The company was formed on 16 October 1736 with a total of five partners, who formally signed the paperwork establishing the Society and Company for the Exploitation of Iron Mines on 11 February 1737. Despite having friendly relations with colonial officials, the projects did not progress smoothly and went over budget. The Intendant, Gilles Hocquart, questioned Olivier de Vézin's competence, a doubt which was justified as de Vézin had masked an error regarding the stream used in the ironworks. The ironworks' furnace was first lit in August 1738, and that month de Vézin became the company's director. The following year he retrieved more labourers from France, as well as his brother Sieur Darmeville. This was followed by violent disputes between de Vézin and his partners; the partners blamed Olivier de Vézin for the ironworks' lack of profit and ill-willed workers. With bankruptcy fast approaching Olivier de Vézin resigned on 13 October 1740 and immediately returned to France. In a letter to the king dated 13 March 1742, de Vézin offered to return to the Saint-Maurice ironworks. The king instead commissioned Olivier de Vézin as chief road officer in Louisiana. This position dissatisfied Olivier de Vézin, but he went to Louisiana, where he unsuccessfully attempted to exploit iron mine. He may have died in France.
