= Dieterich Bernhard Ludewig =

German organist

- Born: November 7, 1707; Thonhausen, near Ronneburg, Germany
- Died: February 27, 1740 (aged 32); Schmölln, Germany
- Education: Leipzig University
- Occupation: Organist
- Known for: Student of Johann Sebastian Bach

Dieterich Bernhard Ludewig (7 November 1707 – 27 February 1740) was a German organist. He was born in Thonhausen, near Ronneburg and 50 kilometres (31 mi) south of Leipzig.

He studied theology at Leipzig University and was one of Johann Sebastian Bach's pupils from 1731 to 1737; he also tutored Bach's younger children. Bach provided testimonials for him in March and October 1737, in which he referred to Ludewig's capabilities in singing and playing various instruments and to his participation in the activities of Bach's collegium musicum. Ludewig was unsuccessful in his applications for posts at Löbau and Zörbig, but on 31 March 1738 he was appointed town organist at Schmölln, not far from his native village.

He died two years later, at the age of 32.
