= Francisco Salzillo =

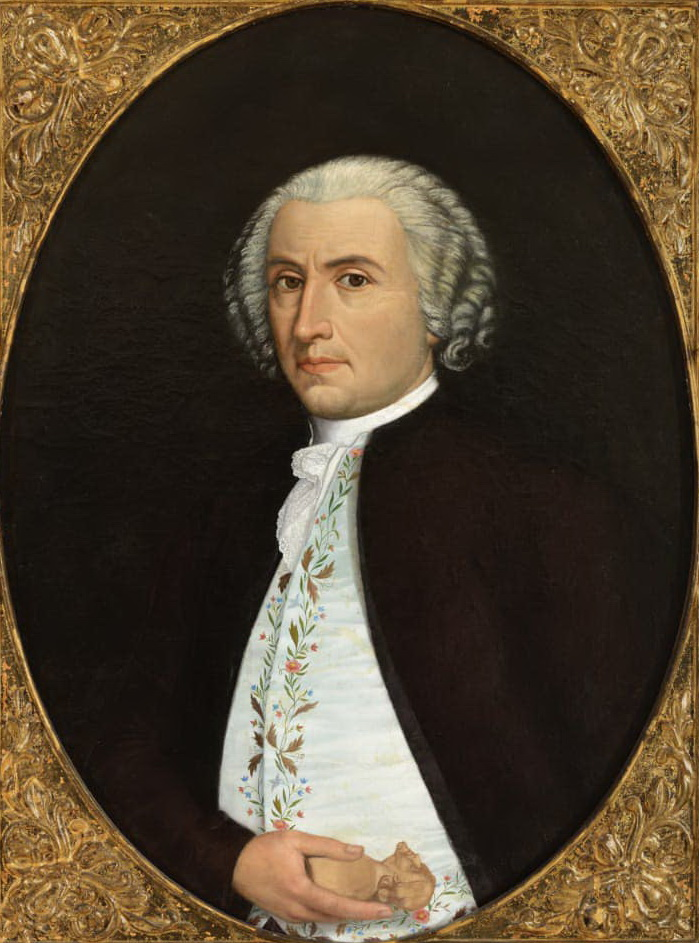
- Portrait of Francisco Salzillo, Juan Albacete (1823–1883) (Royal Economic Society of Friends of the Country of Murcia).
- Born: Francisco Salzillo y Alcaraz; 12 May 1707; Murcia, (Spain)
- Died: 2 March 1783 (aged 75); Murcia, (Spain)
- Known for: sculpture
- Movement: baroque

Francisco Salzillo y Alcaraz (12 May 1707 – 2 March 1783) was a Spanish sculptor. He is the most representative Spanish image-maker of the 18th century and one of greatest of the Baroque. Francisco Salzillo worked exclusively on religious themes, and almost always in polychromed wood. He made hundreds of pieces that are distributed throughout the Region of Murcia and some in bordering provinces. The Spanish Civil War (1936–1939) caused the destruction of many of the works of Salzillo. Some of his masterpieces include his nonprocessional religious work, his processional work, and his great Nativity scene.

== Biography ==
He was born in Murcia to an Italian wood sculptor, Nicolás Salzillo. At the age of twenty he completed the statue of St Agnes of Montepulciano, which had been begun for the Dominicans at Murcia by his father. On the death of the latter the care of the family fell upon Francisco, who with the help of his brothers and sisters organized a workshop. In 1765 he also founded a small academy, which, however, was speedily dissolved owing to disunion among the members. In the Ermita de Jesús in Murcia may be seen Salzillo's scenes from the Passion of Our Lord, a vast work in which all the sculptor's qualities and defects are revealed. In the church of San Miguel are an Immaculate Conception and a St Francis. Mention should also be made of the Christ at the Well in the church of Santa María de las Gracias in Murcia, and of the sculptures in San Pedro and in the Capuchin monastery in Murcia. Salzillo mainly worked in wood and carved "in the round", after which was his work was gilded and polychromed using a technique called estofado. The attribution of the stone sculptures on the facade of St Nicolas's Church in Murcia to him, is purely conjectural. A number of sculptures in Santiago Apóstol, Lorquí are attributed to him or his school.

He died in Murcia.

== Main works ==
Unlike the great sculptors of the 17th century, like Juan Martínez Montañés or Gregorio Fernández, Francisco Salzillo did not dwell overly on the dramatic aspects of the scenes he depicted, but explored naturalistic concepts of idealized beauty that heralded the transition from the Baroque style into the Rococó and Neoclasicism. Salzillo founded the so-called Murcian School of Sculpture that extended beyond its time and that has remained effective to the present time, because both his first followers and those who have followed to date have perpetuated the iconographic and stylistic models and types of Salzillo. There is a museum in Murcia dedicated to Salzillo. His main works are:

- La Cena (The Last Supper): it was created in 1763 and it is composed of thirteen figures (Jesus and 12 Apostles) seated around a table.
- La Oración del Huerto (The Agony in the Garden): created in 1754, in it can be seen, on the one hand, an angel showing the chalice to Jesus, and on the other hand, the scene of the three sleeping apostles under the palm.
- El Prendimiento or El Beso de Judas (The Arrest or The Kiss of Judas): created in 1754, it contrasts the faces of Jesus and Judas, allowing a comparison of beauty and kindness of the former as opposed to the ugliness and evil of the latter.
- Jesús en la Columna or Los Azotes (Jesus at the Column or The Flagellation): sculpted in 1777, it shows the face of Jesus filled with serenity and resignation enduring the lashes which he receives.
- Santa Mujer Verónica (The Holy Woman Veronica): created in 1755, it shows Saint Veronica with a dolorous expression, taking between her hands the cloth on which is miraculously imprinted the face of Jesus.
- La Caída (The Fall): created in 1752.
- San Juan (Saint John): created in 1756.
- La Dolorosa (The Virgin of Sorrows): created in 1756.
- El Belén (The Nativity Scene): created between 1780 and 1800, it was begun by Salzillo and extended by his disciple Roque López. It is a set of 556 mud figures of about 30 cm. of height.
- Numerous preparatory sketches modeled in terracotta.

== Gallery ==
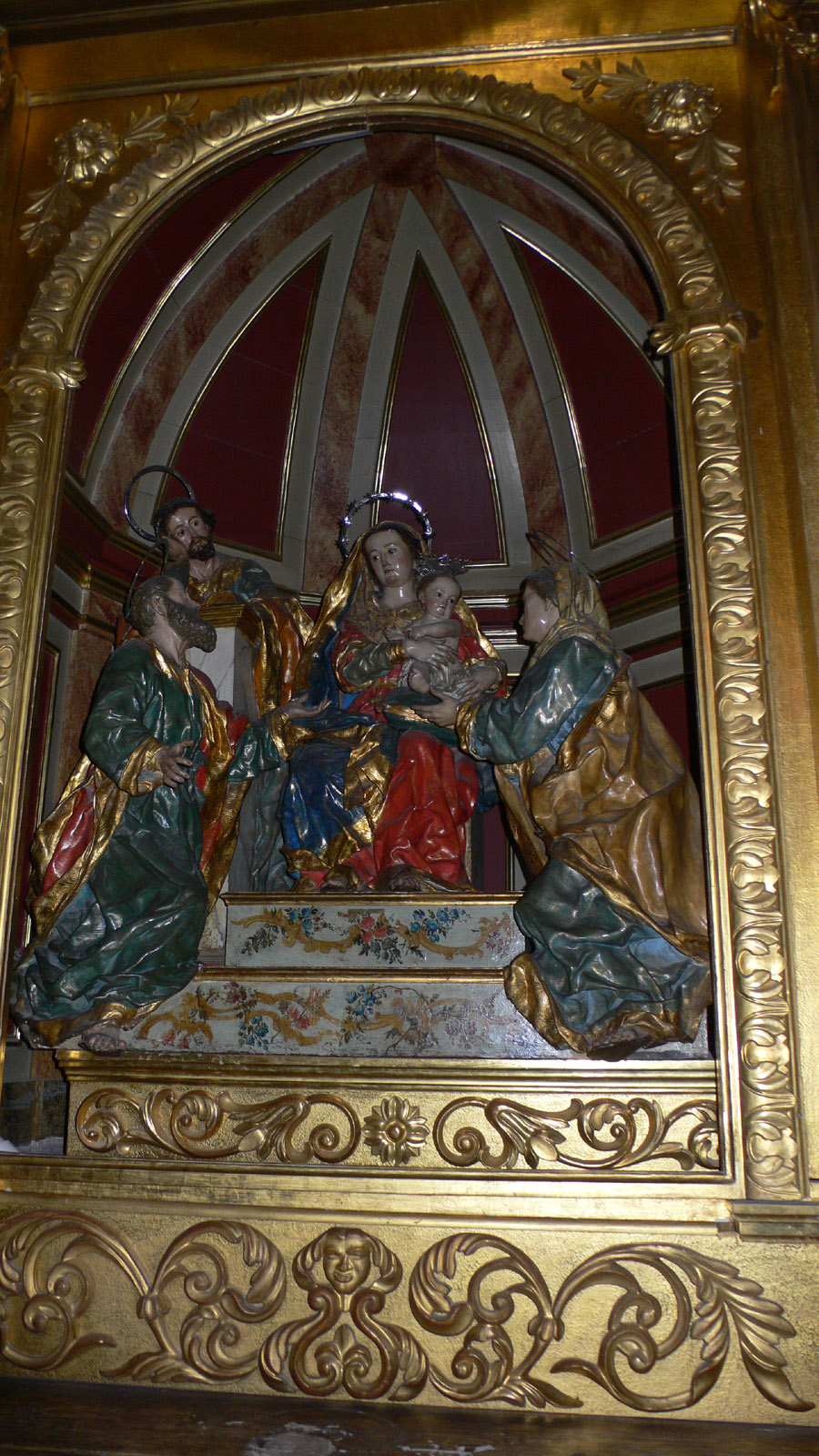
Sagrada Familia. h.1735. Igl. S.Miguel de Murcia

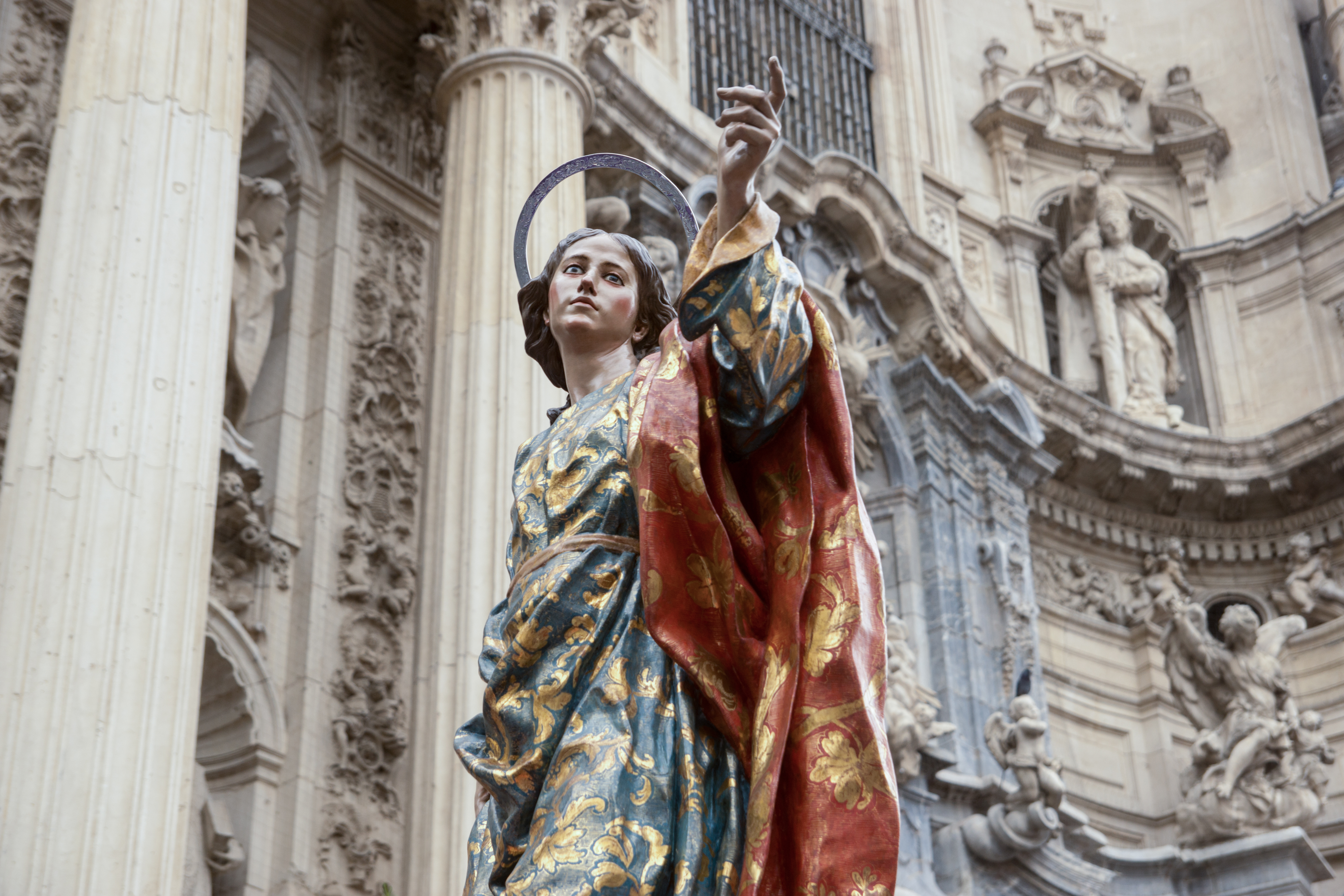
San Juan. 1756. Museo Salzillo.

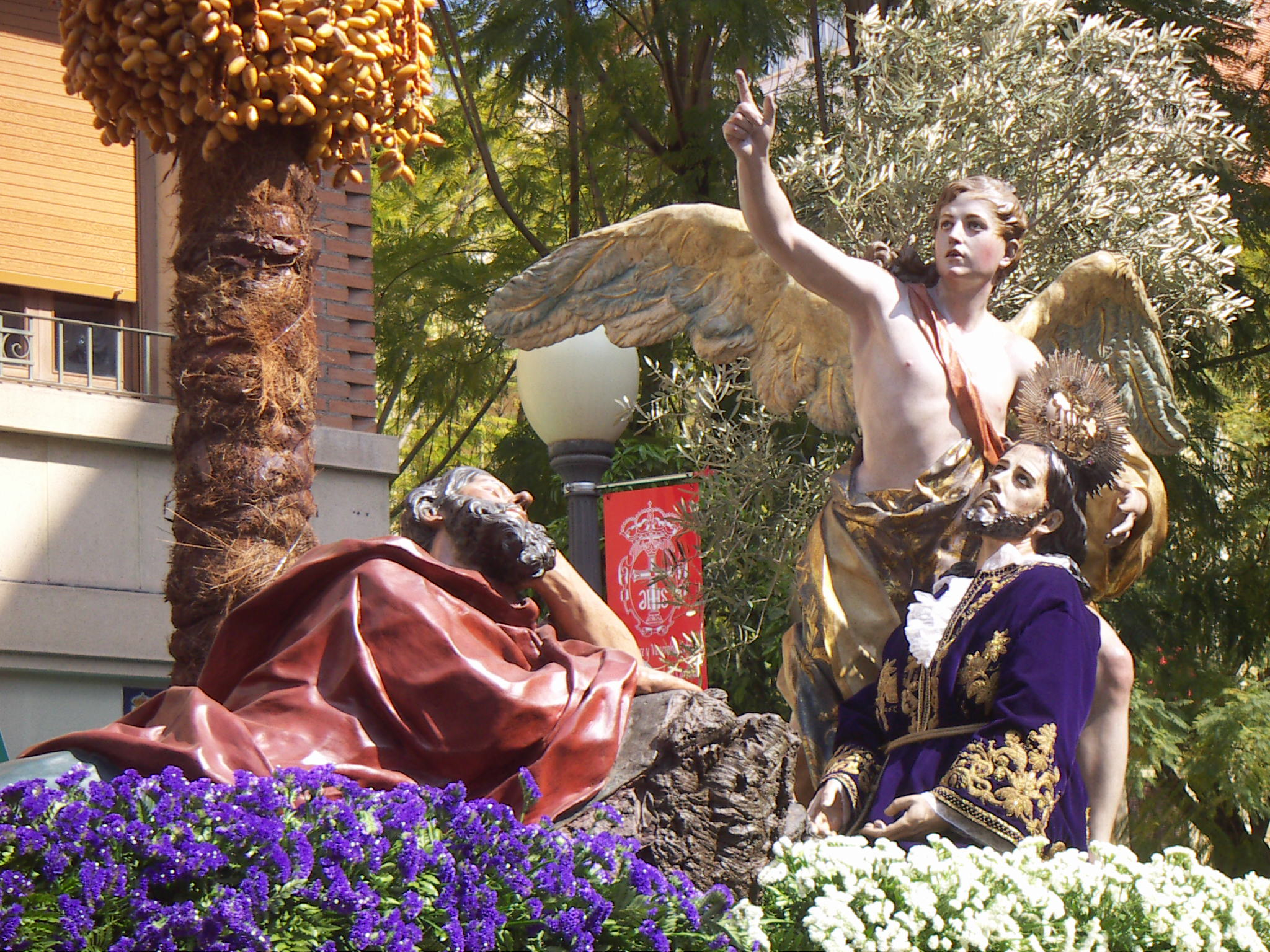
La Oración en el Huerto. 1752. Museo Salzillo.

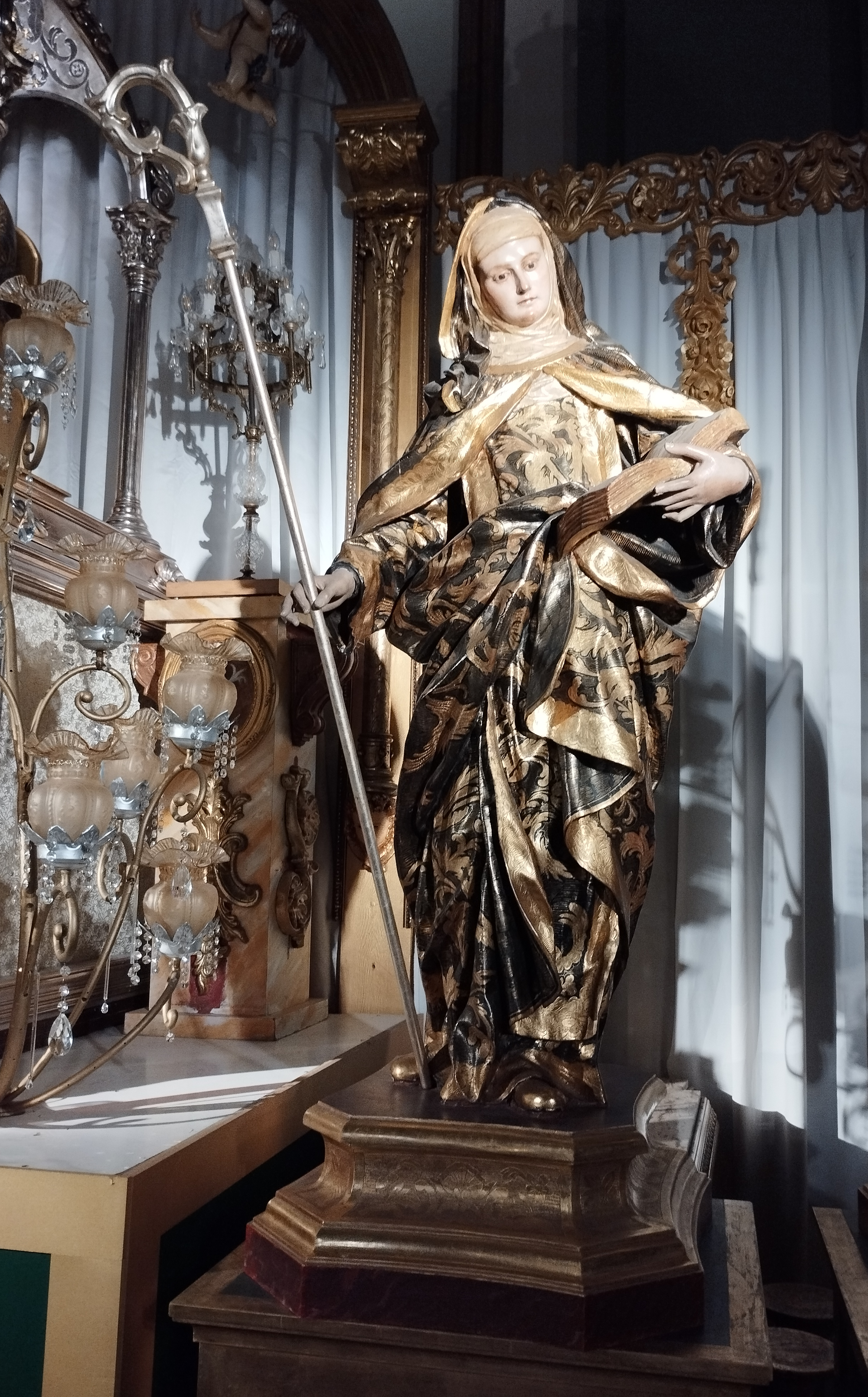
Sta.Florentina. 1755. Iglesia de Sta.María de Gracia en Cartagena.

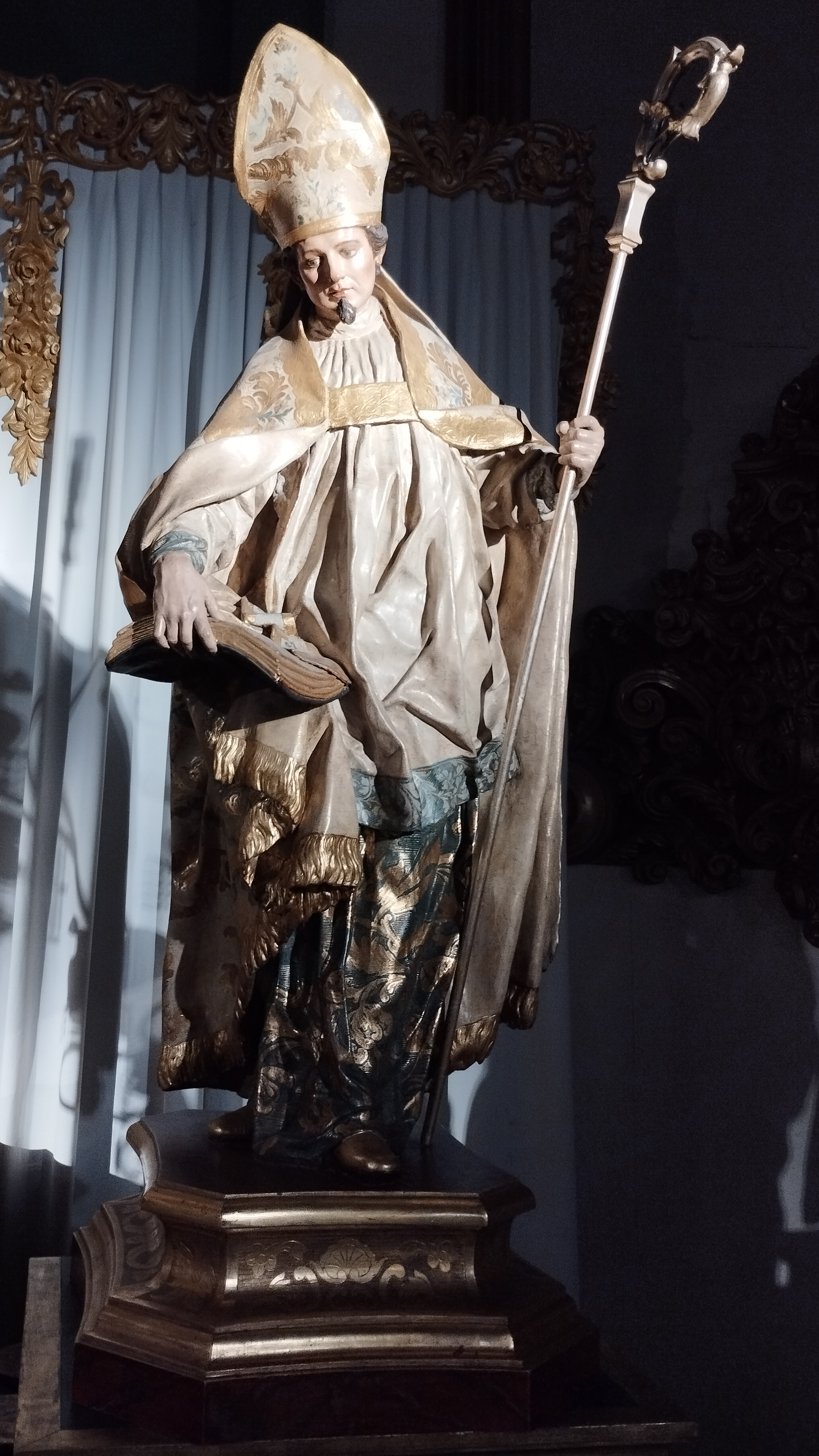
S.Isidoro. 1755. Iglesia de Sta.María de Gracia en Cartagena.

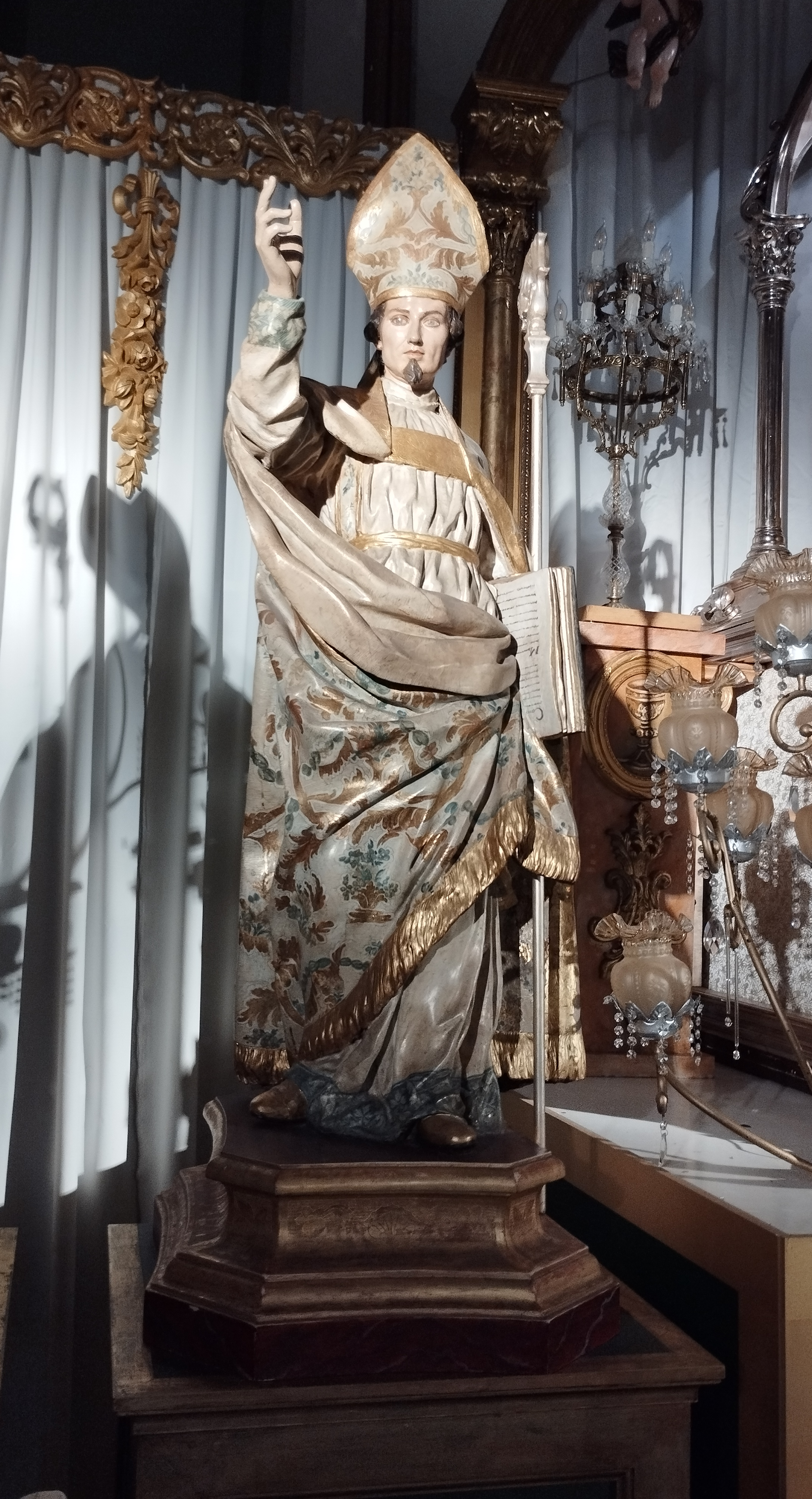
S.Fulgencio. 1755. Iglesia de Sta.María de Gracia en Cartagena.

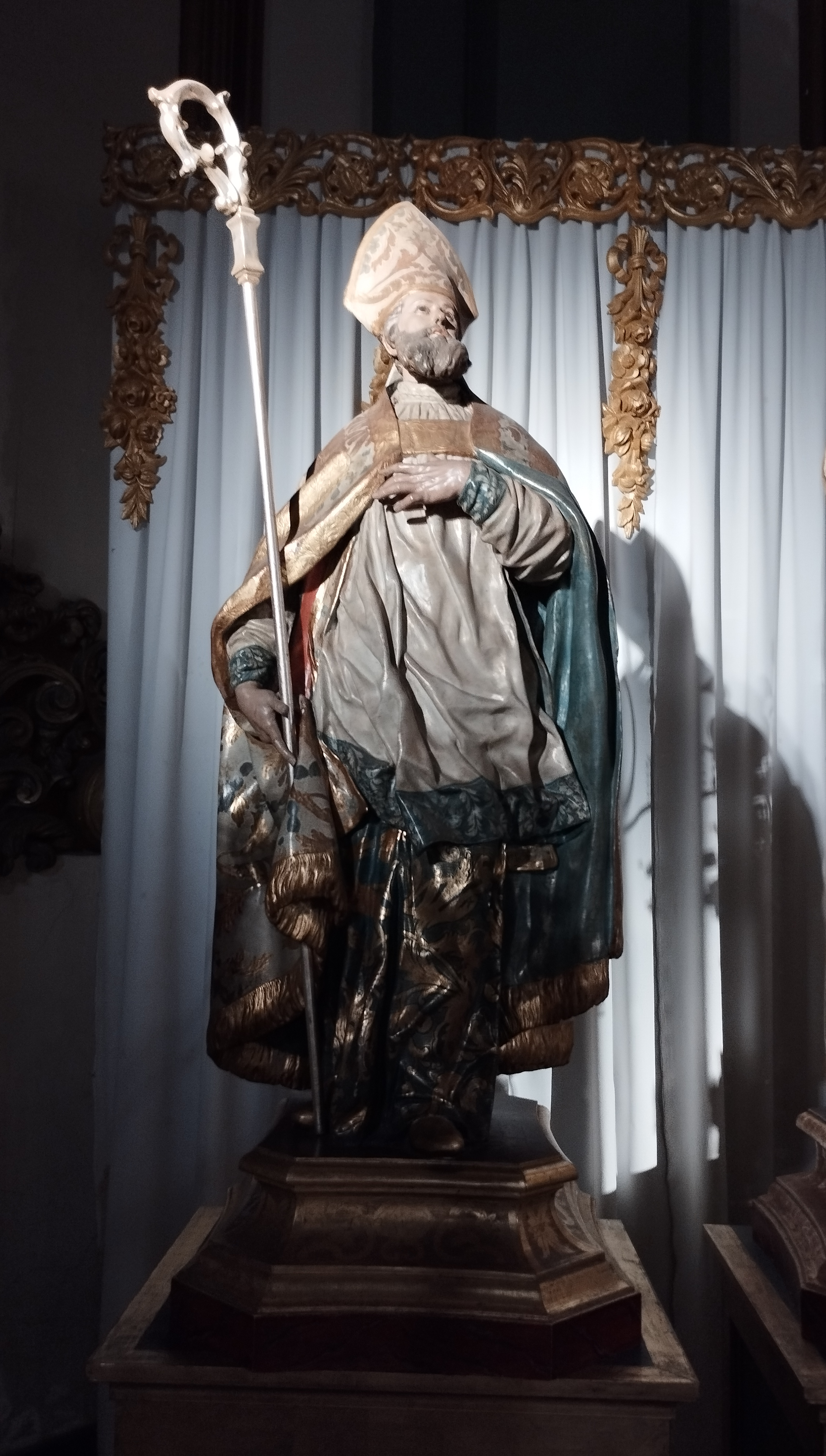
S.Leandro. 1755. Iglesia de Sta.María de Gracia en Cartagena.
