= Benito Fernández de Santa Ana =

Franciscan friar (1707–1761)

Benito Fernández y Rana de Santa Ana (June 4, 1707 – March or April 1761) was a Franciscan friar who served as president of the Texas missions of the College of Santa Cruz de Querétaro from 1734 to 1750 and played an important role in the early history of the Alamo Mission in San Antonio. Born in Berán, Spain, on June 4, 1707, he joined the Franciscan order and was ordained in 1731. He was despatched later that year to the San Antonio de Valero Mission in Texas, later known as the Alamo. At San Antonio, he helped to resolve disputes within the local Spanish community and brokered a peace with the Apache, who had been repeatedly attacking the mission. Santa Ana was an opponent of the enslavement of the Apache and believed that they could be peacefully induced to settle in the missions. In 1745, he personally convinced Viceroy Pedro Cebrián y Agustín to rescind a decree permitting the employment of mission Indians by farms in San Antonio. Santa Ana fell ill in February 1750 and retired from the presidency of the missions. He died in March or April 1761.
