= Joseph Johann Kauffmann =

Austrian artist (1707–1782)

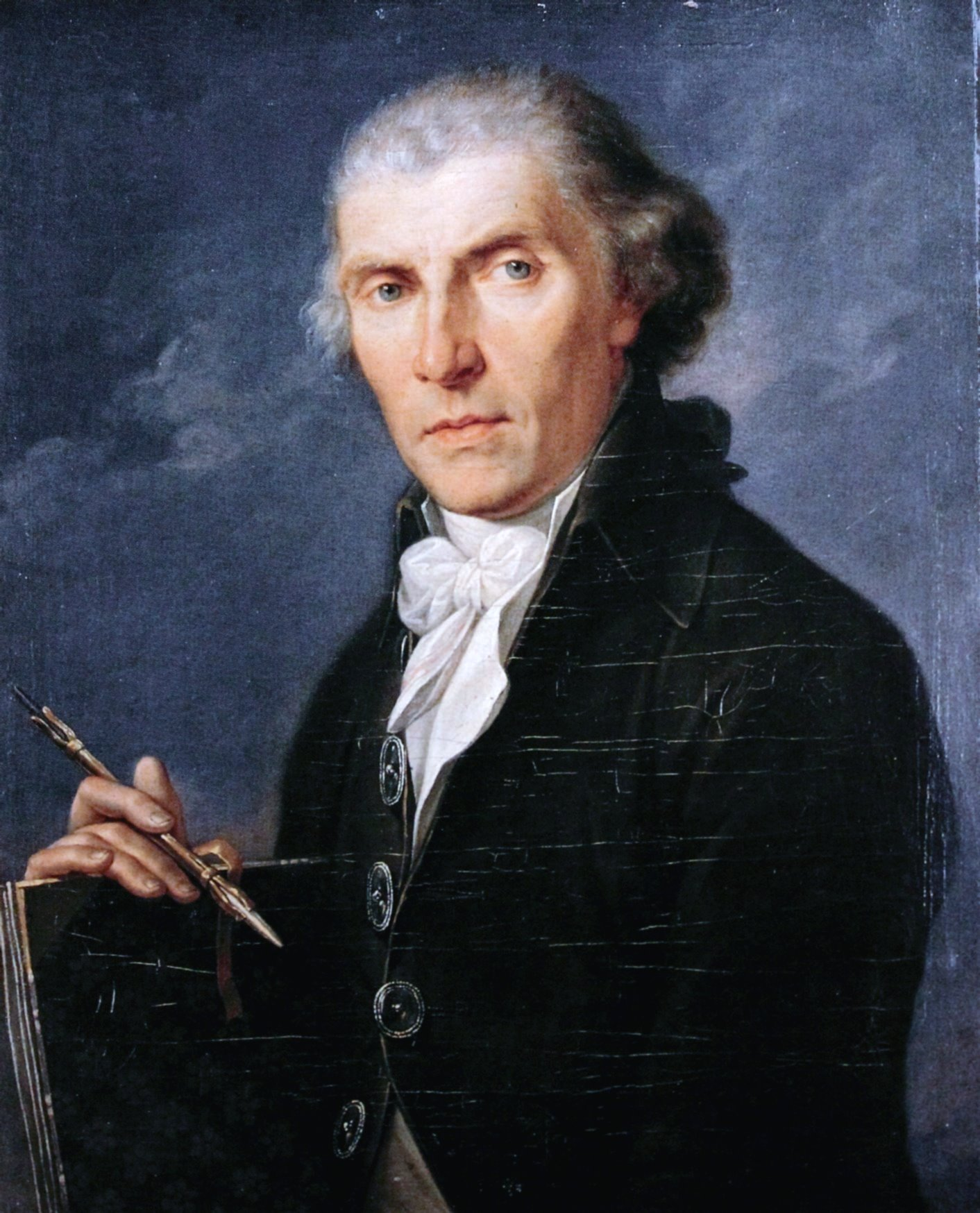
Portrait of Joseph Johann Kauffmann

Joseph Johann Kauffmann (27 February 1707 – 11 January 1782) was an Austrian painter known for his portraits, church decorations and castle depictions. Along with his wife Cleophea Lutz he had a single child, his daughter Angelika Kauffmann (*1741), who is also remembered as a painter.

== Life ==
Joseph Johann Kauffmann was born in Schwarzenberg, Austria, and is described as a relatively poor man with painting skills. The original family home was a small village in the Austrian Alps called Schwarzenberg, located in the state of Vorarlberg. In the years 1740 to 1742 he was in duty of the prince-bishop from Chur/Switzerland.

In 1755 the family moved to Milan, Italy, and lived there until the mother, Cleophea Lutz, died in 1757. After this, Kauffmann and daughter Angelika returned to Schwarzenberg. There they helped in painting the interiors of the recently heavily fire damaged local church house. The father concentrated on the general interior whilst his daughter worked on the images of the apostles. At a later time she donated the high altar piece in the form of paintings from her own hand.

In the same period in which the church painting took place the family also travelled the nearby northern lakeside of Lake Constance doing works for the Tettnang seated Montfort counts in the form of castle depictions and similar. They travelled further to Meersburg and even Konstanz.

In 1760, Kauffmann and Angelica left for Italy again in order to do studies on classical and Renaissance art there. During their travels they earned money by creating paintings of locals along their path. Up to 1766 they went to Rome with intermediate stops in Milan, Modena, Parma and Florence. On 5 October 1762 the daughter received honorable membership of the Accademia di Bologna. In 1764 this was topped by joining the Accademia di San Luca in Rome on a similar base.

The traveling Englishman and actor David Garrick gave the daughter the chance to paint a portrait of him which became one of her masterpieces, making her finally famous. On the recommendation of Lady Wentworth, both moved to London and stayed there starting in 1766.

Kauffmann was the person who taught his daughter painting starting at the age of 11. This education helped her greatly in her later career all across Europe including England and Italy up to becoming a founding member of the Royal Society of Arts. Even in his later years, some travels along with or for the purpose of meeting with his daughter have obviously taken place. Johann Joseph had a strong relation to Italy, evidenced not only by his time spent living and visiting there, but also in his successful recommendation to his daughter to marry the venetian painter Antonio Zucchi (1726–1795) as her second husband. The marriage took place in July 1781. As a result, father and the couple travelled south visiting Flandern, Schwarzenberg, Verona and Padua. In October of the same year they arrived in Venice, where Johann Joseph Kauffmann died in the following January.
