= Louis de Cardevac, marquis d'Havrincourt =

French nobleman, soldier and diplomat

De Cardevac arms

Louis de Cardevac, marquis d'Havrincourt (born 20 June 1707 at Havrincourt; died 15 February 1767 in The Hague) was a French nobleman, soldier and diplomat.

Having been promoted lieutenant-general of the French Army, he was sent as King Louis XV's envoy to London in 1748 before being appointed French Ambassador to Sweden between 1749 and 1763. He was then posted to the Netherlands as French Ambassador.

He married, on 10 June 1737, Antoinette-Barbonne-Thérèse (died 1780 in Paris), only child of Jacques-Vincent de Languet, comte de Gergy, who was French Ambassador to the Doge of Venice. by whom he had four children, including Anne-Gabriel-Pierre de Cardevac, who succeeded him as 2nd Marquis and via his mother as Comte de Gergy etc.

== See also ==
- List of French Ambassadors to Great Britain
