= Guillaume Barthez de Marmorières =

French civil engineer (1707–1799)

- Guillaume Barthez
- Born: 2 March 1707; Narbonne (France)
- Died: 17 January 1799 (aged 91); Narbonne (France)
- Citizenship: France
- Known for: Two entries in the Encyclopédie of Diderot and d’Alembert.
- Children: Paul Joseph Barthez
- Scientific career
- Fields: Civil engineer
- Institutions: Province of Languedoc

Guillaume Barthez de Marmorières (2 March 1707 – 11 January 1799) was a French civil engineer.

== Biography ==
Son of an architect, he was born in Narbonne in southern France. He became a civil engineer for the province of Languedoc. He was elected to the Académie des sciences et lettres de Montpellier (fr), gained a wide reputation through either his writings or the works he supervised.

He was called upon to edit or contribute two entries in the Encyclopédie of Diderot and d’Alembert.

He was made a hereditary nobleman de Marmorières in 1780 by letters patent of Louis XVI.

He was the father of Paul Joseph Barthez physician, physiologist and encyclopedist who developed the biological theory known as vitalism.

He died in Narbonne in 1799 at the age of 91.

== Selected works ==
- Essai sur divers avantages que l'on pourrait retirer de la côte de Languedoc relativement à la navigation et à l'agriculture. De l'imprimerie d'Yverdon. 1769.
- Mémoires d’agriculture et de mécanique, avec les moyens de remédier aux abus du jaugeage des vaisseaux dans tous les ports du roi, Paris, 1763, in-8°
- Traité des moyens de rendre la côte de la province de Languedoc plus florissante que jamais. De l'Imprimerie de Jean Martel ainé imprimeur ordinaire du roi & de noffeigneurs des Etats-Généranx de la province de Languedoc. 1786. pp. 5–.
- Nouveaux essais sur la noblesse. Société Typographique. 1781.
