= Abbé François Blanchet =

French littérateur

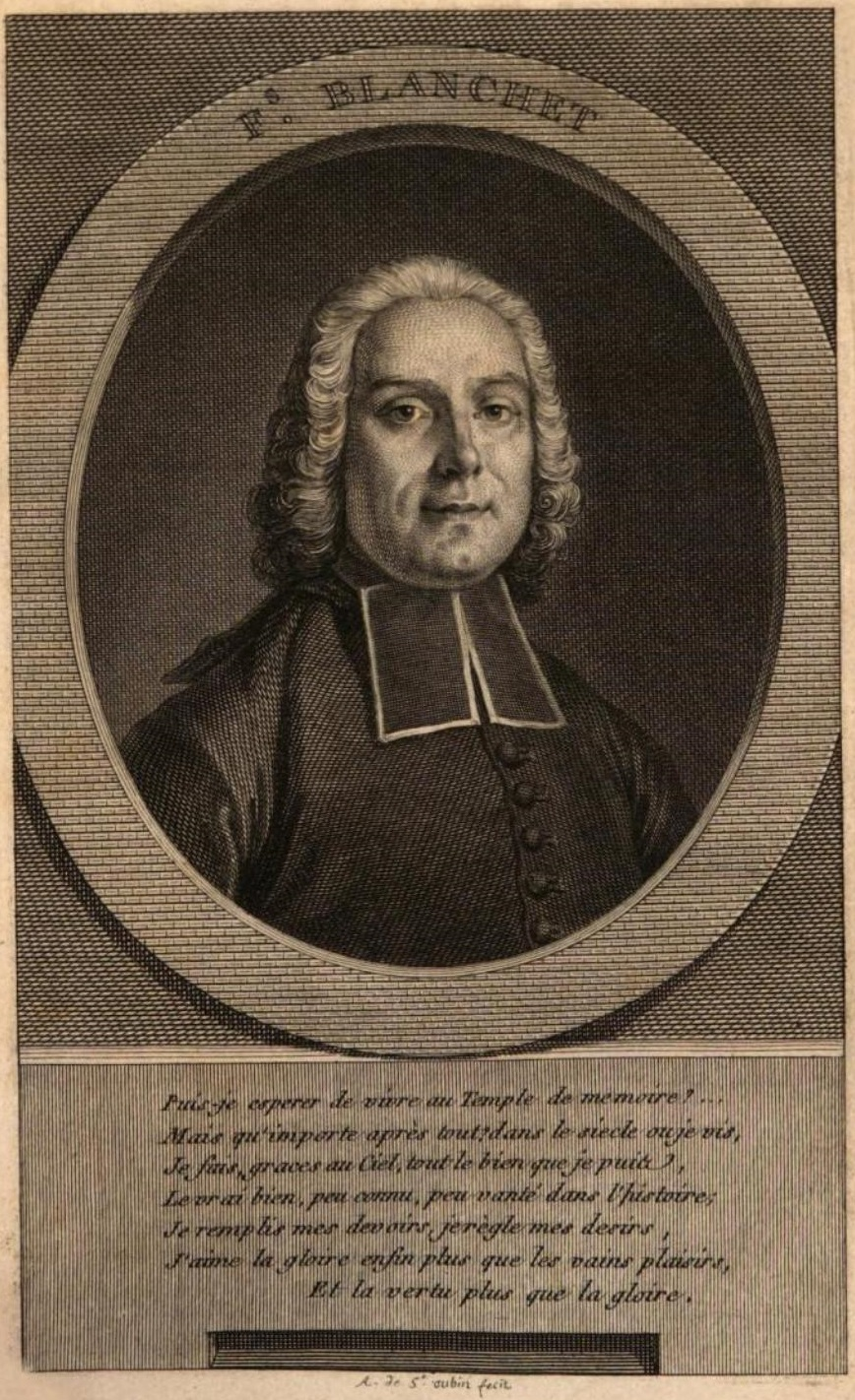
Blanchet, François (abbé)

Abbé François Blanchet (26 January 1707 – 29 January 1784) was a French littérateur, or Intellectual. He spent his younger years in a Jesuit (Society of Jesus) order. Blanchet was the author of Apologues and Tales, a highly esteemed work.

== Works ==
- Apologues et Contes Orientaux (1784, Paris) (in English, Apologues and Tales)
