= Henry Cunningam =

Henry Cunningam (7 July 1707 – 9 July 1777) was an Irish Anglican priest in the 18th century.

Cunningham was born in Limerick and educated at Trinity College, Dublin. He held livings at Killuken, Tumna and Creeve. was appointed Archdeacon of Elphin in 1751. He resigned in 1761 for the Prebendal Stall of Ballintubber in Elphin Cathedral.
