= Pierre Adamoli =

18th-century French collector

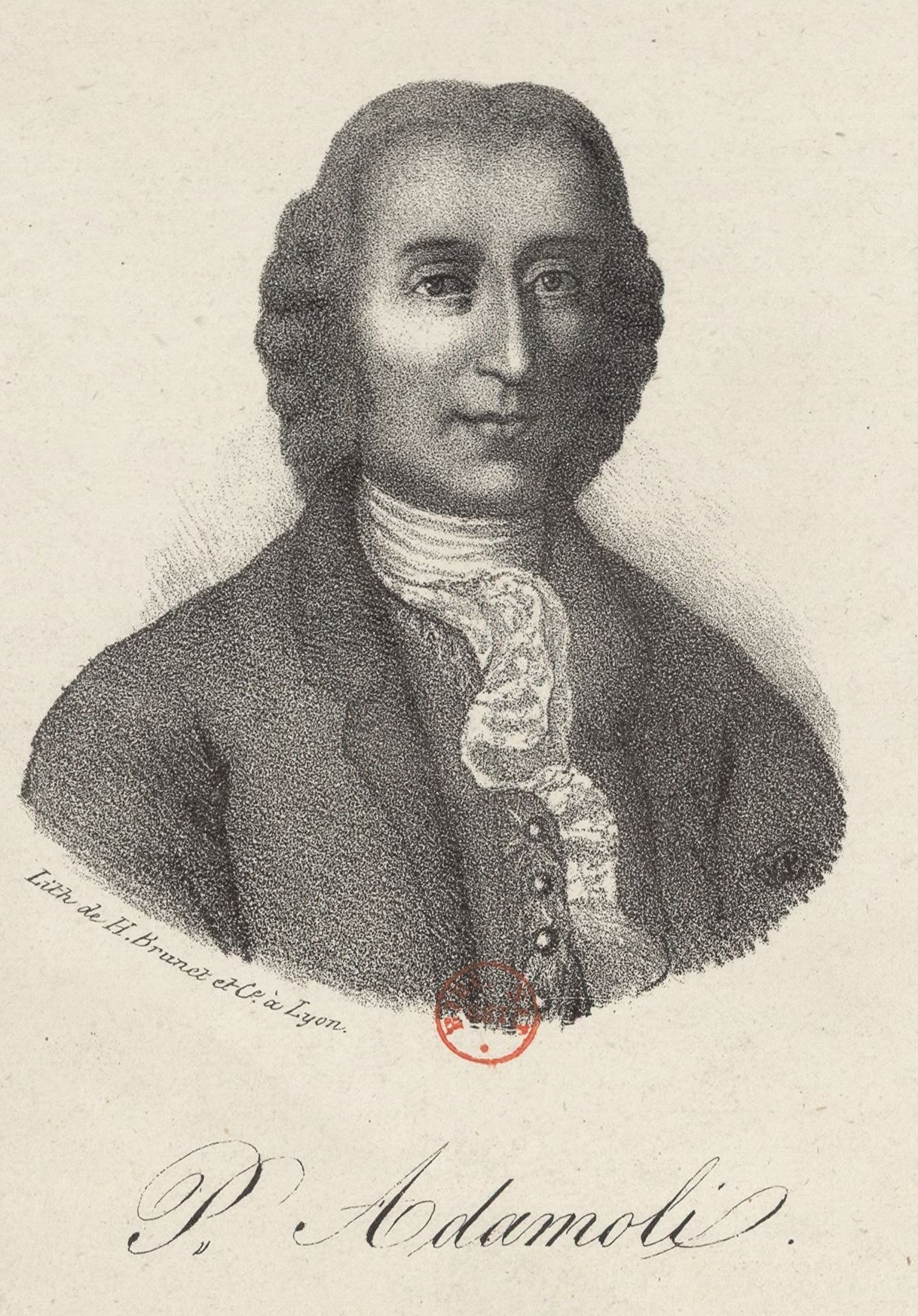
- Portrait of Pierre Adamoli
- Born: 5 August 1707; Lyon
- Died: 3 June 1769 (aged 61); Lyon
- Occupation: Collector

Pierre Adamoli (5 August 1707 – 3 June 1769) was an 18th-century French collector. He is remembered as a great bibliophile of the Age of Enlightenment.

== Collection ==
Printed books and manuscripts were not his only interests. Also known are his collection of coins and natural wonders as it was common to meet at the time, in cabinets of curiosities.

== Legacy ==
When he died, he bequeathed a rich library of over 5,600 volumes. Three quarters of this collection are today stored at the municipal library of Lyon. Other copies are to be found at the Académie des sciences, belles-lettres et arts de Lyon|Académie de Lyon, the Bibliothèque nationale de France and the British Library.

== Bibliography ==
- Yann Sordet, L'amour des livres au siècle des Lumières, Pierre Adamoli et ses collections, École des Chartes, Paris, 2001
