= 1700s =

1700s may refer to:

- The century from 1700 to 1799, almost synonymous with the 18th century (1701–1800)
- 1700s (decade), the period from 1700 to 1709
