= 1740s =

Decade

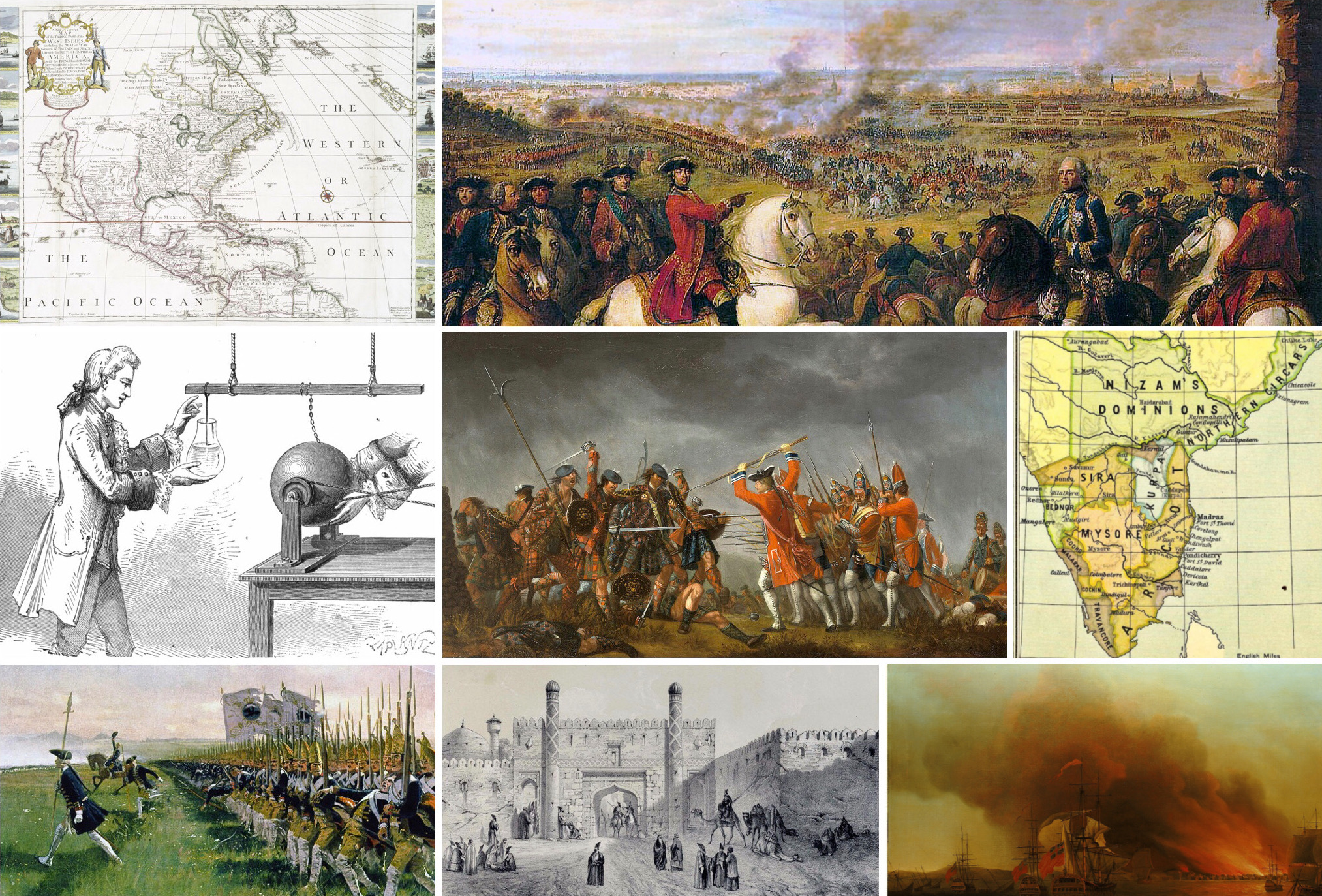
From top left, clockwise: The War of Jenkins' Ear, a conflict between the British and Spanish Empires lasting from 1739 to 1748. The War of the Austrian Succession from 1740 to 1748, caused by the death of Charles VI, Holy Roman Emperor in 1740. The siege of Trichinopoly, a conflict between the Nizam of Hyderabad and the Maratha Empire over the Carnatic region. George Anson burns Paita, a settlement in Peru in 1742 whilst on a voyage around the world. Nader Shah declares war on the Ottoman Empire in 1743 resulting in the Ottoman–Persian War. Following the end of the First Silesian War in 1742, the Second Silesian War occurs as a continuation of the first war. A Leyden jar is discovered independently by Ewald Georg von Kleist and Pieter van Musschenbroek. The Jacobite rising of 1745, an attempt by Charles Edward Stuart to regain the British throne for his father.

The 1740s (pronounced "seventeen-forties") decade ran from January 1, 1740, to December 31, 1749. Many events during this decade sparked an impetus for the Age of Reason. Military and technological advances brought one of the first instances of a truly global war to take place here, when Maria Theresa of Austria’s struggle to succeed the various crowns of her father King Charles VI led to a war involving nearly all European states in the War of the Austrian Succession, eventually spilling over to North America with the War of Jenkins’ Ear (which went on to involve many of the West’s first ferocious maritime battles). Capitalism grew robust following the fallout of the South Sea bubble two decades prior and the subsequent reign of Sir Robert Walpole, whose rule ended in the earlier half of this decade.

== Events ==
=== 1740 ===
==== January–March ====
- January 8 – All 237 crewmen on the Dutch East India Company ship Rooswijk are drowned when the vessel strikes the shoals of Goodwin Sands, off of the coast of England, as it is beginning its second voyage to the Indies. The wreckage is discovered more than 250 years later, in 2004.
- February 20 – The North Carolina General Assembly incorporates the town of Newton as Wilmington, North Carolina, named for Spencer Compton, 1st Earl of Wilmington and patron of Royal Governor Gabriel Johnston.
- March 16 – King Edward of the Miskito Indians signs a treaty making his kingdom, located on the coast of modern-day Nicaragua, a protectorate of Great Britain.
- March 25 – Construction begins on Bethesda Orphanage for boys near Savannah, Georgia, founded by George Whitefield.

==== April–June ====
- April 8 – War of the Austrian Succession: The Royal Navy captures the Spanish ship of the line Princesa off Cape Finisterre and takes her into British service.
- May 31 – Frederick II becomes King in Prussia upon the death of his father, Frederick William I.
- June 1 – Plantation Act 1740 or Naturalization Act 1740 of the Parliament of Great Britain comes into effect providing for Protestant alien immigrants (including Huguenots, and also Jews) residing in the American colonies for 7 years to receive British nationality.
- June 16 – Pour le Mérite first awarded in Prussia as a military honour.
- June 26 – War of Jenkins' Ear: Siege of Fort Mose – A Spanish column of 300 regular troops, free Black militia and Indian auxiliaries storms Britain's strategically crucial position of Fort Mose, Florida.

==== July–September ====
- July 7 – Adam Smith sets out from Scotland to take up a scholarship at Balliol College, Oxford.
- July 11 – Pogrom: Jews are expelled from Little Russia.
- August 1 – The song Rule, Britannia! is first performed at Cliveden, the country home of Frederick, Prince of Wales, in England.
- August 17 – Pope Benedict XIV succeeds Pope Clement XII, as the 247th pope.
- September 8 – Hertford College, Oxford, England, is founded for the first time.

==== October–December ====
- October 9–22 – Batavia Massacre: Troops of the Dutch East India Company massacre at least 10,000 Chinese Indonesians in Batavia.
- October 20 – Maria Theresa inherits the hereditary dominions of the Habsburg monarchy (Austria, Bohemia, Hungary and modern-day Belgium) under the terms of the Pragmatic Sanction of 1713 on the death of her father, Charles VI. Her succession to the Holy Roman Empire is contested widely because she is a woman, but she will reign for 40 years.
- November 6 – Samuel Richardson's popular and influential epistolary novel, Pamela; or, Virtue Rewarded, is published anonymously in London.
- November 14 – The University of Pennsylvania is officially established.
- December 16 – Frederick II of Prussia invades the Habsburg possession of Silesia, starting the War of the Austrian Succession.

==== Date unknown ====
- Enfield, North Carolina, is founded.
- Spain begins construction on Fort Matanzas in the Matanzas Inlet, approximately 15 miles (24 km) south of St. Augustine, Florida.

=== 1741 ===
==== January–March ====
- January 13
  - Lanesborough, Massachusetts is created as a township.
  - Conventicle Act of 1741 is introduced in Denmark-Norway.
- February 13 – Sir Robert Walpole, the prime minister of Great Britain, popularizes the term "the balance of power" in a speech in Parliament.
- February 14 – Irish-born actor Charles Macklin makes his London stage debut as Shylock in The Merchant of Venice at the Theatre Royal, Drury Lane, pioneering a psychologically realistic style with Shakespeare's text revived, replacing George Granville's melodramatic adaptation The Jew of Venice. Kitty Clive plays the travesti role of Portia.
- March 9 – War of the Austrian Succession: Prussian troops bring down the Austrian fortress of Glogau (modern-day Głogów in Poland).
- March 13 – The British Royal Navy takes 180 warships, frigates and transport vessels, led by Admiral Edward Vernon, to threaten Cartagena, Colombia, with more than 27,000 crew against the 3,600 defenders.

==== April–June ====
- April 6 – The New York Slave Insurrection, a plot to set fire to New York City, is discovered.
- April 10 – War of the Austrian Succession: An Austrian army is defeated by Prussian troops of Frederick the Great in the Battle of Mollwitz.
- May 4 – Vitus Bering sets out from Petropavlovsk-Kamchatsky to map the coasts of Siberia and Alaska.
- May 9 – War of Jenkins' Ear: Battle of Cartagena de Indias – Spain's defenders in New Grenada, under the command of General Blas de Lezo, defeat Edward Vernon's Royal Navy force, leading to a British retreat to Jamaica.
- May 14 – HMS Wager, one of the vessels of George Anson's voyage around the world, is wrecked on the coast of Chile, killing most of the crew who have survived scurvy.
- May 15 – Nader Shah, Emperor of Persia, narrowly escapes an assassination attempt.
- May 21 – War of the Austrian Succession: King George II of Great Britain orders the British Army to prepare for an invasion of Prussia to defend his Electorate of Hanover.
- June 11 – 1741 British general election, begun on April 30, concludes with Prime Minister Robert Walpole's Whigs retaining their majority in the House of Commons but losing 44 seats to candidates who have defected to the new Patriot Whigs to oppose his policies.
- June 25 – Maria Theresa of Austria is crowned Queen Regnant of Hungary in Bratislava.

==== July–September ====
- July 8 – Jonathan Edwards repeats his Sinners in the Hands of an Angry God sermon at Enfield, Connecticut.
- July 15 – Alexei Chirikov sights land in Southeast Alaska, and sends some men aboard his ship ashore in a longboat, making them the first Europeans to visit Alaska.
- August 4–5 – War of Jenkins' Ear: Invasion of Cuba – British Admiral Edward Vernon captures Guantánamo Bay in Cuba, which he renames Cumberland Bay, but which his forces are forced to abandon on December 9.
- August 10 – Raja Marthanda Varma of Travancore defeats the Dutch East India Company in the Battle of Colachel, ending the Dutch colonial rule in India and marking the first "major" defeat of a European colonial military power in India.
- August 23 – At least 2,000 die along the shores of the Sea of Japan after a volcanic eruption on an island generated the Kampo Tsunami.
- September 11 – War of the Austrian Succession: Linz falls to the Bavarian Army.

==== October–December ====
- October 12 – George II, as Elector of Hanover, signs the Neustadt Protocol with France, but fails to inform his British government until after his return from Germany.
- November 25–26 – War of the Austrian Succession: Franco-Bavarian troops commanded by Maurice of Saxony storm in Battle of Prague city Prague.
- December 6 (November 25, O.S.) – Elizabeth of Russia becomes czarina after a palace coup.
- December 7
  - War of the Austrian Succession: Charles Albert of Bavaria has himself proclaimed King of Bohemia.
  - Aleksei Chirikov of Russia presents the first written description of the northwest coast of North America.
- December 19 – Vitus Bering dies during his expedition, east of Siberia.
- December 25 – Anders Celsius develops his own thermometer scale, Centigrade, the predecessor of the Celsius scale.

==== Date unknown ====
- Summer – Upper Priory Cotton Mill is opened in Birmingham, England, as the world's first mechanised cotton mill by Lewis Paul and John Wyatt; although this is not a commercial success, other Paul-Wyatt cotton mills follow.
- Stemmatographia by Hristofor Zhefarovich, regarded as the first Serbian and Bulgarian secular printed book, is printed in Vienna.
- The Royal Order of Scotland in freemasonry is founded.

=== 1742 ===
==== January–March ====
- January 9 – Robert Walpole is made Earl of Orford, and resigns as First Lord of the Treasury and Chancellor of the Exchequer, effectively ending his period as Prime Minister of Great Britain. On his formally relinquishing office five days later, he will have served 20 years and 314 days as Prime Minister, the longest single term ever, and also longer than the accumulated terms of any other British Prime Minister.
- January 14 – Edmond Halley dies; James Bradley succeeds him as Astronomer Royal of Great Britain.
- January 24 – Charles VII becomes Holy Roman Emperor.
- January 28? – The House of Commons of Great Britain votes on the alleged rigging of the Chippenham by-election. It becomes a motion of no confidence, which leads to the resignation of Robert Walpole.
- February 12 – John Carteret, 2nd Lord Carteret becomes Secretary of State for the Northern Department in Great Britain.
- February 15— First Silesian War, part of War of the Austrian Succession: Troops of the Kingdom of Prussia, Saxony and France, under the command of Prince Dietrich of Anhalt-Dessau, capture the Moravian town of Iglau (now Jihlava). At this point, the Saxons and French declare that their obligations to Prussia have ceased.
- February 16 – Spencer Compton, Earl of Wilmington, becomes Prime Minister of Great Britain.
- February 22 – Henry Fielding publishes his picaresque novel Joseph Andrews anonymously in London when "the first edition... reached the bookstalls" in the city.
- March 15
  - Denmark-Norway concludes a treaty of friendship with France, a day after the expiration of its 1739 treaty with Great Britain.
  - The Verendrye brothers take possession of South Dakota in the name of the King of France.
- March 29 – Acting in his capacity of Grand Duke of Lithuania, Poland's King Stanisław August Poniatowski issues a proclamation allowing Jews in the Lithuanian capital of Vilnius to live anywhere except for two public streets, the Pilies street and the Galves Street.

==== April –June ====
- April 13 – George Frideric Handel's oratorio The Messiah is first performed, in Dublin, Ireland in aid of local charities.
- May 17 – Battle of Chotusitz: Frederick the Great's army defeats the Austrians.
- May 24 – War of the Austrian Succession – Battle of Sahay: French forces defeat the Austrians.
- May – In Peru, Juan Santos takes the name Atahualpa II, and begins an ill-fated rebellion against Spanish rule. Father Domingo Garcia sends the first report of the rebellion to his superiors on June 2.
- June 7 – Christian Goldbach first describes Goldbach's conjecture ("Every even number is the sum of two primes") in a letter to fellow mathematician Leonhard Euler.
- June 11 – Peace of Breslau: Austria cedes Silesia to Prussia.
- June 20 – İzmir, formerly the ancient Greek city of Smyrna, is destroyed by fire.

==== July–September ====
- July 7 – War of Jenkins' Ear: Battle of Bloody Marsh – British troops repel those of Spain (under Montiano), in the Province of Georgia.
- July 14 – William Pulteney is created 1st Earl of Bath in Great Britain.
- August 17
  - Accompanied by 10 French Army observers, Choctaw Indians from the French Louisiana territory cross the Tombigbee River and raid Chickasaw Indian towns in Georgia. Over three days, the attackers lose 50 men, the Chickasaw defenders about 25. For permitting the attack, the French Louisiana governor, the Sieur de Bienville, is summoned back to Paris.
  - Irish author and poet Dean Jonathan Swift is declared by a court to be "of unsound mind and memory" and confined to home treatment for the remaining three years of his life.
- August 19
  - A British fleet led by Commodore William Martin enters the harbor of Naples with three warships, two frigates, and four bomb vessels, and sends a message giving the King Charles VII of Naples (the future King Charles III of Spain) 30 minutes to agree to withdraw Neapolitan troops from the Spanish Army. Don Carlos agrees and ends the threat of a Spanish foothold in Italy.
  - Voltaire's controversial play Fanatacism, or Mahomet the Prophet is first performed, in Paris, to a theatre audience filled with French nobility.
- August 20 – The Swedish-Russian War effectively ends as 17,000 Swedish troops surrender in Finland at Helsingfors (Helsinki).
- August 27 – George Anson, captain of HMS Centurion, arrives with his seriously ill crew at the island of Tinian (now U.S. territory as one of the Northern Mariana Islands) and saves his mission.
- September 5 – The 46 survivors of Russia's Great Northern Expedition return to Petropavlovsk after having been shipwrecked on an island in the Bering Strait ten months earlier. They had completed the building of a new ship from the wreckage of the St Pyotr on August 21.
- September 16 – Construction starts on the Foundling Hospital in London.

==== October–December ====
- October 5
  - Pedro Cebrian y Agustin, Count of Fuenclara, arrives at Veracruz to become the new Spanish Viceroy of New Spain.
  - Pennsylvania's Colonial Governor George Thomas bars citizens from settling in Lancaster County, or west of the Blue Mountains.
- November 13 – The Royal Danish Academy of Sciences and Letters is founded.
- December 2 – The Pennsylvania Journal first appears in the United States.

==== Date unknown ====
- The Lopukhina Conspiracy arises at the Russian court.
- The Afghan tribes unite as a monarchy.
- Daniel le Pelley succeeds Nicolas le Pelley, as Seigneur of Sark.
- Molde, Norway, becomes a city.
- Eisenach, Germany builds its Stadtschloss (city castle).
- Spain completes the construction of Fort Matanzas in the Matanzas Inlet, approximately 15 miles (24 km) south of St. Augustine, Florida.
- The University of Erlangen is founded in Bavaria.
- Anders Celsius publishes his proposal for a centigrade temperature scale originated in 1741.
- Colin Maclaurin publishes his Treatise on Fluxions.
- Charles Jervas's English translation of Don Quixote is published posthumously. Through a printer's error, the translator's name is printed as 'Charles Jarvis', leading the book to forever be known as the Jarvis translation. It is acclaimed as the most faithful English rendering of the novel made up to this time.
- The Roman Catholic church decrees that Roman ceremonial practice in Latin (not in Chinese) is to be the law for Chinese missions.

=== 1743 ===
==== January–March ====
- January 1 – The Verendrye brothers, probably Louis-Joseph and François de La Vérendrye, become the first white people to see the Rocky Mountains from the eastern side (the Spanish conquistadors had seen the Rockies from the west side).
- January 8 – King Augustus III of Poland, acting in his capacity as Elector of Saxony, signs an agreement with Austria, pledging help in war in return for part of Silesia to be conveyed to Saxony.
- January 12
  - The Verendryes, and two members of the Mandan Indian tribe, reach the foot of the mountains, near the site of what is now Helena, Montana.
  - An earthquake strikes the Philippines
- January 16 – Cardinal André-Hercule de Fleury turns his effects over to King Louis XV, 13 days before his death on January 29.
- January 23 – With mediation by France, Sweden and Russia begin peace negotiations at Åbo (Turku) to end the Russo-Swedish War. By August 17, Sweden cedes all of its claims to southern Finland.
- February 21 – George Frideric Handel's oratorio, Samson, premieres in London.
- March 2 – A British expeditionary fleet under Sir Charles Knowles is defeated by the Spanish in the Battle of La Guaira.

==== April–June ====
- April 1 – Pope Benedict XIV issues a new bill, barring agreements by spouses not to appeal annulments of marriages
- April 2 – The Verendrye brothers bury a tablet claiming the Great Plains of North America for King Louis XV of France. A schoolgirl in Pierre, South Dakota, unearths the tablet 170 years later on February 16, 1913.
- April 3 – Prithvi Narayan Shah becomes the new King of the Gorkha Kingdom and begins a campaign to unify the 54 different principalities in the Himalayas under his rule as part of the unification of Nepal
- April 9 – The Verendrye brothers make the first contact since 1722 between Europeans and the Sioux Indians, whom they refer to as Les Gens de la Fleche Collee ("the people of the sheathed arrow").
- April 13 – The British East India Company ship Princess Louisa is wrecked off the coast of Maio Island in the Cape Verde Islands, killing 49 of her 179 crew.
- April 18 – The trustees of the English Province of Georgia vote to inaugurate public schools in the corporate territory.
- May 9 – Austrian army defeats the Bavarian army in the Battle of Simbach.
- May 10 – In New France, Jean-Baptiste Le Moyne de Bienville ends his final term (multiple times over 43 years) as Governor of colonial French Louisiana, which he helped colonize; he is succeeded by the Marquis de Vaudreuil (for the next 10 years) and returns to France.
- May 30 – The Dalecarlian rebellion (1743) breaks out in Sweden.
- June 27 (June 16 O.S.) – War of the Austrian Succession – Battle of Dettingen in Bavaria: British forces, in alliance with those of Hanover and Hesse, defeat a French army under the duc de Noailles; King George II of Great Britain (and Elector of Brunswick) leads his own troops, the last British king to do so.

==== July–September ====
- July 3 – As a concession to Russia, Sweden's parliament ratifies the election of Adolphus Frederick of Holstein-Gottorp, a great-grandson of King Charles XI, to be heir to the throne of Sweden. Adolphus becomes king on the death of King Frederick on April 5, 1751, marking the end of the Hesse-Kassel dynasty and the start of the dynasty of the Holstein-Gottorp that will rule Sweden from 1751 to 1818
- July 13 – All 276 people on board the Dutch East India Company ship Hollandia drown after the ship strikes a rock off of the Isles of Scilly in England near Cornwall. The wreckage is located in 1971.
- July 20 – Lord Anson captures the Philippine galleon Nuestra Señora de Covadonga and its treasure of 1,313,843 Spanish dollars at Manila along with a treasure of 2 1/2 million dollars, and proceeds back toward Mexico, then returns to Britain in 1744
- July 23 – James Oglethorpe departs from Georgia to England and returns there in September.
- July 28 – France and the Allies of Britain conclude a treaty to provide care for each other's wounded.
- July 31 – At a summit in Lancaster, Pennsylvania, the British colonies of Virginia, Maryland and Pennsylvania conclude a treaty with the Six Nations, conceding that the member tribes are entitled to the territory west of the Appalachian mountains and north of the Ohio River.
- August 18 (August 7 Old Style) – Russia and Sweden sign the Treaty of Åbo.
- August 24 – The War of the Hats: The Swedish army surrendered to the Russians in Helsinki, ending the war and starting Lesser Wrath.
- August 27 – Henry Pelham becomes Prime Minister of Great Britain.
- September 11 – Russian noble Natalia Lopukhina is flogged in front of the Twelve Collegia building in Saint Petersburg, bringing a conclusion to the "Lopukhina Affair" plotted by France and the Duchy of Holstein.
- September 13 – The Treaty of Worms is signed between Great Britain, Austria and Sardinia.

==== October–December ====
- October 19 – Louis Maria Colons, one of nine French Canadians who had attempted to colonize territory in what is now New Mexico, is executed for attempting to persuade the Pueblo Indians to rise up against the Spanish colonial government.
- October 21 – Benjamin Franklin's view of a lunar eclipse from Philadelphia is spoiled by a rainstorm; several days later, he learns that residents of Boston received the same storm hours after the eclipse, demonstrating that weather moves from west to east.
- October 23 – After almost six weeks, Nader Shah of Persia lifts the siege of Mosul.
- November 5 – Coordinated scientific observations of the transit of Mercury are organized by Joseph-Nicolas Delisle.
- December 3 – Ecuadorian scientist Pedro Vicente Maldonado departs from Brazil in order to purchase the most state-of-the-art equipment for the French Geodesic Mission
- December 9 – At Haarlem, Dutch astronomer Dirk Klinkenberg becomes the first to observe the Great Comet of 1744. Swiss astronomer Jean-Philippe de Cheseaux discovers it independently on December 13. Both scientists are given credit for its discovery
- December 10 – King Louis XV of France informs King Philip V of Spain of his intent to try to restore the House of Stuart to the throne of the United Kingdom. James Francis Edward Stuart was briefly the Crown Prince of England and Scotland until his father, King James II, was deposed in 1688 and, as Pretender to the Throne, would become King James III if the attack, planned for January 1, 1744 succeeds.
- December 11 – Princess Louise of Great Britain, daughter of King George II, weds Frederick, Crown Prince of Denmark and Norway.

==== Undated ====
- Capodimonte porcelain is first manufactured, in Naples.
- Probable date – The last wolf in Scotland is shot, in Killiecrankie.

=== 1744 ===
==== January–March ====
- January 6 – The Royal Navy ship Bacchus engages the Spanish Navy privateer Begona, and sinks it; 90 of the 120 Spanish sailors die, but 30 of the crew are rescued.
- January 24 – The Dagohoy rebellion in the Philippines begins, with the killing of Father Giuseppe Lamberti.
- February 22–23 – Battle of Toulon: The British fleet is defeated by a joint Franco-Spanish fleet.
- February 27 – Violent storms frustrate a planned French invasion of Britain.
- March 1 (approximately) – The Great Comet of 1744, one of the brightest ever seen, reaches perihelion.
- March 13 – The British ship Betty capsizes and sinks off of the Gold Coast (modern-day Ghana) near Anomabu. More than 200 people on board die, although there are a few survivors.
- March 15 – France declares war on Great Britain.

==== April–June ====
- April – The Female Spectator (a monthly) is founded by Eliza Haywood in England, the first periodical written for women by a woman.
- April 2 – The first Rules of golf are drawn up at Leith, for the first golf competition.
- April 27 – Siege of Villafranca (1744): A joint French and Spanish force defeats Britain and Sardinia.
- May 11 – Russia's treasury begins an effort to reduce the number of copper five-kopeck pieces (20 of which equal a Russian ruble) by declaring that it will buy them back at a ruble for every 20 until August 1, after which kopecks would be redeemed at a ruble for every 25; then at the rate of 33 for a ruble on October 1, and 50 for a ruble on and after August 28, 1746.
- May 22 – The Union of Germany is proclaimed in Frankfurt Frederick II of Prussia, as articles of union are signed between Prussia, Hesse-Kassel and the Rhineland Palatinate.
- May 24 – After receiving the news from Europe that Great Britain and France are at war, the French Army at Louisbourg attacks the British settlement at Fort William Augustus at Canso, Nova Scotia and forces its surrender.
- June 13 – Alexey Bestuzhev-Ryumin is named as the new Chancellor of the Russian Empire by the Empress Elizabeth.
- June 15 – Commodore George Anson's voyage around the world concludes after four years as HMS Centurion returns to England at Spithead and Anson is greeted as a hero.
- June 28 – At the age of 15, Princess Sophie of Anhalt-Zerbst, the future Empress of Russia, is received into the Russian Orthodox Church after converting from the Lutheran faith. Upon her conversion to the Russian Orthodox religion, she is given the name Yekaterina (Catherine). In 1762, she takes the throne as the Empress Catherine II, later known as Catherine the Great.

==== July–September ====
- July 8 – The Royal Navy privateer Somerset capsizes and sinks in the Bristol Channel, killing 86 of the 97 crew.
- July 19 – Battle of Casteldelfino: France defeats the Kingdom of Sardinia.
- July 29 – Nader Shah lays siege to the Ottoman citadel of Kars.
- August 12 – Battle of Velletri in the Kingdom of Naples: Spanish-Neapolitan forces defeat those of the Archduchy of Austria.
- September 30 – Battle of Madonna dell'Olmo: France and Spain defeat the Kingdom of Sardinia.

==== October–December ====
- October 4 – In one of the greatest disasters for the Royal Navy, HMS Victory sinks in a storm in the English Channel, killing 1,100 sailors and officers it had been bringing back from Gibraltar to England, including Admiral John Balchen. The wreck will be located 264 years later, in January, 2009.
- October 12 – The creator of binomial nomenclature for the identification of plant and animal species, Carl Linnaeus, is selected as president of the Royal Swedish Academy of Science, succeeding the late Anders Celsius, who had devised the centigrade measurement of temperature.
- October 19 – William Shirley, the British colonial Governor of the Province of Massachusetts Bay, announces the declaration of war against the Miꞌkmaq and Maliseet Indian tribes.
- October 25
  - The Massachusetts General Court, colonial legislature for the Massachusetts Bay Province, approves an incentive for the killing of enemy Indians, authorizing the payment of 100 Massachusetts pounds for the scalping of a Mi'kmaq or Maliseet Indian, and 50 for the scalps of women or children.
  - Spanish explorers Antonio de Ulloa and Jorge Juan y Santacilla complete their mission of exploration and depart from the Peruvian seaport of Callao for a return to Spain.
- November 1 – Second Silesian War: The Prussian Army, under the command of Field Marshal Kurt Christoph Graf von Schwerin, begins the bombardment of Prague. The Bohemian capital surrenders after two weeks.
- December 18 – Queen Maria Theresa of Austria issues a proclamation to rid Bohemia of its Jewish residents, with the Jews to leave Prague over the next two weeks, and then to depart from Bohemia entirely in 1745.

==== Date unknown ====
- The third French and Indian War, known as King George's War, breaks out at Annapolis Royal, Nova Scotia.
- Tommy Thumb's Pretty Song Book, sequel to Tommy Thumb's Song Book, containing the oldest version of many well-known and popular rhymes, is published in London.

=== 1745 ===
==== January–March ====
- January 7 – War of the Austrian Succession: The Austrian Army, under the command of Field Marshal Károly József Batthyány, makes a surprise attack at Amberg and the winter quarters of the Bavarian Army, and scatters the Bavarian defending troops, then captures the Bavarian capital of Munich.
- January 8 – The Quadruple Alliance treaty is signed at Warsaw by Great Britain, Austria, the Dutch Republic and the Duchy of Saxony.
- January 20 – Less than two weeks after the disastrous Battle of Amberg leaves Bavaria undefended, the electorate's ruler (and Holy Roman Emperor) Charles VII dies from gout at the age of 47, leaving the duchy without an adult to lead it. His 17-year-old son, Maximilian III Joseph, signs terms of surrender in April.
- February 22 – The ruling white colonial government on the island of Jamaica foils a conspiracy by about 900 black slaves, who had been plotting to seize control and to massacre the white residents.
- February 23 – The royal wedding of the crown prince of France takes place at Versailles: the Dauphin Louis Ferdiand, eldest son of King Louis XV, is united in marriage to Princess Maria Teresa Rafaela of Spain, daughter of King Philip V. The Dauphin never takes the throne, dying in 1765, eight years before the death of his father.
- February 27 – Pierre Bouguer appears before the French Academy of Sciences to deliver his report of the data gathered in the French Geodesic Mission, including the first precise measurement of the Earth's circumference. His determination that the circumference is 24,854.85 miles (40,000.00 km) and that the distance from the pole to equator is roughly 6,214 miles (10,000 km) eventually leads to the Academy's calculation of the metre and the metric system.
- March 1 – Augustus III, the King of Poland and Elector of Saxony, declares his candidacy to become the next Holy Roman Emperor, but loses in September to Francis, Duke of Tuscany.

==== April–June ====
- April 4 (March 24, old style) – Under the command of British Army General William Pepperrell, the first 4,300 American colonists in the New England Army depart Boston to liberate the French North American colony of Nova Scotia. The flotilla of 80 military transports and 18 armed escorts is scattered by a storm, but the first troops disembark at Canso, Nova Scotia, on April 15 and begin training while waiting for the arrival of the Royal Navy squadron commanded by Admiral Peter Warren.
- April 15 – War of the Austrian Succession: Battle of Pfaffenhofen – The Austrian Army drives the French Army out of Bavaria, forcing the Electorate of Bavaria to withdraw from the war.
- April 22 – Having recently turned 18, Bavaria's ruler Maximilian III Joseph agrees to sign the Treaty of Füssen with Austria, withdrawing Bavaria from further participation in the War of the Austrian Succession, and agreeing to support Austria's candidate for the next Holy Roman Emperor.
- April 29 – The French Navy frigate Renommée approaches the French colony of Nova Scotia, after having been dispatched to warn French forces at Louisbourg of the impending attack by British American forces. However, the Massachusetts privateer HMS Shirley Galley, commanded by John Rous, attacks the Renommée and forces it to sail away. The command at Louisbourg is thus not warned of the impending attack.
- May 11 – War of the Austrian Succession: Battle of Fontenoy – French forces defeat an Anglo-Dutch-Hanoverian army, including the British 42nd Regiment of Foot, also known as Black Watch.
- June 4 – Second Silesian War: Battle of Hohenfriedberg – In the battle that earns him the descriptor of "Frederick the Great", King Frederick II of Prussia decisively defeats the armies of Austria and Saxony.
- June 16 – King George's War: The British capture Cape Breton Island in North America from the French.

==== July–September ====
- July 9 – War of the Austrian Succession – Battle of Melle: The French are victorious in an engagement against the Pragmatic Allies.
- July 15 – Fall of Ghent: The French army occupies Ghent.
- August 6 (July 26 Old Style) – The first recorded women's cricket match takes place in Surrey, England.
- August 19 – The Jacobite rising of 1745 begins at Glenfinnan in Scotland, where Charles Edward Stuart ("Bonnie Prince Charlie") raises his standard in a campaign to enforce his father James Francis Edward Stuart (the "Old Pretender")'s claim to be King James III of England.
- September 1 – Catherine the Great marries Peter III of Russia, in Saint Petersburg.
- September 11 – Jacobite rising of 1745: Jacobites enter Edinburgh; six days later, Charles Edward Stuart proclaims his father as James VIII of Scotland.
- September 12 – Francis I, the Grand Duke of Tuscany, is elected Holy Roman Emperor by the nine prince-electors of the Empire (from Bavaria, Bohemia, Brandenburg, Cologne, Hanover, Mainz, the Palatinate, Saxony and Trier) with the support of his wife, Maria Theresa. He is the successor of Charles VII Albert of Bavaria, an enemy of the House of Habsburg, who died on January 20 of this year.
- September 14 – Madame de Pompadour is officially presented at the court of Louis XV.
- September 16 – Jacobite rising of 1745: "Canter of Coltbrigg" – The British 13th and 14th Dragoons flee the Jacobites near Edinburgh.
- September 21 – Battle of Prestonpans: British Government forces are defeated by the Jacobites in Scotland.
- September 30 – Battle of Soor (Second Silesian War): Frederick the Great's Prussian army is victorious over the forces of Austria and Saxony.

==== October –December ====
- October 4 – Francis is crowned as the new Holy Roman Emperor.
- October 8 – The Empress Elizabeth of Russia agrees to provide the Electorate of Saxony with aid in its war against Prussia, but the agreement comes too late.
- October 11 – At Köslin (modern Koszalin in Poland) Prussian scientist Ewald Georg von Kleist independently invents the first electrical capacitor to store and discharge electricity. The invention, commonly called the Leyden jar is later credited to a subsequent inventor Pieter van Musschenbroek.
- October 14 – In Amritsar in India's Punjab region, the Sikh parliament (the Sarbat Khalsa) votes for a major reorganization of the Sikh nation's army, the Dal Khalsa, with 25 cavalry regiments and support troops under the command of General Nawab Kapur Singh.
- November 1 – Pope Benedict XIV issues the encyclical Vix pervenit, referred to in English as "On Usury and Other Dishonest Profit", to the bishops of Italy, condemning the charging of interest on loans as a sin against the Roman Catholic Church.
- November 8 – Jacobite rising of 1745: Charles Edward Stuart crosses from Scotland into England for the first time. He arrives at Longtown, Cumbria, and spends the night at a nearby village, the Riddings, then leads his army south along the right bank of the River Eden the next day.
- November 23 – Battle of Hennersdorf (Second Silesian War): The Prussian army defeats that of Saxony.
- November 28 – King George's War: A combined force of troops from the French Army and of the Wabanaki Confederacy (Mi'kmaq, Maliseet, Passamaquoddy, Abenaki and Penobscot tribes) destroys the British American settlement at Fort Saratoga (modern Schuylerville, New York), burning the fort and surrounding buildings to the ground, and killing 15 people. Another 103 survivors are taken prisoner.
- December 4 – Jacobite rising of 1745: The Scottish Jacobite army reaches as far south as Derby in England, causing panic in London; two days later it begins to retreat.
- December 17 – Two days after Prussian troops rout the Saxons at the Battle of Kesselsdorf, the Saxon capital of Dresden falls to Prussia's King Frederick the Great.
- December 18 – Jacobite rising of 1745: Clifton Moor Skirmish – The Jacobites are victorious in the last action between two military forces on English soil.
- December 23 – Jacobite rising of 1745: Battle of Inverurie – The Jacobites are victorious over British royal troops.
- December 25 – The Treaty of Dresden gives Prussia full possession of Silesia.
- December 28 – For 5 days, fire destroys buildings in Istanbul.

=== 1746 ===
==== January–March ====
- January 8 – The Young Pretender Charles Edward Stuart occupies Stirling, Scotland.
- January 17 – Battle of Falkirk Muir: British Government forces are defeated by Jacobite forces.
- February 1 – Jagat Singh II, the ruler of the Mewar Kingdom, inaugurates his Lake Palace on the island of Jag Niwas in Lake Pichola, in what is now the state of Rajasthan in northwest India.
- February 19 – Prince William, Duke of Cumberland, issues a proclamation offering an amnesty to participants in the Jacobite rebellion, directing them that they can avoid punishment if they turn their weapons in to their local Presbyterian church.
- February 22 – Brussels, at the time part of the Austrian Netherlands, surrenders to France's Marshal Maurice de Saxe.
- March 10 – Zakariya Khan Bahadur, the Mughal Empire's viceroy administering Lahore (in what is now Pakistan), orders the massacre of the city's Sikh people.

==== April–June ====
- April 16 – The Battle of Culloden in Scotland, the final pitched battle fought on British soil, brings an end to the Jacobite rising of 1745.
- May 27 – The three Scottish leaders of the Jacobite uprising— the Earl of Kilmarnock, Lord Balmerino, and Lord Lovat— are imprisoned for treason in the Tower of London, where they are held by the British government until their execution. Boyd and Balmerino are beheaded in August, while Fraser is not put to death until April 1747.
- June 16 – Battle of Piacenza: Austrian forces defeat French and Spanish troops.
- June 18 – Samuel Johnson is contracted to write his A Dictionary of the English Language.
- June 29 – Catherine of Ricci (b. 1522) is canonized.

==== July–September ====
- July 3 – Father Joachim Royo, the last of the five Spanish Catholic missionaries to Fuzhou in China, is captured by Chinese authorities, after having spent three decades defying orders to not evangelize. He and three fellow priests are put to death two years later, on October 28, 1748.
- July 9 – King Philip V of Spain dies, after a reign of more than 45 years. His oldest living son succeeds him, as Ferdinand VI.
- August 1 – The wearing of the kilt is banned in Scotland by the Dress Act, which comes into force one year later, on August 1, 1747.
- August 18 – Two of the four rebellious Scottish lords, Earl of Kilmarnock and Lord Balmerinoch, are beheaded in the Tower of London (Lord Lovat is executed in 1747).
- September 20 – Bonnie Prince Charlie flees to the Isle of Skye from Arisaig, after the unsuccessful Jacobite rising of 1745, marked by the Prince's Cairn on the banks of Loch nan Uamh.

==== October–December ====
- October 11 – War of the Austrian Succession – Battle of Rocoux: The French army defeats the allied Austrian, British, Hanoveran and Dutch army in Rocourt.
- October 22 – The College of New Jersey is founded in Princetown, New Jersey. In 1896, it is renamed Princeton University.
- October 28 – An earthquake demolishes Lima and Callao, in Peru.
- November 4 – Anwaruddin Khan, the Nawab of the Arcot State in South India, is driven back by the Captain Louis Paradis of the French Army after he and 10,000 soldiers attempt to drive the French back out of Madras.
- December 5 – Rallied by a teenage boy, Giovanni Battista Perasso (nicknamed Balilla"), the citizens of the Republic of Genoa rise up against the Austrian occupying troops and the collaborator Military Governor, the Genoese Marquis of Botta d'Adorno. By December 11, the Austrian soldiers are driven from the Italian city-state, but return a few months later.

==== Date unknown ====
- Eva Ekeblad reports her discovery, of how to make flour and alcohol from potatoes, to the Royal Swedish Academy of Sciences.
- The town of Vilkovo (Odes'ka oblast', Ukraine) is founded.
- Gabriel Johnston, British Governor of the Province of North Carolina, moves to New Bern, the province's largest. New Bern replaces Edenton as the capital of North Carolina until Raleigh is established in 1792.
- Charles Batteux's Les beaux-arts réduits à un même principe is published in Paris, putting forward for the first time the idea of "les beaux arts": "the fine arts".

=== 1747 ===
==== January–March ====
- January 31 – The first venereal diseases clinic opens at London Lock Hospital.
- February 11 – King George's War: A combined French and Indian force, commanded by Captain Nicolas Antoine II Coulon de Villiers, attacks and defeats British troops at Grand-Pré, Nova Scotia.
- March 7 – Juan de Arechederra the Spanish Governor-General of the Philippines, combines his forces with those of Sultan Azim ud-Din I of Sulu to suppress the rebellion of the Moros in the Visayas.
- March 19 – Simon Fraser, the 79-year old Scottish Lord Lovat, is convicted of high treason for being one of the leaders of the Jacobite rising of 1745 against King George II of Great Britain and attempting to place the pretender Charles Edward Stuart on the throne. After a seven day trial of impeachment in the House of Lords and the verdict of guilt, Fraser is sentenced on the same day to be hanged, drawn and quartered; King George alters Fraser's punishment to beheading, which is carried out publicly on April 9.

==== April–June ====
- April 9 – The Scottish Jacobite Lord Lovat is beheaded at Tower Hill, London, for high treason. He was the last person in Britain to be beheaded, although beheading would not be formally abolished until more than 200 years later.
- May 14 – War of the Austrian Succession – First battle of Cape Finisterre: The British Navy defeats a French fleet.
- June 9 – Emperor Momozono ascends to the throne of Japan, succeeding Emperor Sakuramachi.
- June 24–October 14 – The English ships Dobbs galley and California, under Captains William Moore and Francis Smith, explore Hudson Bay, discovering there is no Northwest Passage by this route.

==== July–September ====
- July 2 – War of the Austrian Succession – Battle of Lauffeld: France defeats the combined armies of Hanover, Great Britain and the Netherlands.
- August 15 – Great Britain, Russia and the Dutch Republic sign the Convention of Saint Petersburg (1747).
- August 24 – Seyyid Abdullah Pasha, the Turkish Governor of Cyprus, becomes the new Grand Vizier of the Ottoman Empire and serves until 1750.
- September 13 – The Netherlands city of Bergen op Zoom falls to the Army of France after a 70 day siege during the War of the Austrian Succession.
- September 21 – A hurricane in the Caribbean Sea sinks 11 British ships, most of them off the coast of Saint Kitts.

==== October–December ====
- October 1 – On the 7th day of Shawwal, 1160 A.H., Pashtun chieftains in Kandahar, meeting in a special council (a loya jirga) vote to make Ahmad Shah Durrani their leader in Afghanistan and beginning the Durrani Empire.
- October 21 – King George II transfers Thomas Herring, Archbishop of York, to become the new Archbishop of Canterbury, three days after the death of John Potter
- October 24 – A Caribbean Sea hurricane sweeps across Saint Kitts, sinking 12 British freighters and one from France.
- October 25 – War of the Austrian Succession – Second battle of Cape Finisterre: The British Navy again defeats a French fleet.
- November 9 – Rioters in Amsterdam demand governmental reform.
- November 17–19 – The Knowles Riot breaks out in Boston, Massachusetts, protesting impressment into the British Royal Navy.
- November 22 – End of Second Stadtholderless period: Prince William IV of Orange becomes stadtholder of all the United Provinces.
- December 7 – Benjamin Franklin forms the Pennsylvania Associators, the first militia in the colony of Pennsylvania, which had no standing militia because of its foundation by pacifistic Quakers.
- December 13 – The ordeal of the Maryland freighter sloop Endeavour begins when the ship departs Annapolis for the West Indies and encounters a hurricane. With its masts and rigging torn away, the ship drifts for six months before finally ending up at the island of Tiree off the coast of Scotland
- December 27 – The Parliament of Great Britain amends its Naturalisation Act 1740 to extend recognition to all non-Anglican Protestant denominations in its colonies.

==== Date unknown ====
- James Lind's experiment begins to prove that citrus fruits prevent scurvy.
- War of the Austrian Succession: Spanish troops invade and occupy the coastal towns of Beaufort and Brunswick in the Royal Colony of North Carolina, during what becomes known as the Spanish Alarm. They are later driven out by the local militia.
- Samuel Johnson begins work on A Dictionary of the English Language in London.

=== 1748 ===
==== January–March ====
- January 12 – Ahmad Shah Durrani captures Lahore.
- January 27 – A fire at the prison and barracks at Kinsale, in Ireland, kills 54 of the prisoners of war housed there. An estimated 500 prisoners are safely conducted to another prison.
- February 7 – The San Gabriel mission project begins with the founding of the first Roman Catholic missions further northward in the Viceroyalty of New Spain, in what is now central Texas. On orders of the Viceroy, Juan Francisco de Güemes, Friar Mariano Marti establish the San Francisco Xavier mission at a location on the San Gabriel River in what is now Milam County. The mission, located northeast of the future site of Austin, Texas, is attacked by 60 Apache Indians on May 2, and San Xavier is abandoned after a few years.
- March 11 – In battle near Manupur (15 kilometres (9.3 mi) northwest of Sirhind), Mughal forces under Prince Ahmad Shah Bahadur are victorious against Ahmad Shah Durrani.
- March 25 – A fire in the City of London starts at Change Alley in Cornhill and continues for two days. Dr. Samuel Johnson later writes, "The conflagration of a city, with all its turmoil and concominant distress, is one of the most dreadful spectacles which this world can afford to human eyes". Another history notes more than a century later that "the fire led to a great increase in the practice of fire insurance", after the blaze causes more than £1,000,000 worth of damage.

==== April–June ====
- April 15 – The Siege of the Dutch fortress of Maastricht is started by the French under the command of Maurice de Saxe as part of the War of the Austrian Succession. The fortress falls on May 7 after a little more than three weeks.
- April 24 – A congress assembles at Aix-la-Chapelle (now Aachen), with the intent to conclude the War of the Austrian Succession. The treaty is signed on October 18.
- May 10 – As word arrives that the Dutch Republic has agreed to return control of Maastricht to France, the French Army's leader of the siege, Count Löwendal, marches through the opened city gates with his troops and accepts its surrender.
- June 1
  - A fire in Moscow kills 482 people and destroys 5,000 buildings.
  - José de Escandón is designated by the Viceroy of New Spain as the first Royal Governor of Nuevo Santander. The area covered by the Viceroyalty's new province is now part of the Mexican state of Tamaulipas, and the part of the U.S. state of Texas south of the Guadalupe River (including San Antonio and Corpus Christi).

==== July–September ====
- July 29 – Royal Navy Admiral Edward Boscawen arrives at the coast of southeastern India with 28 ships, to defend Fort St. David from attacks by armies of French India. Historian Francis Grose later writes that Boscawen had brought the largest fleet "ever seen together in the East Indies", with nine ships of the line, two frigates, a sloop, and two tenders" and 14 ships of the British East India Company. Altogether, Boscawen has 3,580 sailors under his command. He then launches an offensive to destroy the French fort at Pondicherry and drive France from the subcontinent.
- August 26 – The first Lutheran Church body in America is founded at a conference in Philadelphia, organized by German-born evangelist Henry Muhlenberg and attended by pastors of orthodox and pious Lutheran communities. The two groups agree to create a common liturgy to govern public worship.
- August – The Camberwell beauty butterfly is named after specimens found at Camberwell in London.
- September 24 – Shah Rukh becomes ruler of Greater Khorasan.

==== October –December ====
- October 12 – War of Jenkins' Ear – Battle of Havana: a British Caribbean squadron engages a Spanish squadron based near Havana.
- October 18 – War of the Austrian Succession: The Treaty of Aix-la-Chapelle is signed to end the war. Great Britain obtains Madras, in India, from France, in exchange for the fortress of Louisbourg in Canada.
- November 22 – The Electorate of Hanover (now occupied by most of the northwestern German state of Niedersachsen or Lower Saxony) issues a decree banishing all adherents of the Moravian Church.
- December 4 – Austria and Spain sign a second treaty to settle the War of the Austrian Succession, and Austria agrees to remove its troops from Modena and Genoa.

==== Date unknown ====
- Leonhard Euler publishes Introductio in analysin infinitorum, an introduction to pure analytical mathematics, in Berlin.
- Montesquieu publishes De l'esprit des lois.
- Friedrich Gottlieb Klopstock publishes the first three cantos of his epic poem Der Messias in hexameters (anonymously), in Bremer Beiträge (Leipzig).
- Adam Smith begins to deliver public lectures in Edinburgh.
- The Royal Swedish Academy of Sciences makes Eva Ekeblad its first female member.
- Construction of the Sveaborg fortification begins near Helsinki.
- The ruins of Pompeii are rediscovered.
- Louis XV breaks his promise to eliminate the income tax, after the Treaty of Aix-la-Chapelle ends the war. The Parlement of Paris protests, so he reduces the tax to 5%.

=== 1749 ===
==== January–March ====
- January 3
  - Benning Wentworth issues the first of the New Hampshire Grants, leading to the establishment of Vermont.
  - The first issue of Berlingske, Denmark's oldest continually operating newspaper, is published.
- January 21 – The Teatro Filarmonico, the main opera theater in Verona, Italy, is destroyed by fire. It is rebuilt in 1754.
- February – The second part of John Cleland's erotic novel Fanny Hill (Memoirs of a Woman of Pleasure) is published in London. The author is released from debtors' prison in March.
- February 28 – Henry Fielding's comic novel The History of Tom Jones, a Foundling is published in London. Also this year, Fielding becomes magistrate at Bow Street, and first enlists the help of the Bow Street Runners, an early police force (eight men at first).
- March 6 – A "corpse riot" breaks out in Glasgow after a body disappears from a churchyard in the Gorbals district. Suspicion falls on anatomy students at the Glasgow Infirmary "had raised a dead body from the grave and carried it to the college" for dissection. The city guard intervenes after a mob of protesters begins breaking windows at random buildings, but groups of citizens begin to make regular patrols of church graveyards
- March 17 – At London's Covent Garden, composer George Frideric Handel conducts the first performance of his new oratorio, Solomon. More than 250 years later, an instrumental from Solomon, "The Arrival of the Queen of Sheba"; will be featured in the 2012 London Summer Olympics opening ceremony.

==== April–June ====
- April 14 – British Royal Navy ship HMS Namur is wrecked in a storm near Fort St. David, India, with the loss of 520 lives.
- April 27 – The first official performance of Handel's Music for the Royal Fireworks in London finishes early, due to the outbreak of fire. The piece had been composed by Handel to commemorate the Peace of Aix-la-Chapelle, which ended the War of the Austrian Succession in 1748.
- May 19 – King George II of Great Britain grants the Ohio Company 200,000 acres (81,000 ha) (312½ square miles or 810 km^{2}) of land north of the Ohio River, encompassing most of the modern U.S. state of Ohio and part of West Virginia. The grant is conditioned on the Company being able to attract 100 European families every year, for seven years, to move to the area occupied by Indian tribes, and to build a fort to protect them
- June 4 – A fire in Glasgow leaves 200 families homeless.
- June 6 – The Conspiracy of the Slaves, which was to have taken place on June 29, is revealed in Malta.

==== July–September ====
- July 9 – The British naval fort at Halifax is founded on mainland Nova Scotia as a defense against the New France Fortress of Louisbourg on Cape Breton Island, less than 100 miles (160 km) away.
- August 2 – Irish-born trader George Croghan, unaware of the recent British grant of land in the Ohio River valley to the Ohio Company, purchases 200,000 acres of much of the same land from the Six Nations of the Iroquois Confederacy, dealing directly with "the three most important Iroquois chiefs resident in that area, in return for an immense quantity of Indian goods." The deal takes place at the Iroquois capital of Onondaga, near present-day Syracuse, New York.
- August 3
  - The Battle of Ambur is fought in south India as the Second Carnatic War begins between the French-supported troops of Chanda Sahib of the Mughal Empire and the British-supported defenders of the Arcot State, led by its 77-year old Nawab, Anwaruddin Khan. After marching outside of the walls of Arcot to confront Chanda Sahib and Joseph Dupleix's 4,000 troops, Anwaruddin Khan's numerically superior force is routed and he is killed in the battle.
  - French explorer Pierre Joseph Céloron de Blainville, commissioned by New France to explore the Ohio Territory claimed by both France and Britain, buries the first of six engraved lead markers claiming the land for King Louis XV. The first plate is buried on the banks of the Allegheny River, near a rock with petroglyphs, in what is now Venango County, Pennsylvania.
- August 7 – Mary Musgrove Bosomworth, a woman of mixed British and Creek Indian ancestry, presents herself as Coosaponakeesa, Queen of the Creek Indians and marches with 200 Creek Indians into the town of Savannah, Georgia. During her confrontation with British colonial authorities, she and her husband Thomas Bosomworth demand payment of "nearly twenty-five thousand dollars" in compensation for property taken from the Creek Indians, before the British authorities determine that she doesn't have the authority to speak for the tribe.
- August 15 – Four Russian sailors— Aleksei Inkov, Khrisanf Inkov, Stepan Sharapov and Fedor Verigin— are rescued after having been marooned on the Arctic Ocean island of Edgeøya for more than six years. They are the only survivors of a crew of 14 whose koch had been blown off course in May 1743 and then broken up by ice. The four are returned home on September 28.
- August 19 – At a ceremony in San Antonio, Texas (then a part of the New Spain province of Nuevo Santander), four Apache chiefs and Spanish colonial officials and missionaries literally "bury the hatchet", placing weapons of war into a pit and covering it as a symbol that the Apaches and the Spaniards will fight no further war against each other.
- September 5 – A delegation of 33 members of the Catawba Indian nation and 73 from the Cherokee nation arrive in Charleston, South Carolina, to discuss a peace treaty with South Carolina's provincial governor, James Glen.
- September 12 – The first recorded game of baseball is played, by Frederick, Prince of Wales, at Kingston upon Thames in England.
- September 23 – Grand Chief Jean-Baptiste Cope, of the Miꞌkmaq Indian nation in Canada, declares war against the British Empire after the building of the fort at Halifax, Nova Scotia and begins hostilities by taking 20 British hostages at Canso.
- September 28 – Three Russian survivors of the shipwreck on Edgeøya return to their homeland after more than six years, as the ship Nikolai i Andrei brings them to the port of Arkhangelsk. A fourth survivor, Fedor Veriginare, died of scurvy during the six-week voyage home.

==== October–December ====
- October 2 – Edward Cornwallis, the British Governor of Nova Scotia, commands his militia and local citizens "to annoy, distress, take or destroy the Savage commonly called Micmac, wherever they are found" and promises a reward of ten guineas (21 British shillings) for every Mi'kmaq scalp brought in.
- October 4 – What is later described as "the least examined yet most influential" of clerical reforms, by the Spanish Bourbon monarchs of the 18th century, begins when King Ferdinand VI approves a royal cédula, removing control of the Roman Catholic parishes of Latin America from religious orders. Henceforward, jurisdiction over parishioners in the archdioceses of Lima, Mexico City and Bogotá is with the secular clergy.
- October 16 – At Falmouth, a part of the British Province of Massachusetts Bay that would later be the site of Portland, Maine, a peace treaty is signed between representatives of Massachusetts Bay and 19 sagamores and tribal chiefs of the Wabanaki Confederacy (encompassing the Penobscot, Kennebec, Odanak and Wôlinak tribes of the Abenaki Indians), temporarily settling territorial disputes in Maine during King George's War.
- October 19 – Two months after Pierre Céloron begins his inspection of the Ohio territory on behalf of France, Christopher Gist starts his survey of the lands along the right bank of the Ohio River on behalf of the British grant to the Ohio Company.
- November 9 – Battle of Penfui on Timor: A large Topass army is defeated by a numerically inferior Dutch East India Company.
- November 12 – In response to the increasing number of starving people moving into Paris from rural parts of France, King Louis XV issues an ordinance that "all the beggars and vagabonds who shall be found either in the streets of Paris, or in churches or church doorways, or in the countryside around Paris, of whatever age or sex, shall be arrested and conducted into prisons, to stay there as long as shall be necessary."
- November 24 – The Province of South Carolina House of Assembly votes to free African-American slave Caesar Norman, and to grant him a lifetime pension of 100 British pounds per year, in return for Caesar's agreement to share the secret of his antidote for poisonous snake venom. Caesar then makes public his herbal cure of juice from Plantago major (the common plantain) and Marrubium vulgare (horehound), combined with "a leaf of good tobacco moistened with rum".
- December 1 – Sultan Azim ud-Din I, recently forced to flee to Manila after being driven from the throne of Sultanate of Sulu elsewhere in the Philippine Islands, announces his intention to convert from Sunni Islam to become baptized as a Christian within the Roman Catholic Church. He changes his name to Fernando after being baptized.
- December 5 – French composer Jean-Philippe Rameau premieres his new opera, Zoroastre, at the Théâtre du Palais-Royal in Paris, but the first version is not a success. After five years of rewriting, Rameau will revive Zoroastre on January 19, 1756 and the opera will continue to be performed more than two centuries later.
- December 7 – Father Junípero Serra begins his missionary work in the New World, 100 days after departing on a voyage from Spain and a day after his arrival at Veracruz in Mexico. During the period from 1769 to 1782, Serra will be the founder of nine missions in the Province of Las Californias, including the sites around which future California cities will be built, including Mission Basilica San Diego de Alcalá in 1769 and Mission San Francisco de Asís in 1776.
- December 30 – Mir Sayyid Muhammad, a grandson of the Shah Suleiman I of Persia, overthrows Shahrokh Shah to become the Shah of Persia, and briefly restores the Safavid dynasty as Suleiman II; his reign ends less than three months later, on March 20, when Kurdish tribesmen restore Shahrokh to the throne.

==== Date unknown ====
- A census is conducted in Finland.
- The land reform of the Great Partition begins in Sweden, and continues until the 19th century.

== Births ==
1740

- February 4 – Carl Michael Bellman, Swedish poet, composer (d. 1795)
- February 15 – Juan Andrés, Spanish Jesuit (d. 1817)
- February 16 – Giambattista Bodoni, Italian publisher and engraver (d. 1813)
- February 17 – John Sullivan, American General in the American Revolutionary War, delegate in the Continental Congress (d. 1795)
- March – Johann van Beethoven, German musician, father of Ludwig van Beethoven (d. 1792)
- March 16 – Johann Jacob Schweppe, German-born inventor, founder of the Schweppes Company (d. 1821)
- April 7 – Haym Salomon, Polish-Jewish American financier of the American Revolution (d. 1785)
- April 14 – Anna Strong, Patriot spy during the American Revolutionary War (d. 1812)
- May 7 – Nikolai Arkharov, Russian police chief (d. 1814)

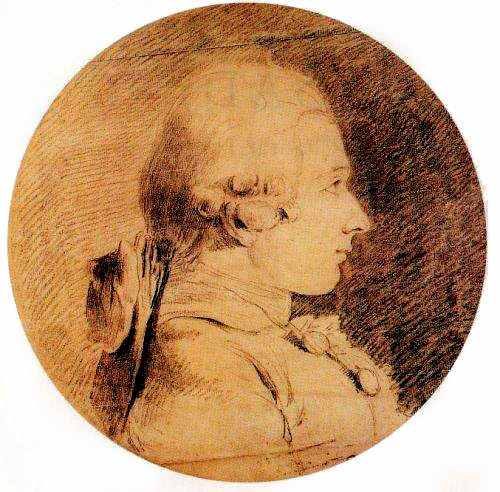
Marquis de Sade

- June 2 – Marquis de Sade, French author, for whom sadism is named (d. 1814)
- June 24 – Juan Ignacio Molina, Spanish-Chilean Jesuit priest, naturalist, historian, translator, geographer, botanist, ornithologist and linguist (d. 1829)
- June 27 – James Woodforde, English clergyman and diarist (d. 1803)
- July 27 – Jeanne Baré, French explorer (d. 1803)
- August 23 – Emperor Ivan VI of Russia (d. 1764)
- August 26 – Joseph-Michel Montgolfier, French inventor (d. 1810)
- September 12 – Johann Heinrich Jung, German writer (d. 1817)
- September 23 – Empress Go-Sakuramachi of Japan (d. 1813)
- September 25 – Hercules Mulligan, tailor and spy during the American Revolutionary War (d. 1825)
- October 29 – James Boswell, Scottish author (d. 1795)
- October 31 – Philip James de Loutherbourg, English artist (d. 1812)
- December – Elisabeth Olin, Swedish opera singer (d. 1828)
- Ali Pasha of Ioannina, Albanian ruler (d. 1822)
- Margaret Bingham, Countess of Lucan, born Margaret Smith, English portrait miniature painter and writer (d. 1814)
- John Milton, American politician and officer of the Continental Army (d. 1817) (earliest estimated date of birth)
- Septimanie d'Egmont, French salonist (d. 1773)

1741

- January 14 – Benedict Arnold, American Revolutionary War general, traitor (d. 1801)
- January 27 – Hester Thrale, Welsh diarist (d. 1821)
- February 7 – Henry Fuseli, Swiss painter and writer (d. 1825)

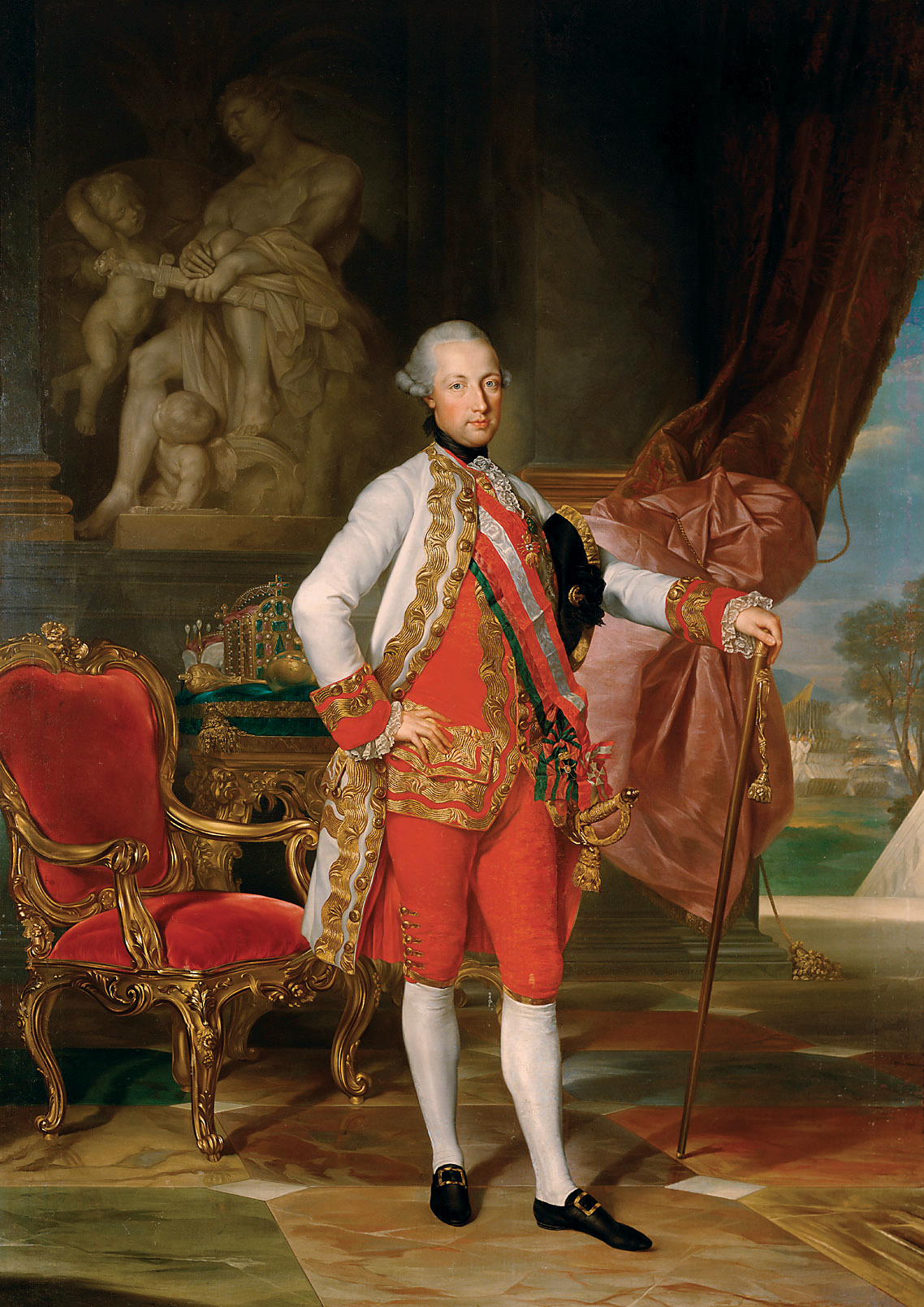
Joseph II, Holy Roman Emperor

- March 13 – Joseph II, Holy Roman Emperor (d. 1790)
- March 17 – William Withering, British physician (d. 1799)
- March 20 – Jean Antoine Houdon, French sculptor (d. 1828)
- April 14 – Emperor Momozono of Japan (d. 1762)
- May 13 – Ingeborg Akeleye, Norwegian noble known for her love life (d. 1800)
- May 23 – Andrea Luchesi, Italian composer (d. 1801)
- June 11 – Joseph Warren, American Patriot, physician (d. 1775)
- June 26 – John Langdon, American politician (d. 1819)
- September 22 – Peter Simon Pallas, German zoologist (d. 1811)
- October 4 – Edmond Malone, Irish scholar (d. 1812)
- October 18 – Pierre Choderlos de Laclos, French general, author (d. 1803)
- October 24 – Johann August von Starck, German pastor (d. 1816)
- November 15 – Johann Kaspar Lavater, Swiss physiognomist (d. 1801)
- Date unknown –
  - Nikolaos Koutouzis, Greek painter, poet and priest (d. 1813)
  - Catherine Antonovna of Brunswick, German-Russian noble (d. 1807)
  - Gelelemend, Lenape chief (d. 1811)

1742

- January 8 – Philip Astley, English circus organizer (d. 1814)
- March 9 – Michael Anckarsvärd, Swedish politician (d. 1838)
- March 10 – Sampson Salter Blowers, American lawyer, jurist (d. 1842)

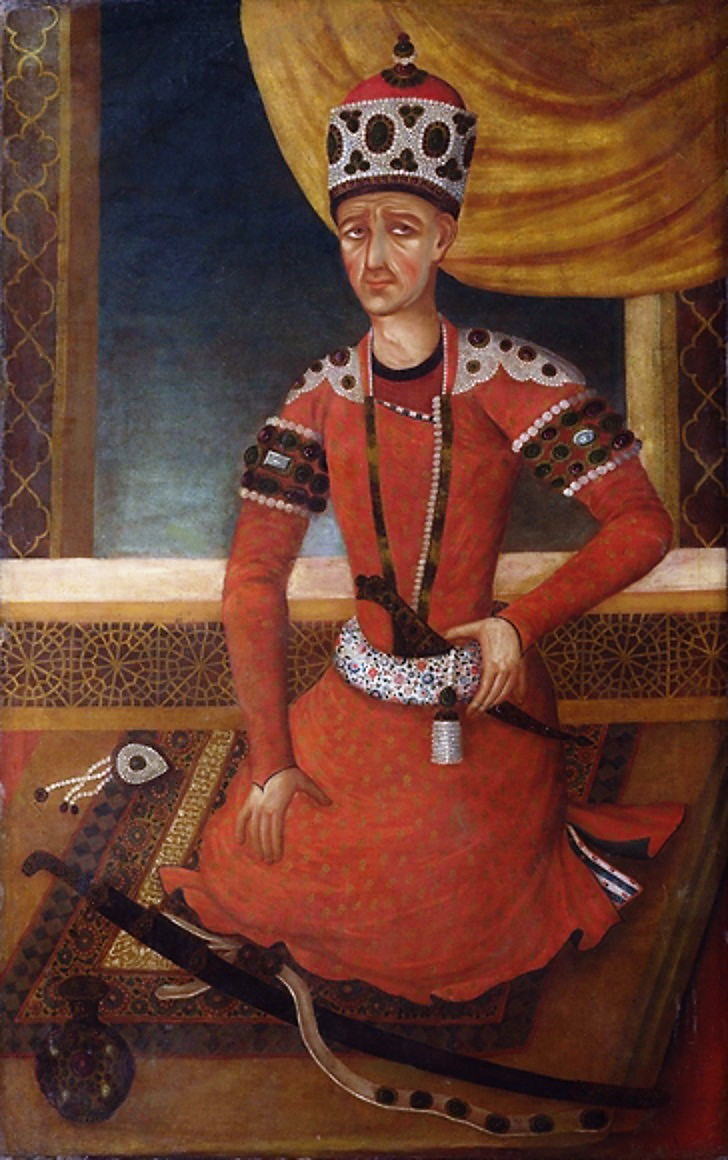
Agha Mohammad Khan Qajar

- March 14 – Agha Mohammad Khan Qajar, Iranian king (d. 1797)
- March 12 – Aletta Haniel, German business person (d. 1815)
- April 28 – Henry Dundas, British statesman (d. 1811)
- May 6 – Jean Senebier, Swiss pastor, botanist (d. 1809)
- June 25 – Johann Schweighäuser, German classical scholar (d. 1830)
- June 26 – Arthur Middleton, American politician (d. 1787)
- June 28 – William Hooper, American statesman (d. 1790)
- July 21 – John Cleves Symmes, American statesman (d. 1814)
- July 27 – Nathanael Greene, American general (d. 1786)
- August 14 – Pope Pius VII (b. Barnaba Niccolò Maria Luigi Chiaramonti), Italian Benedictine (d. 1823)

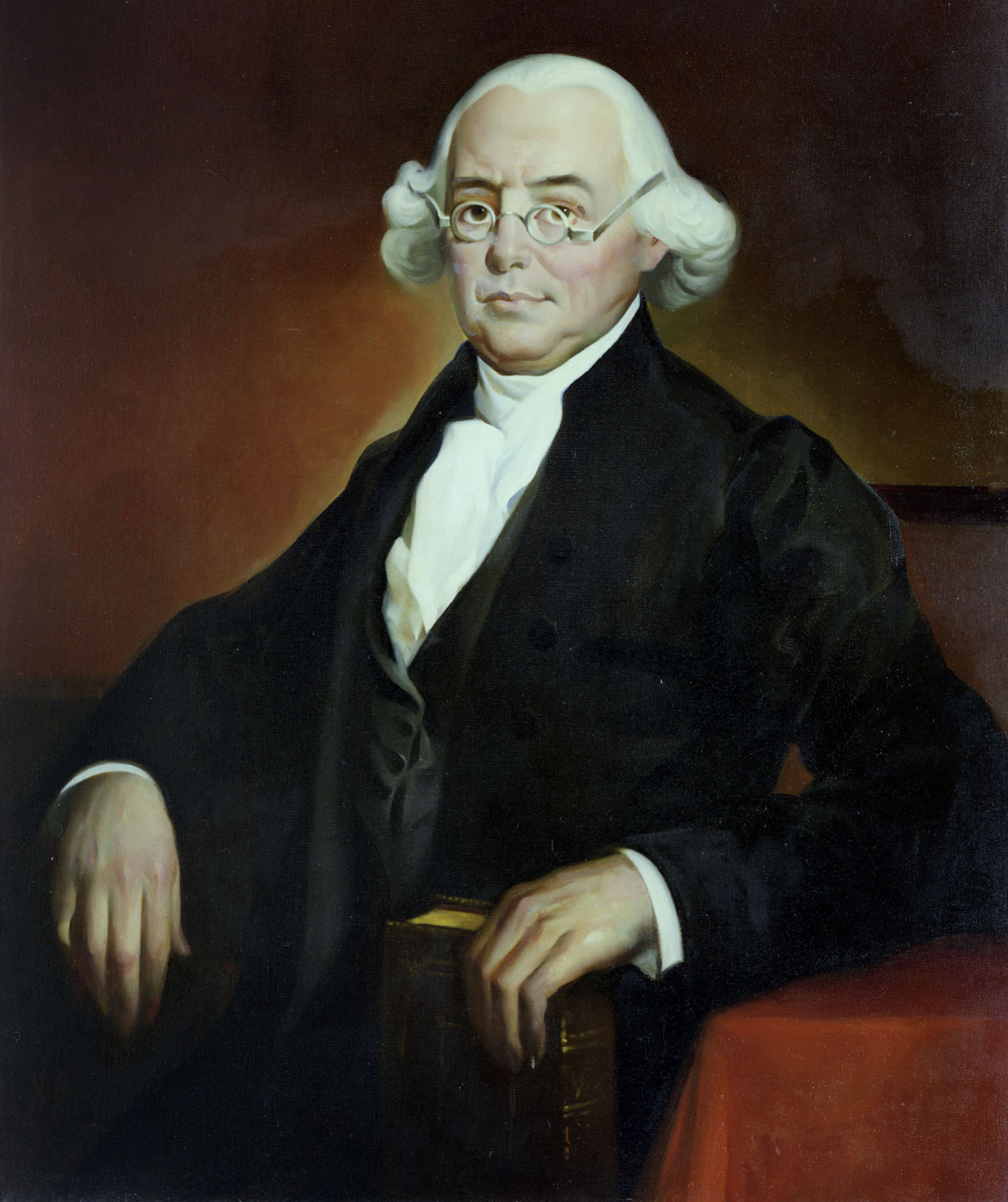
James Wilson

- September 14 – James Wilson, American politician, Associate Justice of the Supreme Court of the United States (d. 1798)
- October 3 – Anders Jahan Retzius, Swedish chemist, botanist (d. 1821)
- October 6 – Johan Herman Wessel, Norwegian poet (d. 1785)
- November 5 – Richard Cosway, English artist (d. 1821)

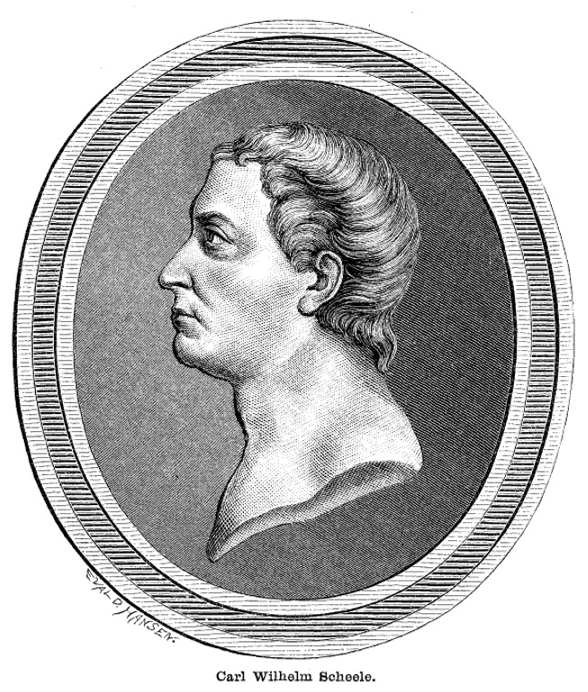
Carl Wilhelm Scheele

- December 9 – Carl Wilhelm Scheele, Swedish chemist (d. 1785)
- December 16 – Gebhard Leberecht von Blücher, Prussian general (d. 1819)
- December 26 (bapt.) – George Chalmers, Scottish antiquarian (d. 1825)
- date unknown – Túpac Amaru II, Peruvian indigenous rebel leader (d. 1781)
- date unknown – Rafaela Herrera, Nicaraguan heroine (d. 1805)
- date unknown – Francis Nash, American military officer (d. 1777)
- date unknown – Hendrik Frans de Cort, Flemish painter (d. 1810)

1743

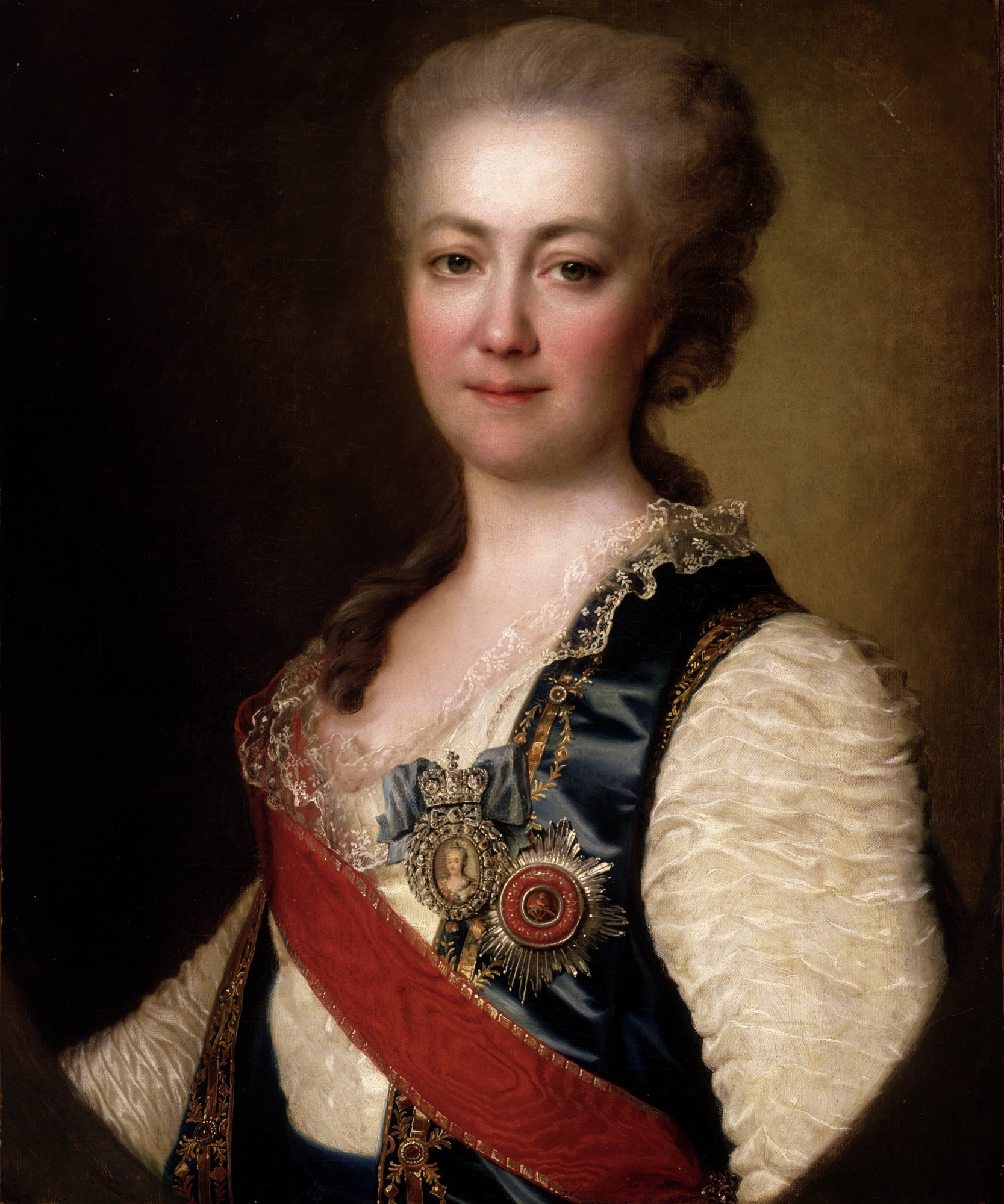
Yekaterina Vorontsova-Dashkova

- January 1 – Sir William Parker, 1st Baronet, of Harburn, British admiral (d. 1802)
- January 18 – Louis Claude de Saint-Martin, French philosopher, "le philosophe inconnu" (d. 1803)
- January 25 – Friedrich Heinrich Jacobi, German philosopher (d. 1819)
- February 13 – Sir Joseph Banks, British naturalist and botanist (d. 1820)
- February 14 – George Morgan, American merchant and Indian agent (d. 1810)
- February 19 – Luigi Boccherini, Italian composer (d. 1805)
- February 23 – Mayer Amschel Rothschild, German-born banker (d. 1818)
- February 28 – René Just Haüy, French "father of modern crystallography" (d. 1822)
- March – Joseph Brant, Mohawk leader (d. 1807)
- March 4 – Johann David Wyss, Swiss author (d. 1818)
- March 14 – Hannah Cowley, English dramatist and poet (d. 1809)
- March 28 (March 17 O.S.) – Yekaterina Vorontsova-Dashkova, Russian princess, courtier and patron of the arts and sciences (d. 1810)
- April – Etta Palm d'Aelders, Dutch-French feminist (d. 1799)
- April 1 – Richard Butler American general (d. 1793)
- April 13 – Thomas Jefferson, third President of the United States, author of the Declaration of American Independence (d. 1826)
- May 14 – Louis Lebègue Duportail French military leader in the Continental Army during the American Revolutionary War (d. 1802)
- May 17 – Seth Warner American revolutionary hero (d. 1784)
- May 20 – Toussaint Louverture, Haitian rebel (d. 1803)
- May 24 – Jean-Paul Marat, French revolutionary, doctor and scientist (d. 1793)
- June 2 – Alessandro Cagliostro, Italian Freemason (d. 1795)
- June 3
  - José Fernando de Abascal y Sousa, Spanish viceroy of Peru (d. 1821)
  - Lucia Galeazzi Galvani, Italian scientist (d. 1788)
- August 7 – Susan Carnegie, writer and founder of the first public asylum in Scotland (d.1821)
- August 26 – Antoine Lavoisier, French chemist (d. 1794)
- August 29 – Johann Jacob Ferber, Swedish mineralogist
- September 11 – Nikolaj Abraham Abildgaard, Danish painter (d. 1809)
- September 17 – Marquis de Condorcet, French mathematician, philosopher, and political scientist (d. 1794)
- October 20 – François Chopart, French surgeon (1795)
- November 11 – Carl Peter Thunberg, Swedish botanist (d. 1828)
- December 1 – Martin Heinrich Klaproth, German chemist, discoverer of uranium (1789), zirconium (1789), and cerium (1803) (d. 1817)
- December 23 – Ippolit Bogdanovich, Russian poet (d. 1803)
- date unknown
  - Károly Hadaly, Hungarian mathematician (d. 1834)
  - Elisabeth Christina von Linné, Swedish botanist (d. 1782)

1744

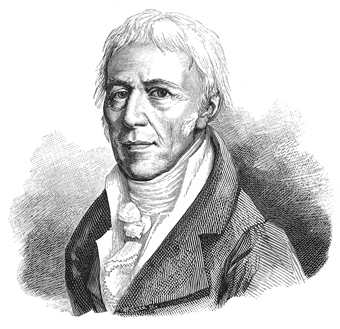
Jean-Baptiste Lamarck

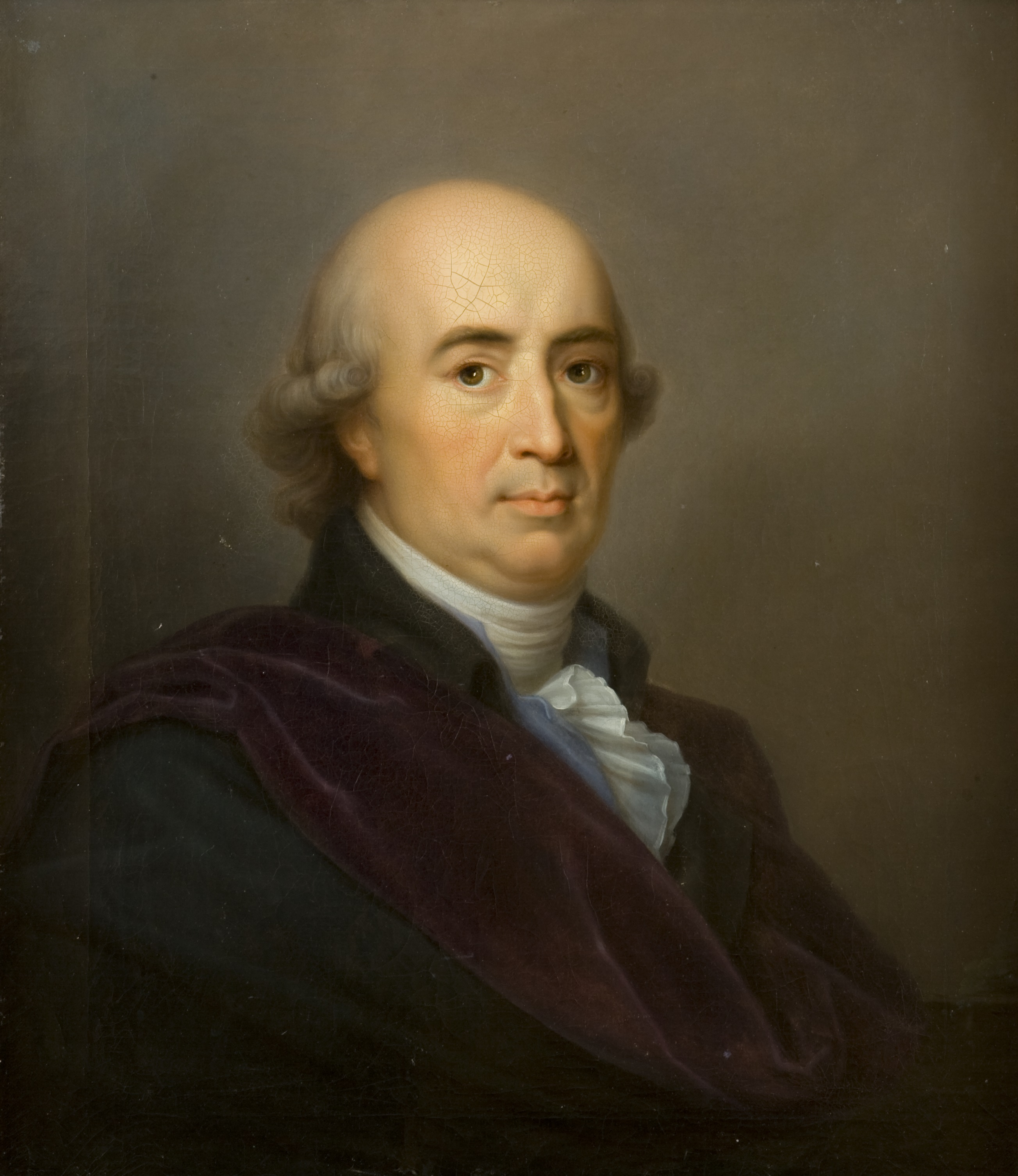
Johann Gottfried Herder

- February 6 – Pierre-Joseph Desault, French anatomist and surgeon (d. 1795)
- February 23 – Mayer Amschel Rothschild, German banker, founder of the Rothschild banking dynasty (d. 1812)
- May 19 – Charlotte of Mecklenburg-Strelitz, queen of George III (d. 1818)
- May 21 – Samuel Ireland, British author and engraver (d. 1800)
- May 31 – Richard Lovell Edgeworth, Anglo-Irish politician, writer and inventor (d. 1817)
- July 20 – Joshua Clayton, American politician (d. 1798)
- August 1 – Jean-Baptiste Lamarck, French naturalist (d. 1829)
- August 16 – Pierre Méchain, French astronomer (d. 1804)
- August 25 – Johann Gottfried Herder, German writer (d. 1803)
- September 25 – King Frederick William II of Prussia (d. 1797)
- October 13 – Henrik Johan Nauckhoff, Swedish admiral
- date unknown
  - Marie Barch, Danish ballerina (d. 1827)
  - Marie-Louise-Adélaïde Boizot, French engraver (d. 1800)

1745

- c. January – Isaac Titsingh, Dutch scholar, merchant-trader and ambassador (d. 1812)
- January 1 – Anthony Wayne, United States Army officer, statesman and member of the United States House of Representatives (d. 1796)
- January 6 – Jacques-Étienne Montgolfier, French inventor (d. 1799)
- January 7 – Johan Christian Fabricius, Danish zoologist (d. 1808)
- January 9 – Caleb Strong, American politician (d. 1819)
- February – Samuel Hearne, English explorer, fur-trader, author, and naturalist (d. 1792)
- February 2 – Hannah More, English religious writer, Romantic poet and philanthropist (d. 1833)

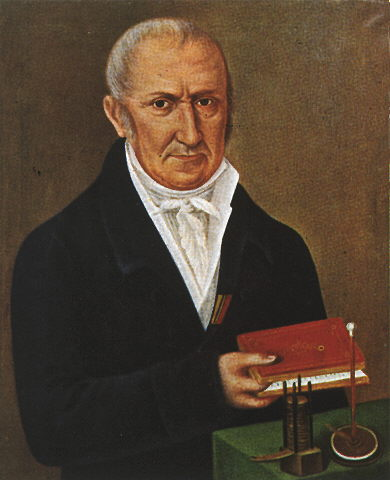
Alessandro Volta

- February 18 – Alessandro Volta, Italian physicist (d. 1827)
- February 20 – Henry James Pye, English poet (d. 1813)
- February 21 – Olof Tempelman, Swedish architect (d. 1816)
- February 24 – Fyodor Ushakov, a Russian Saint and Admiral (d. 1817)
- March 4
  - Charles Dibdin, English composer (d. 1814)
  - Kazimierz Pułaski, American Revolutionary War general (d. 1779)
- March 10 – John Gunby, Maryland soldier in the American Revolutionary War (d. 1807)
- March 25 – John Barry, officer in the Continental Navy during the American Revolutionary War and later in the United States Navy (d. 1803)
- April 1 – Robert H. Harrison, American jurist and lieutenant colonel of the Continental Army (d. 1790)
- April 6 – Thomas Peters, Dutch supercentenarian (d. 1857)
- April 20 – Philippe Pinel, French physician (d. 1826)
- April 29 – Oliver Ellsworth, American founding father and 3rd Chief Justice of the United States Supreme Court (d. 1807)
- July 8 – Sara Banzet, French educator and diarist (d. 1774)
- July 13 – Robert Calder, British naval officer (d. 1818)
- July 17 – Timothy Pickering, American politician (d. 1829)
- August 20 – Francis Asbury, American Methodist Bishop (d. 1816)
- August 30 – Johann Hieronymus Schröter, German astronomer (d. 1816)
- September 4 – Schneur Zalman of Liadi, Russian rabbi and founder of Chabad (d. 1812)
- September 16 – Mikhail Illarionovich Kutuzov, Russian field marshal (d. 1813)
- November 13 – Valentin Haüy, French educator, founder of the first school for the blind (d. 1822)
- December 2 – Queen Jeongsun, Korean regent (d. 1805)
- December 15 – Johann Gottfried Koehler, German astronomer (d. 1801)
- December 24 – William Paterson, American politician and Associate Justice of the Supreme Court of the United States (d. 1806)
- date unknown
  - Micaela Bastidas Puyucahua, Peruvian indigenous rebel leader (d. 1781)
  - Gim Hongdo (Danwon), Korean painter (d. 1806)
  - Olaudah Equiano (Gustavus Vassa), slave, abolitionist, author (d. 1797)

1746

- January 4 – Benjamin Rush, a Founding Father of the United States (d. 1813)
- January 12 – Johann Heinrich Pestalozzi, Swiss pedagogue (d. 1827)
- January 24 – King Gustav III of Sweden (d. 1792)

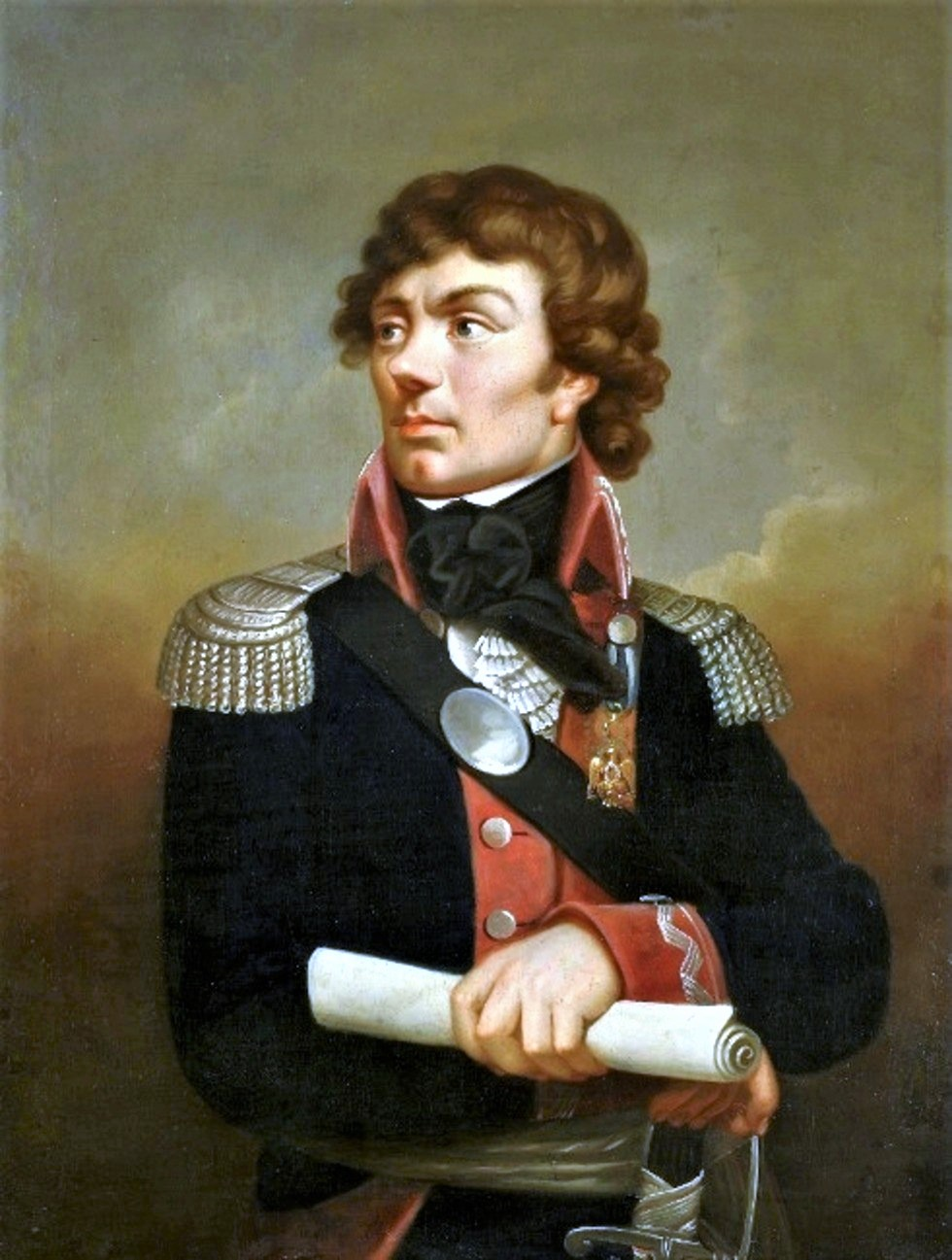
Tadeusz Kościuszko

- February 4 – Tadeusz Kościuszko, Polish general and nationalist (d. 1817)
- February 25 – Charles Cotesworth Pinckney, American politician and soldier (d. 1825)
- March 3 – Izabela Czartoryska, Polish magnate princess (d. 1835)
- March 7 – André Michaux, French botanist (d. 1802)

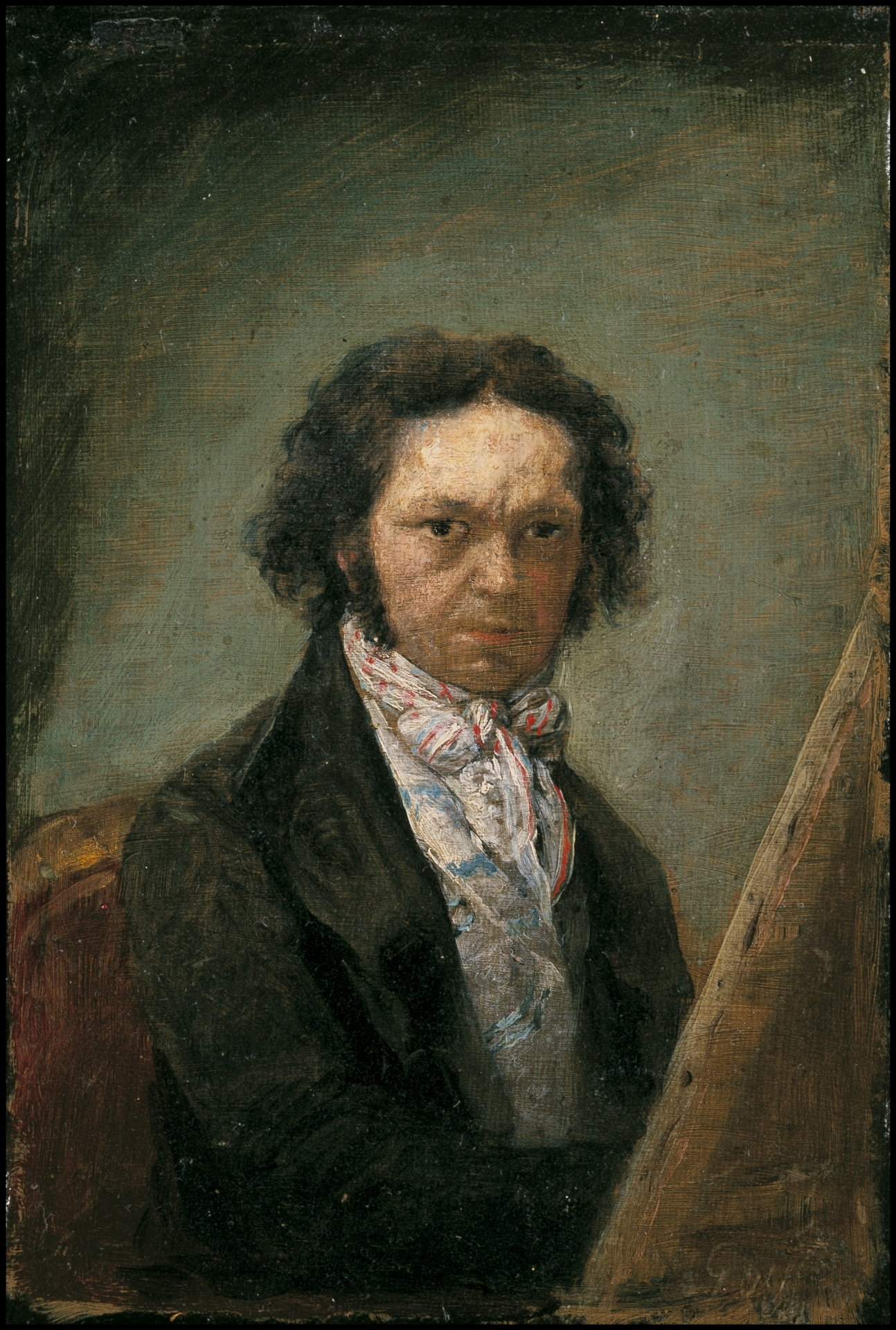
Francisco Goya

- March 30 – Francisco Goya, Spanish painter (d. 1828)
- April 4 – John Andrews, American clergyman, Provost of the University of Pennsylvania (d. 1813)
- May 9 – Gaspard Monge, French mathematician and geometer (d. 1818)
- June 3 – James Hook, English composer (d. 1827)
- July 3 – Henry Grattan, Irish politician (d. 1820)
- July 16 – Giuseppe Piazzi, Italian astronomer (d. 1826)
- July 23 – Bernardo de Gálvez, Spanish military leader, aids the United States in its quest for independence in the American Revolutionary War (d. 1786)
- July 30 – Louise du Pierry, French astronomer (d. 1807)
- September 28 – Sir William Jones, English philologist (d. 1794)
- October 7 – William Billings, American composer (d. 1800)
- November 27 – Robert R. Livingston, American signer of the Declaration of Independence (d. 1813)
- December 29 – Saverio Cassar, Gozitan priest and rebel leader (d. 1805)
- date unknown
  - Hong Liangji, Chinese scholar, statesman, political theorist and philosopher
  - Isaac Swainson, English botanist (d. 1812)
  - Victor d'Hupay, French philosopher and writer (d. 1818)
  - Ekaterina Kozitskaya, Russian industrialist (d. 1833)
  - Ebenezer Pemberton, American educator (d. 1835)

1747

- January 10 – Abraham-Louis Breguet, Swiss horologist, inventor (d. 1823)
- January 15 – John Aikin, English doctor and writer (d. 1822)
- January 19 – Johann Elert Bode, German astronomer (d. 1826)
- February 21 – Eugenio Espejo, Ecuadorian scientist (d. 1795)
- February 28 – Justin Morgan, American horse breeder and composer (d. 1798)

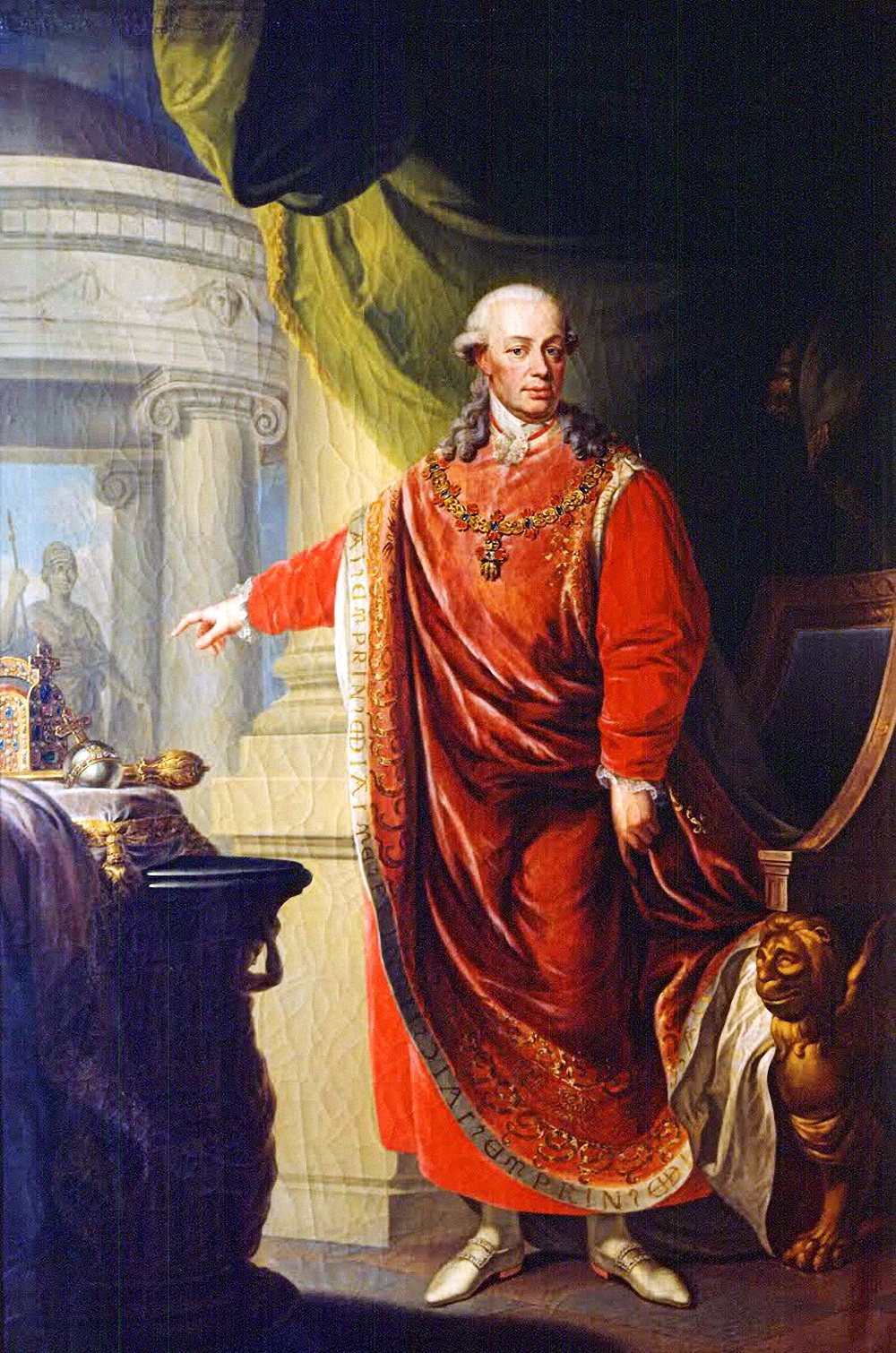
Leopold II, Holy Roman Emperor

- May 5 – Leopold II, Holy Roman Emperor (d. 1792)
- May 7 – Judith van Dorth, Dutch Orangist (d. 1799)
- June 23 – Michele Troja, Italian physician (d. 1827)
- July 2 – Rose Bertin, French fashion designer (d. 1813)
- July 6 – John Paul Jones, American naval captain (d. 1792)
- September 9 – Thomas Coke, first American Methodist Bishop (d. 1814)
- October 8 – Jean-François Rewbell, French politician (d. 1807)
- September 12 – Caleb Brewster, Patriot spy during the American Revolutionary War (d. 1827)
- December 12 – Anna Seward, English writer (d. 1809)
- December 31 – Gottfried August Bürger, German poet (d. 1794)
- date unknown
  - François Tourte, French musical instrument maker (d. 1835)
  - Francis Salvador, American patriot (d. 1776)
  - Anne Pépin, Senegalese Signara (d. 1837)
  - Grigory Shelikhov, Russian merchant (d. 1795)

1748

- January 19 – Antonio Carnicero, Spanish painter (d. 1814)
- February 2 – Adam Weishaupt, German founder of the Order of the Illuminati (d. 1811)

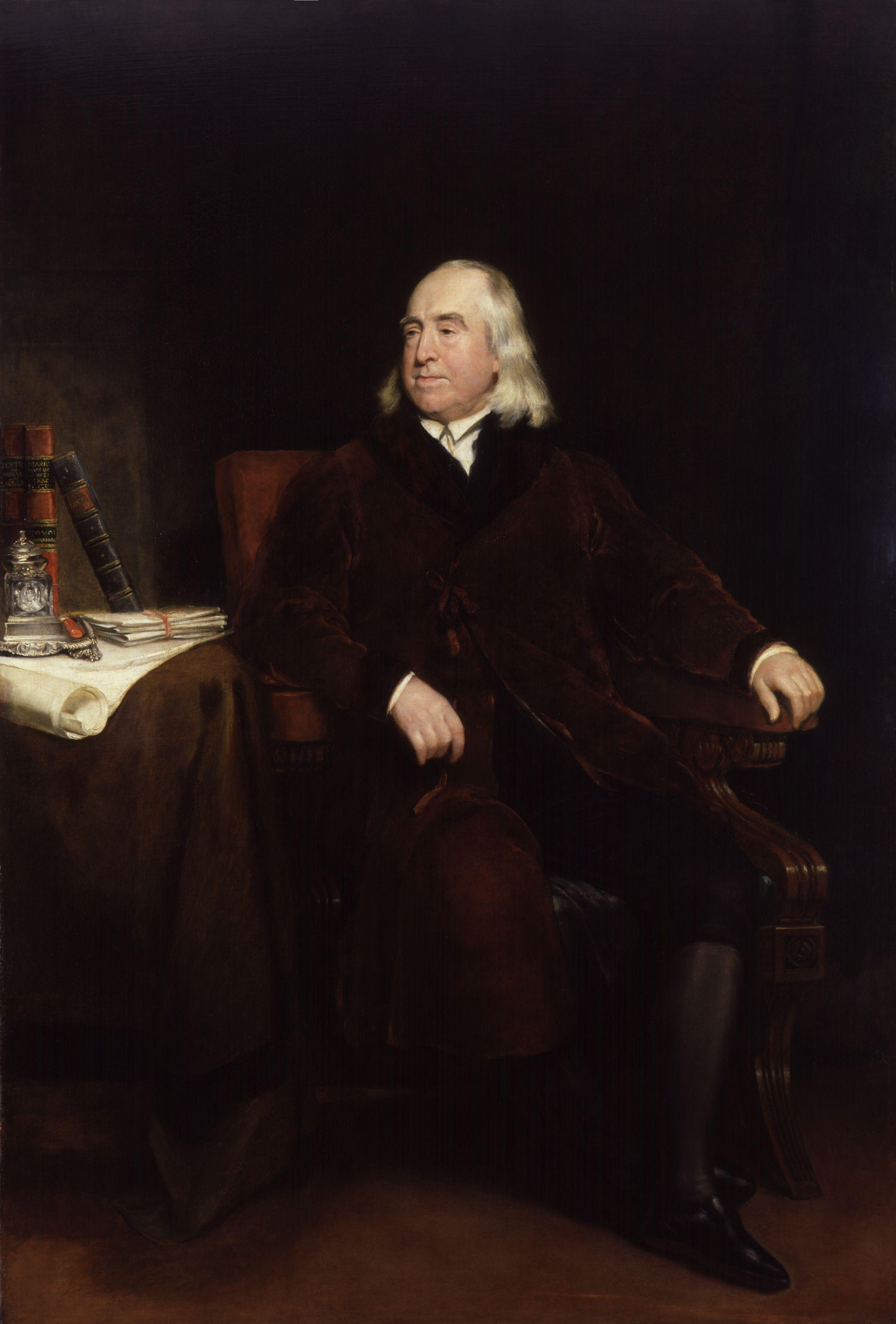
Jeremy Bentham

- February 15 – Jeremy Bentham, English philosopher (d. 1832)
- February 22 – Timothy Dexter, American businessman (d. 1806)
- February 27 – Anders Sparrman, Swedish naturalist (d. 1820)
- March 5
  - William Shield, English violinist, composer (d. 1829)
  - Jonas C. Dryander, Swedish botanist (d. 1810)
- March 8 – William V, Prince of Orange (d. 1806)
- March 10 – John Playfair, Scottish scientist (d. 1819)
- April 12 – Antoine Laurent de Jussieu, French botanist (d. 1836)
- April 13 – Joseph Bramah, English inventor, locksmith (d. 1814)
- April 27
  - Pierre-Louis Ginguené, French author (d. 1816)
  - Adamantios Korais, Greek scholar (d. 1833)
- May 3 – Emmanuel Joseph Sieyès, French cleric, constitutional theorist (d. 1836)
- May 7 – Olympe de Gouges, French playwright (d. 1793)
- May 10 – Louis Pierre Vieillot, French ornithologist (d. 1830)
- May 28 – Frederick Howard, 5th Earl of Carlisle (d. 1825)
- June 30 – Jacques Dominique, comte de Cassini, French astronomer (d. 1845)
- August 8 – Johann Friedrich Gmelin, German naturalist (d. 1804)

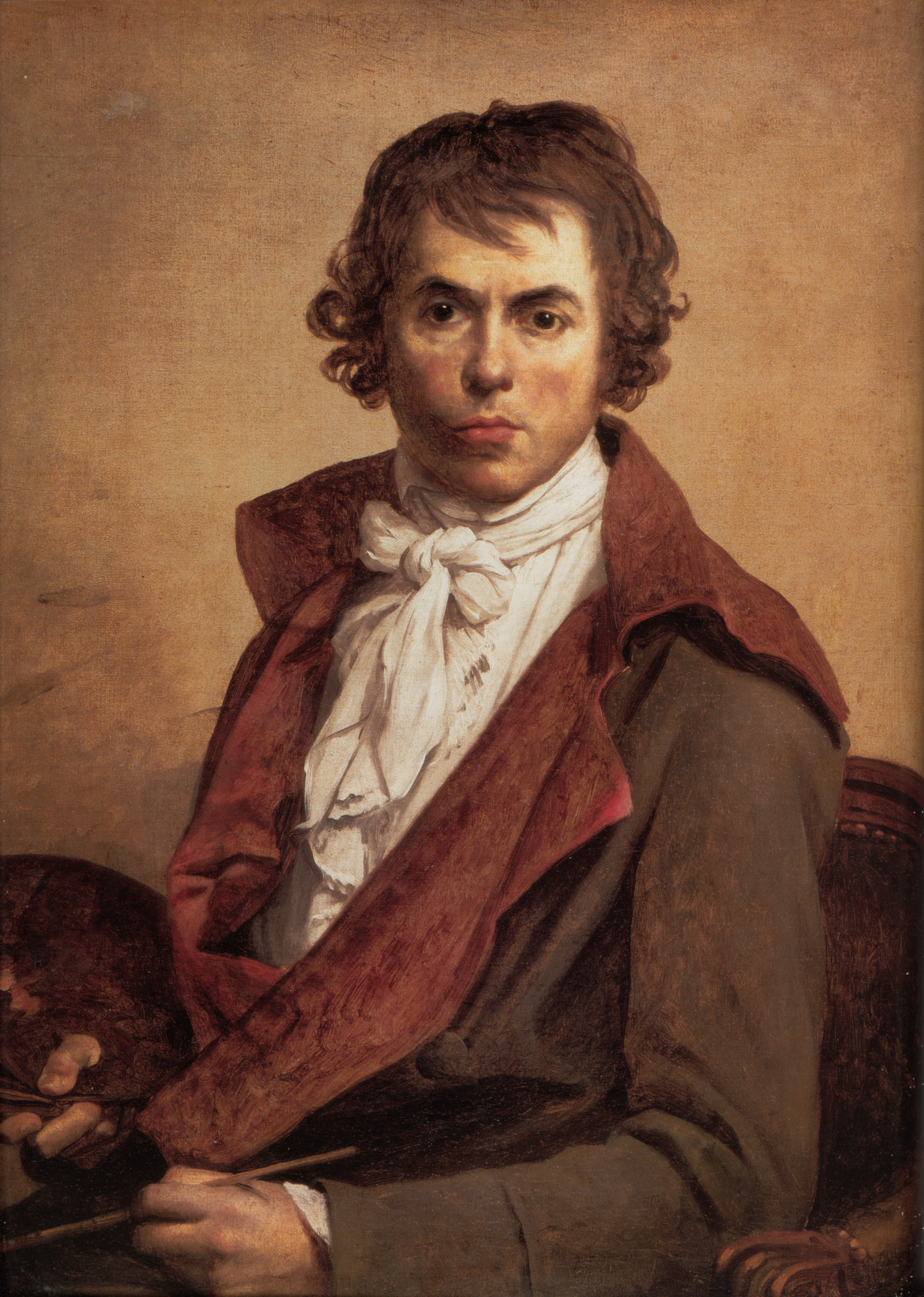
Jacques-Louis David

- August 9 – Bernhard Schott, German music publisher (d. 1809)
- August 30 – Jacques-Louis David, French painter (d. 1825)
- October 7 – King Charles XIII of Sweden (Charles II of Norway) (d. 1818)
- October 13 – Johann Dominicus Fiorillo, German painter, art historian (d. 1821)
- November 11 – King Charles IV of Spain (d. 1819)
- November 13 – William Chalmers, Swedish merchant (d. 1811)
- December 9 – Claude Louis Berthollet, French chemist (d. 1822)
- December 14 – William Cavendish, 5th Duke of Devonshire (d. 1811)
- date unknown
  - Gioacchino Navarro, Maltese priest and poet (d. 1813)
  - James Sayers, English caricaturist (d. 1823)
  - Timur Shah Durrani, Afghan king (d. 1793)
  - Thomas Holloway, English portrait painter, engraver (d. 1827
  - Stylianos Vlasopoulos, Greek judge, writer (d. 1822)

1749

- January 13 – Friedrich Müller, German painter, narrator, lyricist and dramatist (d. 1825)
- January 16 – Vittorio Alfieri, Italian dramatist (d. 1803)
- January 24 – Charles James Fox, English politician (d. 1806)
- January 29 – King Christian VII of Denmark (d. 1808)
- March 9 – Honoré Gabriel Riqueti, comte de Mirabeau, French politician (d. 1791)
- March 10 – Lorenzo Da Ponte, Italian librettist (d. 1838)

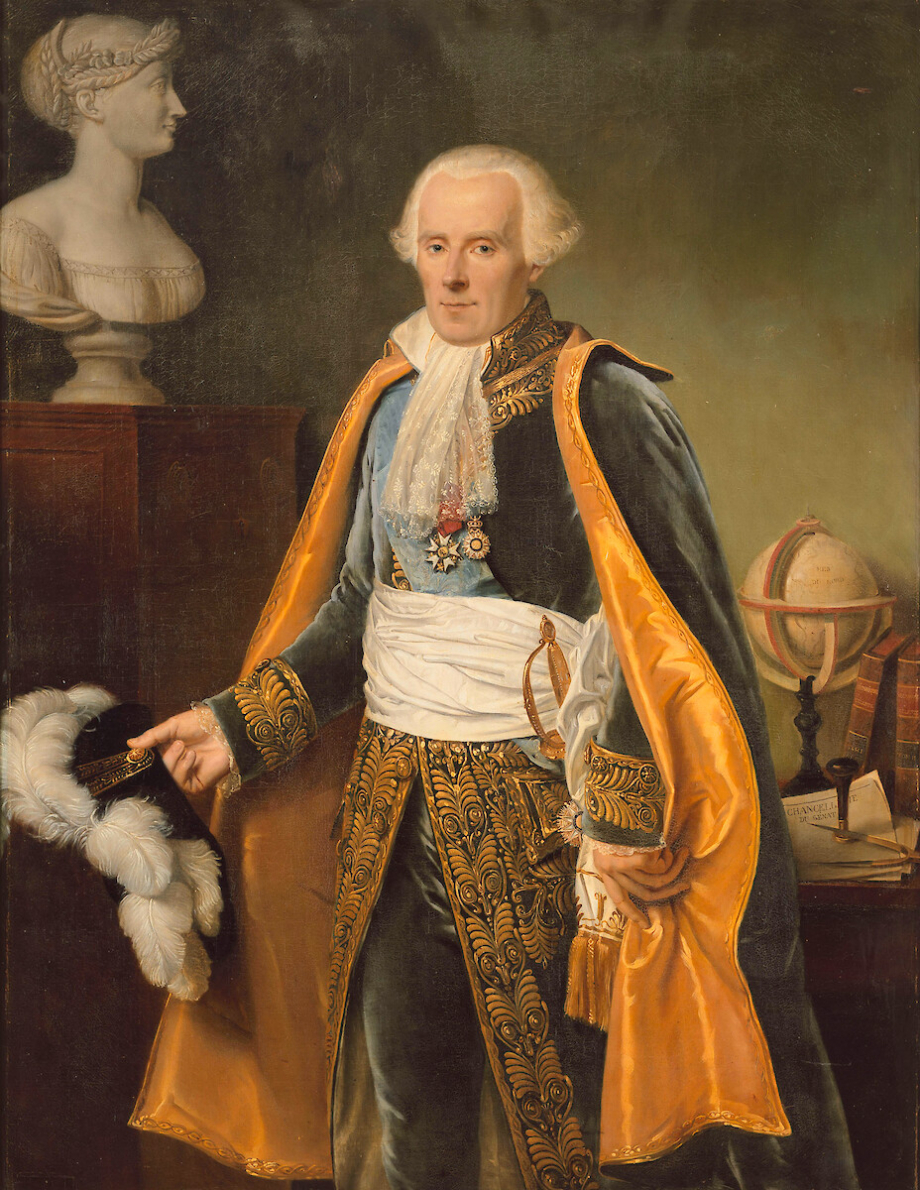
Pierre Simon de Laplace

- March 23 – Pierre-Simon Laplace, French mathematician, astronomer (d. 1827)
- March 23 – Ulla von Höpken, Swedish courtier, influential socialite (d. 1810)
- May 17 – Edward Jenner, English physician (d. 1823)
- April 11 – Adélaïde Labille-Guiard, French portrait painter (d. 1803)
- June 15 – Georg Joseph Vogler, German composer (d. 1814)
- June 19 – Jean-Marie Collot d'Herbois, French revolutionary (d. 1796)
- July 16 – Cyrus Griffin, last American President of the Continental Congress (d. 1810)

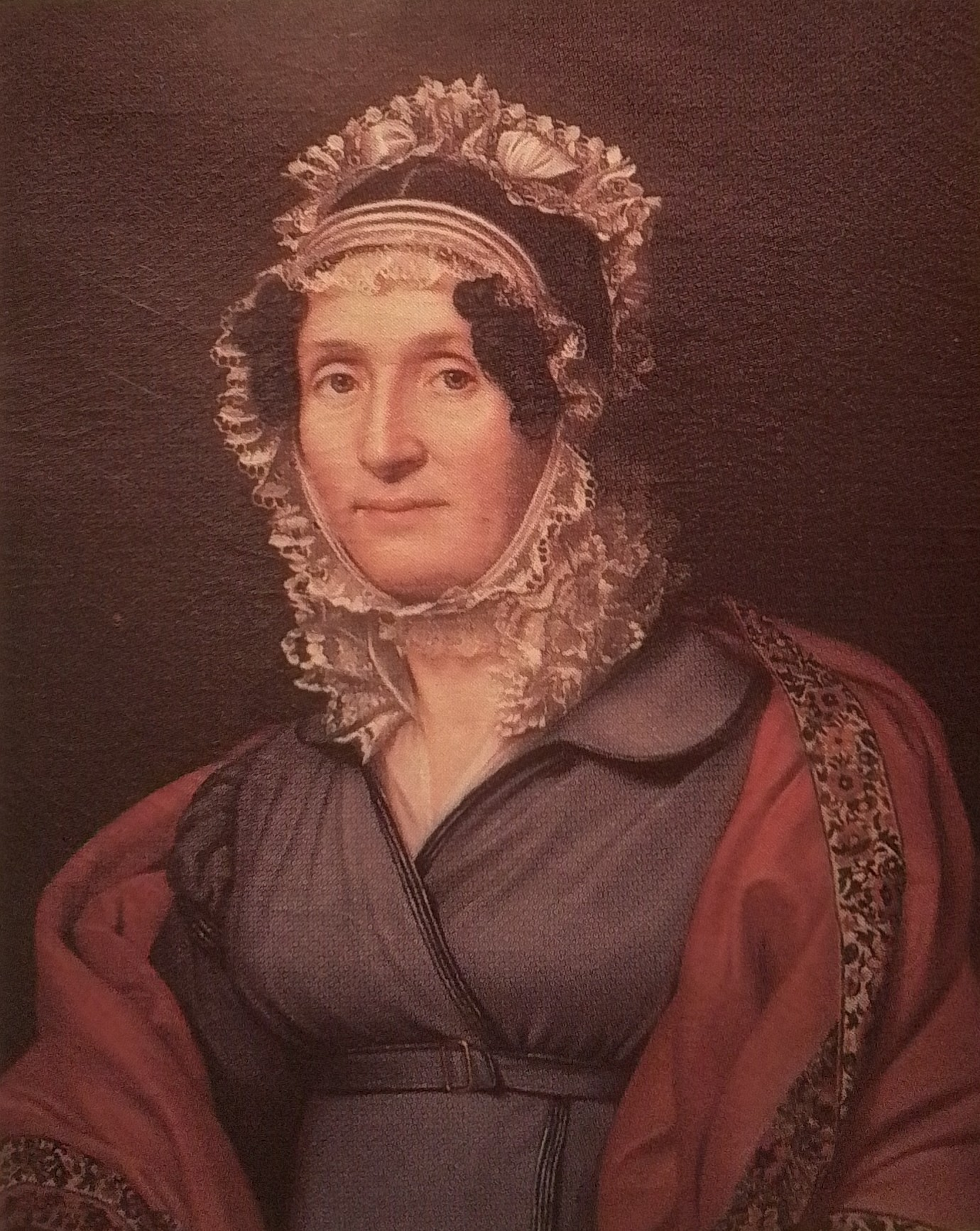
Madame Mère

- August 24 – Madame Mère (Letizia Ramolino Bonaparte) mother of Napoleon I (d. 1836)

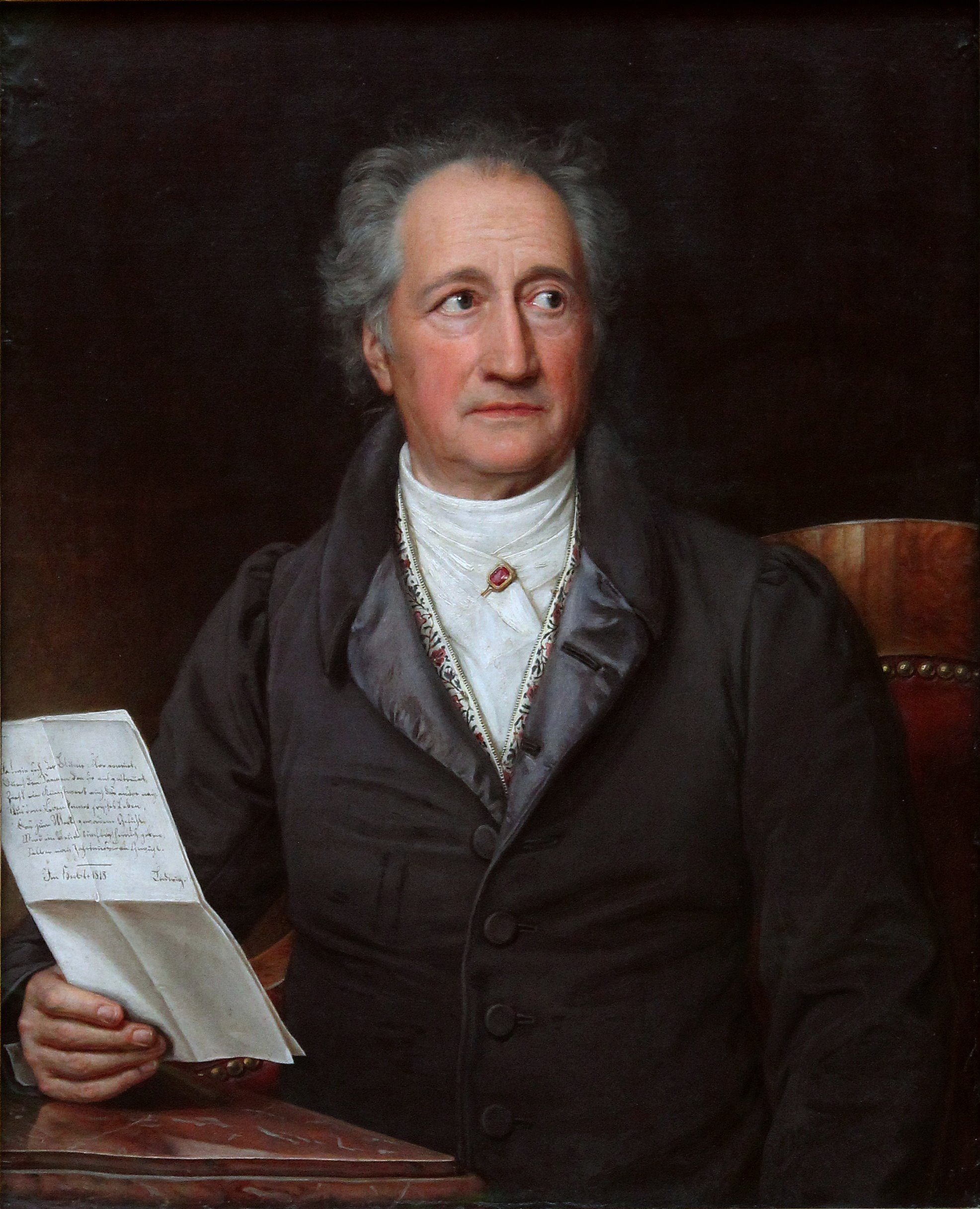
Johann Wolfgang von Goethe

- August 28 – Johann Wolfgang von Goethe, German writer and politician (d. 1832)
- September 25 – Abraham Gottlob Werner, German geologist (d. 1817)
- September 30 – Comte Siméon Joseph Jérôme, French jurist and politician (d. 1842)
- October 25 – Erik Magnus Staël von Holstein, Swedish ambassador (d. 1802)
- November 3 – Daniel Rutherford, Scottish physician, chemist and botanist (d. 1819)
- November 17 – Nicolas Appert French inventor (d. 1841)
- November 23 – Edward Rutledge, American statesman (d. 1800)
- December 2 – Elisabeth Berenberg, German banker (d. 1809)
- December 17 – Domenico Cimarosa, Italian composer (d. 1801)
- December 24 – Karl Gottfried Hagen, German chemist (d. 1829)
- December 25 – Samuel Jackson Pratt (known as Courtney Melmoth), English writer, poet and actor (d. 1814)
- date unknown – Charlotte Melmoth, British & American actress (d. 1823)

== Deaths ==
1740

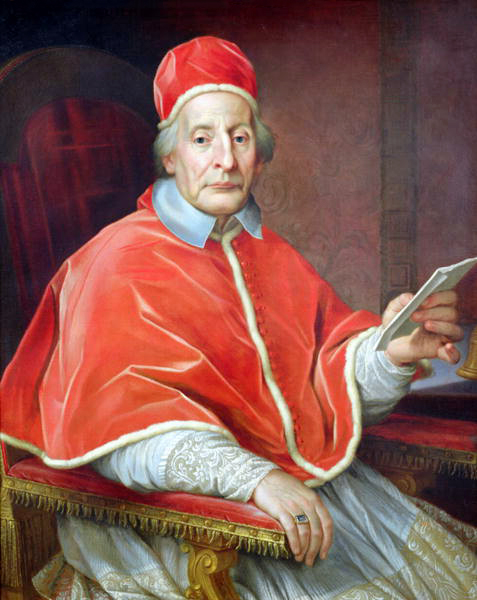
Pope Clement XII

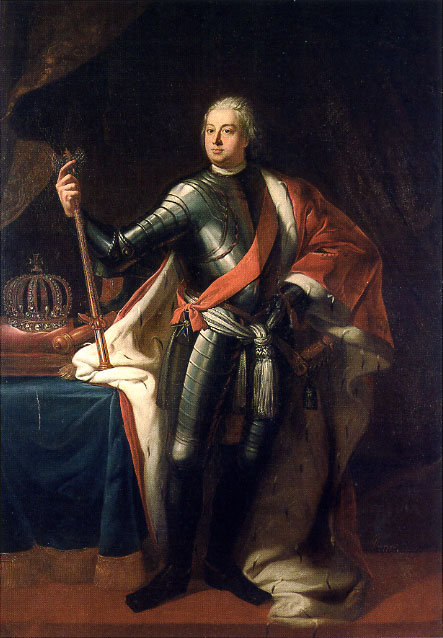
Frederick William I, King in Prussia

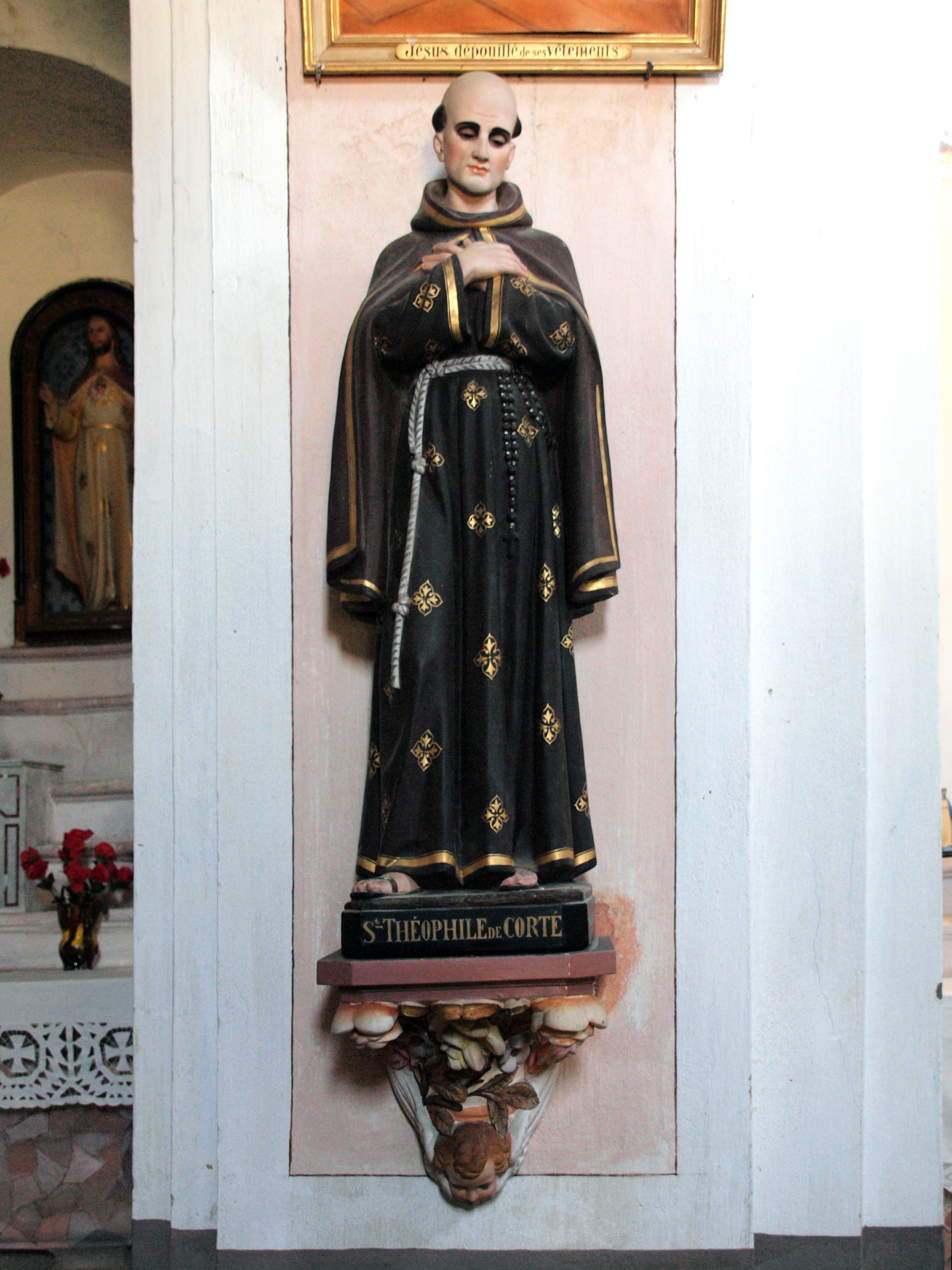
Saint Theophilus of Corte

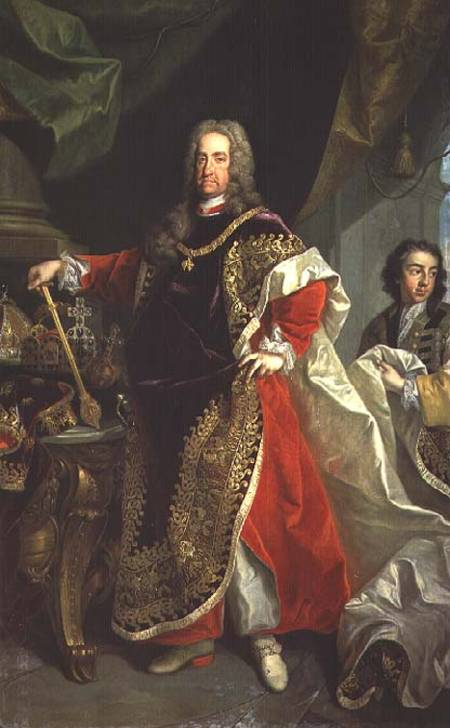
Charles VI, Holy Roman Emperor

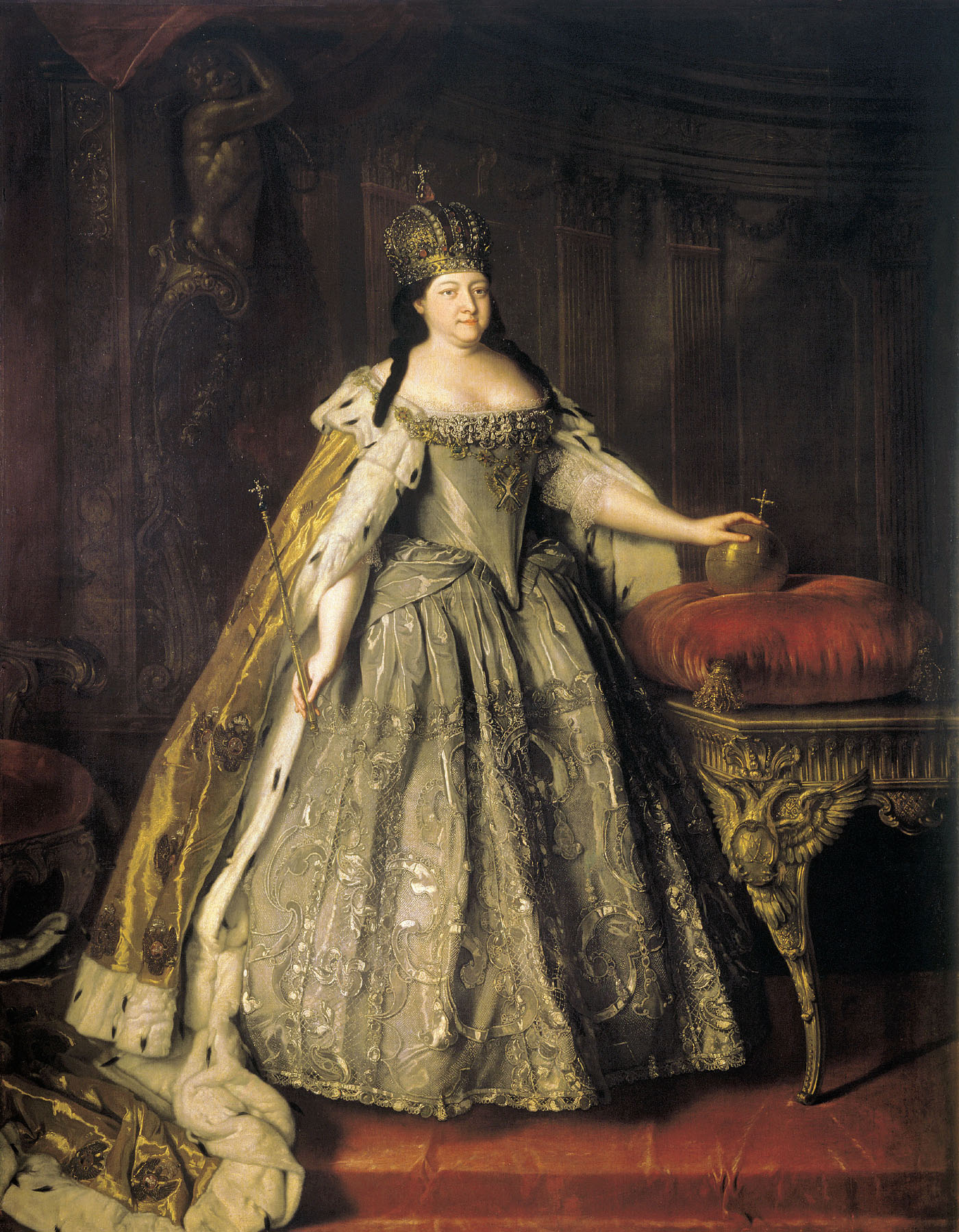
Anna, Empress of Russia

- January – Louise Élisabeth de Joybert, politically active Canadian governors' wife (b. 1673)
- January 5 – Antonio Lotti, Italian composer (b. 1667)
- January 17 – Matthias Buchinger, German artist (b. 1674)
- January 20 – Niccolò Comneno Papadopoli, Italian jurist of religious law and historian (b. 1655)
- January 21 – Nicholas Trott, colonial magistrate, South Carolina Chief Justice (b. 1663)
- January 27 – Louis Henri, Duke of Bourbon, Prime Minister of France (b. 1692)
- January 29 – Richard Lumley, 2nd Earl of Scarbrough (b. 1686)
- February 6 – Pope Clement XII (b. 1652)
- February 23 – Massimiliano Soldani Benzi, Italian artist (b. 1656)
- February 29 – Pietro Ottoboni, Italian cardinal (b. 1667)
- March 23 – Olof Rudbeck the Younger, Swedish scientist and explorer (b. 1660)
- April 28 – Bajirao I, Great Maratha warrior and Prime Minister of Marartha Empire (b.1700)
- April 23 – Thomas Tickell, English writer (b. 1685)
- May 17 – Jean Cavalier, French Protestant rebel leader (b. 1681)
- May 31 – Frederick William I, King in Prussia (b. 1688)
- June 1 – Samuel Werenfels, Swiss theologian (b. 1657)
- June 6 – Alexander Spotswood, British governor of Virginia Colony (b. 1676)
- June 17
  - Theophilus of Corte, Italian Roman Catholic priest, preacher and missionary, canonized (b. 1676)
  - William Wyndham, English politician (b. 1687)
- June 18 – Piers Butler, 3rd Viscount Galmoye, Anglo-Irish nobleman (b. 1652)
- July 2 – Thomas Baker, English antiquarian (b. 1656)
- September 20 – Francis Scobell, English politician (b. 1664)
- October 5 – Johann Philipp Baratier, German scholar (b. 1721)
- October 11 – Princess Magdalena Augusta of Anhalt-Zerbst, Duchess of Saxe-Gotha-Altenburg (b. 1679)
- October 20 – Charles VI, Holy Roman Emperor (b. 1685)
- October 28 – Anna, Empress of Russia (b. 1693)
- December 1 – John Abernethy, Irish Protestant minister (b. 1680)
- December 20 – Richard Boyle, 2nd Viscount Shannon, British military officer and statesman (b. 1675)
- December 30 – John Senex, English geographer (b. ca. 1678)

1741

- January 15 – Ramon Despuig, Spanish-born 67th Grandmaster of the Knights Hospitaller (b. 1670)
- February 13 – Johann Joseph Fux, Austrian composer (b. 1660)
- February 21 – Jethro Tull, British agriculturist (b. 1674)
- March 16 – Eleonora Luisa Gonzaga, Tuscan princess (b. 1686)
- March 17 – Jean-Baptiste Rousseau, French poet (b. 1671)
- March 31 – Pieter Burmann the Elder, Dutch classical scholar (b. 1668)
- April 10 – Celia Fiennes, English travel writer (b. 1662)
- May 21 – Henry Dawnay, 2nd Viscount Downe, Irish peer (b. 1664)
- May 24 – Lord Augustus FitzRoy, Royal Navy officer during the Battle of Cartagena de Indias (b. 1716)
- May 25 – Daniel Ernst Jablonski, German theologian (b. 1660)
- June 14 – Landgravine Caroline of Hesse-Rotenburg, German noble (b. 1714)
- June 18 – François Pourfour du Petit, French anatomist, ophthalmologist and surgeon (b. 1664)
- July 3 – Elisabeth Therese of Lorraine, Sardinian queen consort (b. 1711)

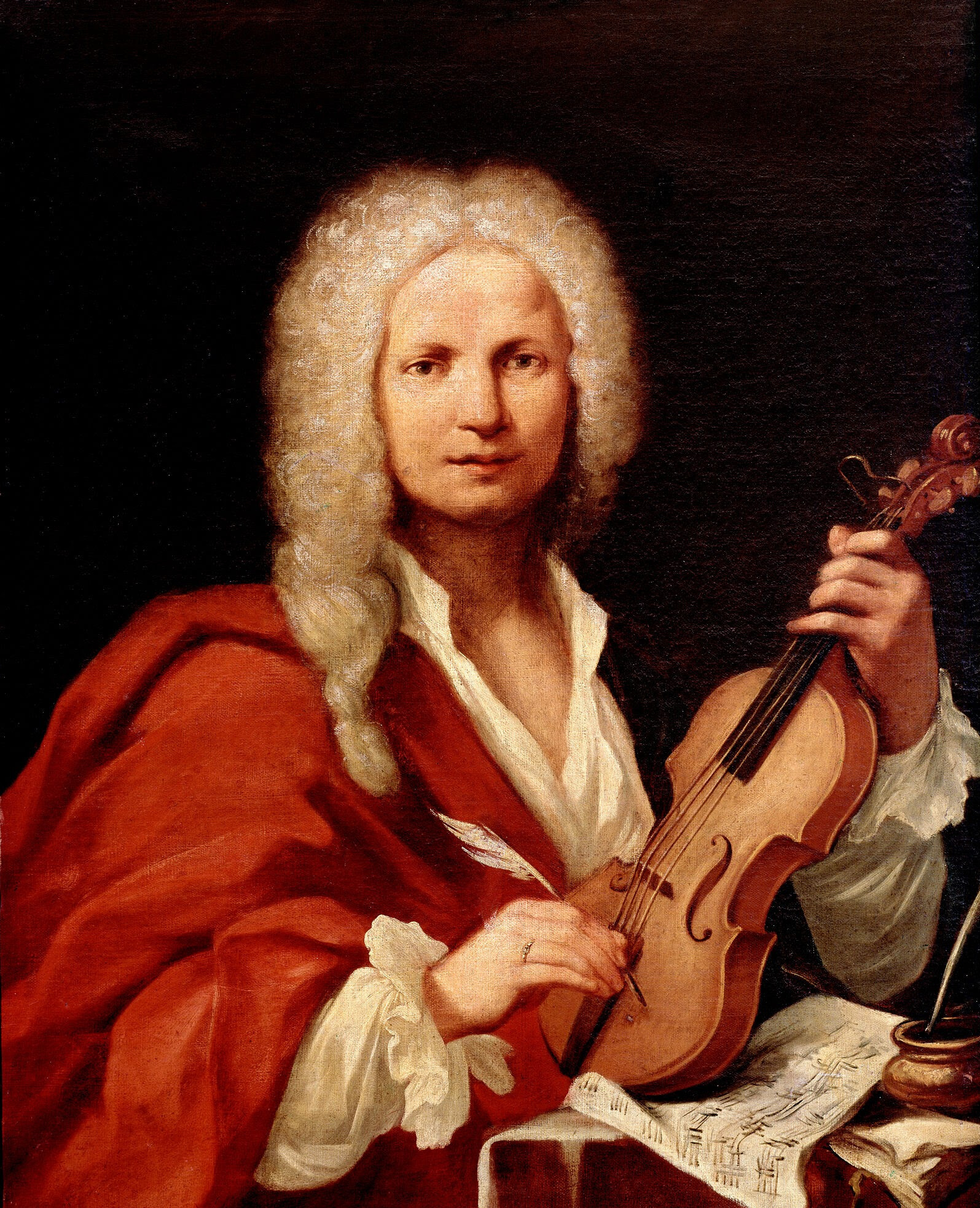
Antonio Vivaldi

- July 28 – Antonio Vivaldi, Italian composer (b. 1678)
- August 4 – Andrew Hamilton, American lawyer (b. 1676)
- August 31 – Johann Gottlieb Heineccius, German jurist (b. 1681)
- September 7 – Blas de Lezo, Spanish admiral (b. 1689)
- September 28 – Edward Bayly, Irish politician (b. 1684)
- October 12 – Joseph Talcott, British Governor of the Connecticut Colony for more than 17 years, since 1724. (b. 1670)
- November 18 – Stephen Delancey, major colonial New York figure (b. 1663)
- November 24 – Queen Ulrika Eleonora of Sweden (b.1688)
- December 14 – Charles Rollin, French historian (b. 1661)
- December 19 – Vitus Bering, Danish-born Russian explorer (b. 1681)
- December 21 – Bernard de Montfaucon, French Benedictine monk (b. 1655)
- December 31 – Andrew Archer, English politician (b. 1659)

1742

- January 1 – Peregrine Bertie, 2nd Duke of Ancaster and Kesteven, English statesman (b. 1686)

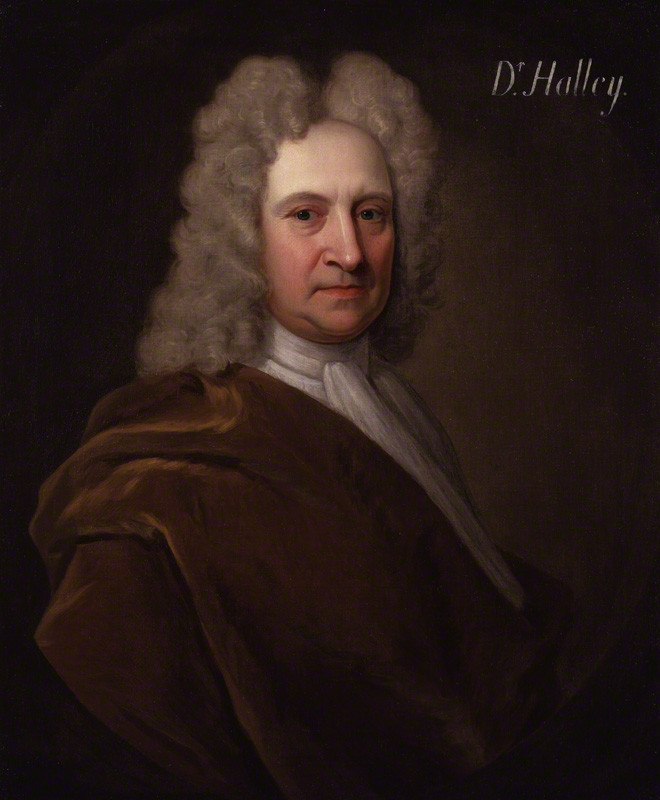
Edmond Halley

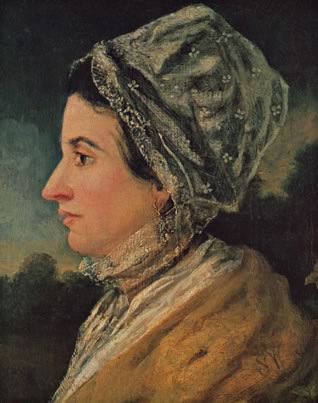
Susanna Wesley

- January 25 – Edmond Halley, English astronomer (b. 1656)
- February 22 – Charles Rivington, English publisher (b. 1688)
- March 16 – David-Henri de Meuron, Swiss Merchant (b. 1706)
- March 23 – Jean-Baptiste Dubos, French author (b. 1670)
- April 2 – James Douglas, Scottish physician, anatomist (b. 1675)
- April 15 – Samuel Shute, Governor of Massachusetts Bay and New Hampshire (b. 1662)
- April 17 – Arvid Horn, Swedish statesman (b. 1664)
- May 13 – Ludwig IX, Landgrave of Hesse-Darmstadt (b. 1719)
- May 21 – Lars Roberg, Swedish physician (b. 1664)
- May 26 – Pylyp Orlyk, Ukrainian Zaporozhian Cossack starshina, diplomat (b. 1672)
- June 18 – John Aislabie, British politician (b. 1670)
- June 20 – Charles Ewer, British politician.
- June 27 – Nathan Bailey, English philologist, lexicographer
- July 1 – Bohuslav Matěj Černohorský, Czech composer (b. 1684)
- July 2 – Robert Petre, 8th Baron Petre, British peer, renowned horticulturist (b. 1713)
- July 4 – Guido Grandi, Italian mathematician (b. 1671)
- July 9 – John Oldmixon, English historian (b. 1673)
- July 12 – Evaristo Abaco, Italian composer (b. 1675)
- July 14 – Richard Bentley, English scholar and critic (b. 1662)
- July 19 – William Somervile, English poet (b. 1675)
- July 23 – Susanna Wesley, mother of John and Charles Wesley, known as mother of Methodism. (b. 1669)
- July 30 – Nicholas Roosevelt (1658–1742), Dutch-American politician (b. 1658)
- August 14 – Maria van Lommen, Dutch gold- and silversmith and guild member (b. 1688)
- August 25 – Carlos Seixas, Portuguese composer (b. 1704)
- September 18 – Vincenzo Ludovico Gotti, Italian Catholic cardinal (b. 1664)
- September 22 – Frederic Louis Norden, Danish explorer (b. 1708)
- September 27 – Hugh Boulter, Irish Archbishop of Armagh (b. 1672)
- September 28 – Jean Baptiste Massillon, French bishop (b. 1663)
- November 12 – Friedrich Hoffmann, German physician, chemist (b. 1660)
- November 20 – Melchior de Polignac, French diplomat (b. 1661)
- November 24 – Andrew Bradford, American publisher (b. 1686)
- December 18 – William Fairfield, Massachusetts Speaker of the House of Deputies (b. 1662)
- December 31 – Karl III Philip, Elector Palatine (b. 1661)

1743

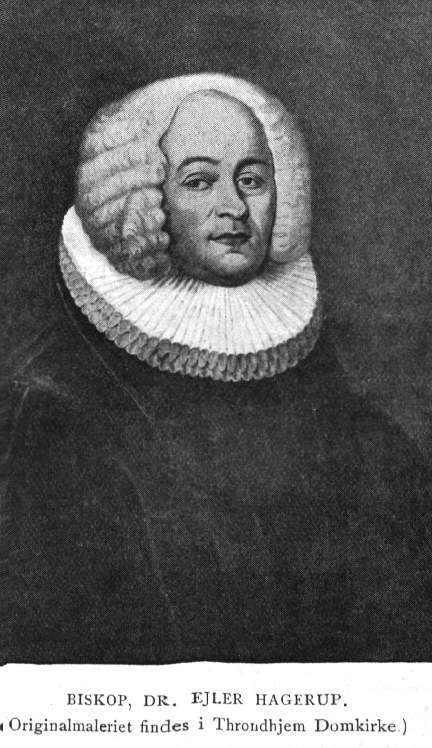
Eiler Hagerup

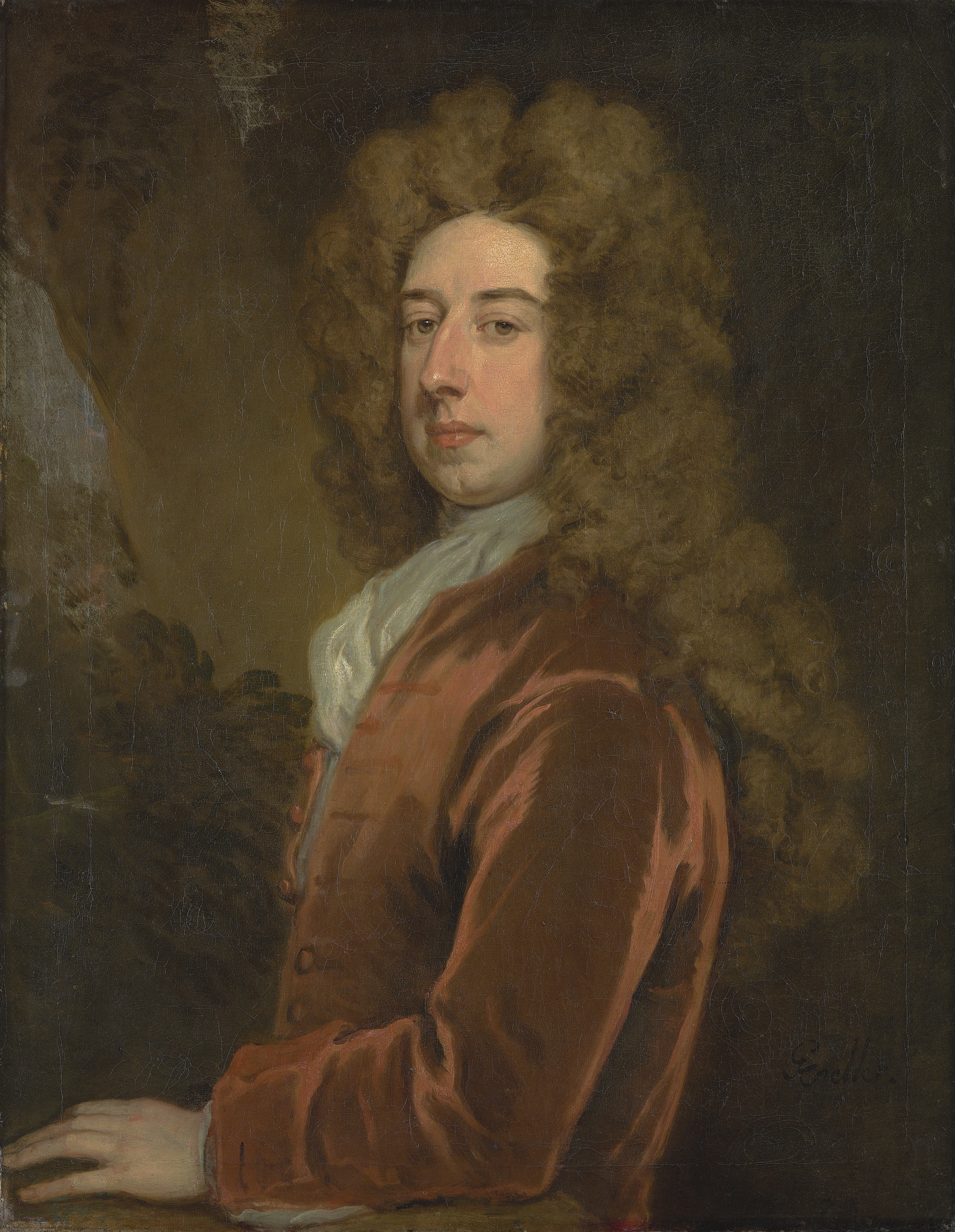
Spencer Compton, 1st Earl of Wilmington

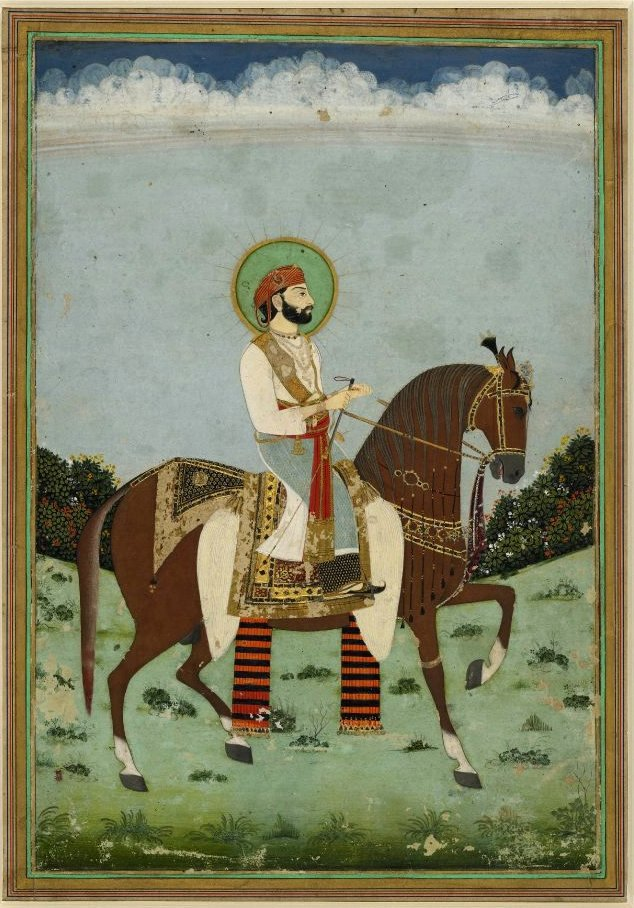
Jai Singh II

- January 3 – Ferdinando Galli-Bibiena, Italian architect/painter (b. 1657)
- January 29 – Cardinal André-Hercule de Fleury, Bishop of Fréjus, chief minister of France under Louis XV (b. 1653)
- January 29 – Charles-Irénée Castel de Saint-Pierre, French writer (b. 1658)
- February 1 – Giuseppe Ottavio Pitoni, Italian composer (b. 1657)
- February 7 – Lodovico Giustini, Italian composer (b. 1685)
- February 18 – Anna Maria Luisa de' Medici, last of the Medicis (b. 1667)
- March 22 – Emerentia von Düben, Swedish royal favorite (b. 1669)
- March 28 – Karl Frederick, Duke of Saxe-Meiningen, German noble (b. 1712)
- April 4 – Daniel Neal, English historian (b. 1678)
- April 12 – Augustine Washington, father of the future first President of the United States (b. 1694)
- April 20 – Alexandre-François Desportes, French painter (b. 1661)
- May 3 – Moritz Georg Weidmann, German bookseller (b. 1686)
- May 6 – Andrew Michael Ramsay, English Freemason (b. 1686)
- May 10 – Ehrengard Melusine von der Schulenburg, Duchess of Kendal and Munster (b. 1667)
- March 14 – Jean-Paul Bignon, French priest and man of letters (b. 1662)
- March 23 – Lancelot Blackburne, Archbishop of York (b. 1658)
- April 15 – Eiler Hagerup, Norwegian Roman Catholic bishop (b. 1685)
- June 16 – Louise Françoise, Princess of Condé, eldest daughter of Louis XIV and Madame de Montespan (b. 1673)
- July 2 – Spencer Compton, 1st Earl of Wilmington, British politician, Prime Minister of the United Kingdom (b. c. 1674)
- August 5 – John Hervey, 2nd Baron Hervey, English statesman and writer (b. 1696)
- August 30 – Henry Paget, 1st Earl of Uxbridge, British politician (b. 1663)
- September 14 – Nicolas Lancret, French painter (b. 1690)
- September 21 – Jai Singh II, King of Amber-Juiper, India (b. 1688)
- September 23 – Erik Benzelius the Younger, Swedish priest (b. 1675)
- October 4 – John Campbell, 2nd Duke of Argyll, Scottish soldier (b. 1678)
- December 27 – Hyacinthe Rigaud, French painter (b. 1659)
- date unknown
  - Manuela Desvalls Vergós, Spanish nun, agent and political controversialist
  - Pietro Paolo Troisi, Maltese artist (b. 1686)

1744

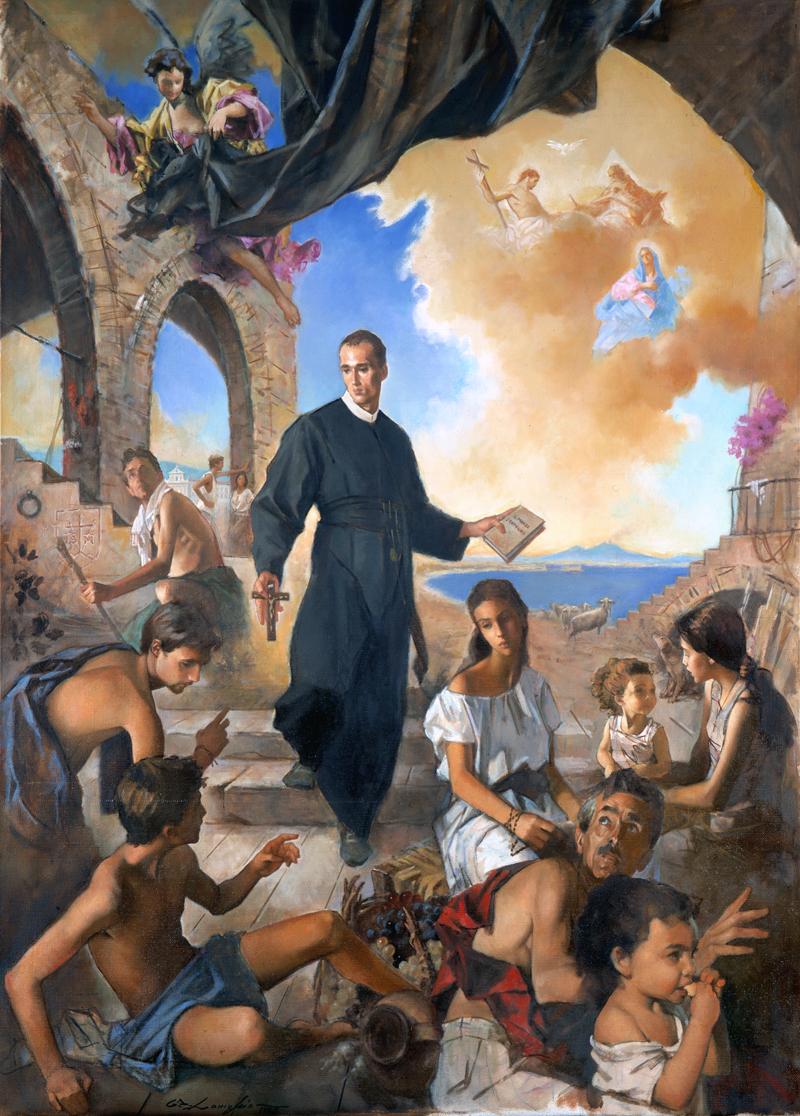
Blessed Januarius Maria Sarnelli

- January 11 – James Hamilton, 7th Earl of Abercorn (b. 1686)
- January 22 – Pierre Lepature, French artist (b. 1659)
- January 23 – Giambattista Vico, Italian philosopher and historian (b. 1668)
- January 26 – Ludwig Andreas von Khevenhüller, Austrian field marshal (b. 1683)
- February 11 – Hedvig Taube, mistress to King Frederick I of Sweden (b. 1714)
- February 14 – John Hadley, English mathematician (b. 1682)
- March 3 – Jean Barbeyrac, French jurist (b. 1674)
- March 4 – John Anstis, English herald (b. 1669)
- April 25 – Anders Celsius, Swedish astronomer (b. 1701)
- May 25 – Charles Edzard, Prince of East Frisia (b. 1716)
- May 30 – Alexander Pope, English writer (b. 1688)
- June 29
  - André Campra, French composer (b. 1660)
  - John Eames, English academic (b. 1686)
- June 30 – Januarius Maria Sarnelli, Italian Roman Catholic priest and blessed (b. 1702)
- July – Mihai Racoviță, Prince of Moldavia and Prince of Wallachia (b. c. 1660)
- August 9 – James Brydges, 1st Duke of Chandos, English patron of the arts (b. 1673)
- August 13 – John Cruger, Dutch-born Mayor of New York (b. 1678)
- August 26 – William Byrd II, prominent planter from Virginia (b. 1674)
- September 28 – Princess Thérèse of France, daughter of Louis XV (b. 1736)
- October 10 – Johann Heinrich Schulze, German professor and polymath (b. 1687)
- October 18 – Sarah Churchill, Duchess of Marlborough, English friend of Anne, Queen of Great Britain (b. 1660)
- October 31 – Leonardo Leo, Italian composer (b. 1694)
- December 8 – Marie Anne de Mailly-Nesle, French mistress of King Louis XV (b. 1717)
- December 23 – Élisabeth Charlotte d'Orléans, duchess and regent of Lorraine (b. 1676)
- date unknown – Catherine Jérémie, French-Canadian botanist (b. 1644)

1745

- January 16 – Josiah Franklin, English-born American businessman, father of Benjamin Franklin (b. 1657)
- January 20 – Charles VII, Holy Roman Emperor (b. 1697)
- February 23 – Joseph Effner, German architect (b. 1687)
- February 26 – Henry Scudamore, 3rd Duke of Beaufort, English nobleman (b. 1707)
- March 27 – Tommaso Crudeli, Florentine free thinker imprisoned by the Roman Inquisition (b. 1702)

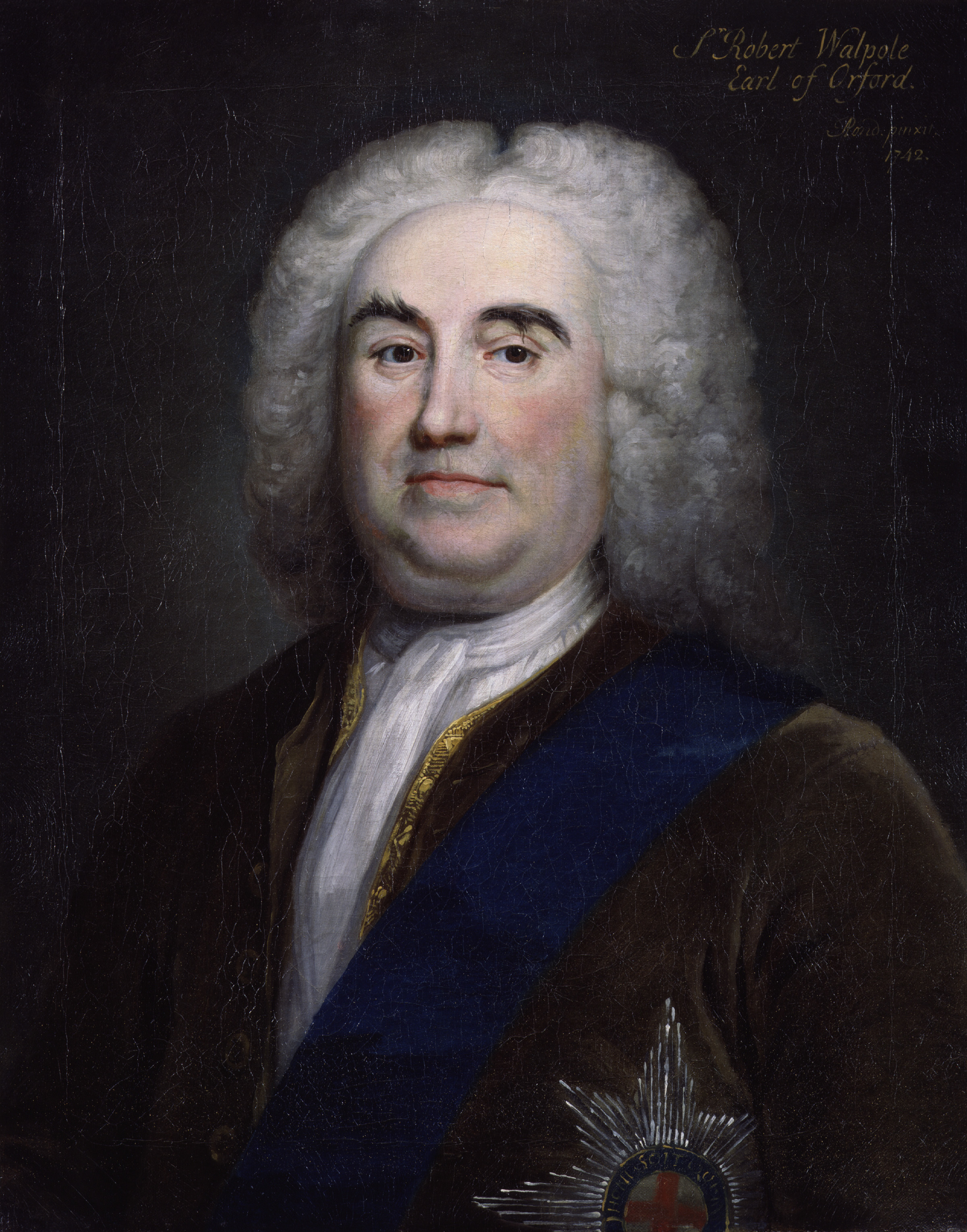
Robert Walpole

- March 18 – Robert Walpole, first Prime Minister of Great Britain (b. 1676)
- May 9 – Tomaso Antonio Vitali, Italian violinist and composer (b. 1663)
- May 22 – François-Marie, 1st duc de Broglie, French military leader (b. 1671)
- September 30 – Sir John Baird, 2nd Baronet, British politician (b. 1686)

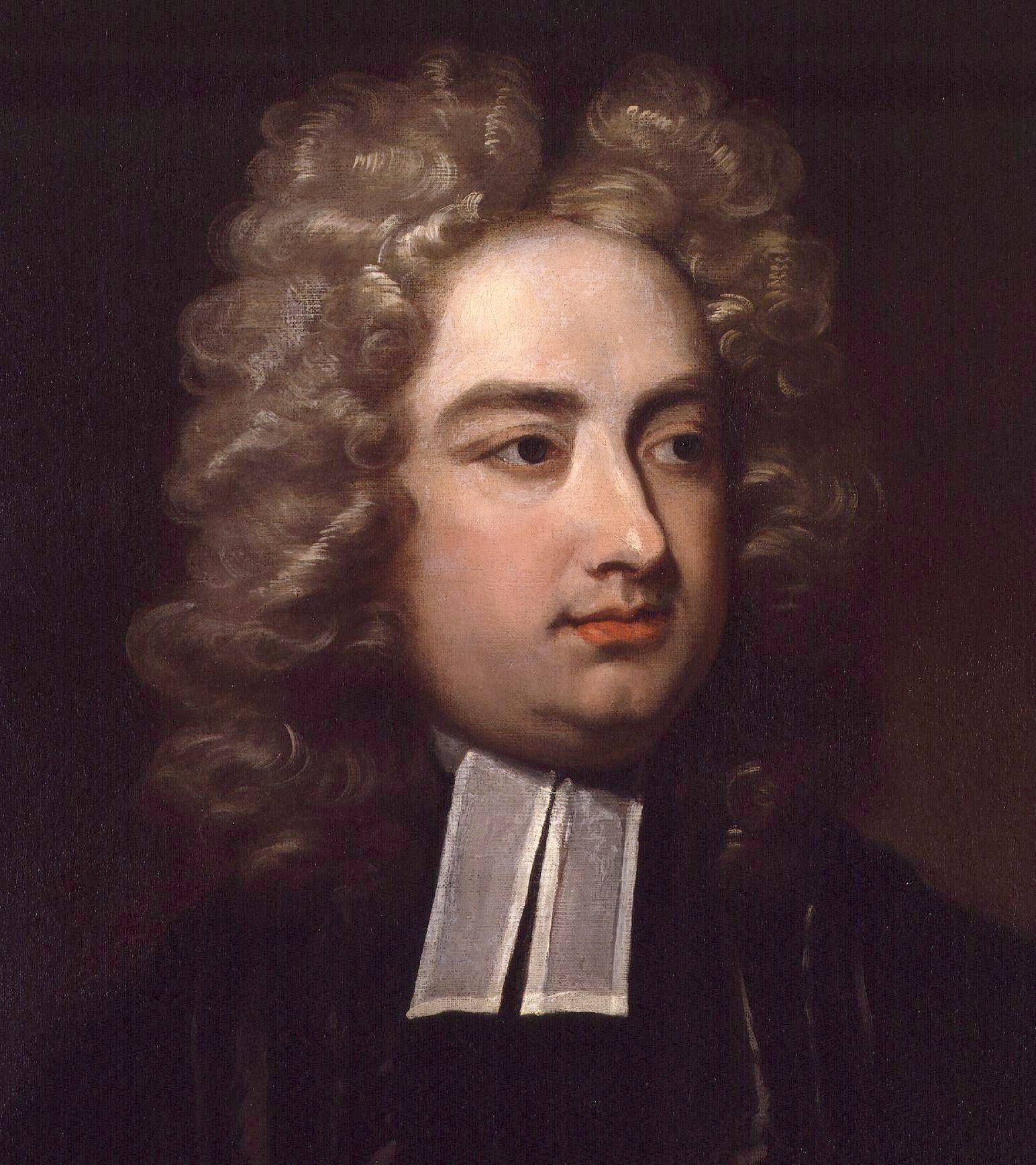
Jonathan Swift

- October 19 – Jonathan Swift, Anglo-Irish writer (b. 1667)
- October 22 – Isaac Greenwood, American mathematician (b. 1702)
- November 16 – James Butler, 2nd Duke of Ormonde, exiled Irish statesman and soldier (b. 1665)
- December 8 – Étienne Fourmont, French orientalist (b. 1683)
- December 19 – Jean-Baptiste van Loo, French painter (b. 1684)
- December 23 – Jan Dismas Zelenka, Bohemian composer (b. 1679)
- date unknown – Hedvig Catharina De la Gardie, Swedish-born salonnière (b. 1695)

1746

- February 4 – Robert Blair, Scottish poet and cleric (b. 1699)
- February 8 – Anton Josef Kirchweger, German writer
- February 26 – Thomas Watson, 3rd Earl of Rockingham, British politician (b. 1715)
- February 28 – Hermann von der Hardt, German historian (b. 1660)
- March 18 – Grand Duchess Anna Leopoldovna of Russia, regent of Russia (b. 1718)
- March 20 – Nicolas de Largillière, French painter (b. 1656)
- April 29 – William Flower, 1st Baron Castle Durrow, Irish politician (b. 1685)
- May 6 – William Tennent, Scottish-American theologian (b. 1673)
- May 13 – James Drummond, 3rd Duke of Perth, British noble (b. 1713)
- May 22 – Thomas Southerne, Irish playwright (b. 1660)
- June 14 – Colin Maclaurin, Scottish mathematician (b. 1698)
- July 2 – Thomas Baker, English antiquarian (b. 1656)

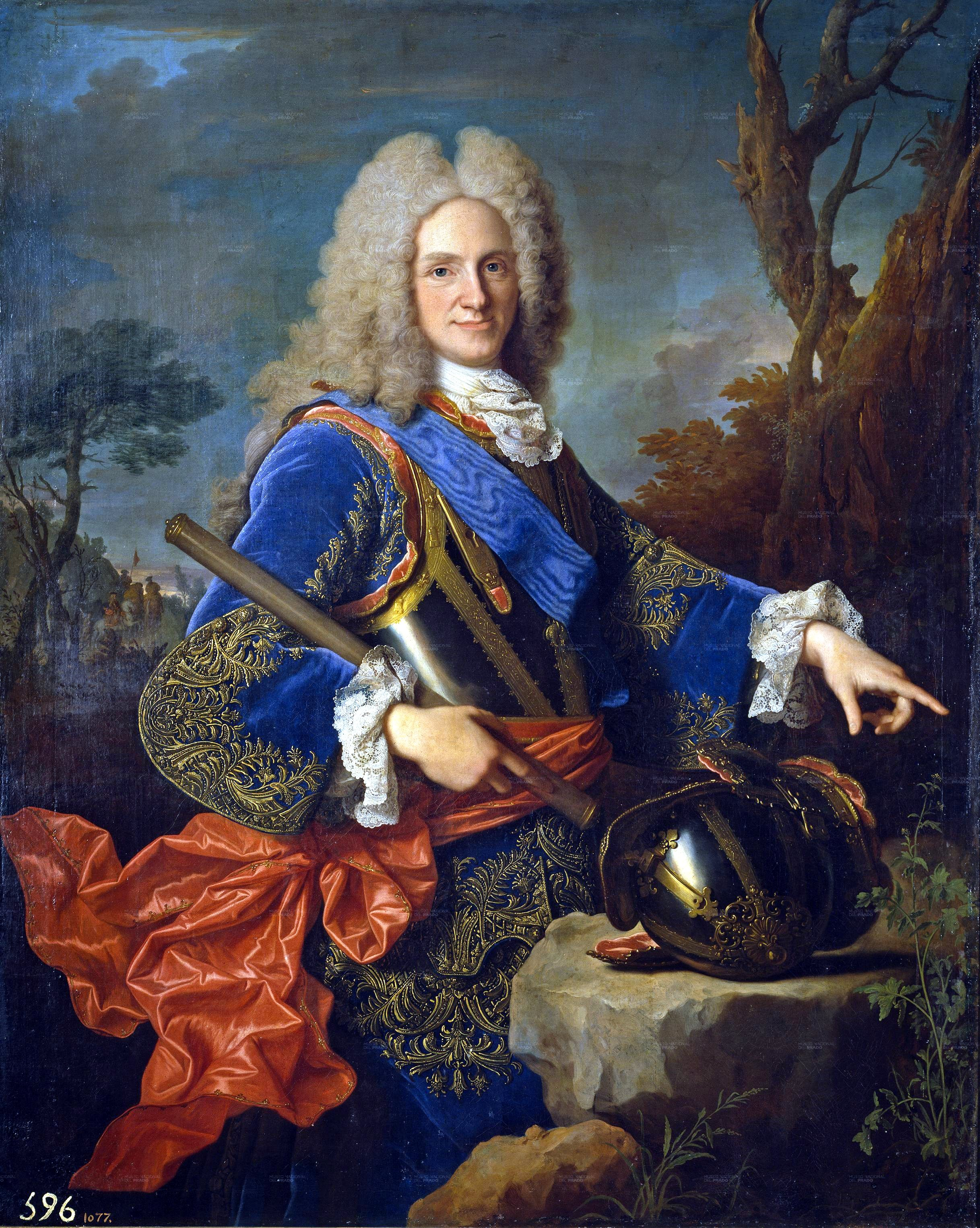
Philip V of Spain

- July 9 – King Philip V of Spain (b. 1683)
- July 28 – John Peter Zenger, American printer, whose court case advanced freedom of the press in the American colonies (b. 1697)
- July 30 – Francesco Trevisani, Italian painter (b. 1656)
- August 6 – Christian VI, King of Denmark and Norway (b. 1699)
- August 8 – Francis Hutcheson, Irish philosopher (b. 1694)
- September 25 – St George Gore-St George, Irish politician (b. 1722)
- October 2 – Josiah Burchett, English Secretary of the Admiralty (b. c. 1666)
- November 14 – Georg Steller, German naturalist (b. 1709)
- December 6 – Lady Grizel Baillie, Scottish poet (b. 1665)
- December 8 – Charles Radclyffe, British politician and rebel, by beheading after being convicted of treason against the Crown (b. 1693)

1747

- January 2 – Lord George Graham, Royal Navy officer and MP (b. 1715)
- January 16 – Barthold Heinrich Brockes, German poet (b. 1680)
- January 26 – Willem van Mieris, Dutch painter (b. 1662)
- March 2 – Margravine Sophie Charlotte of Brandenburg-Bayreuth, German noble (b. 1713)
- March 14 – Johann Matthias von der Schulenburg, German aristocrat and general (b. 1661)
- March 16 – Christian Augustus of Anhalt-Zerbst, father of Catherine the Great (b. 1690)
- March 23 – Claude Alexandre de Bonneval, French soldier (b. 1675)
- April 2 – Johann Jacob Dillenius, German botanist (b. 1684)
- April 3 – Francesco Solimena, Italian painter (b. 1657)
- April 7 – Leopold I, Prince of Anhalt-Dessau, Prussian field marshal (b. 1676)
- April 9 – Simon Fraser, 11th Lord Lovat, Scottish clan chief (b. c. 1667)
- April 14 – Jean-Frédéric Osterwald, Swiss Protestant pastor (b. 1663)
- May 9 – John Dalrymple, 2nd Earl of Stair, Scottish soldier and diplomat (b. 1673)
- May 28 – Luc de Clapiers, marquis de Vauvenargues, French writer (b. 1715)
- May 31 – Andrei Osterman, Russian statesman (b. 1686)
- June 8 – Alan Brodrick, 2nd Viscount Midleton, English cricketer (b. 1702)
- June 17 – Avdotya Chernysheva, Russian noble, lady in waiting (b. 1693)

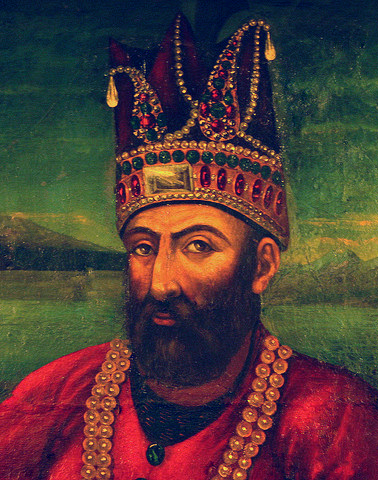
Nader Shah

- June 19
  - Nader Shah, Persian leader (b. 1688)
  - Alessandro Marcello, Italian composer (b. 1669)
- July 9 – Giovanni Bononcini, Italian composer (b. 1670)
- October 7 – Giulia Lama, Italian painter (b. 1681)
- October 9 – David Brainerd, American missionary (b. 1718)
- October 10 – John Potter, Archbishop of Canterbury (b. c. 1674)
- October 4 – Amaro Pargo, Spanish corsair (b. 1678)
- November 17 – Alain-René Lesage, French writer (b. 1668)
- December 2 – Vincent Bourne, English classical scholar (b. 1695)

1748

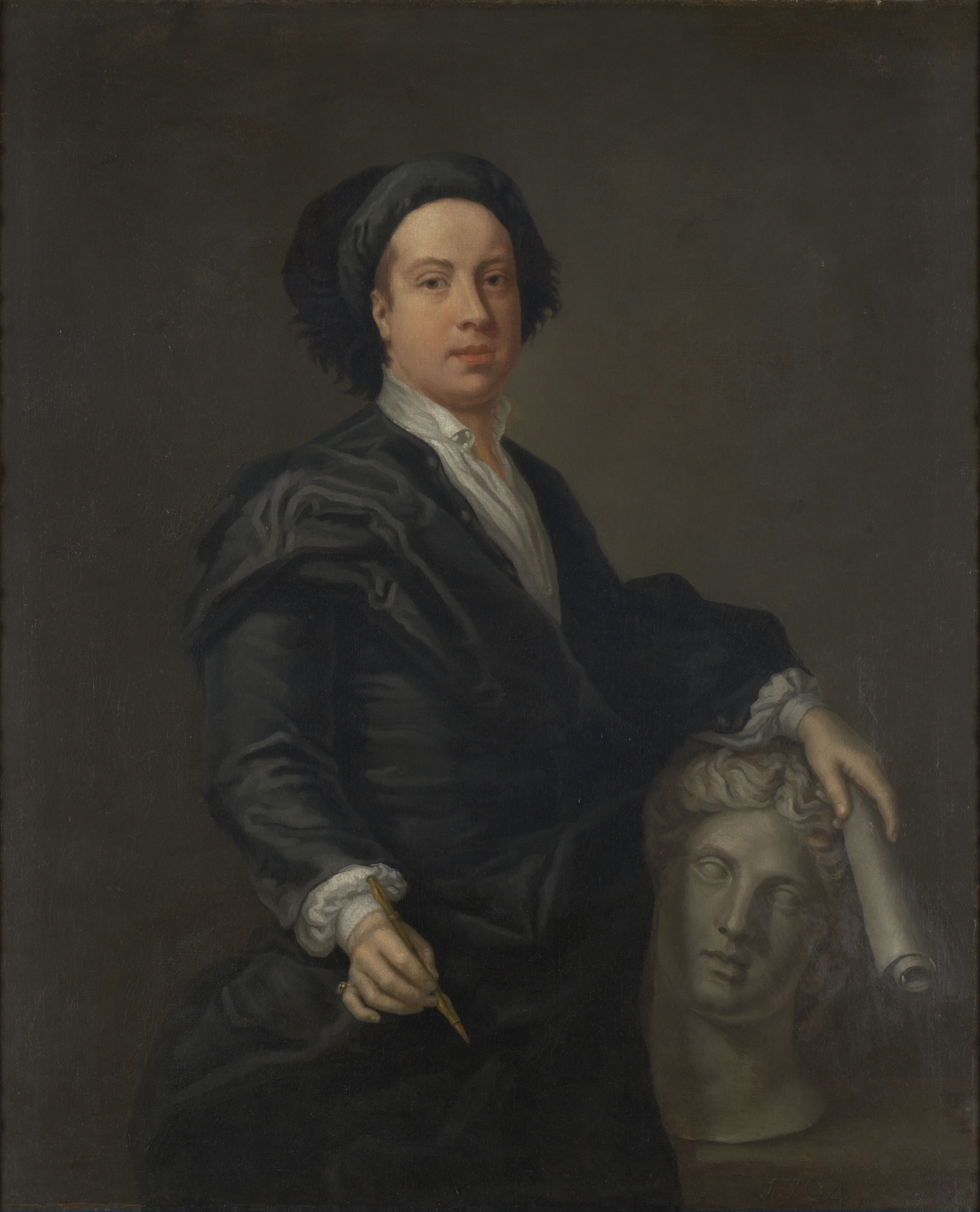
William Kent

- January 1 – Johann Bernoulli, Swiss mathematician (b. 1667)
- January 16 – Arnold Drakenborch, Dutch classical scholar (b. 1684)
- February 18 – Otto Ferdinand von Abensberg und Traun, Austrian field marshal (b. 1677)
- March 7 – Élisabeth Thérèse de Lorraine, French noblewoman, Princess of Epinoy by marriage (b. 1664)
- March 14 – George Wade, British military leader (b. 1673)
- March 23 – Johann Gottfried Walther, German music theorist, organist and composer (b. 1684)
- April 8 – Empress Xiaoxianchun of Qing dynasty (b. 1712)
- April 12 – William Kent, English architect (b. c. 1685)
- April 16 – Muhammad Shah, Mughal emperor of India (b. 1702)
- May 12 – Thomas Lowndes, British astronomer (b. 1692)
- May 17 – Henri, Duke of Elbeuf, member of the House of Lorraine (b. 1661)
- June 16 – Jean Philippe d'Orléans, illegitimate son of future French regent Philippe d'Orleans (b. 1702)
- June 28 – Marretje Arents, Dutch rebel leader (b. 1712)
- August 27 – James Thomson, Scottish poet (b. 1700)
- September 6 – Edmund Gibson, English jurist (b. 1669)
- September 10 – Mother Ignacia del Espíritu Santo, Filipino founder of the Congregation of the Religious of the Virgin Mary (b. 1663)
- September 12 – Anne Bracegirdle, English actress (b. c. 1671)
- September 21 – John Balguy, English philosopher (b. 1686)
- November 25 – Isaac Watts, English hymn writer (b. 1674)
- December 2 – Charles Seymour, 6th Duke of Somerset, English politician (b. 1662)

1749

- February 1 – Françoise Marie de Bourbon, youngest daughter of Louis XIV (b. 1677)
- February 8 – Jan van Huysum, Dutch painter (b. 1682)
- February 11 – Philip Livingston, American politician (b. 1686)
- April 14 – Balthasar Denner, German artist (b. 1685)
- May 11 – Catharine Trotter Cockburn, English novelist, dramatist, and philosopher (b. 1674)
- May 28 – Pierre Subleyras, French painter (b. 1699)
- June 18 – Ambrose Philips, English poet (b. 1675)
- July 1 – William Jones, Welsh mathematician (b. 1675)
- July 12
  - Charles de la Boische, Marquis de Beauharnois, Governor of New France (b. c.1671)
  - George Carpenter, 2nd Baron Carpenter of England (b. 1702)
- July 23 – Ingeborg i Mjärhult, Swedish soothsayer (b. 1665)
- August 13 – Johann Elias Schlegel, German critic, poet (b. 1719)
- August 29 – Matthias Bel, Hungarian pastor, polymath (b. 1684)

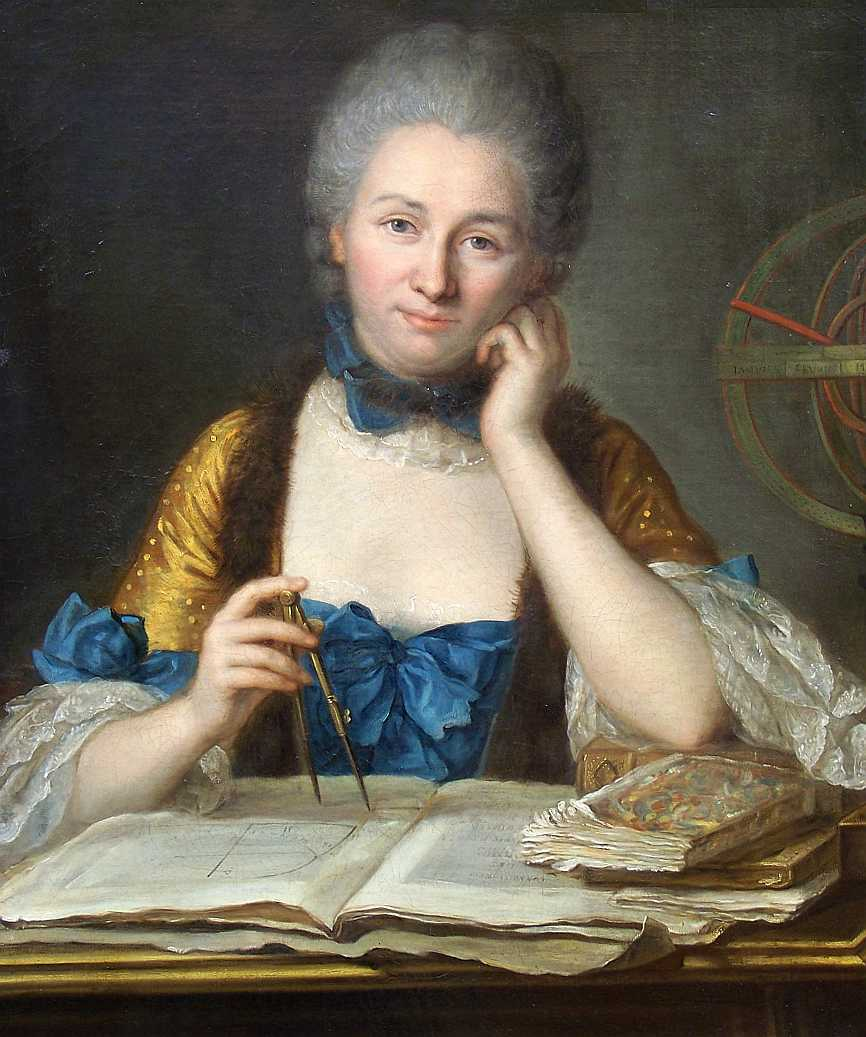
Émilie du Châtelet

- September 10 – Émilie du Châtelet, French mathematician, physicist (b. 1706)
- September 14 – Richard Temple, 1st Viscount Cobham, English soldier, politician (b. 1675)
- October 4 – Baron Franz von der Trenck, Austrian soldier (b. 1711)
- October 9 – Luís da Cunha, Ambassador of Portugal (b. 1662)
- November 14 – Maruyama Gondazaemon, Japanese sumo wrestler (b. 1713)
- November 19 – Carl Heinrich Biber, German violinist and composer (b. 1681)
- December 4 – Claudine Guérin de Tencin, French salon holder (b. 1682)
- December 5 – Pierre Gaultier de Varennes, sieur de La Vérendrye, French-Canadian explorer and trader (b. 1685)
- December 19 – Francesco Antonio Bonporti, Italian priest and composer (b. 1672)
- December 25 – John Lindsay, 20th Earl of Crawford, British Army general (b. 1702)
- date unknown – Maria Oriana Galli-Bibiena, Italian painter (b. 1656)
