= Zum Nordstern lodge in Riga =

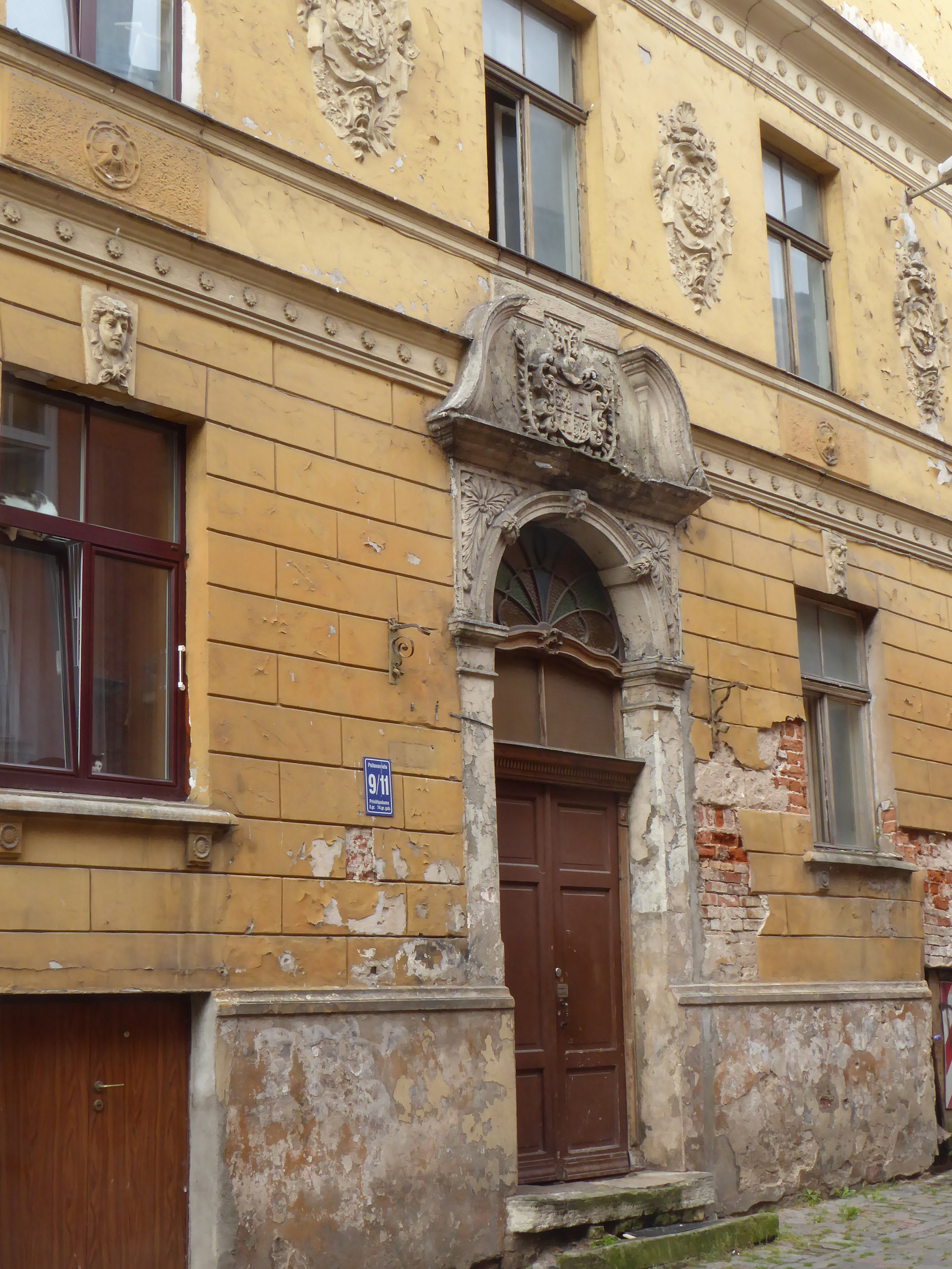
Peitavas iela 9/11, former Freemason lodge entry portal, Riga, Latvia

Zum Nordstern lodge in Riga (Zum Nordstern translated from German "North Star") was the first Freemason lodge in Riga, founded in 1750 by brothers Johann Zuckerbecker and Johann Dietrich von der Heyde from the St. Petersburg Lodge "Zur Verschwiegenheit" ("To Secrecy"). The lodge's name was derived from the Copenhagen Lodge "St. Martin zum Nordstern," as the first leader of the "Zur Verschwiegenheit" Lodge was a brother from this lodge, Johann Lotharius Friedrich von Maltzahn. The "Ziemeļzvaigzne" Lodge operated as part of the English Provincial Lodge until 1765, when its members established a new lodge called "At the Sword" within the Strict Observance system.

The Riga Lodge "Ziemeļzvaigzne" resumed its activities in the spring of 2002 under the Ancient, Free, and Accepted Masons (AF&AM) system, and on March 8, 2003, together with the Riga Lodges "Jāņuguns" and "At the Sword," it established the Grand Lodge of Latvia.

== History ==
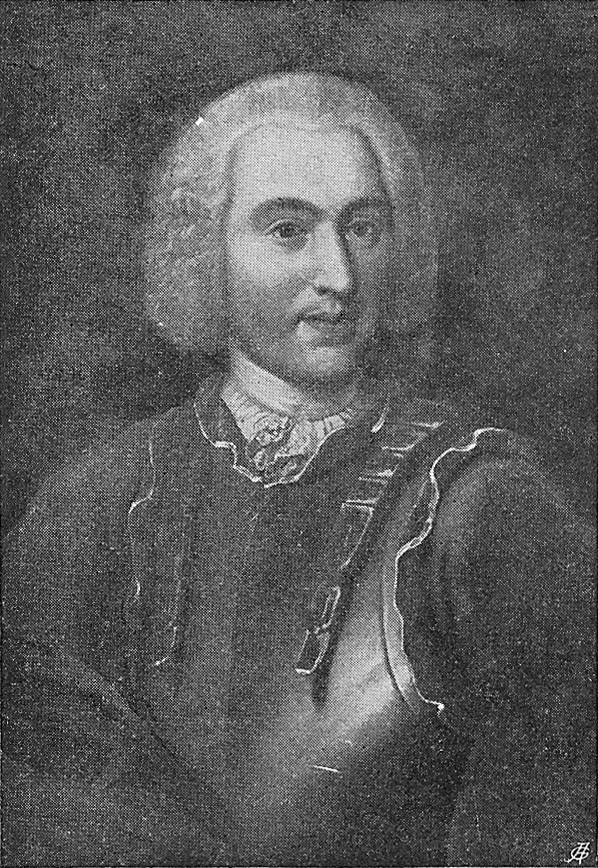
The founder of the lodge Johann Lothar von Maltzahn

=== London Provincial Lodge ===
The earliest authentic records of Freemasonry activities in the territory of modern-day Latvia can be found in the records of the London Grand Lodge on June 24, 1731:

Then the Grand Master [Lord Lovel of Minster Lovel, created Earl of Leicester, 1721] and his General Officers signed a Deputation for our Rt. Worshipful Brother John Phillips Esqr. to be Grand Master of free and accepted Masons within the Empires of Russia and Germany and Dominions and Territories thereunto belonging, and his health was drank wishing Prosperity to the Craft in those parts.

The second Grand Master from 1740 was the exiled Scottish nobleman James Francis Edward Keith (1696-1758), brother of the English Grand Master (1740) John Keith, Earl of Kintore. He was a supporter of the Stuart dynasty and backed the Jacobite uprising. From 1728, he served as a general in the Russian army, participated in the Russian war against Sweden (1741-1743), carried out diplomatic missions in Sweden (1743-1744), and later commanded Russian forces in Tallinn and Riga (1745-1747).

=== Founding of the Lodge ===
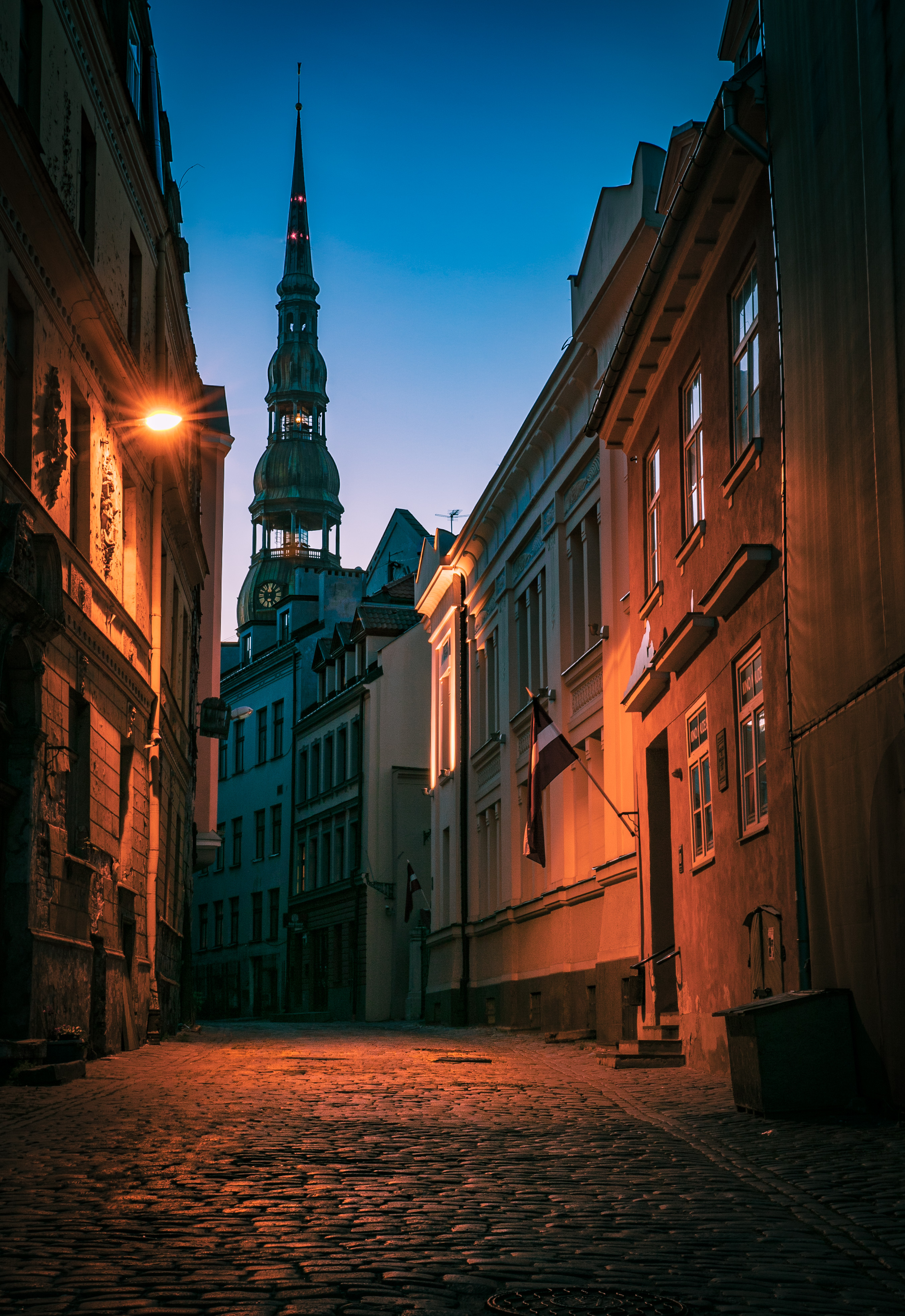
Zuckerbecker's house and former Zum Nordstern lodge at Peitava Street 9/11 on the left

The oldest lodge in Latvia, "Zum Nordstern," was founded in Riga in September 1750 by merchants of the Riga Merchant Guild, who still remembered the traditions of the Hanseatic League. The idea for the lodge's establishment may have come from the Grand Master of the Russian Provincial Lodge, General James Keith, who had stayed in Riga until 1747. The first leaders of the lodge were prominent Riga citizens Johann Dietrich von der Heyde (led the lodge from 1750 to 1760) and Johann Zuckerbecker (led the lodge from 1760 to 1765), who had been initiated into the "Zur Verschwiegenheit" Lodge in St. Petersburg by Baron Johann Lotharius von Maltzahn. The lodge apparently operated in three degrees according to the German translation of the Free and Accepted Masons' ritual established by the Hamburg Provincial Lodge under the English Grand Lodge. The lodge's name clearly refers to the North Star, a guiding star familiar to all sailors of the time. It is possible that the lodge's meetings were held in Zuckerbecker's house at Peitava Street 9/11.

=== Activities ===
"The spirit came from Denmark through St. Petersburg to us in Livonia: in April 1750, Riga merchants Johann Dietrich von der Heyde and Johann Zuckerbecker were initiated into the lodge of the same name founded in St. Petersburg by Baron Maltzahn—the Danish minister at the Russian Imperial Court and a member of the flourishing North Star Lodge in Copenhagen. Immediately after returning from St. Petersburg to Riga, Brother von der Heyde established the first lodge here, which was given the name North Star, and it began its activities in September 1750."

The first overseer of the lodge was Jean de Labadie, and the second was Vietinghoff, also known as "Kurländer," as noted in parentheses after his name in the lodge's "Brief History." Members of the first Riga Lodge wore a black feather on their hats as their only distinguishing mark. The lodge's activities were hindered by the Seven Years' War (1756-1763), during which the Russian Empire fought against the alliance of Great Britain, Prussia, and their allied German states.

=== Lodge members ===
Not all the names of the brothers of the "Ziemeļzvaigzne" Lodge are available in the archives, as the authorities did not require the submission of lodge membership lists during its operation. It can be assumed that residents of the Riga Governorate listed in the St. Petersburg Lodge "Zur Verschwiegenheit" (for example, Major General Wilhelm Georg von Fermor) were active in the Riga Lodge "Ziemeļzvaigzne." Similarly, older members of the "At the Sword" Lodge had been members of "Ziemeļzvaigzne" before its transition to the Strict Observance system, as well as brothers from foreign lodges, such as Johann Gotthelf Lindner, rector of the Riga Cathedral School.

==== Chair masters ====
- Johann Dietrich von der Heyde (von der Heyde / van der Heyde): Merchant. A brother of the St. Petersburg Lodge "Zur Verschwiegenheit" (1750), initiated into the lodge by the Danish envoy to the Russian Empire and the lodge's first chair master, Baron Johann Lotharius von Maltzahn, a brother of the Copenhagen Lodge "Zorobabel zum Nordstern" (until 1750). Founder and first chair master of the Riga Lodge "Zum Nordstern" (1750-1760).
- Johann Zuckerbecker (1727-1775): Merchant, shipowner. A brother of the St. Petersburg Lodge "Zur Verschwiegenheit" (1750). Founder of the Riga Lodge "Zum Nordstern" (1750) and chair master (1760-1765). At his invitation, Johann Gottfried Herder joined the "At the Sword" Lodge in 1766.

==== Overseers ====
- Jean de Labadie (1719-1812): First overseer of the lodge. From 1751, a colonel in the Russian army; from 1781, a colonel in the Prussian army; from 1793, a brigadier general in the French army.
- Otto Hermann von Vietinghoff-Scheel (1722-1792): Known as "Kurländer." A Livonian politician and patron, founder of Riga's first permanent theater, and during Catherine II's reign, the Director-General of the Medical College of the Russian Empire in St. Petersburg. Second overseer.

==== Founder of the Lodge ====
- Johann Lothar Friedrich von Maltzahn (1719-1756): Danish diplomat in Russia. A member of the Copenhagen Lodge "Zorobabel zum Nordstern." Founder and first chair master of the first St. Petersburg Lodge "Zur Verschwiegenheit" ("To Secrecy") (1750).
