= Freemasonry in Latvia =

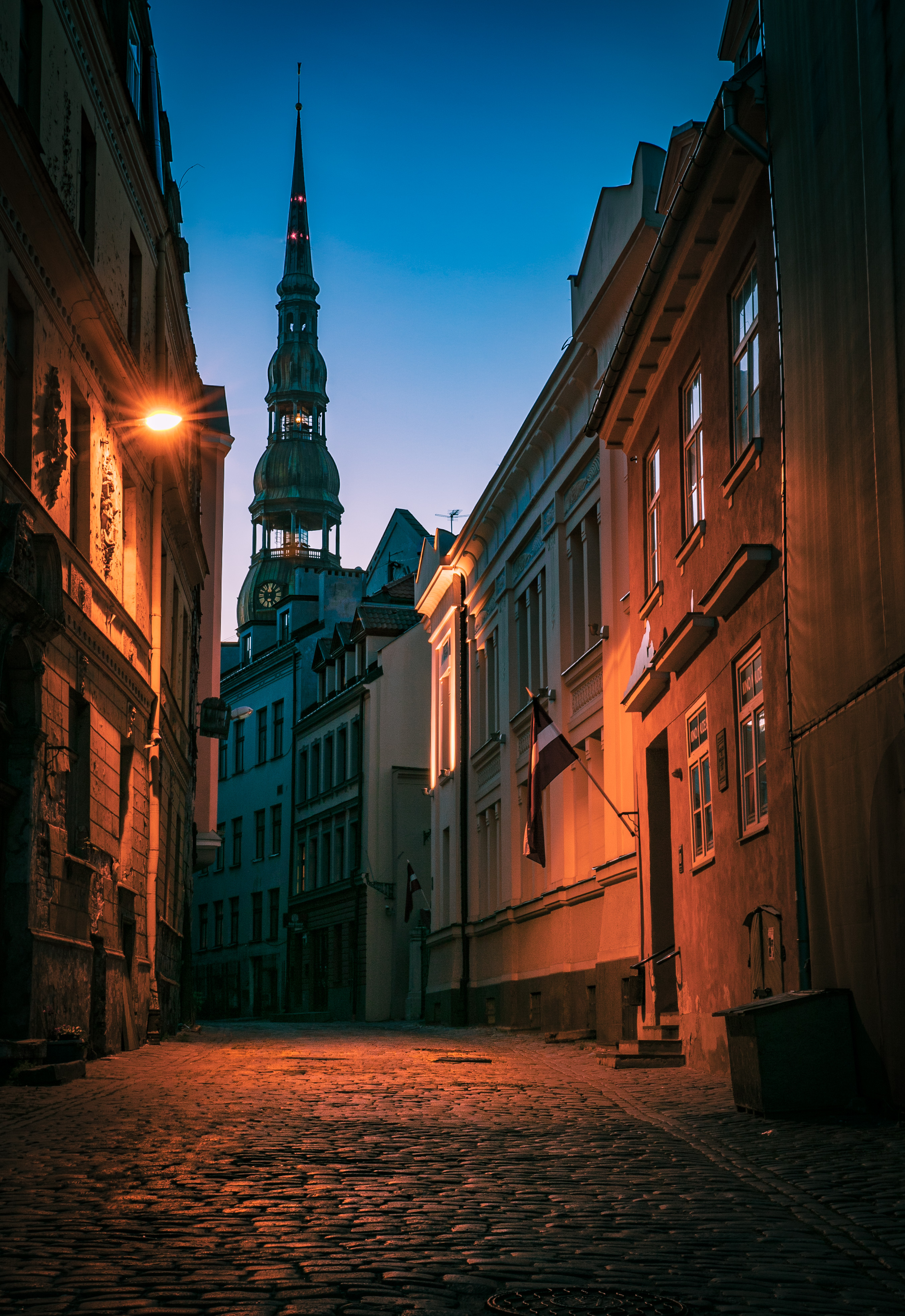
Alleyway of Peitavas street in Riga with the lodge entry portal on the left

Freemasonry in Latvia has a history dating back to the mid-18th century, marked by periods of growth, suppression, and revival.

== History and origins ==
In the 18th century, the territory now known as Latvia was divided into three distinct regions:

1. Livonia (modern-day Vidzeme)
2. Polish Livonia (Latgale)
3. Courland and Semigallia (Kurzeme un Zemgale)

Under these circumstances, Latvian Masonic lodges became arenas for competition among English, German, Swedish, and Russian Masonic systems. Riga and Jelgava emerged as centers of international importance for the Masonic movement.

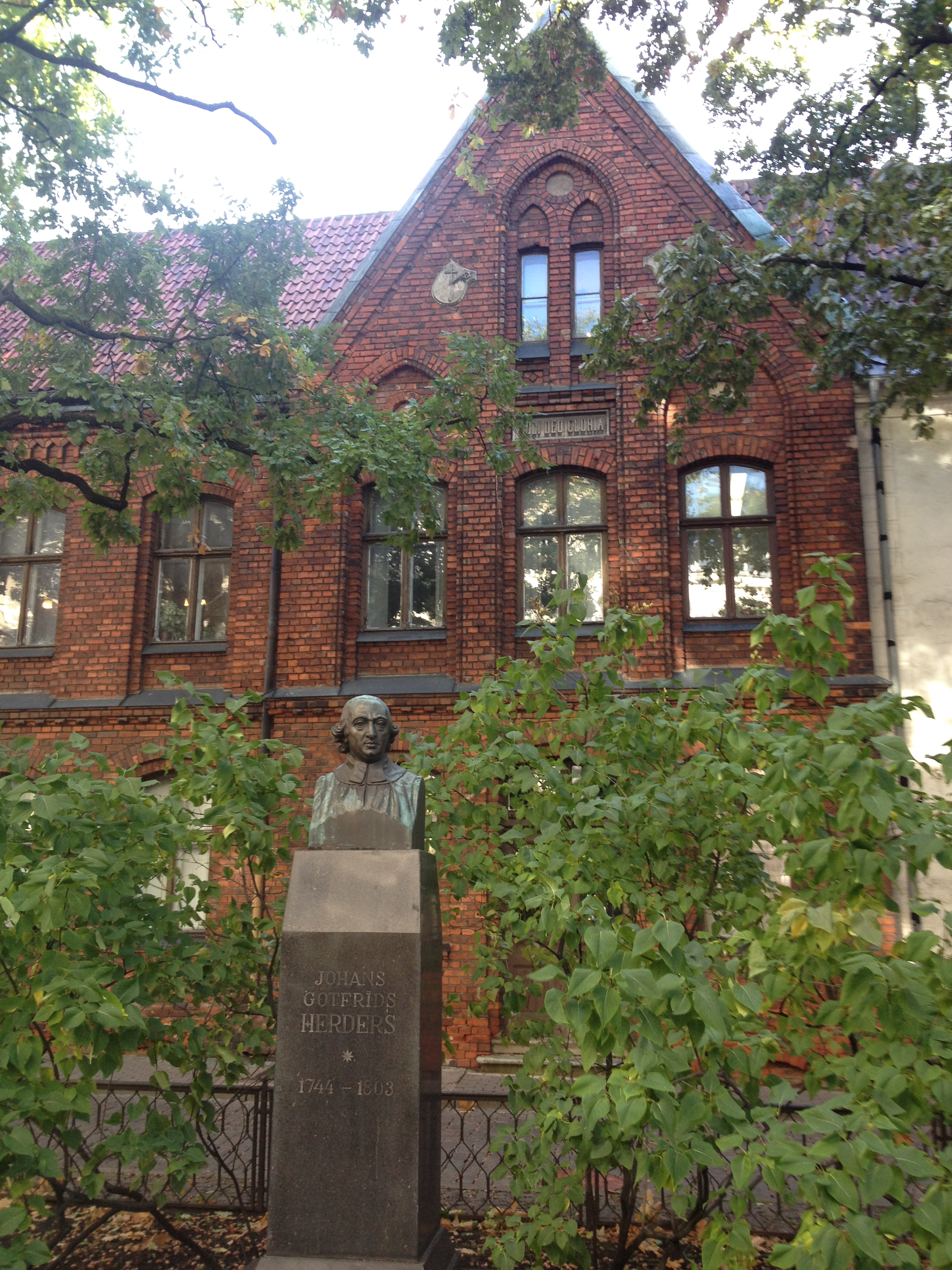
Bust of Johann Gottfried Herder in Herder Square, Riga

The introduction of Freemasonry to Latvia occurred in 1750 with the establishment of the first lodge in Riga, known as Zum Nordstern (Northern Star/Ziemeļzvaigzne). This lodge was founded by merchants Johann Zuckerbecker and Johann Dietrich von der Heyde, who had been initiated into Freemasonry in St. Petersburg. The lodge conducted its meetings at Zuckerbecker's residence, located at 9/11 Peitavas Street in Riga. This building holds historical significance as the original meeting place of Latvian Freemasonry.

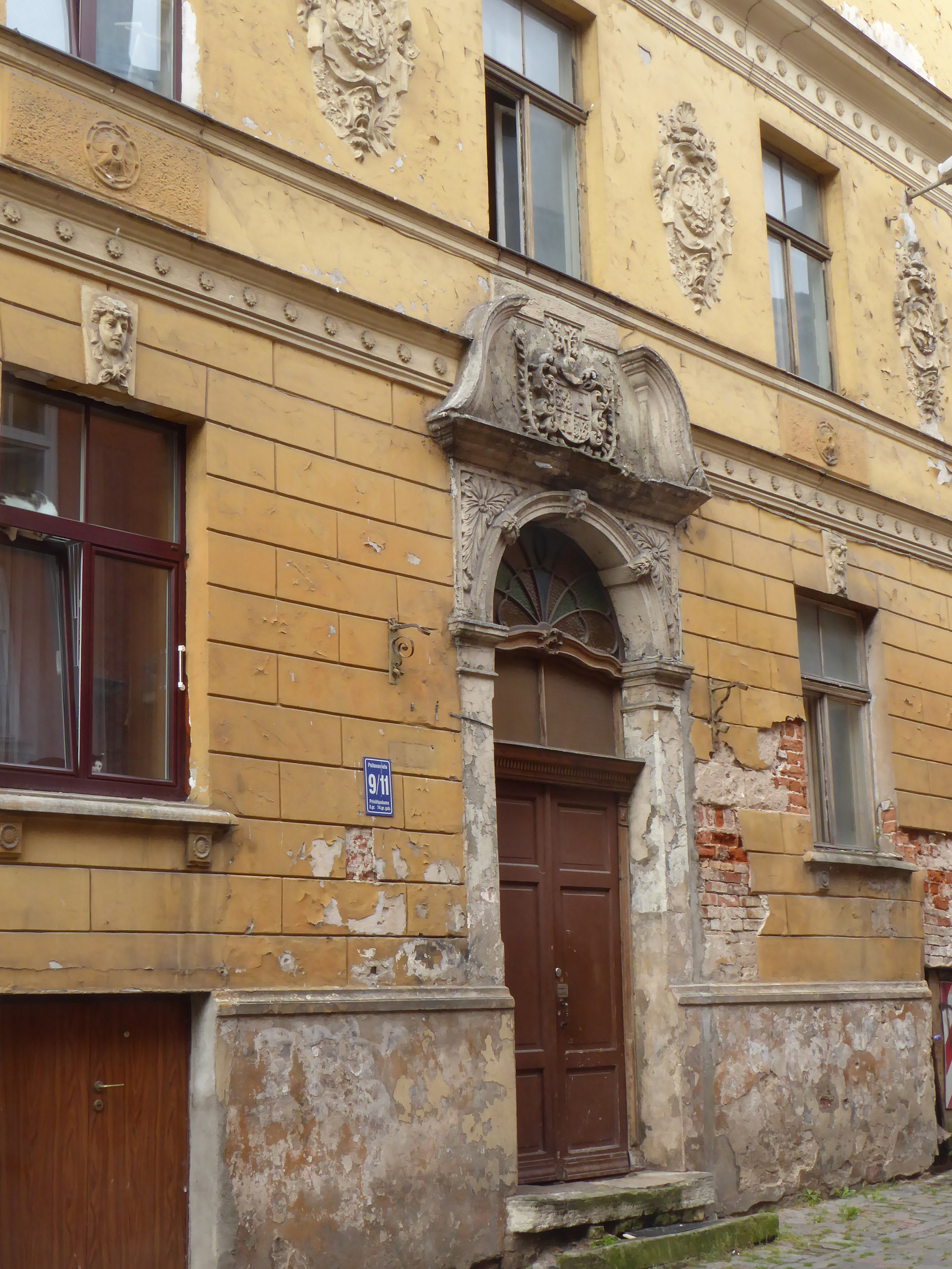
Façade of the lodge of 9/11 Peitavas Street

The early Latvian lodges primarily comprised the German intellectual elite, including aristocrats, diplomats, merchants, and professionals from various fields. Notably, the esteemed German theologian Johann Gottfried Herder was admitted to the Zum Schwert ("At the Sword") lodge in Riga in June 1766. During his time in Livonia, Herder aspired to reform what he described as a province characterized by "barbarity and luxury, ignorance and exclusive taste, freedom and slavery," aiming to promote "culture and liberty." His experiences in Latvia influenced his later works, including the collection of folk songs, "Stimmen der Völker in Liedern" (1788–1789), which featured Latvian folk lyrics.

Throughout the 1770s, Latvian Freemasonry was further shaped by influential figures. Ivan Yelagin—recognized as the first Russian Grand Master in Freemasonry—worked to unite lodges across the Russian Empire, ensuring the resilience of the craft in the region. In 1777, lodges such as “Apollo” and “Castor” in Riga received consecration under the auspices of the Grand Lodge of Berlin. Meanwhile, different lodges aligned with distinct traditions: “Konstantin zum gekrönten Adler” was affiliated with the Russian Land Lodge in Moscow, while “Zur kleinen Welt”—later transformed in 1809 into the “Euphonie” Choir—followed the Swedish system. The English influence was also significant; for example, the “Astraea” Lodge was established in 1787 in Riga by the English Provincial Grand Lodge in Petersburg.

In Mitau (now Jelgava), Masonic activity took on a distinctive flavor. As early as 1754, two lodges operated under names reflecting French Masonic nomenclature—“Trois Couers couronnés” (Three Crowned Hearts) and “Trois Epées couronnées” (Three Crowned Swords), the latter of which later survived under the German name “Zu den drei gekrönten Schwerten.” The city also became a stage for personalities Johann August von Starck, later dubbed “the father of the comparative history of religions,” began teaching philosophy at the newly founded Academia Petrina in Mitau in 1777. His contributions, alongside those of Karl Gotthelf von Hund and Jean-Baptiste Willermoz, contributed shape rites and rituals that continue in modern Freemasonry.

During his stay in Jelgava in 1779 and 1780, Alessandro Cagliostro contended with Starck for Masonic influence. Immersed in mystical pursuits, Cagliostro sought to establish an Egyptian Rite of Freemasonry, incorporating magical practices into the foundational degrees of the fraternity.

Throughout the 18th century, Freemasonry in Latvia expanded, establishing several lodges across the region. Political upheavals and changing regimes led to periods of suppression, particularly during authoritarian rule.

=== 20th century ===
Liepāja (historically Libau) also played its part. In 1780, Provincial Grandmaster Ivan Yelagin established a lodge on behalf of the English Provincial Lodge of Russia, registering it with the Grand Lodge of England. Almost a century later, the Military Lodge “Anker und Schwert” (Anchor and Sword) was founded in Libau on 28 October 1916. Converted in 1919 by the Grand Lodge of Prussia “Zur Freundschaft” into a St. John Peace Lodge, it was briefly dissolved in April 1921 before being reconstituted on the same day as the first independent Latvian St. John Lodge, “Enkurs” (Anchor).

The interwar period saw the birth of explicitly national lodges. In 1924, a second lodge named “Jāņuguns” was established in Riga—a name chosen not only for its dedication to the Patron Saint of John Lodges but also for its cultural resonance with the Latvian celebration of St. John's Festival and its iconic bonfires (Jāņuguns). Initially part of the Grand Land Lodge of Freemasons of Germany, “Jāņuguns” gained recognition as a regular, independent lodge by 1926 from several Grand Lodges across Germany, Norway, Sweden, and even New York. In that same year, representatives of the lodge were received in Riga Castle by King Gustaf V of Sweden. However, both Latvian lodges were forced to close prior to the Soviet occupation in 1940—and again during Nazi control in 1941—with all Masonic activities later banned under Communist rule.

=== Revival ===
Following Latvia's independence in 1991, Freemasonry experienced a gradual revival. The first brethren were admitted in 1993, and the pre-war lodge "Jāņuguns" (Johannisfeuer) was reactivated in 1996 as a regular lodge under the auspices of the Grand Lodge of Ancient Free & Accepted Masons of Germany. Subsequently, additional lodges, including "Ziemeļzvaigzne" (Zum Nordstern) and "Pie Zobena" (Zum Schwert), were reestablished.

Despite some ritual controversies among the German Grand Lodges, the United Grand Lodges of Germany consecrated the multi-ritual Grand Lodge of Latvia in 2003.

== Influence ==
Freemasonry significantly shaped Enlightenment-era Latvia by mobilizing progressive intellectuals and spearheading cultural and philanthropic initiatives. Prominent figures like Johann Gottfried Herder were active in the Masonic movement—Herder championed the collection of Latvian folk songs and critiqued the historical oppression of Latvian peasants by 13th-century German crusaders.

Masonic lodges played a role in founding key cultural institutions. Otto Hermann von Vietinghoff-Scheel, the overseer of Zum Nordstern, was crucial in establishing Riga’s first permanent theater, the House of Muses (Rigaer Stadttheater), in 1782. In addition, these circles influenced the creation of Riga’s inaugural public library, museum, and early printing houses that disseminated Enlightenment ideas.

A notable example of this intellectual ferment was the Berens Circle in Riga. Spearheaded by figures such as Johann Christoph Berens—the city archive curator—this group of historians, educators, and publishers, including Johann Gotthelf Lindner, Gottlieb Schlegel, Johann Christoph Schwartz, and publisher Johann Friedrich Hartknoch, reinterpreted Riga’s medieval past. They challenged the narrative of Catholic theocracy by blaming it for the 13th-century violence against locals and celebrated early resistors like Caupo of Turaida and Henry of Latvia.

The influence of Freemasonry extended into literature and the arts. Gotthard Friedrich Stender, a foundational figure in secular Latvian literature, maintained close ties with Masonic circles through his extensive travels to Braunschweig and Copenhagen, and his influential works (including the treatise Wahrheit der Religion, published in Russian by Freemason Nikolay Novikov, and his alchemical manuscripts) underscore his immersion in Masonic intellectual currents and associations, despite the lack of direct documentation regarding his initiation. In contrast, the radical Garlieb Merkel embodied a more confrontational spirit; his evolution from revolutionary activism to support for the Russian Empire, while consistently sympathizing with the oppressed, reflected the broader debates on social reform and national identity in Riga’s enlightened circles.

Philanthropy was another major aspect of the Masonic agenda. Freemasons established schools for orphans and impoverished youth in Riga and Pierīga, advocating for the broader education of the peasantry. Even after Catherine II imposed restrictions on secret societies in 1794, former lodge members continued their cultural work. For example, in 1797, members of the Riga lodge "Zur kleinen Welt Brüder" founded the singing society Euphonie, whose ritualistic communal singing later influenced both the Baltic German choral tradition and the modern Latvian Song Festival.

Former Freemasons were also instrumental in founding several organizations that laid the intellectual groundwork for the First Latvian National Awakening. These include the Riga Literary Practical Civic Association (Literärisch-Praktische Bürgerverbindung) established 1802, the Vidzeme General and Economic Society (1792), the Courland Society for Literature and Art (Kurländische Gesellschaft für Literatur und Kunst) (1817), and the Latvian Literary Society (1824). Collectively, these efforts challenged traditional hierarchies and promoted the dissemination of Latvian literature and cultural ideas, setting the stage for a renewed sense of national identity.
