= Maltzahn =

Original Coat of Arms of the Maltza(h)n family

The Maltzahn family or Maltzan is an ancient and influential German noble family of counts and barons, originating in Mecklenburg and Western Pomerania.

== History ==
The Maltza(h)n family originated in Mecklenburg, Germany, and were first mentioned in a written document from 1194 with Bernhardus de Mulsan as arbitrator in Isfried von Ratzeburg's partition treaty. Members of the family were at first vassals of the Bishops of Ratzeburg.

Throughout centuries they occupied many important positions within the Duchy of Mecklenburg and in its successor states, in the Kingdom of Prussia and later in the German Empire.

The family owned large properties in Mecklenburg, expropriated by communist East Germany in 1945, where they are now once again based on several estates that they have reacquired.

== Notable members ==
- Maria von Maltzan (1909–1997), German Resistance member
- Christian von Maltzahn (1956–1997), co-founder of Bruno Gmünder Verlag
- Geoffrey von Maltzahn (born 1980), American biological engineer
- Günther Freiherr von Maltzahn (1910–1953), German World War II flying ace
- Heinrich von Maltzan, Baron zu Wartenburg und Penzlin (1826–1874), German traveller
- Helmuth von Maltzahn (1840–1923), German finance minister and politician
- Hermann von Maltzan (1843–1891), German malacologist
- Joseph von Maltzahn (born 1978), British rower
- Kathleen Maltzahn (born 1966), Australian author and political activist
- Michael Maltzan, American architect
- Mortimer von Maltzan (1793–1843), Prussian diplomat and foreign minister
- Ronja Maltzahn (1993–), German singer and multi instrumentalist.
- Sophie von Maltzan, German-Irish landscape architect
- Vollrath von Maltzan (1899–1967), West German ambassador to France
- Johann Lotharius Friedrich von Maltzahn (1719–1756), Danish diplomat of German origin
