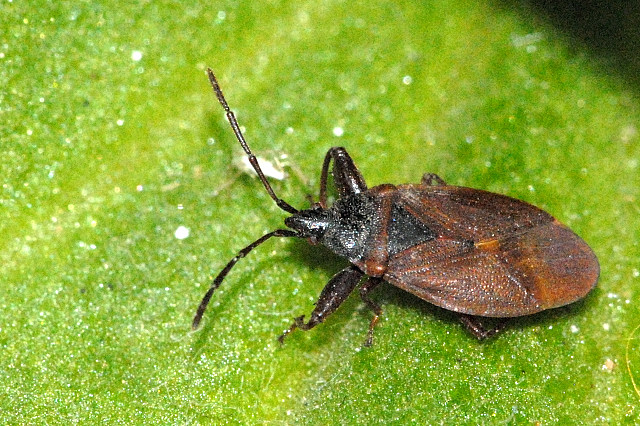

Scientific classification
- Domain: Eukaryota
- Kingdom: Animalia
- Phylum: Arthropoda
- Class: Insecta
- Order: Hemiptera
- Suborder: Heteroptera
- Family: Rhyparochromidae
- Genus: Gastrodes
- Species: G. grossipes

Binomial name
- Gastrodes grossipes (De Geer, 1773)

= Gastrodes grossipes =

Species of true bug

Gastrodes grossipes, the pine cone bug, is a true bug found in most of Europe except in the far north. To the east, the distribution area extends over Asia minor and the Caucasus, and then across the Palearctic to Siberia. The food plant is Scots pine.
