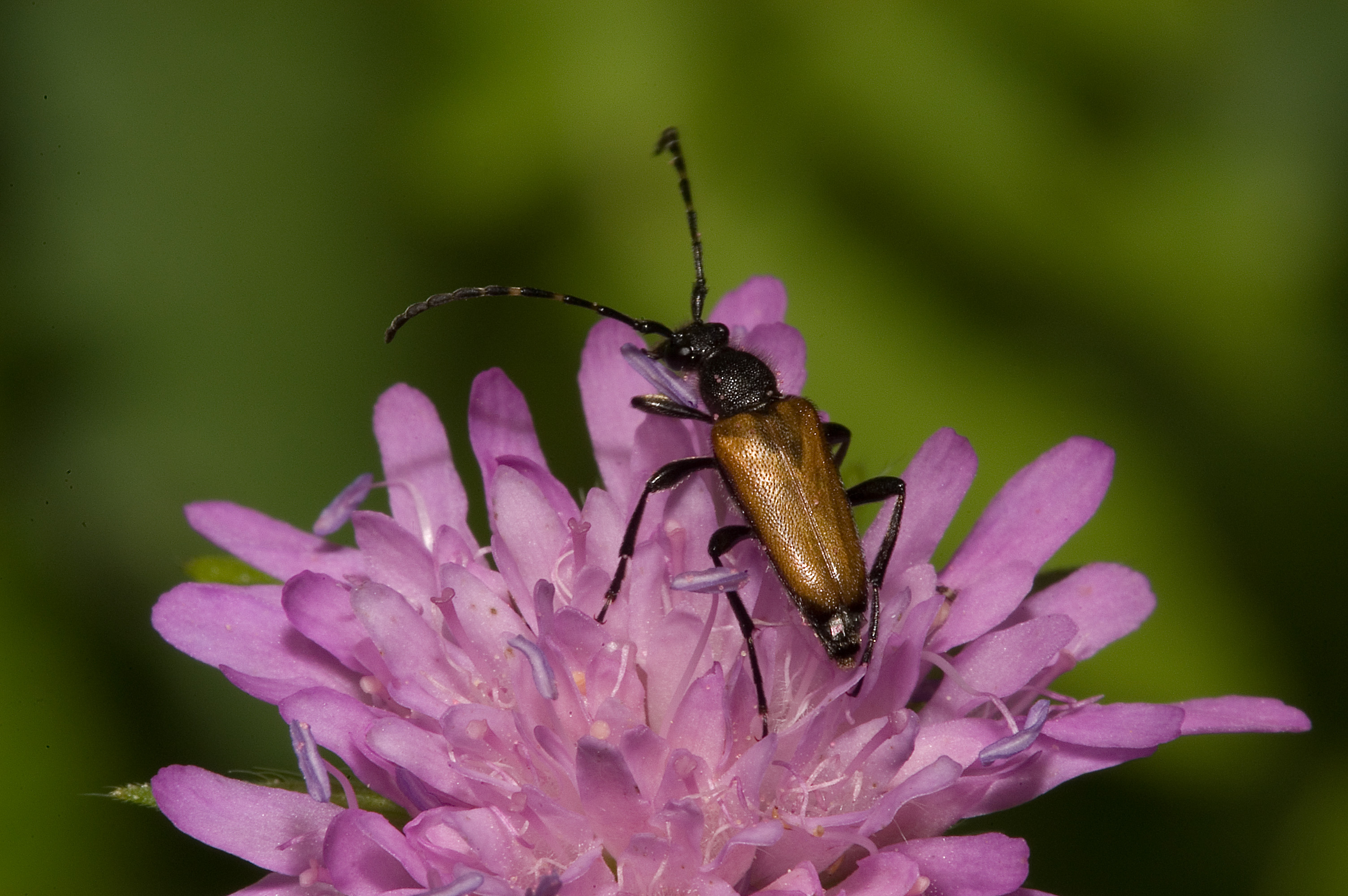

Scientific classification
- Domain: Eukaryota
- Kingdom: Animalia
- Phylum: Arthropoda
- Class: Insecta
- Order: Coleoptera
- Suborder: Polyphaga
- Infraorder: Cucujiformia
- Family: Cerambycidae
- Genus: Paracorymbia
- Species: P. maculicornis

Binomial name
- Paracorymbia maculicornis De Geer, 1775

Synonyms
- Leptura maculicornis De Geer, 1775

= Paracorymbia maculicornis =

Species of beetle

Paracorymbia maculicornis is a species of longhorn beetle in Lepturinae subfamily. It was described by Charles De Geer in 1775 and is found in central and northern Europe. The species are 7–10 millimetres (0.28–0.39 in) long, and are black coloured with orange wings. Their flight time is from May to August, with a life cycle of 2 years. They eat polyphagous, coniferous and deciduous trees, the species of which are birches, firs, spruce, and pines.
