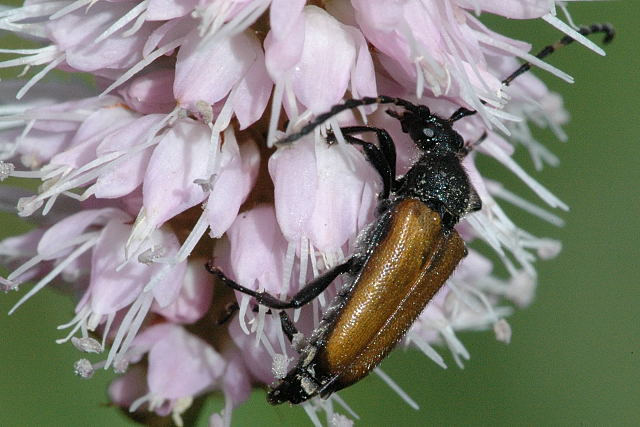
- Paracorymbia fulva

Scientific classification
- Kingdom: Animalia
- Phylum: Arthropoda
- Class: Insecta
- Order: Coleoptera
- Suborder: Polyphaga
- Infraorder: Cucujiformia
- Family: Cerambycidae
- Subfamily: Lepturinae
- Tribe: Lepturini
- Genus: Paracorymbia; Miroshnikov, 1998

= Paracorymbia =

Genus of beetles

Paracorymbia is a genus of beetles belonging to the family Cerambycidae.

== Species ==
The following species are recognised in the genus Paracorymbia:

- Paracorymbia fulva (Degeer, 1775)
- Paracorymbia hybrida (Rey, 1885)
- Paracorymbia maculicornis (Degeer, 1775)
- Paracorymbia otini (Peyerimhoff, 1949)
- Paracorymbia sambucicola (Holzschuh, 1982)
- Paracorymbia simplonica (Fairmaire, 1885)
- Paracorymbia stragulata (Germar, 1824)
