= Johann August von Starck =

German pastor and author

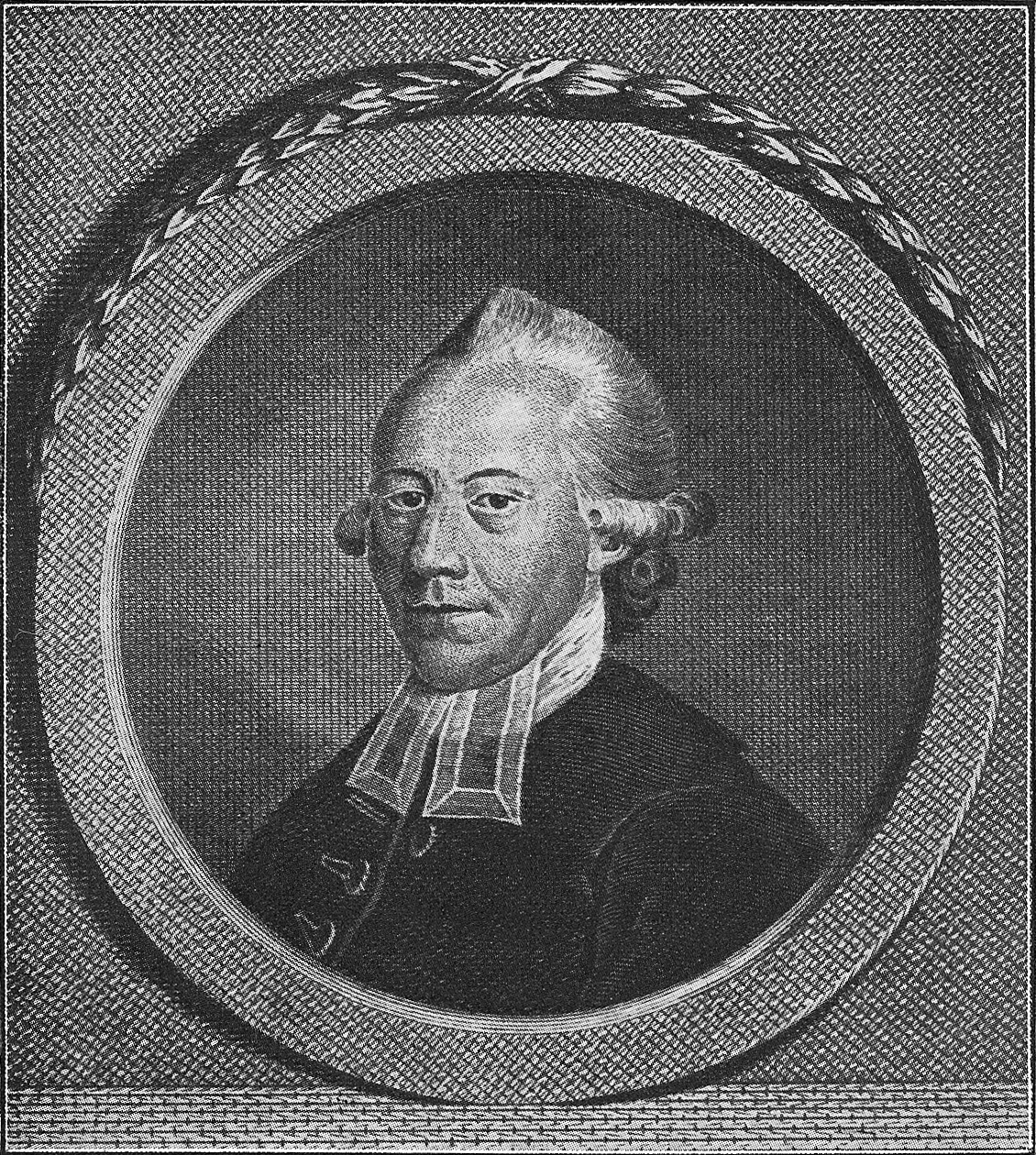
Johann August von Starck.

Johann August Starck also Stark (28 October 1741 – 3 March 3, 1816) was a prolific author and controversial Königsberg theologian, as well as a widely read political writer now best remembered for arguing that an Illuminati-led conspiracy brought about the French Revolution. Immanuel Kant and Johann Georg Hamann were among his acquaintances in Königsberg. His broadly deistic approach emphasized natural religion and smoothed over doctrinal differences among the various faiths.

== Biography ==
- Johann August Starck was born in Schwerin (Mecklenburg) on 28 October 1741, the son of a Lutheran pastor.
- Starck began his studies in theology and oriental languages at Göttingen in 1761 under Johann David Michaelis (1717–1791), with whom he later broke.
- In that same year he was initiated into a French freemasonry lodge at Göttingen and soon became an enthusiastic and evangelizing convert.
- He also made the acquaintance of Anton Friedrich Büsching (1724–93), who taught at the university in Göttingen but left for St. Petersburg in 1761 to pastor the Lutheran congregation there and to direct the famous Petrina Academy, and in 1763 he offered Starck a post teaching Roman antiquity and Near Eastern (‘oriental’) languages.
- While teaching in St. Petersburg, Starck had met a Greek by the name of Count Peter Melesino (or ‘Melissino’; 1726–1797), a lieutenant-general in the Russian Imperial Army, and whose order of freemasonry claimed the clerics of the Templar Knights as its ancestors, and through whom the secret wisdom of the ancient Egyptians and Jews was claimed to have been preserved.
- Starck filled this post for the next two years, all the while furthering his contacts in the world of freemasonry, and then traveled to Paris in 1765 and obtained a position at the royal library working with ancient Near Eastern manuscripts.
- Starck was awarded his magister degree from Göttingen in absentia on 28 August 1766, but his father's illness soon brought him back to Germany, where he assumed a position as assistant rector at the gymnasium in Wismar (1766-8).
- Starck promoted the clerical brand of Templarism and in 1768 joined it to movement of Karl Gotthelf von Hund (1722–1776), a union formalized in 1772. During this time he helped found a Strict Observance lodge at Wismar (February 1767) while teaching at the local gymnasium,
- Starck returned to St. Petersburg in 1768, presumably on freemasonry business, before arriving in Königsberg on 28 September 1769 where he lived next door to Immanuel Kant (1724–1804) — both were renting rooms from the book dealer Kanter, although Starck appears to have enjoyed free lodging.
- Starck began teaching in the philosophy faculty as an associate professor of Near Eastern languages with the summer semester of 1770, the same semester Kant began his tenure as full professor of logic and metaphysics. Starck was also appointed as second court chaplain at this time.
- After moving to Königsberg he founded a second Clerical chapter (1770).
- In 1773 he received a doctorate in theology from Königsberg, legitimizing his appointment as 4th full professor of theology in 1772.
- He gave up his philosophy appointment in the fall of 1773, and the following April married Maria Albertine Schultz, the youngest daughter of the late Franz Albert Schultz (1692–1763), a prominent pietist leader and professor of theology at Königsberg.
- In 1776 Starck became the senior court chaplain at Königsberg, as well as third full professor of theology and the general superintendent of the East Prussian schools.
- Johann Georg Hamann (1730–88) was a strident critic of Starck's and much of the theology faculty and local clergy opposed him, especially G. C. Pisanski (1725–90), G. C. Reccard (1735–98), F. S. Bock (1716–85), and Kant's close acquaintance and biographer L. E. Borowski (1740–1831).
- Starck's publication of Hephästion (1775), which traced certain features of Christianity back to pagan roots, precipitated a strong reaction among clerics and the academic community, including a rebuttal by Pisanski (Antihephästion, 1776).
- His broadly deistic approach emphasized natural religion and smoothed over doctrinal differences among the various faiths, such as in his anonymous Defense of Freemasonry (1770), that argued the wisdom found in the Eleusinian mystery religion, freemasonry, and Christianity were essentially all of a piece.
- Personal disagreements and conflict with the local Prussian Consistory at Königsberg, as well as overwork, eventually led Starck to resign his various positions in March 1777, leaving Prussia to teach philosophy at the gymnasium of Mitau - the capital of Courland and a center of freemasonry at the time. During this time he published a three-volume History of the Christian Church (1779–80) as well as an anonymous Honest Thoughts about Christianity (1780) that marked a conservative turn in his theology.
- A shift towards the reactionary, first evident in Starck's 1780 anonymous Honest Thoughts about Christianity, was complete in his widely read Triumph of Philosophy (1803) — a work partly inspired by Abbé Barruel’s attack on freemasonry (1797) — wherein he claimed that the Illuminati, a freemasonry group founded by Adam Weishaupt (1748–1830) in 1776, stood behind the French revolution and were secretly pursuing similar lawless and godless schemes in German lands and elsewhere.
- The Prussian Crown Prince, later Friedrich Wilhelm II of Prussia was traveling through Courland at this time and a meeting with Starck appears to have caused the prince to leave the Strict Observance order.
- Starck's views and personality soon made him unwelcome in Mitau, and in 1781 he secured an appointment at Darmstadt as the court chaplain and general superintendent of schools for Gießen and Darmstadt, where he finished out his career.
- Starck's Ancient and New Mysteries (1782) revisited earlier work on ancient mystery religions and compared these with modern freemasonry; while finding some similarities, he rejected any historical continuity.
- In his anonymous 1809 plea for ecumenicism The Banquet of Theodulus, which enjoyed numerous editions, he argued that Protestantism could not hold its ground against the naturalistic tendencies of the Enlightenment.
- In 1811 he was raised to the nobility by the Großherzog of Hessen.
- Stark died in Darmstadt on 3 March 1816.

== Bibliography ==
- Apologie des Ordens der Freymaurer / Von dem Bruder **** Mitgliede der ** Schottischen Loge zu P.*. Freimaurer [Anon.] (Königsberg, 1770; fully revised 2nd edn, Berlin, 1778).
- De tralatitiis et gentilismo in religionem christianam liber singularis (Königsberg, 1774).
- Hephästion (Königsberg, 1775; 2nd edn, 1776).
- Geschichte der christlichen Kirche des ersten Jahrhunderts, 3 vols. (Berlin and Leipzig, 1779–80).
- Freymüthige Betrachtungen über das Christenthum [Anon.] (Berlin, 1780; much expanded 2nd edn, 1782).
- Ueber den Zweck und Nutzen des Freymaurerordens [Anon.] (Berlin, 1781).
- Saint Nicaise, oder eine Sammlung merkwürdiger maurerischer Briefe, für Freymaurer und die es nicht sind [Anon.] (Frankfurt/Main, 1785).
- Ueber Krypto-Katholicismus, Proselytenmacherey, Jesuitismus, geheime Gesellschaften und besonders die ihm selbst von den Verfassern der Berliner Monatsschrift gemachte Beschuldigungen, mit Acten-Stücken belegt, 2 vols. (Frankfurt/Main and Leipzig, 1787).
- Der Triumph der Philosophie im achtzehnten Jahrhunderte, 2 vols. [Anon.] (Frankfurt/Main, 1803).
- Theoduls Gastmahl, oder über die Vereinigung der verschiedenen christlichen Religions Societäten [Anon.] (Frankfurt/Main, 1809; 2nd edn, 1811; 3rd edn, 1813; 4th edn, 1815; 5th edn, 1817).
- De Aeschylo et eius imprimis tragoedia ‘Prometheus vinctus’ inscripta est libellus (Göttingen, 1763).
- Commentationum et observationum philologico-criticarum (Königsberg, 1769).
- Antrittspredigt zum Hofpredigeramt (Königsberg, 1770).
- Dissertatio inauguralis de usu antiquarum versionum Scripturae Sacrae interpretationis subsidio (Königsberg, 1773).
- Antrittspredigt zum Oberhofpredigeramt (Königsberg, 1776).
- Neujahrs- und Abschiedspredigt (Königsberg, 1777).
- Ueber die alten und neuen Mysterien (Berlin, 1782; 2nd edn, 1817).
- Versuch einer Geschichte des Arianismus, 2 vols (Berlin, 1783–85).
- Wahrhafte Begebenheiten einiger Brüder Freymaurer, die sich durch ein falsches Licht blenden ließen, und endlich zur wahren Erkenntniss gelangten. Von ihnen selbst in Briefen an ihre Freunde geschrieben (1786).
- Auch Etwas, wider das Etwas der Frau von der Recke über des Oberhofprediger Starcks Vertheidigungsschrift (Leipzig, 1788).
- Beleuchtung der letzten Anstrengung des herrn Kessler von Sprengseysen, seine verehrungswürdigen Obern, die Berliner und sich selbst vor aller Welt zu vertheidigen. Nebst einigen Erwägungen, das neue Betragen der Berliner betreffend (Leipzig, 1788).
- Christian Nicolai Buchführers zu Bebenhausen in Schwaben. Wichtige Entdeckungen auf einer gelehrten Reise durch Deutschland, und aus Eifer für die christliche, vornehmlich evangelische Kirche durch den Druck bekannt gemacht [Anon.] (Dessau and Leipzig, 1788).
- Dokumentirter Anti-Wehrt, nebst einer kurzen Abfertigung der drey Berliner und des Herrn Carl von Sacken (Frankfurt/Main and Leipzig, 1789).
- Apologismus an das bessere Publikum (Halle and Leipzig, 1789).
- Geschichte der Taufe und Taufgesinnten (Leipzig, 1789).
- Theoduls Briefwechsel. Seitenstück zu Theoduls Gastmahl [Anon.] (Frankfurt/Main, 1828).
