= Johann Jacob Ferber =

Swedish mineralogist (1743–1790)

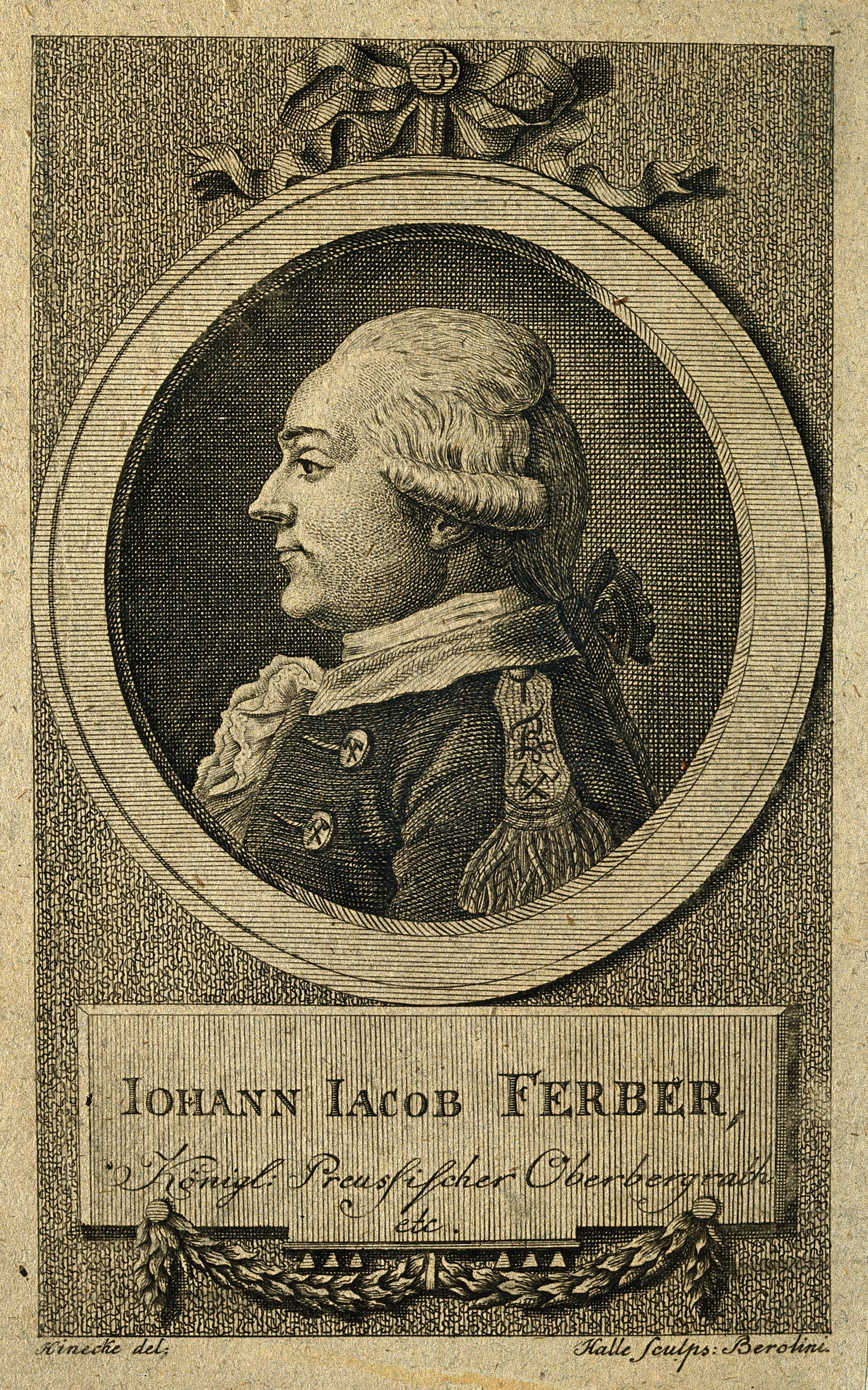
- Engraved portrait of Johann Jacob Ferber
- Born: August 29, 1743; Karlskrona, Sweden
- Died: April 12, 1790 (aged 46); Bern, Switzerland
- Occupation(s): Mineralogist, Geologist
- Years active: 1761–1790
- Parents: Johan Henrik Ferber (father); Eva Maria (née Ankarcrona) (mother)

Johann Jacob Ferber (29 August 1743 – April 1790) was a Swedish mineralogist. He came from a family of scientifically inclined pharmacists. He studied natural history with an emphasis on mineralogy at Uppsala University, where Carl Linnaeus was one of his teachers and supervisor of his thesis. After his graduation, Ferber embarked on an international and largely itinerant career. He held the chair in chemistry and natural history of the Academia Petrina in Jelgava 1774–1783, and was professor of mineralogy in Saint Petersburg 1783–1786. He was elected member of the Russian Academy of Sciences and of the Prussian Academy of Sciences. He died in Switzerland in 1790 during one of his many travels.

Ferber published his observations in books and publications of learned societies, and sustained an important network of scientists during a time when the sciences of mineralogy and geology were undergoing rapid development. Despite being widely recognised as an accomplished scientist by his contemporaries, his achievements were later to some degree neglected.

== Biography ==
=== Background and early life ===
Johann Jacob Ferber was born on 29 August 1743 in Karlskrona, Sweden. His parents were Johan Henrik Ferber and Eva Maria, née Ankarcrona. Johan Henrik Ferber was a chemist and pharmacist, with the exclusive privilege of providing medicines to the Swedish Navy (and hence with the title amiralitetsapotekare). He was also a member of the Royal Swedish Academy of Sciences. Johann Jacob's grandfather, Johan Eberhard Ferber, was also a pharmacist to the Navy with scientific interests; he planted a botanical garden in Augerum and kept a cabinet of curiosities. He was also a lifelong friend of botanist Kilian Stobæus, and was allegedly the first naturalist in Sweden to adopt the new system of classification by Carl Linnaeus.

Johann Jacob Ferber received a thorough education, thanks to his affluent parents. He enrolled at Uppsala University in 1761, where his father wanted him to study medicine. While receiving a broad education in natural history, he eventually came to specialise in mineralogy. Ferber had close access to some of Sweden's most accomplished scientists of the time; he attended the lectures of Linnaeus, who also supervised his thesis in 1763, and he lived in the house of astronomer Fredric Mallet, who also taught him astronomy and mathematics. His teachers in mineralogy were above all Anton von Swab, a mineralogist, mining director and educator, and mineralogist Johan Gottschalk Wallerius, whom Ferber probably stayed with in Säter, where Wallerius worked as a mine manager and received a small number of students annually to teach in situ.

=== International career ===
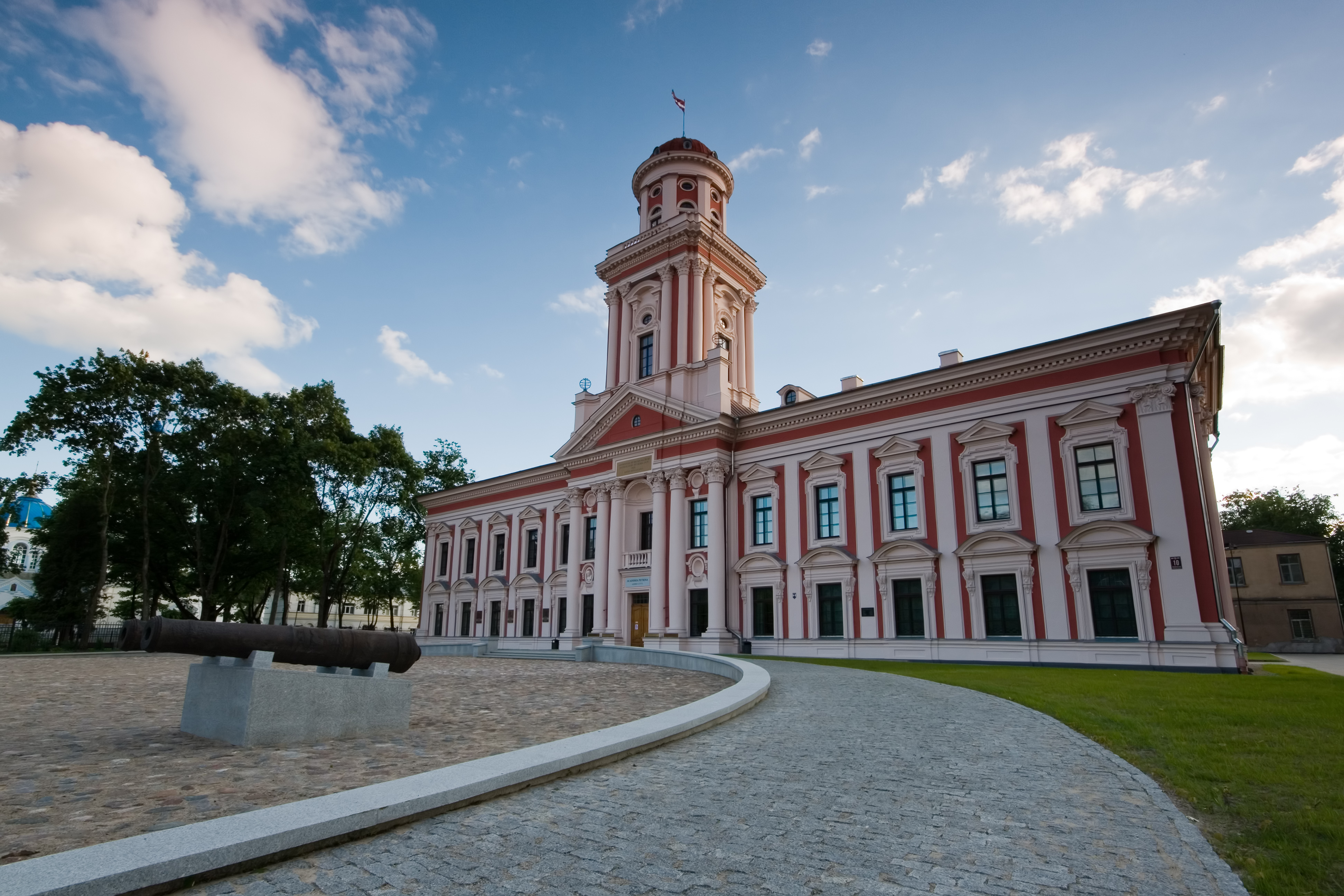
Academia Petrina in Jelgava, where Ferber held the chair in chemistry and natural history 1774–1783

After graduation, Ferber was employed at the Swedish Board of Mines, spent some time visiting Swedish mines, and briefly returned to his native city. However, already in 1765 he set out on his first long trip abroad. He would henceforth spend most of his life travelling through Europe. His first destination was Berlin, where he stayed for some time to continue his studies under the tutelage of Andreas Sigismund Marggraf and Johann Friedrich Pott. The following years, 1768 to 1771, he spent visiting important mining districts in present-day Germany (the Harz and Palatinate regions, and Bavaria), as well as in Holland, Bohemia, Cornwall, Derbyshire, France, and particularly Hungary. While in England, he declined an offer to join Daniel Solander in accompanying James Cook on the First voyage of James Cook. In Hungary, he met mineralogist Ignaz von Born, who would remain a life-long friend.

In the summer of 1770 he briefly returned to Sweden, where he successfully lobbied the Royal Swedish Academy of Sciences to elect Ignaz von Born as a corresponding member. In May 1771 he was again abroad, going via Copenhagen, Germany and Prague to Italy, where he would remain from September 1771 until August 1772, accompanying the young nobleman Emanuel De Geer (the son of Charles De Geer, another renowned Swedish naturalist). In Italy, Ferber studied the minerals and geology of the Alps and the Apennine Mountains, and with particular interest, the volcanoes of Italy – especially Vesuvius. The following year, he was again visiting Bohemia and Hungary.

He then returned to Sweden, again only briefly, before moving to Mitau (present-day Jelgava) to take up the chair in chemistry and natural history of the Academia Petrina, a position he had been offered by the Duke of Courland and Semigallia, Peter von Biron. He would stay there for nine years, making regional excursions and a longer trip through Poland in 1781. In 1783 he moved on to Saint Petersburg, where he had been offered a professorship in mineralogy and was also elected member of the Russian Academy of Sciences. He was later offered the position of master of mines of the Russian Imperial mines in Siberia, but declined and in 1786 resigned from his professorship in Saint Petersburg.

He had made another brief visit to Sweden in 1785, where he also personally met with King Gustav III, and in 1786 was elected member of the Prussian Academy of Sciences.

=== Illness and death ===
His health started to deteriorate in 1787, and he died in April 1790 in Bern, Switzerland during one of his travels. He was honoured by being buried next to Swiss naturalist Albrecht von Haller.

== Contributions to science ==
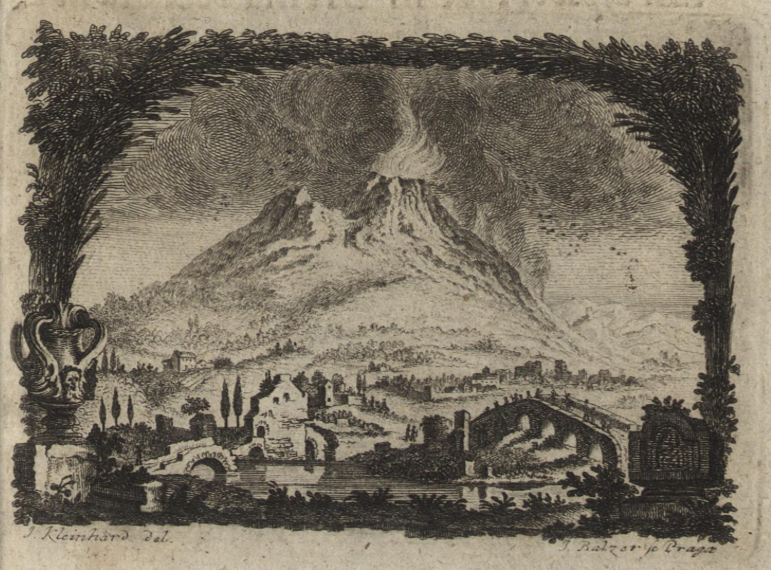
The frontispiece from the first edition of Ferber's Briefe aus Wälschland (1773)

Ferber was a celebrated scientist during his lifetime, although his achievements have later been somewhat overlooked. Ferber's skill as a naturalist was noted by many of his contemporaries, including Joseph Banks and Benjamin Franklin. Throughout his wide-ranging travels, he took notes and published his observations on mineralogy and geology both in separate books, and in the proceedings of different learned societies. In particular the observations from his Italian trip, published in German in 1773 as Herrn Johann Jakob Ferbers Briefe aus Wälschland über natürliche Merkwürdigkeiten dieses Landes, and later translated into French and English, was widely read and disseminated through Europe.

Ferber also sustained a thriving network of scientific contacts. He was in continuous contact with Linnaeus, contributing not only to spreading the ideas of Linnaeus throughout Europe, but also serving as a contact point for scientists wishing to get into contact with Linnaeus. In a similar fashion, he facilitated contacts between and the development of new ideas among other scientists. For example, he edited and partly funded the publication of an important thesis on chemical analysis of minerals (Sciagraphia regni mineralis) by his friend Torbern Bergman.

He also provided the scientific community with important mineral samples for analysis and study. For instance, he supplied Charles De Geer with minerals for his collections at Lövstabruk, and it was thanks to samples of mosaic from Pompeii provided by Ferber that Torben Bergman could for the first time demonstrate that these were made of glass paste, not stone.

Ferber was active at a time when the sciences of geology and mineralogy was undergoing rapid development, and played a central role in this movement. Italian historian Marco Beretta has summarised the achievements of Ferber as "one of the principal protagonists in these advances and during the course of a very full and distinguished career managed to construct a network of international scientific ties that provided a secure reference point for those in any country of Europe who wished to undertake the study of this new and promising sector of the natural sciences."

== Sources cited ==
- Beretta, Marco (2007). "Linnaeans in Italy. The Case of Johann Jakob Ferber". In Beretta, Marco; Tosi, Alessandro (eds.). Linnaeus in Italy; the spread of a revolution in science. Science History Publications/USA. pp. 91–112. ISBN 978-0881353938.
- Dahl, Torsten, ed. (1948). Svenska män och kvinnor. Biografisk uppslagsbok [Swedish men and women. Biographical dictionary] (in Swedish). Vol. 2. Stockholm: Albert Bonnier. OCLC 4629338.
- Hildebrand, Bengt (1956). "Johan Eberhard Ferber". Svenskt biografiskt lexikon (in Swedish). Vol. 15. p. 588 – via Swedish National Archives.
- Hofberg, Herman; Heurlin, Frithiof; Millqvist, Viktor; Rubenson, Olof, eds. (1906). Svenskt biografiskt handlexikon [Swedish biographical handbook] (in Swedish). Vol. 1. Stockholm: Bonniers. OCLC 474064019.
- Zenzén, Nils (1956). "Johan (Johann) Jacob Ferber". Svenskt biografiskt lexikon (in Swedish). Vol. 15. p. 589 – via Swedish National Archives.
