= Jelgava Gymnasium =

School in Jelgava, Latvia

Coordinates: 56°39′0″N 23°43′45″E

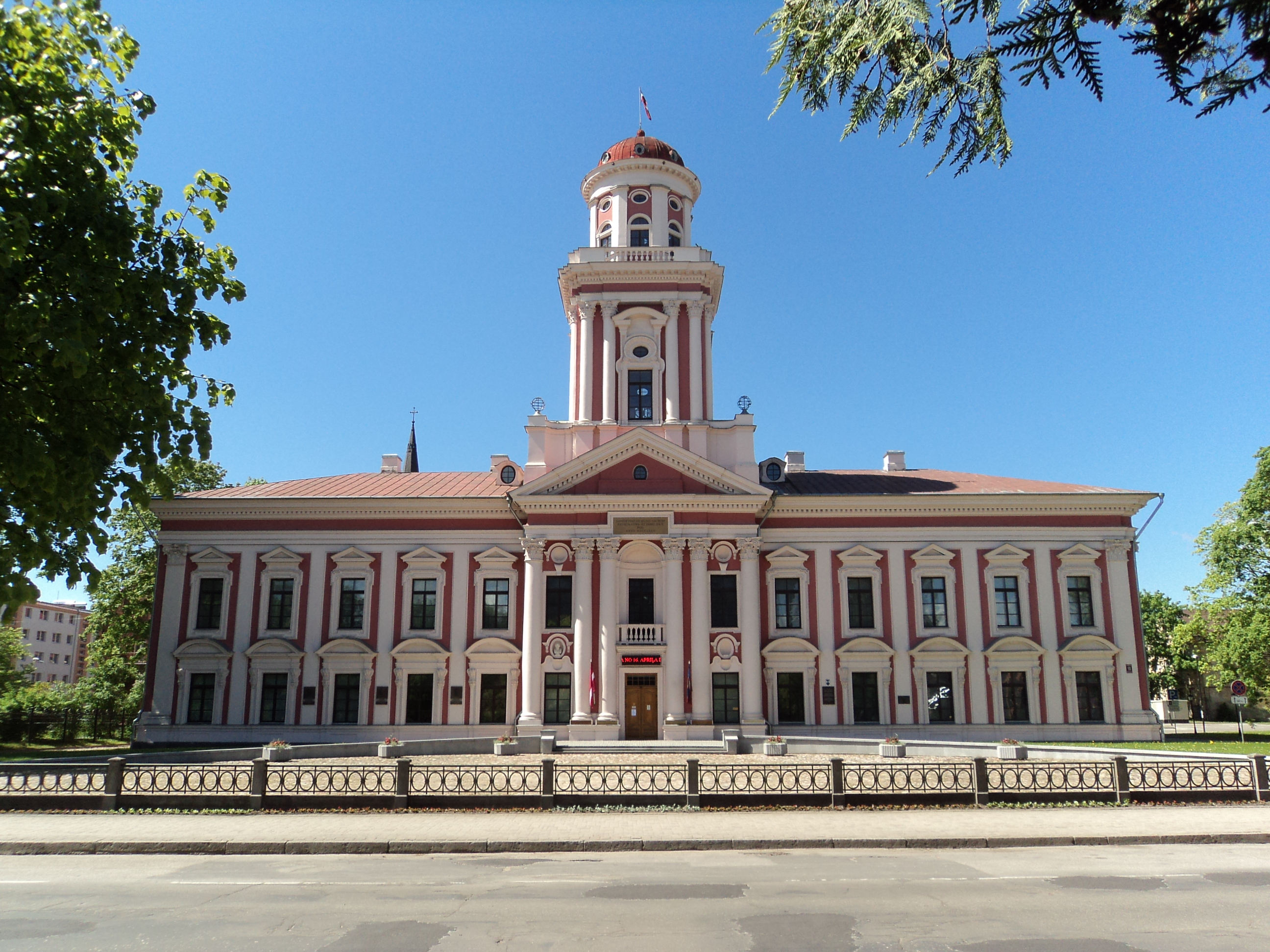
Historical building of Academia Petrina (now Ģederts Eliass Jelgava History and Art Museum)

Jelgava Gymnasium or Academia Petrina is the oldest higher educational establishment in Latvia. Based on an idea by Friedrich Wilhelm von Raison, it was established in Mitau, capital of the Duchy of Courland and Semigallia, by Duke Peter von Biron in 1775. The duke wanted to attract professors like Immanuel Kant and Johan Gottfried Herder, but they refused.

After the partitions of the Polish–Lithuanian Commonwealth, Jelgava became part of the Russian Empire and the gymnasium unsuccessfully petitioned to become a university. Nevertheless, it became an important cultural hub not only for Latvians, but also Lithuanians. Many famous professors had lectured in Academia Petrina for example Johann Benjamin Koppe (1775), Johann August von Starck (1777–1781) and Wilhelm Gottlieb Friedrich Beitler (1775–1811).

During World War I, the school was evacuated to Taganrog in Rostov Oblast while its 42,000-volume library was burned by troops of Pavel Bermondt-Avalov. During World War II, the historical school building was almost completely destroyed, therefore school was reestablished in new premises. The original building was later restored and now functions as the Ģederts Eliass Jelgava History and Art Museum.

== Name ==
- 1775 Academia Petrina
- Gymnasium Petrinum
- since 1837: official name in German Gouvernements-Gymnasium
- 1934 to 1940: Hercoga Pētera ģimnāzija (Herzog-Peter-Gymnasium)
- after 1945: Jelgavas 1. vidusskola (Jelgavan Secondary School Nr. 1)
- 15. August 1991: 1. Gymnasium
- 2012: Jelgavas Tehnoloģiju vidusskola (Technical Secondary School Jelgava)

== History ==
The establishment of the academy was based on an idea by Friedrich Wilhelm von Raison: "But the whole province owes him excellent thanks for the effective part, which he took at the foundation of the Mitauian Gymnasium. He was actually the one who persuaded Duke Peter to do so; it was he who corresponded with Sulzern regarding the plan to be drawn up and because of the appointment of the first teachers and he who prescribed the books for the library and the instruments for the observatory; just as he also continuously participated in the perfection of the institute until his death".

The intention was to establish a complete university with all four faculties in Mitau. This plan was rejected because of Kurland's dependence on Catholic-Polish rule. Under the law of Poland a university could not be founded without the consent and confirmation of the Pope, and it was unclear whether and when the permission by the papal curia to establish a Protestant theological faculty could have been obtained. Therefore, this intention was abandoned and it was decided to found an academic gymnasium which - half school, half university - should enjoy all the rights of a university, with the exception of the privilege of granting academic dignity.

== People ==
=== Notable students ===
Name	Birth	Death	Later occupation
Karl Ferdinand Amenda	1771	1836	Music teacher and close friend of Ludwig van Beethoven
Jānis Čakste	1859	1927	President of Latvia
Alberts Kviesis	1881	1944	President of Latvia
Antanas Smetona	1874	1944	President of Lithuania
Ernestas Galvanauskas	1882	1967	Prime Minister of Lithuania
Mykolas Sleževičius	1882	1939	Prime Minister of Lithuania
Krišjānis Barons	1835	1923	Latvian folklorist
Kārlis Mīlenbahs	1853	1916	Latvian philologist
Wincenty Lutosławski	1863	1954	Polish philosopher

=== Teachers ===
Name	Birth	Death	Occupation at the school
Johann Melchior Beseke	1746	1802	Jurisprudence
Johann Benjamin Koppe	1750	1791	1775, Greek language
Johann August von Starck	1741	1816	1777–1781, Philosophy
Wilhelm Gottlieb Friedrich Beitler	1745	1811	1775–1811 mathematics
Johann Jacob Ferber	1743	1790	chemistry and natural history
Johann Georg Eisen von Schwarzenberg	1717	1779	1776–1777
Heinrich Friedrich Jäger	1747	1811	1775–1789
Johann Nicolaus Tiling	1739	1798	1775–1798
Johann Gabriel Schwemschuch	1733	1803	1775–1798
Matthias Friedrich Watson	1733	1805	
Johann Gottlieb von Groschke	1760	1828	natural history and chemistry
Johann Daniel von Braunschweig	1786	1857	1817–1837
Charles Toussaint	1813	1877	French
Magnus Georg Paucker	1787	1855	1813–1855 mathematics und astronomy
