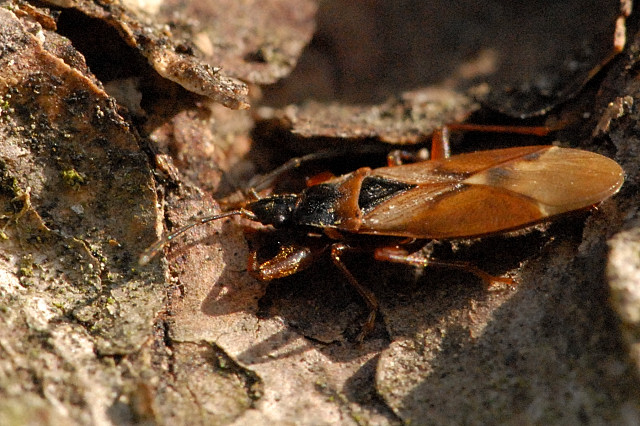
- Gastrodes abietum

Scientific classification
- Kingdom: Animalia
- Phylum: Arthropoda
- Clade: Pancrustacea
- Class: Insecta
- Order: Hemiptera
- Suborder: Heteroptera
- Family: Rhyparochromidae
- Subfamily: Rhyparochrominae
- Tribe: Drymini
- Genus: Gastrodes; Westwood, 1840

= Gastrodes =

Genus of true bugs

Gastrodes is a genus of dirt-colored seed bugs in the family Rhyparochromidae. Species of Gastrodes have been recorded from Europe through to temperate Asia and North America.

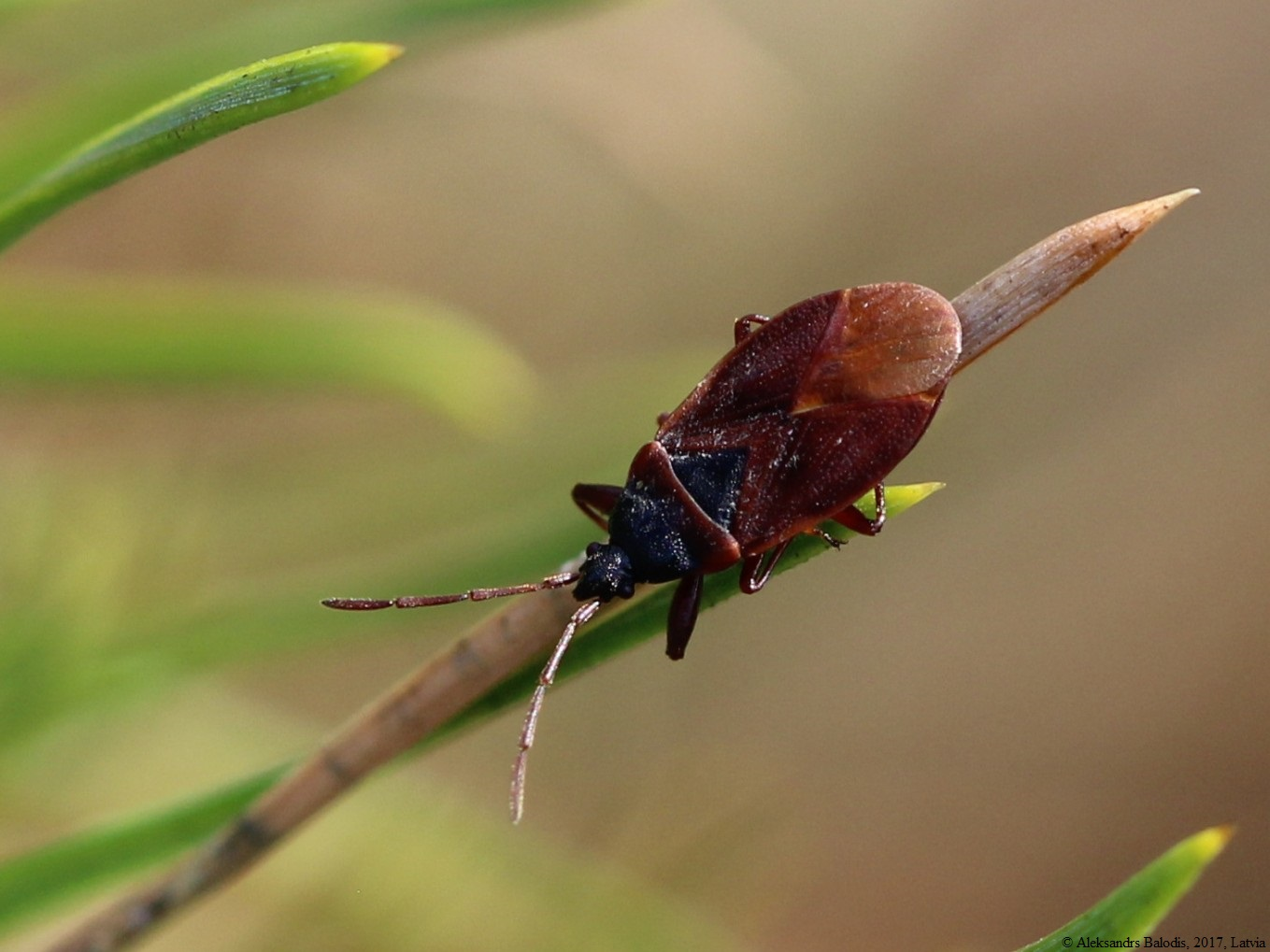
Gastrodes grossipes

== Species ==
These 14 species belong to the genus Gastrodes:

- Gastrodes abietum Bergroth, 1914
- Gastrodes arizonensis Usinger, 1938
- Gastrodes chinensis Zheng, 1981
- Gastrodes conicolus Usinger, 1933
- Gastrodes crassifemur Zheng, 1979
- Gastrodes grossipes DeGeer, 1773
- Gastrodes intermedius Usinger, 1938
- Gastrodes longirostris Puton, 1884
- Gastrodes pacificus (Provancher, 1885–1890)
- Gastrodes parvulus Kerzhner, 1977
- Gastrodes piceus Zheng, 1979
- Gastrodes pilifer Zheng, 1979
- Gastrodes remotus Usinger, 1938
- Gastrodes walleyi Usinger, 1938
