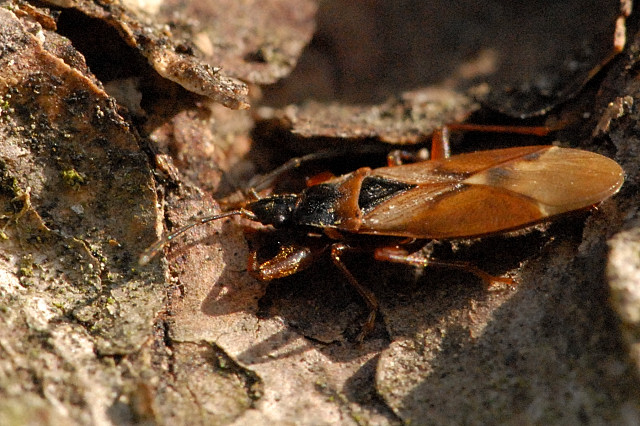
- Gastrodes abietum, spruce cone bug, Belgium

Scientific classification
- Kingdom: Animalia
- Phylum: Arthropoda
- Clade: Pancrustacea
- Class: Insecta
- Order: Hemiptera
- Suborder: Heteroptera
- Family: Rhyparochromidae
- Subfamily: Rhyparochrominae
- Tribe: Drymini
- Genus: Gastrodes
- Species: G. abietum

Binomial name
- Gastrodes abietum Bergroth, 1914

= Gastrodes abietum =

Species of dirt-colored seed bug

Gastrodes abietum, the spruce cone bug, is a species of dirt-colored seed bug in the family Rhyparochromidae. It is found in the Palearctic.

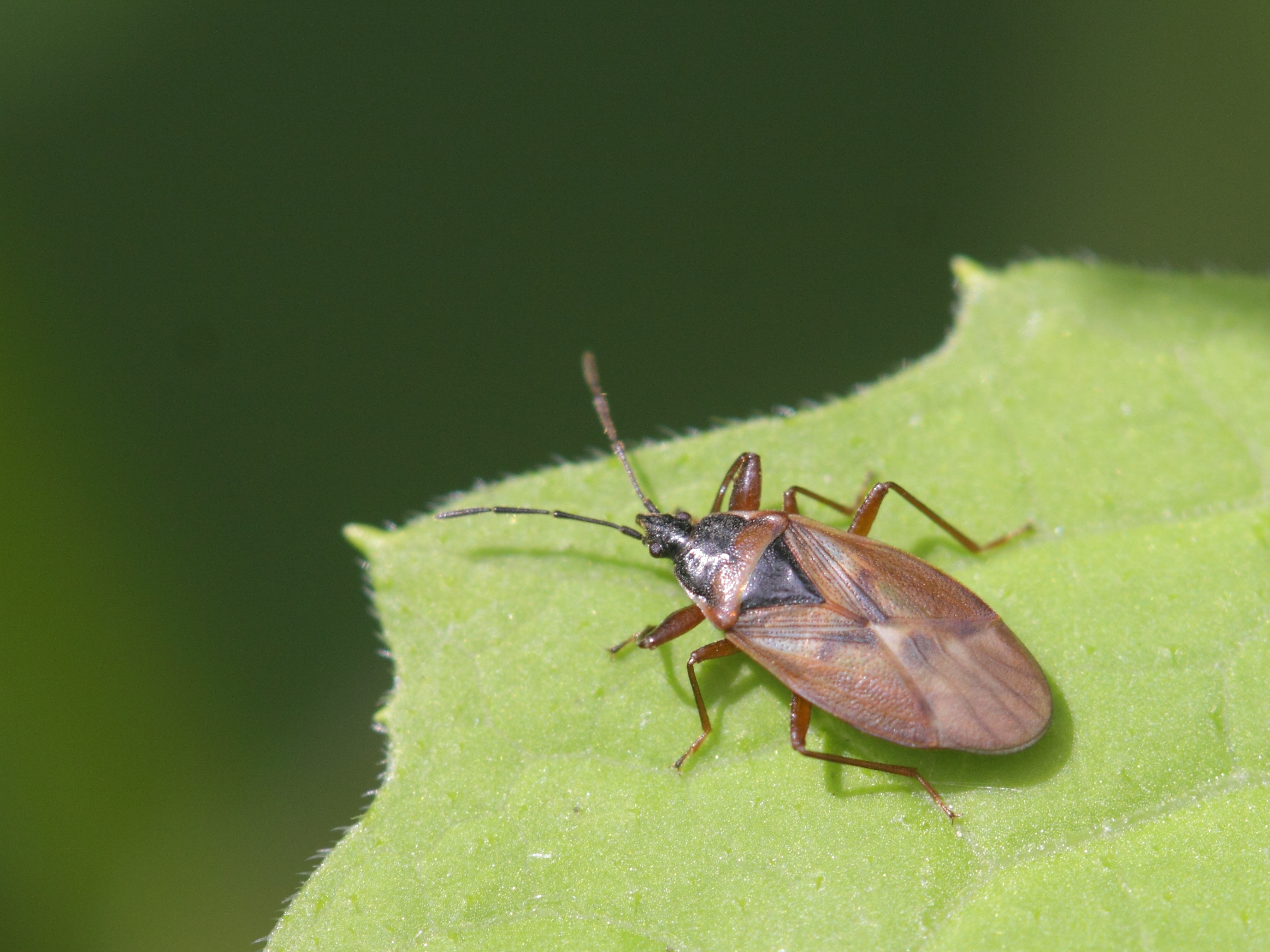
Gastrodes abietum, spruce cone bug
