= Gastrodes pacificus =

Scientific classification
- Domain: Eukaryota
- Kingdom: Animalia
- Phylum: Arthropoda
- Class: Insecta
- Order: Hemiptera
- Suborder: Heteroptera
- Family: Rhyparochromidae
- Tribe: Drymini
- Genus: Gastrodes
- Species: G. pacificus

Binomial name
- Gastrodes pacificus (Provancher, 1885–1890)

Species of true bug

Gastrodes pacificus is a species of dirt-colored seed bug in the family Rhyparochromidae. It is found in North America.
