= Johann Benjamin Koppe =

German Lutheran theologian

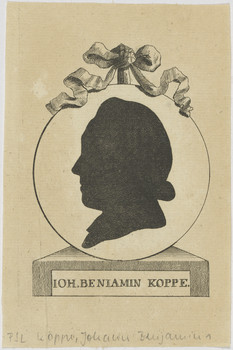
Johann Benjamin Koppe

Johann Benjamin Koppe (19 August 1750 in Danzig – 12 February 1791 in Hanover) was a German Lutheran theologian. He originated the "fragment hypothesis" (1783) in response to the Synoptic problem.

He studied at the universities of Leipzig and Göttingen, where in 1775 he became a professor of theology. In 1784 he relocated to Gotha as a senior pastor, upper consistory and general superintendent, then in 1788 moved to Hanover as first court chaplain at the Schlosskirche, consistory and general superintendent for the Grafschaft Hoya.

== Published works ==
- Pindari Carmina et fragmenta : cum lectionis varietate et annotationibus, (3 volumes); with Christian Gottlob Heyne and Gottfried Hermann, edition of Pindar, (Greek and Latin; Latin prose version by Koppe. Volume 3 by Gottfried Hermann ..."Commentatio de metris Pindari. Scholia"). Publisher: Oxonii : R. Bliss, 1807-1809.
- D. Robert Lowth's Lord Bischofs zu London ... Jesaias : neu übersetzt nebst einer Einleitung und critischen philologischen und erläuternden Anmerkungen, 1779–1781; (German translation of Robert Lowth by Georg Hermann Richerz with additions and comments by Koppe).
- Christliches Gesangbuch, 1789 – Christian hymnbook.
- Novum Testamentum Graece : perpetua annotatione illustratum, (10 volumes); continued after Koppe's death by Johann Heinrich Heinrichs, Christoph Friedrich von Ammon and Thomas Christian Tychsen, 1809–1828.
- "Notes on the epistle to the Romans; intended to assist students of theology, and others, who read the scriptures in the originals" by Samuel Hulbeart Turner, 1824; translated from the Latin of Johann Benjamin Koppe.
