= Johann Lotharius Friedrich von Maltzahn =

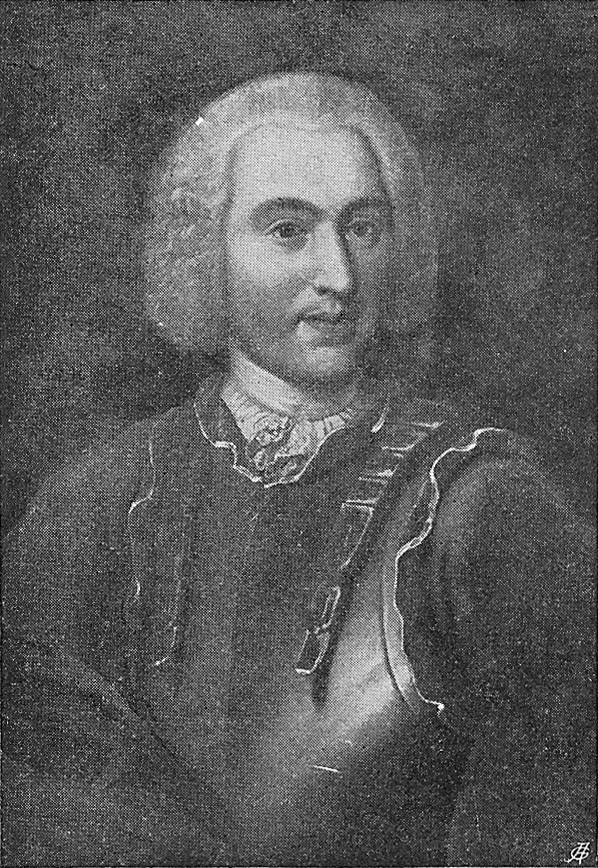
- Born: 13 April 1719; Grübenhagen Castle in Mecklenburg
- Died: 31 December 1756 (aged 37); St. Petersburg
- Parents: Landmarskal,Landraad Levin Joachim v. M. til Grubenhagen (1688-1750) (father); Christine Wilhelmine Löw v. Steinfurth (1696-1732) (mother)

Johann Lotharius Friedrich von Maltzahn (1719–1756) was a Danish diplomat of German origin.

== Biography ==
Born Johan Lotharius Friederich Moltzahn (Maltzahn) on 13 April 1719 in the Grübenhagen Castle in Mecklenburg to Levin Joachim von Malzahn, its owner and Christine Wilhelmine Löw v. Steinfurth (1696–1732). After entering the Danish service, he was sent as a diplomat to St. Petersburg, where in 1750 he founded the Freemasonic lodge ‘Silence’ (Zur Verschweigenheit). In 1751 he was appointed Danish Ambassador to the Russian Empire. He died on 31 December 1756.

According to historical records:

Following the example of several of his relatives, von Moltzahn sought employment in Danish state service and held a court position for a few years. In 1751, he entered diplomacy and immediately took on the very important role of Danish envoy in St. Petersburg. Despite lacking any formal diplomatic training, he carried out his duties excellently due to his tact and diligence. Additionally, he was a very handsome man, which greatly contributed to winning the favor of Empress Elizabeth.

His primary task was to secure Russia’s involvement in a territorial exchange agreement, but the situation was complicated due to Count Lynar’s failed attempts, and new negotiations only seemed to make the Grand Duke even more obstinate. However, von Moltzahn managed to win both the Grand Duchess Catherine and her mother over to the cause, primarily through bribes. It is also possible that Catherine was inclined to listen to von Moltzahn’s suggestions in order to gain the favor of Grand Chancellor von Bestuzhev.

Since the Empress’s frail health made an imminent succession likely, von Moltzahn redoubled his efforts, but in the midst of these, he suddenly died. Rumors that he had been poisoned have no basis in the surviving records. He is described as an honorable and amiable man, though not particularly significant.

— Kammerjunker 1744. Kammerherre 1751.

== Literature ==
- Peter Vedel. "Johann Lotharius Friedrich von Maltzahn". Dansk Biografisk Lexikon, København: Gyldendal 1887–1905.
- Maltzahn und Lisch, Lebensbilder aus dem Geschlechte Maltzahn. Rostock 1871.
