= Ronja Maltzahn =

German musician (born 1993)

Ronja Maltzahn (born 12 December 1993, Bad Pyrmont) is a German singer, songwriter, and multi-instrumentalist. Ronja is a musician skilled in playing the cello, guitar, ukulele, and piano, and she is adept at writing lyrics in various languages. Her musical style combines elements of folk and pop. She leads the BlueBird Orchestra, a group consisting of 15 musicians, dancers, and visual artists who play instruments such as the Nyckelharpa, violin, saxophone, flute, piano, french horn, trumpet, drums, bass, handpan, and contribute to multi-part harmonies. Since 2018, Maltzahn has maintained an active touring schedule, performing over 400 shows in 17 countries, both nationally and internationally. In 2018 the first album "Beautiful Mess" was released first over CD Baby and eventually with Timezone Records. In 2020 the second album Worldpop was released and on the 29th of July 2022 came Heimweh.

== Debate about dreadlocks and cultural appropriation in 2022 ==
For a planned appearance at an event on March 25, 2022, in Hannover, Maltzahn received a last-minute cancellation from a local group of Fridays for Future arguing that from an anti-colonial and anti-racist perspective, it was deemed unacceptable for a white person to wear Dreadlocks on stage.

This is seen as cultural appropriation of a symbol of the black civil rights movement. The incident triggered widespread media coverage and critical comments on the disinvitation Maltzahn herself stated that there are currently much more socially relevant issues.

== Discography ==
Studio albums

- 2018: Beautiful Mess (Timezone Records)
- 2020: Worldpop (Timezone Records)
- 2022: Heimweh (Timezone Records)

== Awards ==
- 2015: 3. Prize of Friedenssong-Wettbewerb, Bonn
- 2021: Panikpreis from the Udo-Lindenberg-Stiftung
- 2022: Promotion award for young songwriters from the Hanns-Seidel-Stiftung
