= Charles De Geer =

Swedish entomologist, industrialist and civil servant (1720–1778)

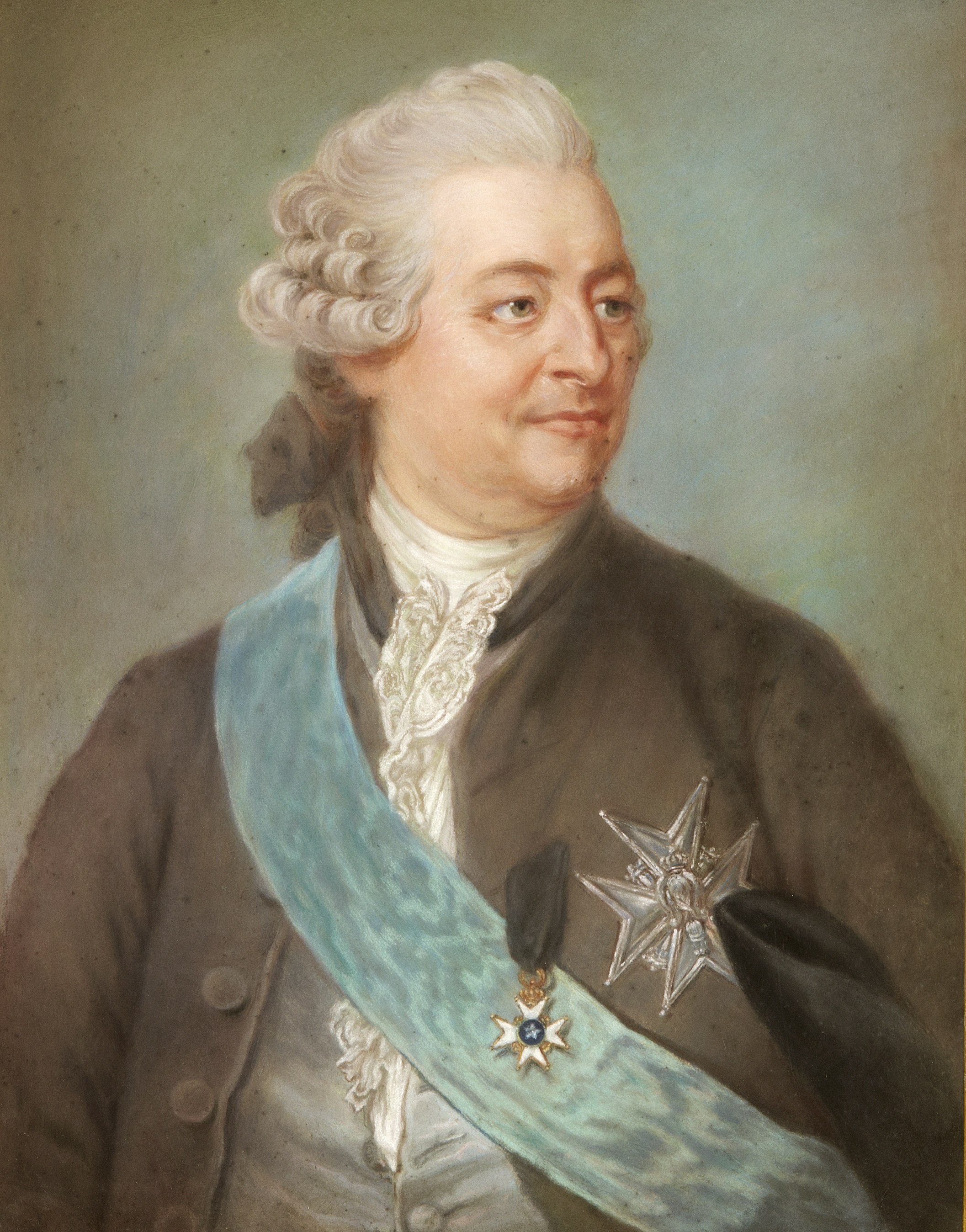
- Portrait by Gustaf Lundberg
- Born: 30 January 1720; Finspång, Sweden
- Died: 7 March 1778 (aged 58); Stockholm, Sweden
- Education: Utrecht University
- Known for: Mémoires pour servir à l'histoire des insectes, 8 vols.
- Awards: Knight, Order of the Polar Star (1761); Commander Grand Cross, Order of Vasa (1772)
- Scientific career
- Fields: Entomology
- Author abbrev. (zoology): de Geer, De Geer

Charles De Geer (30 January 1720 – 7 March 1778) was an entomologist, industrialist, civil servant and book collector. He is sometimes referred to as Charles the Entomologist, to distinguish him from other relatives with the same name. Charles De Geer came from a prominent Swedish-Dutch family. Born in Sweden, he spent most of his childhood and youth in the Dutch Republic. At the age of 18 he moved back to Sweden and would spend the rest of his life there. Upon his return to Sweden, he took over the management of the ironworks of Lövstabruk. He was a successful businessman and with time became one of the richest men in Sweden, head of an early industry employing around 3,000 people. He had a successful civic career, became Marshal of the Court and was elevated to the rank of friherre (baron) in 1773.

De Geer had developed an interest in natural history and particularly entomology when he was still young. After his return to Sweden, his interest transformed into a serious scientific pursuit. He was elected a member of the Royal Swedish Academy of Sciences in 1739 and a corresponding member of the French Academy of Sciences in 1748. He published his main work on entomology, Mémoires pour servir à l'histoire des insectes, in French in eight volumes between 1752 and 1778. In it, he provided descriptions of the behaviour of over 1,400 insect species. In his writings, De Geer among other things brought the importance of insects as pollinators to the attention of the scientific community, and criticised the idea of spontaneous generation.

De Geer was also a book collector. He used his library for his research, but it contained books on many other subjects in several languages. Its sumptuous and rare works, including a collection of music scores, indicate that it was also intended as a way to raise De Geer's social status as an aristocratic collector. Since 1986 it belongs to Uppsala University Library, but most of it is still kept in situ in Lövstabruk, in the pavilion De Geer constructed to house the library.

== Family and name ==
Charles De Geer's father was Jean Jacques (or Jan Jacobus) De Geer, and his mother was Jacquelina Kornelia van Assendelf. His mother was Dutch, and he was a member of the prominent Swedish-Dutch De Geer family. His great-grandfather was Louis De Geer, founder of the Swedish branch of the family.

Charles De Geer married Catharina Charlotta Ribbing in 1743. He was the first member of the De Geer family to marry a Swedish woman. She came from an aristocratic family, and through the marriage Charles De Geer came closer to the royal family. Unusually for the time, his wife organised the inoculation of all their children against smallpox, for which she was later commemorated with a medal. The couple had eight children. Among these his son, also named Charles De Geer, became a politician, and his daughter Hedvig Ulrika De Geer was like her father also a bibliophile and an intellectual.

The family name is spelled with a capitalized De as the particle is not strictly a nobiliary particle, and Charles De Geer himself also treated De as an integral part of the family name.

== Biography ==
=== Early childhood in the Dutch Republic ===
Charles De Geer was born on 30 January 1720 in Finspång in Sweden, but moved to the Dutch Republic when he was three years old. The family owned the estate of Kasteel Rijnhuizen outside Utrecht. His interest in natural sciences began when he was still living in the Dutch Republic. An anecdote claims that his fascination was born when he was given silkworms and could watch their metamorphosis. At the age of sixteen, he organised the garden at the family estate according to the principles of Joseph Pitton de Tournefort, kept pigeons and collected insects and butterflies. Coming from a wealthy family, he was privately tutored by Dutch physicist Pieter van Musschenbroek, law professor Christiaan Hendrik Trotz, and Swedish astronomer Olof Hiorter; he kept in contact with Musschenbroek through letters throughout his life. Pieter van Musschenbroek's brother Jan also constructed a microscope and other scientific instruments for the young Charles De Geer. He entered Utrecht University in 1738.

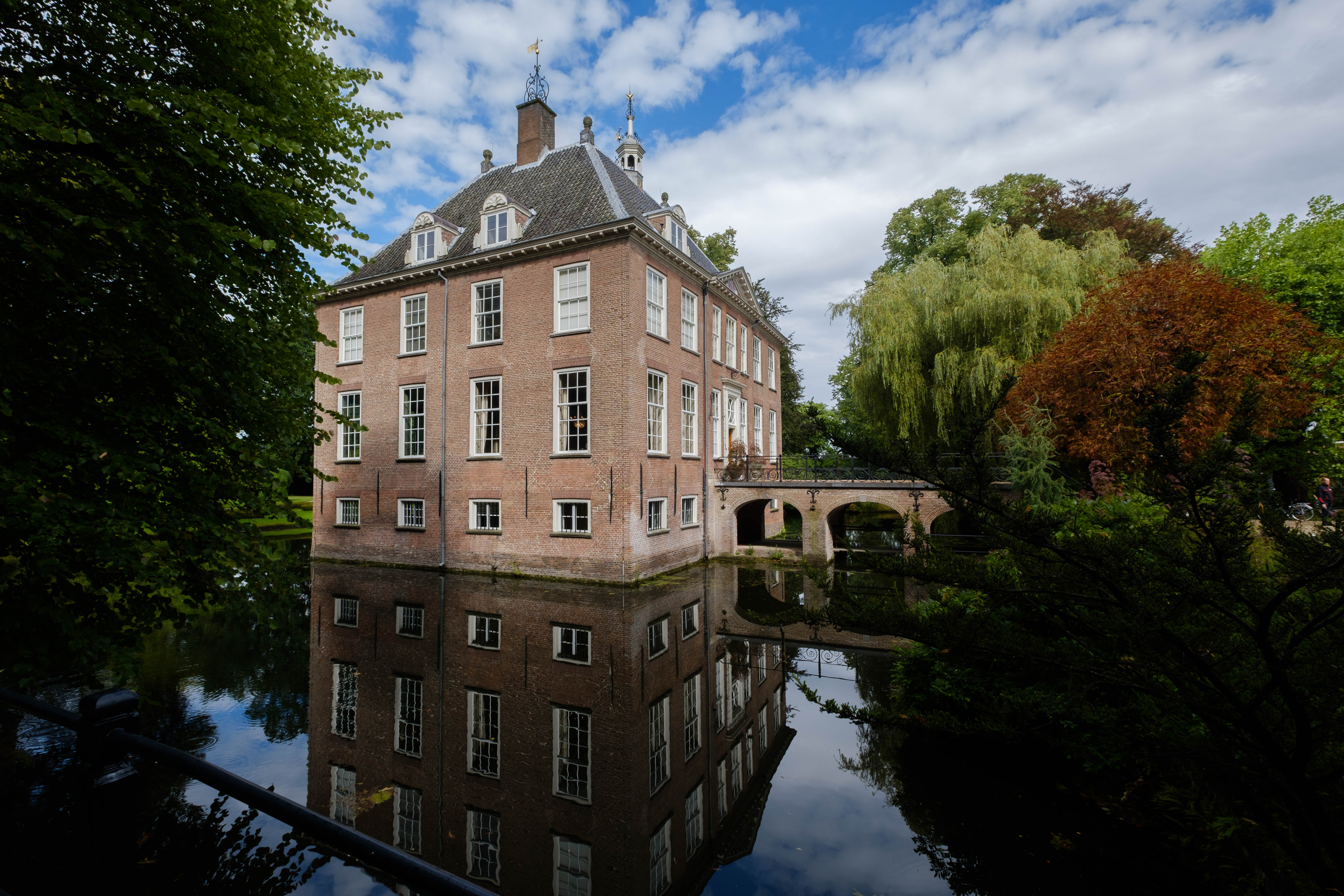
Kasteel Rijnhuizen outside Utrecht, where Charles De Geer grew up

He was brought up speaking Dutch. His journal detailing the trip when he moved to settle in Sweden from Utrecht in 1738 is written in Dutch and so is the first library catalogue he compiled of his collections in Lövstabruk in Sweden, from 1738. The second catalogue, from c. 1750, is written in Swedish, with some remarks in French. After his return to Sweden he appears to have made conscious efforts to learn Swedish and integrate into Swedish society by spending some years in Uppsala (though without formally attending Uppsala University), and soon became fluent in Swedish. In a letter dated less than one year after his arrival in Sweden he addressed the Royal Swedish Academy of Sciences in Swedish and excused himself (according to the article about him in Svenskt biografiskt lexikon "rather unnecessarily") for any spelling mistakes.

=== Return to Sweden and management of Lövstabruk ironworks ===
At the age of ten, Charles De Geer inherited the estate of Lövstabruk in northern Uppland, in Sweden. The estate had belonged to an uncle, also named Charles, who through his will and testament left all his real estate as an entailed estate to Charles De Geer, bypassing two of his older brothers. Charles De Geer did not immediately gain access to the estates, however, due to his young age. Instead, his father assumed the guardianship, while delegating much of the every-day business to his eldest son (and Charles' older brother) Louis, who lived in Finspång in Sweden. Charles' father worked to secure investments in the Netherlands, where loans were cheaper to get than in Sweden, for the estate.

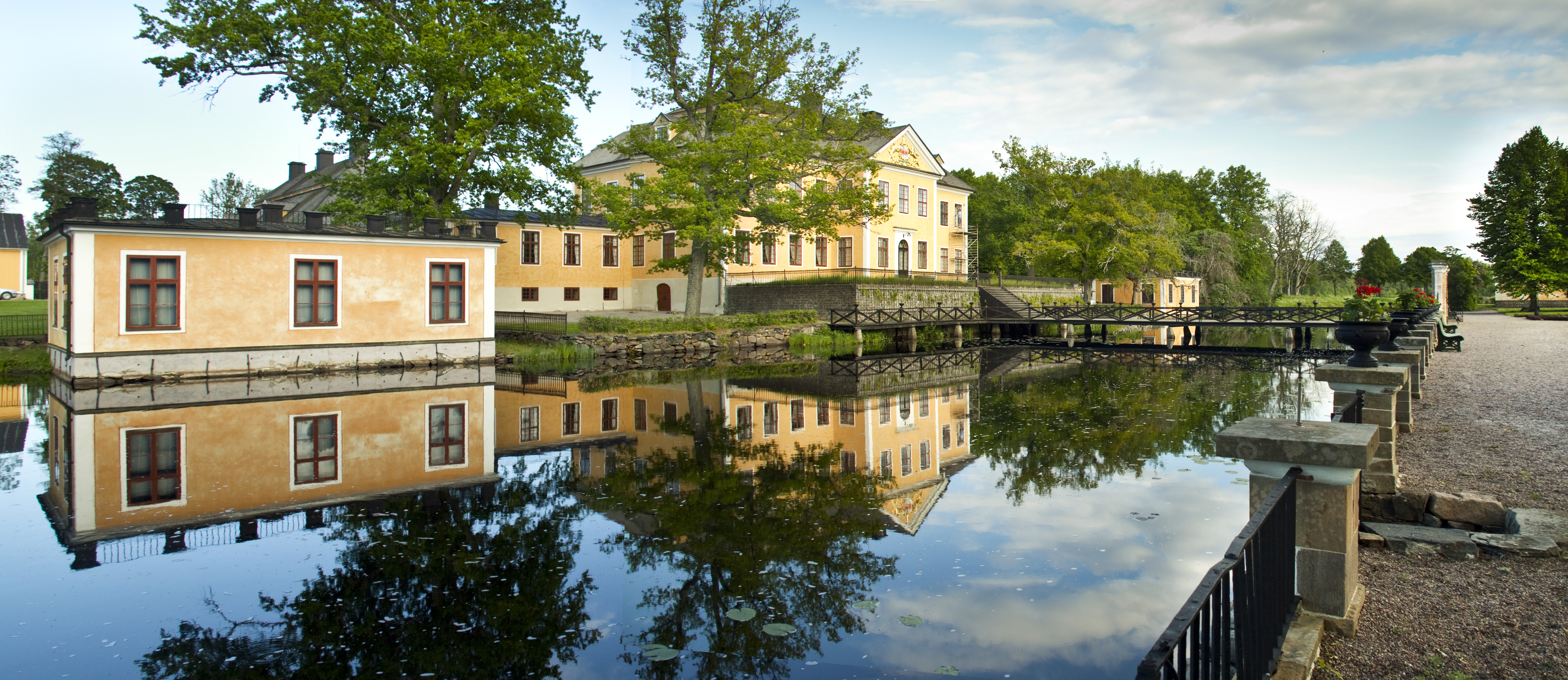
Lövstabruk manor. Charles De Geer completed the reconstruction of the house, and added the two pavilions by the water. The pavilion to the left in the picture housed his library, the one to the right his cabinet of natural history and working library of entomologic literature.

Lövstabruk (also spelled Leufstabruk, Löfstabruk) developed as an ironworks, rather than an agricultural estate; it forms part of a group of iron works in northern Uppland managed largely by Walloon immigrants to Sweden. Tracing its origins to the Middle Ages, it was developed by Charles De Geer's great-grandfather Louis De Geer into an early industrial complex. In the 18th century, it was the most important ironworks in Sweden, and at the time of Charles De Geer employed over 3,000 people. Upon the death of Charles' uncle, the estate was however in an economically precarious state. Lövstabruk had been burnt down by Russian troops in July 1719, during the Russian Pillage of 1719–1721 at the end of the Great Northern War, and the losses incurred then had not fully been recovered. The situation was such that the owner at the time considered abandoning it and moving back to the Dutch Republic.

In the years that followed, Charles' father and elder brother managed to stabilise the economic situation of the estate. In 1738, his father died and Charles moved from Utrecht to Lövstabruk, as planned, to be introduced to the running of the estate. Formally he was not to assume ownership of the estate until the age of 25, but already in 1741 he took over the management of the estate. He ran it until his death and though supported by skilful staff, he took a strong personal interest in it.

He was a highly successful businessman, and eventually became one of the richest people in Sweden. He expanded the estate greatly, partly by acquiring woodland which supplied fuel for the ironworks, and partly by acquiring other ironworks to get rid of competition. He also sold some estates his predecessors had bought, including Österbybruk which he sold to the brothers Claes and Abraham Grill of the Grill family, making considerable profits. In an instruction he left behind for his successor, De Geer stressed the importance of not putting too much trust in administrators and inspectors, not to fret over details too much, to maintain good relations with the clergy and the crown, and to treat the workers well.

=== Refurbishment of Lövstabruk and book collecting ===
After Löfstabruk had been burnt down by Russian troops in 1719, a new main building was built in the 1720s. When Charles De Geer acquired the estate, he enlarged and refurbished it. As an architect he employed court architect Jean Eric Rehn. Two wings were added to the main building and an aviary was built in the park in 1759. In 1765, the interior of the main building was also refurbished to designs by Rehn. Furthermore, two pavilions were built next to the main building, one to house the main library and the other the cabinet of natural history, working library and study of De Geer, respectively.

Whooper swan, manuscript illustration from the Book of Birds (Fogelboken) by Olof Rudbeck the Younger and possibly made by him. Charles De Geer bought the book together with several others when the library of Rudbeck was sold at an auction in 1741.

Charles De Geer was an ardent book collector, and despite his success as an industrialist he is perhaps more remembered for his library, apart from his work as a scientist. He began collecting books already as a boy in Rijnhuizen. A letter from his father dated 1736, when Charles was 16, depicts "a young man with a childlike fascination for nature and the reference library of an established scientist." Twelve years old he already owned works by Maria Sibylla Merian and Jan Goedart. Upon moving to Sweden in 1738, his books and scientific instruments occupied the space of twelve wooden chests. It has been remarked that "this is not the library of a typical adolescent, but a well-considered collection of handbooks, classical literature and scientific works."

Once established in Sweden, he continued acquiring books. De Geer bought several books on natural sciences from Olof Rudbeck the Younger, whom he had come to know in Uppsala, and several more when Rudbeck's library was sold at an auction after his death in 1741. Among these books were some "marvellous" works on botany and zoology, which contributed to making the library famous, also abroad. He also bought books from booksellers in Sweden, though from 1746 most purchases were made by the Luchtmans bookdealers in Leiden, in the Dutch Republic. De Geer's extensive connections with the Dutch book market have been described as a "splendid example of how the globalization of the time impacted small villages far from the large cities."

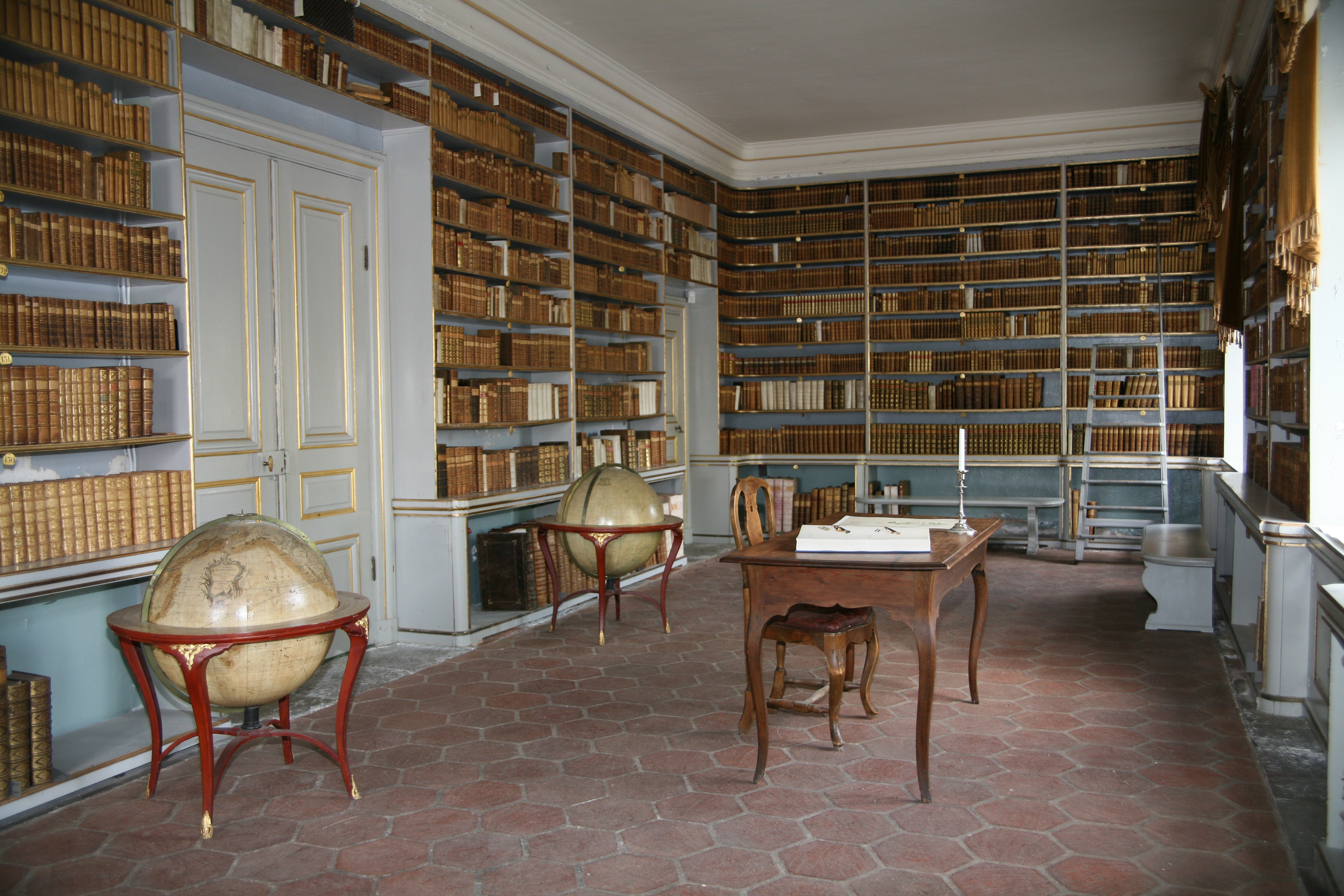
Interior of the main room of Charles De Geer's library at Lövstabruk

Around a quarter of the books in the library are on natural history, notably entomology, and contains several of the standard works on biology and zoology of the day. The library clearly served as a research library, and De Geer's entomological works contain several references to books found in his library; however De Geer also purchased works on religion, philosophy and ethics, law, history, linguistics, travelogues, biographies and fiction. Notably, the library also contained a collection of musical scores (today kept in Uppsala) considered to be one of the finest collections of music from the 18th century in Sweden. It contains around 90 albums of printed works and 37 hand-written manuscripts, with music both by famous composers such as George Frideric Handel and Antonio Vivaldi, as well as music by contemporary Swedish composers like Francesco Uttini and Johan Helmich Roman. Several are works not known from any other library. Indeed, the purpose of Charles De Geer's library appears to at least to some degree have been intended to raise the status of De Geer as an aristocratic collector. Together with the items in his cabinet of natural history, as a private collection it was probably only surpassed by the collection of Count Carl Gustaf Tessin at that time, in Sweden.

The library of Charles De Geer contains around 8,500 volumes (including some additions by later relatives) and most of them are still in their original setting. Most are in French, but the library also contains books in Swedish, Latin, German, Dutch and a few other languages. Out of the 2,159 books printed in the Dutch Republic 296 are editions, and in some cases books, not known from any other collection. In 1986, when the entailment of Lövstabruk was ended, the library was acquired by Uppsala University Library, to avoid the collection to be sold and dispersed abroad. It thus remains "a kind of time capsule from the 18th century" where ephemera like playing cards and hand-written notes have been found between the leaves of the books. The library also contains a celestial and a terrestrial globe, made by globe maker Anders Åkerman.

=== Scientific career ===
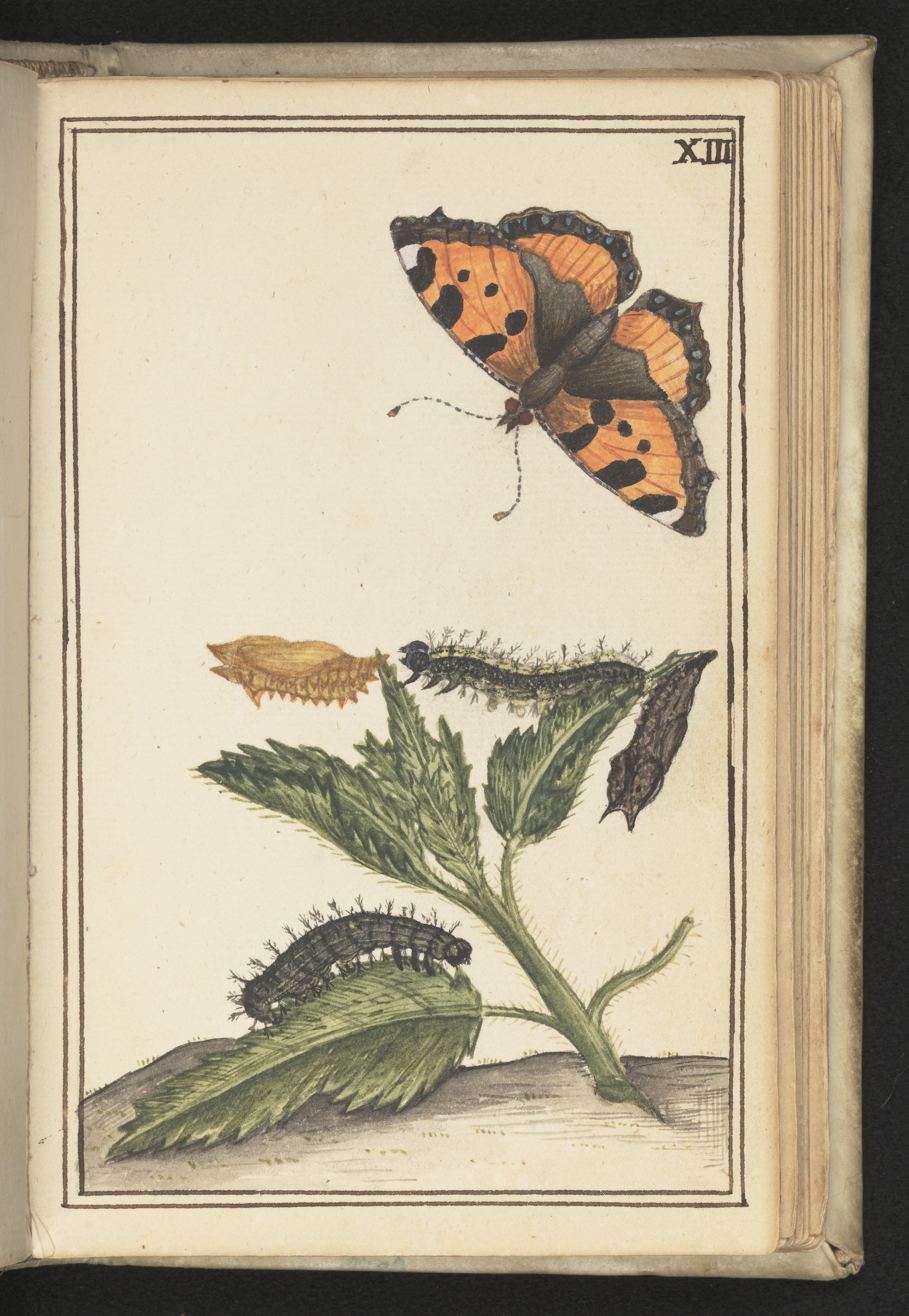
A depiction of a small tortoiseshell (Aglais urticae), by De Geer

The interest in natural history and in particular entomology De Geer had displayed from an early age developed into full scientific activity after his return to Sweden. He probably attended lectures in Uppsala. Moreover, he was elected a member of the Royal Swedish Academy of Sciences at the age of 19 (in 1739) – though the reasons of the Academy for electing De Geer a member was apparently that they hoped he would make a generous donation of money. De Geer never did, but he became an active member of the Academy, contributing with a scientific paper already in 1740.

De Geer contributed several papers to the Transactions of the Academy. One of the first, from 1741, was on a species of spittlebug, Aphrophora salicis, detailing the life cycle of the insect by thorough empirical observation. Earlier scholars, such as Isidore of Seville in the Middle Ages, had held that spittlebugs were produced by the spit of cuckoos, something De Geer showed was manifestly false. In a speech given to the Academy in 1754, he developed a deeper critique of the idea of spontaneous generation, supported by a "rich flood of observations and arguments", as entomologist Felix Bryk writes in his biography of De Geer. De Geer also brought the importance of insects as pollinators to the attention of the scientific community through his writings, which Bryk describes as one of his "most notable accomplishments." He also discovered, independently of Charles Bonnet, the parthenogenesis of aphids. In 1748, De Geer was elected a corresponding member of the French Academy of Sciences.

Portrait and title page of the first volume of De Geer's Mémoires pour servir de l'histoire des insectes

His main contribution as a scientist was however in species research, in the footsteps of René Antoine Ferchault de Réaumur. De Geer paid particular attention to insects which were considered pests or otherwise had some concrete impact related to human activity. His many meticulous observations on the metamorphoses, diet and reproduction of over 1,400 insect species were eventually gathered in his main work, Mémoires pour servir de l'histoire des insectes, published in French in eight volumes between 1752 and 1778. Many species were there described for the first time, though since De Geer was slow to adopt the binary nomenclature of Linnaeus, some were not credited to him. Among the more principal breakthroughs in the Mémoires was the division of hemiptera into several sub-groups, which Johan Christian Fabricius would later develop further. De Geer edited the last volume on his deathbed. He apparently viewed the work as a continuation of the work by Réamur with the same title, considering that he wrote it in French, but it was criticised for simply being an imitation of Réamur's work. However, De Geer's work also corrected Réaumur and its illustrations were considerably more accurate. It remains one of the largest single work on zoology ever produced by a Swede, and is counted among the classics of entomological literature. De Geer, who was an accomplished draughtsman, made all the illustrations (printed using 238 copper plates) himself. A German translation was published in 1776–1782.

De Geer gave away twelve copies of his work to Carl Linnaeus, asking him to provide any of his students who were interested in entomology with a copy. One such copy was given by Linnaeus to Peter Forsskål. De Geer sold some via the book traders Luchtmans in Leiden, who also supplied him with books for his library; preserved accounts show that copies of Mémoires were sold by Luchtmans to established scientists like Job Baster and Eduard Sandifort.

De Geer was, next to Linnaeus, probably the most important biologist in Sweden during the 18th century. He kept in contact with several other naturalists of his day – apart from with Réamur himself, with Bonnet, Pierre Lyonnet, Abraham Trembley and Carl Alexander Clerck. Linnaeus was a personal friend. Linnaeus apparently made good use of the natural history cabinet of De Geer, which in addition to the insects collected by De Geer himself contained specimens he had acquired from other collectors, including Johann Jacob Ferber. Among these were the collections of insects gathered by Daniel Rolander in South America. Linnaeus made over 50 references to De Geer's collections in the ground-breaking 10th edition of Systema Naturae, and De Geer's collection is the only private collection, apart from the aforementioned collection of Tessin, which is separately listed as a source by Linnaeus. De Geer however paid little attention to the questions of systematisation which preoccupied Linnaeus.

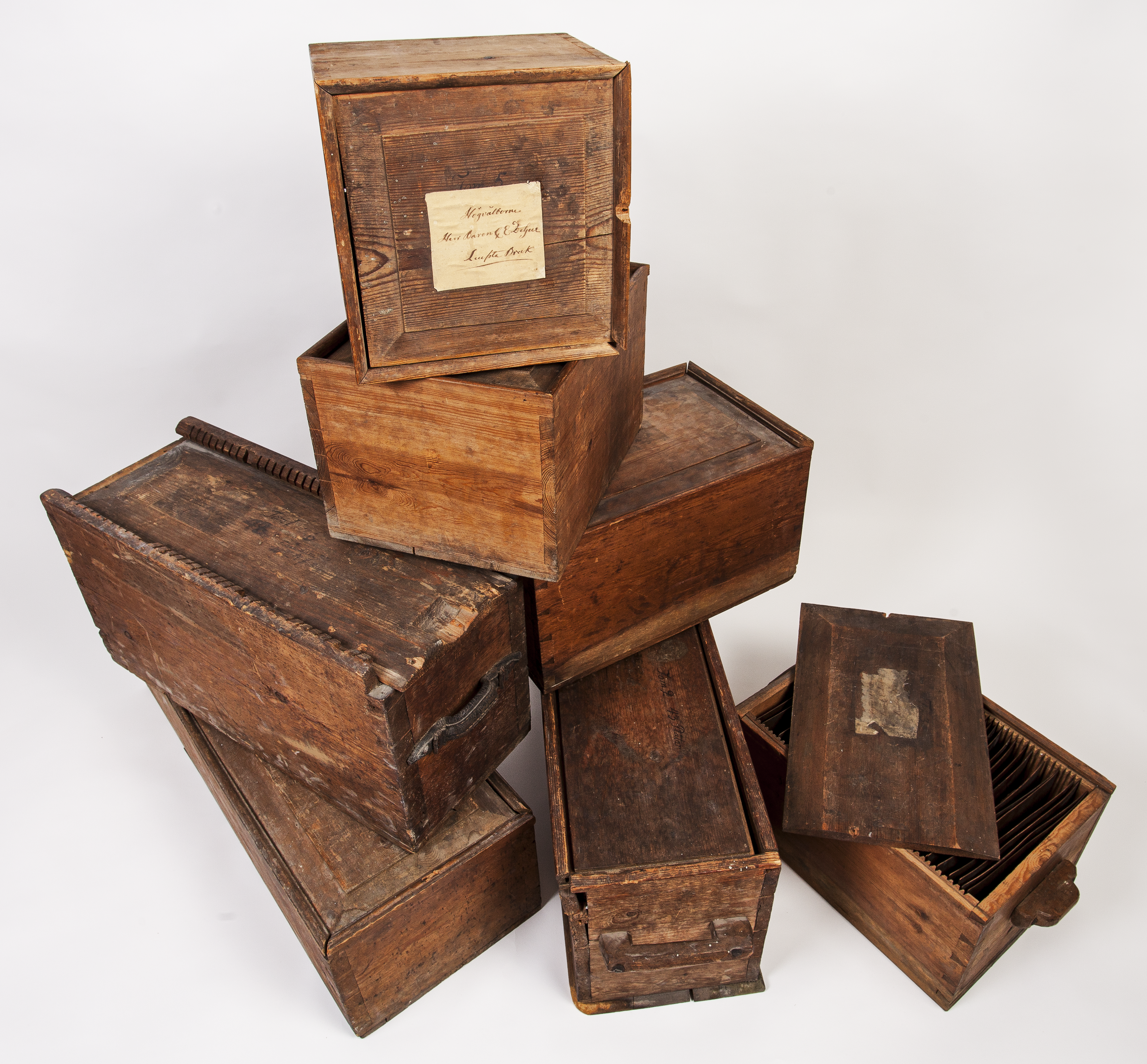
Boxes with original copper plates, preserved in Uppsala University Library

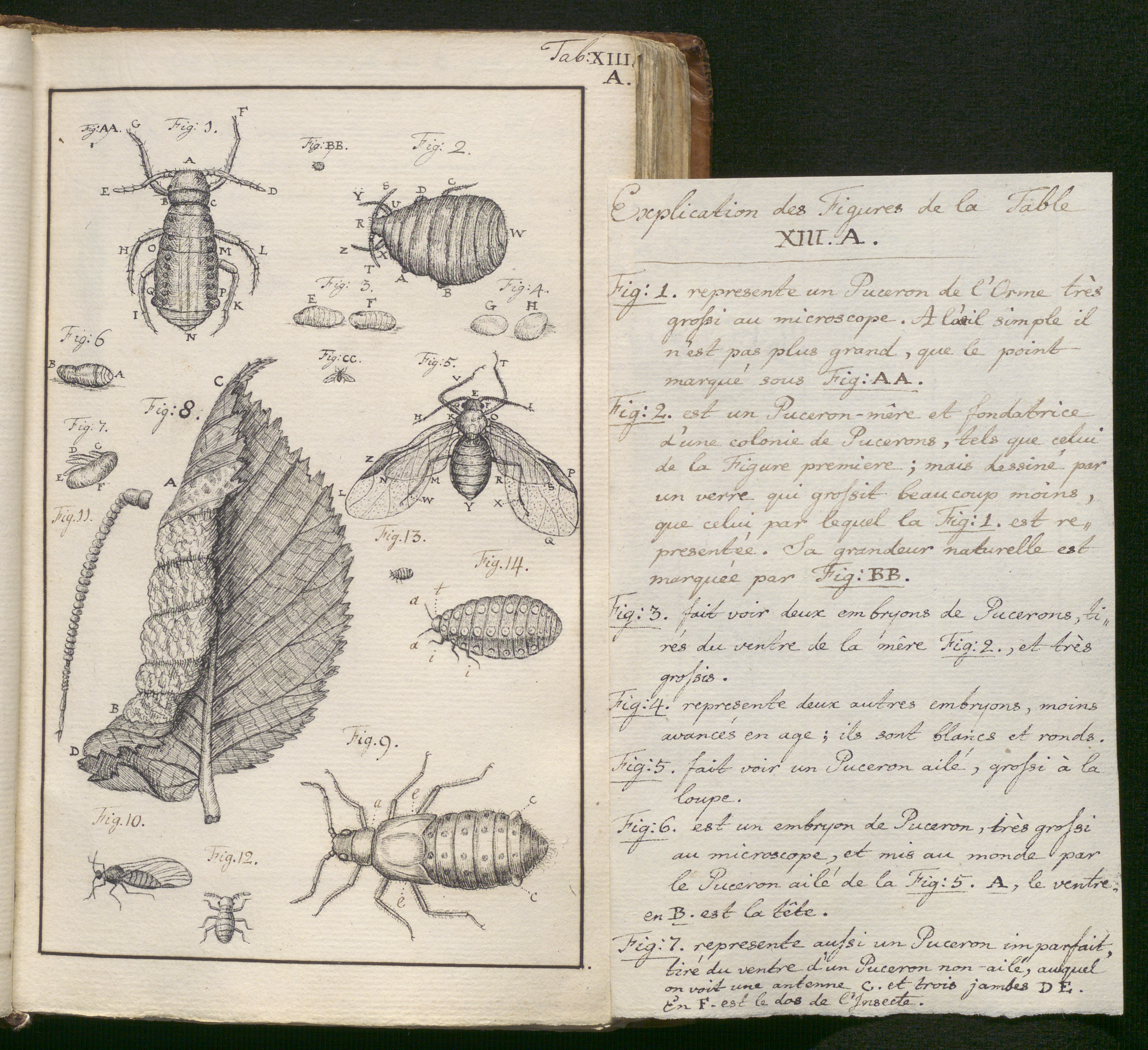
A page of original drawings by De Geer, complete with his notes, depicting aphids

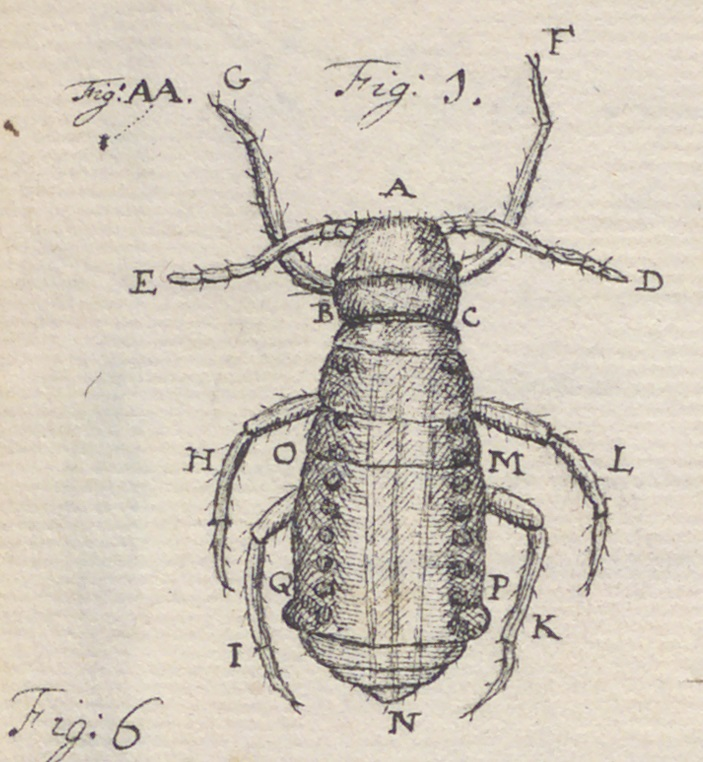
Detail of one of the drawings by De Geer

Charles De Geer made all the illustrations for his main work Mémoires pour servir a l'histoire des insectes himself. Pictured here are the preserved wooden boxes with the copper plates containing the final engravings; an example of a preparatory drawing by De Geer with his notes (depicting aphids); and a detail of one of his famously meticulous drawings.

=== Civic career, later life and death ===
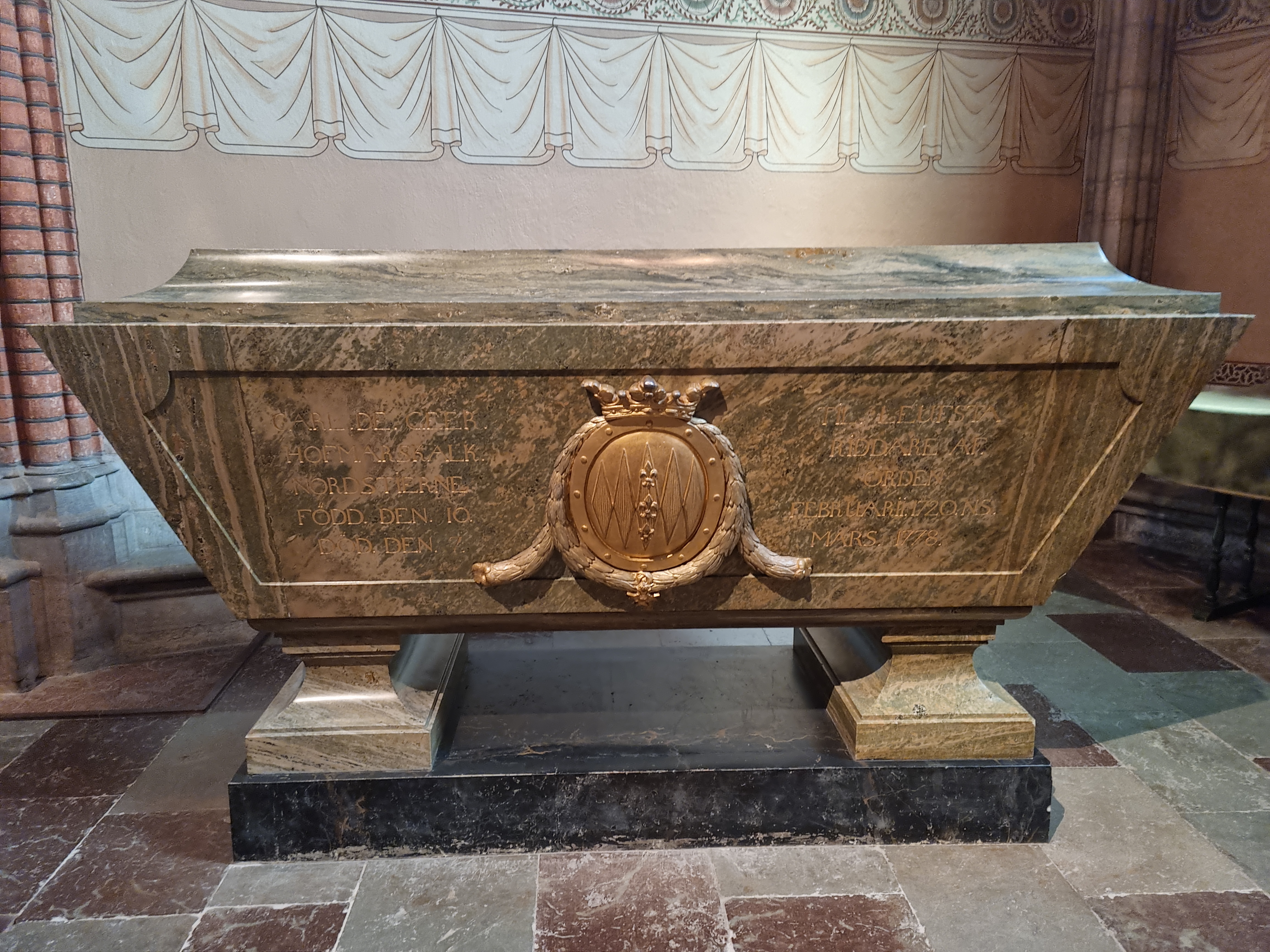
The tomb of Charles De Geer in Uppsala Cathedral

In public life, De Geer was present at every session of the Riksdag of the Estates (i.e., the parliament) between 1751 and 1772. Even so, his interest in politics appears to have been limited and he played no active role in the sessions. He held offices at the Royal Court: in 1740 he was appointed Chamberlain, and in 1760 Marshal of the Court. Charles De Geer was elevated to the rank of friherre (baron) in 1773. He received two royal orders: the rank of Knight of the Order of the Polar Star in 1761 and Commander Grand Cross of the Order of Vasa in 1772.

Soon after turning 50, he was beset by gout, which led to his death on 7 March 1778. He died in Stockholm. He is buried together with his wife in a chapel in Uppsala Cathedral. After his death, his collections of insects and birds were donated by De Geer's widow to the Royal Swedish Academy of Sciences. They were later incorporated into the collections of the Swedish Museum of Natural History.
