= Johann Gotthelf Lindner =

German university teacher and writer

- Born: 11 September 1729; Schmolsin, East Pomerania, Prussia
- Died: 29 March 1776 (aged 46); Königsberg, Prussia
- Occupations: Teacher; Theologian; Philosopher
- Parent: Georg Friedrich Lindner

Johann Gotthelf Lindner (11 September 1729 – 29 March 1776) was a German university teacher and writer at the time of the eighteenth century Enlightenment.

Johann Gotthelf Lindner was the elder brother to Ehregott Friedrich Lindner, also born in Schmolsin, and to Gottlob Immanuel Lindner (1734–1818), born in the city of Königsberg. He was therefore also an uncle to the journalist-doctor Friedrich Ludwig Lindner (1772–1845).

== Life ==
Lindner was born in the village of Schmolsin a short distance inland from the north coast of East Pomerania. His father, Georg Friedrich Lindner, was the local protestant minister.

He attended the Albertus University of Königsberg, where he studied protestant theology and philosophy, becoming a Master of Philosophy "Magister der Philosophie" in 1749 or 1750. He was soon giving lessons himself: subjects included the French language, oratory, history, philosophy and mathematics. He also took to exercising his skills as a preacher. He obtained a position as a teacher at the Cathedral School in Riga in 1753, becoming Rector and Inspector at the school in 1755. In 1765 he became a full professor of Poetry ("Dichtkunst") at Königsberg, and in 1766 he became director of the newly re-established German Society (Königsberg).

Lindner received a doctorate of theology in 1773 for a 47-page dissertation concerned with poetry in Holy Scripture. In 1775 he became a church and school inspector as well as a protestant minister in the Löbenicht parish of Königsberg.

As director of the German Society Lindner became an important member of Königsberg's close circle of Enlightenment philosophers. Other members included Johann Georg Hamann, Theodor Gottlieb von Hippel and Immanuel Kant. Lindner was also a member of the "Three Crowns Lodge" ("Freimaurerloge Zu den drei Kronen") of the city's Freemasons.

Lindner published his poetic writings in various journals including the weekly Rigische Anzeiger and Königsberg's Gelehrte und Politische Zeitung. He also produced school dramas.

== Publications ==
- Lehrbuch der schönen Wissenschaften, insbesondere der Prosa und Poesie, in 2 volumes
- Kurzer Inbegriff der Ästhetik, Redekunst und Dichtkunst. 2 volumes, 1771/1772.
- De eo, quod est poeticum in Sacra Scriptura. Dissertation 1773, 47 pages.
- Abhandlung von der Sprache überhaupt, und insbesondre eines Landes, nebst einer Sammlung einiger Liefländischen Provinzialwörter und Ausdrücke. In: Beitrag zu Schulhandlungen. Königsberg 1762, pp. 207–256.
