= Siege of Bergen op Zoom (1747) =

Part of the Austrian War of Succession

- Part of the War of the Austrian Succession
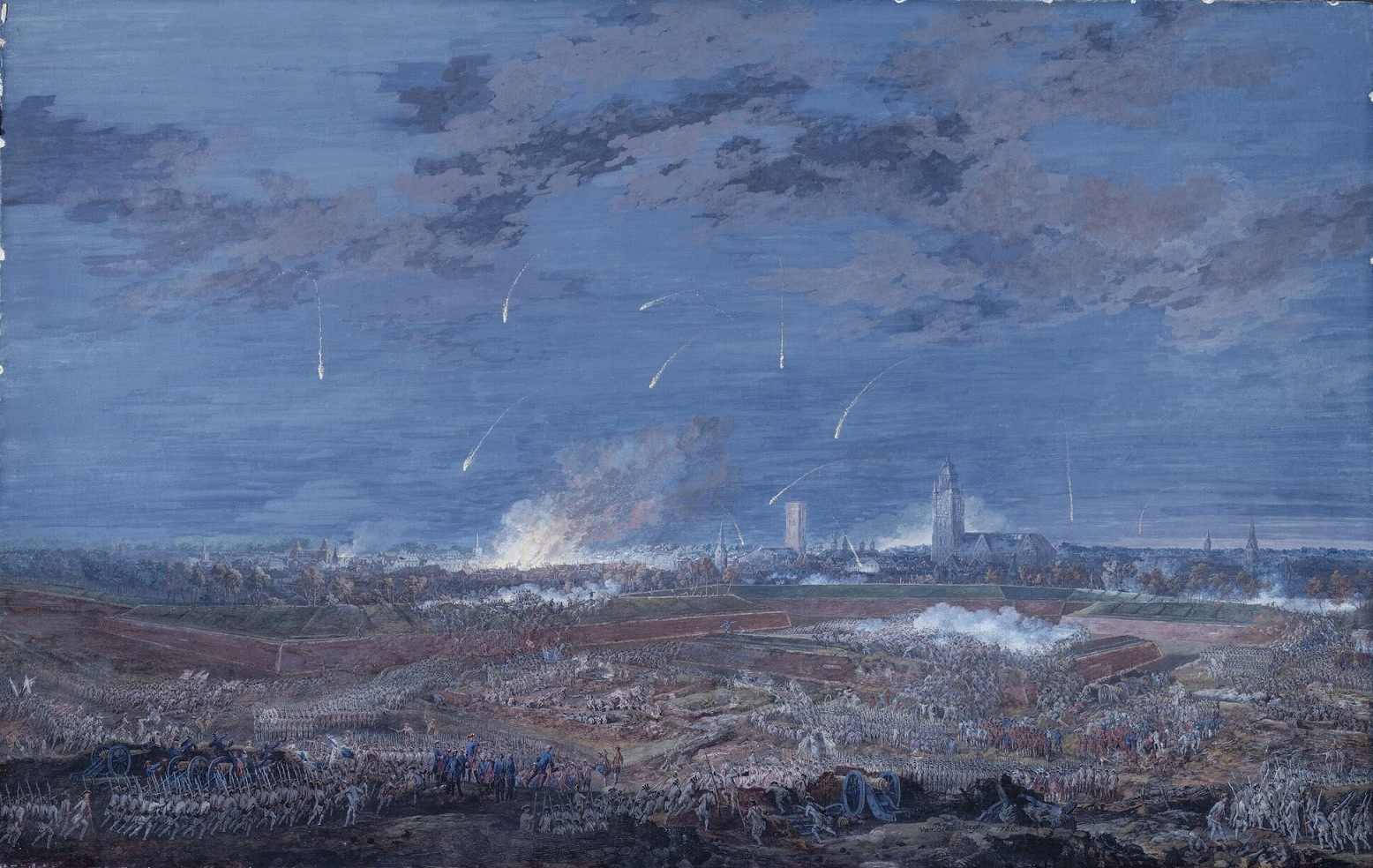
- The assault on Bergen op Zoom
Date	July – September 25th 1747
Location	Bergen op Zoom, Dutch Republic
Result	French victory

Belligerents
Dutch Republic; Great Britain	France

Commanders and leaders
(Dutch Republic) Isaac Cronström	(Kingdom of France) Count Löwendal

Strength
~10,000	~30,000–35,000 (by rotation)

Casualties and losses
5,000–6,000; 292 pieces of cannon and 17 supply ships captured	10,000–20,000

The siege of Bergen op Zoom took place during the Austrian War of Succession, when a French army, under the command of Count Löwendal and the overall direction of Marshal Maurice de Saxe, laid siege and captured the strategic Dutch border fortress of Bergen op Zoom on the border of Brabant and Zeeland in 1747. The fortress was defended by Dutch, Austrians, British, Hanoverians and Hessians that supported the Pragmatic Sanction.

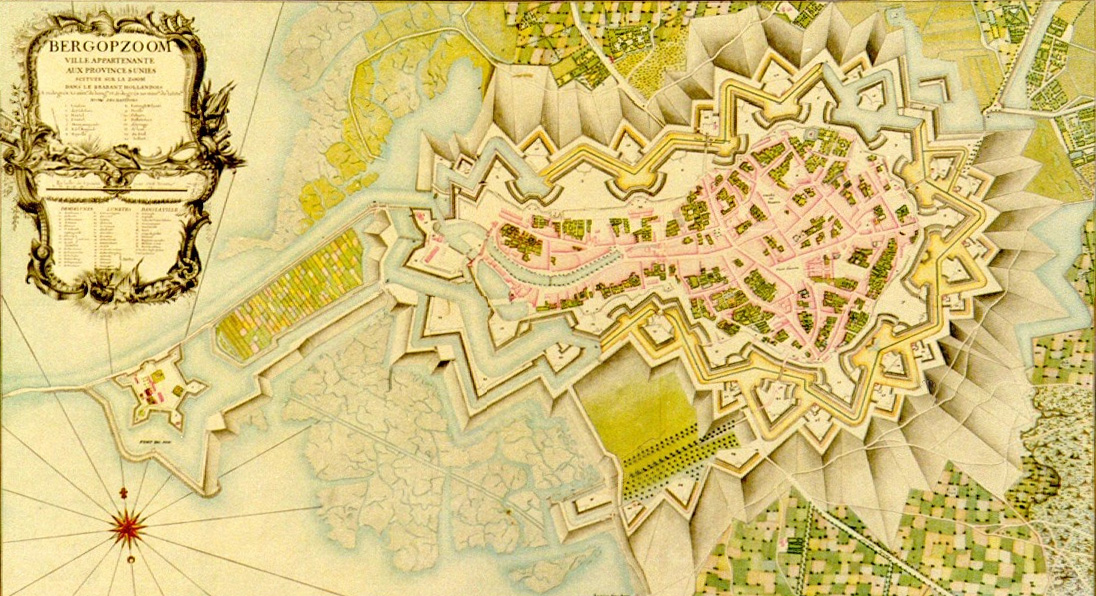
Bergen op Zoom in 1747

After seven years of brutal war, both sides in this conflict were suffering from weariness of the war. Although tentative peace initiatives had been put forward, neither side was yet willing to make meaningful concessions. The capture of Bergen op Zoom would be a signal defeat for the Dutch and would open the door for an invasion of the Dutch Netherlands. The siege was the center of attention in Europe and news of it followed eagerly in numerous reports with the Pragmatic Allies confident that the fortress would withstand the French and the French determined it should fall.

== Preliminary maneuvers ==
Example of 2 bastions

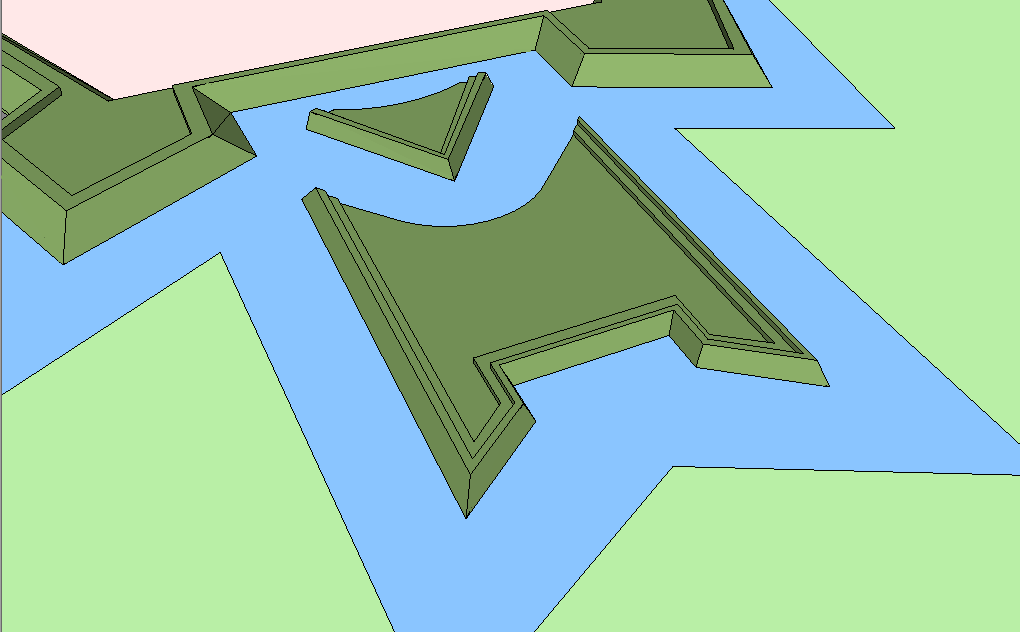
Example of a hornwork

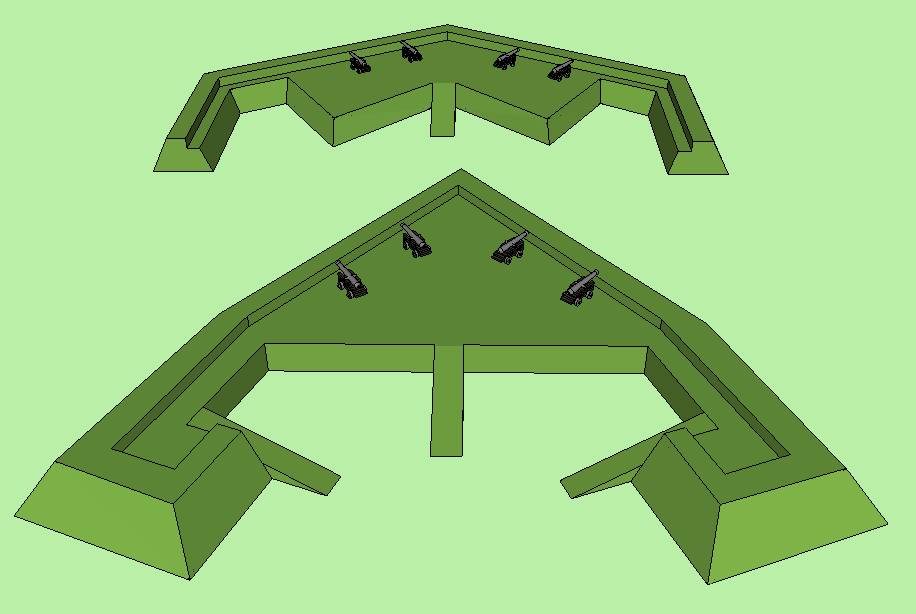
Example of 2 kinds of lunettes

Following his victory at the Battle of Lauffeld, the French Marshal de Saxe detached a force 30,000 strong under the command of General von Lowendal, a master in the art of siege craft, to lay siege to Bergen op Zoom. Saxe calculated that his numerically inferior opponents would not be able to adequately defend two fortified cities at once. Needing to protect Maastricht from the threat posed by De Saxe's forces, neither the British commander, the Duke of Cumberland, nor the Austrian commander, Batthyány, felt able to move to support Bergen op Zoom. For the Dutch this proved the unwillingness of her allies to assist them in their time of need, while their British allies felt the Dutch demands for greater allied effort in this war was absurd - reasoning that the Dutch had not formally declared war on France.

Bergen op Zoom was a fortress town with a population of some 5,000 people and an initial garrison of 3,000 under the command of the 86-year-old, vigorous Governor General Cronström. The circumference of the fortress ramparts was about three miles with ten bastions covered by five hornworks. The intervals contain twenty one ravelins which are covered by stone lunettes. Much of the surrounding country was marshland. Additionally, an entrenched camp at Roosendaal, defended by three forts: Moermont, Pinsen, Rovers, and trench lines connecting to the city on the northeast, were held by the Prince of Hildburghausen with 20 battalions of infantry and 14 squadrons of cavalry that could reinforce or relieve the garrison. Because of these lines and some lesser lines to the west, Bergen op Zoom could not be completely invested, or surrounded. Further, because of the low-lying ground, large areas fronting the defenses were inundated by the Dutch using various sluices and channels and this prevented any French approach in those parts of the field. The fortress was the chief work of the great Dutch engineer, Menno van Coehoorn. It was believed to be impregnable and was considered the strongest fortification in Dutch Brabant. Bergen op Zoom had withstood two previous sieges, the first in 1588 and a second in 1622. It could be supplied with munitions and provision by boats using two navigable canals each defended by its own fort.

Bergen op Zoom was well-garrisoned and well-supplied, so the siege by French forces did not cause immediate alarm in the Netherlands. The fortress had access to the sea, and the Dutch navy supplied the fortress without serious interference by the French. The French, since they were the besieging force and controlled much of the surrounding area, were also well-supplied and reinforced. However, the allies had an army under Prince Waldeck nearby which posed a continuing threat to French supply lines.

== Siege ==
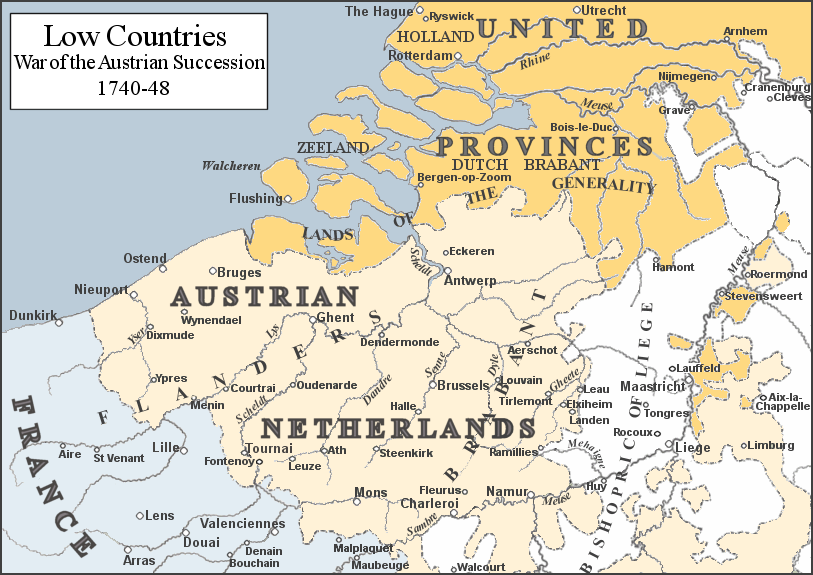
Low Countries: War of the Austrian Succession. Bergen op Zoom is in the upper center.

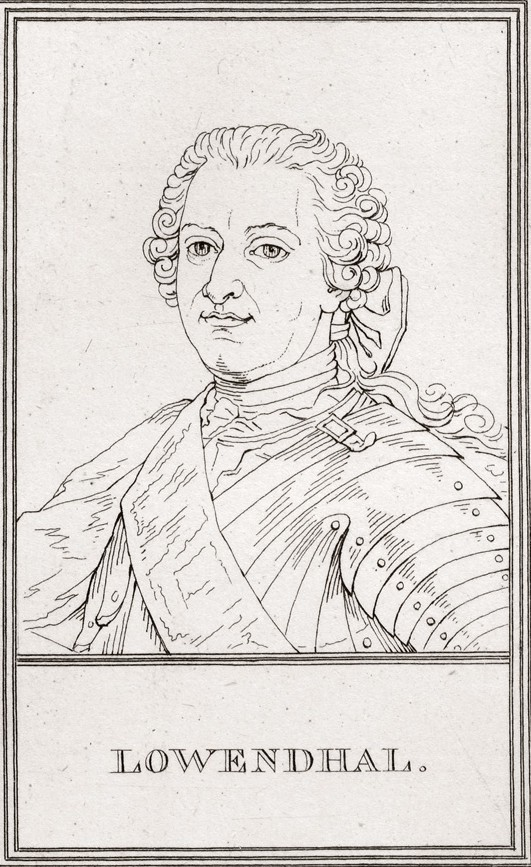
Ulrich Frédéric Woldemar, Count of Lowendal

The various bastions, ravelins and lunettes of the fortification were all named and would mount over 230 cannon and mortars during the course of the siege. The principal effort of the French concentrated on the bastions Coehoorn and Pucelle. Facing the French trench lines, the sides of Coehoorn were flanked on its right by the ravelin Antwerpen and on its left the ravelin Diden. Between the bastion and Antwerpen was the lunette Holland and between the bastion and Diden was the lunette Zealand. To the left of Diden was the lunette, Utrecht, and left of that the bastion Pucelle. The area between the bastions of Coehoorn and Pucelle was chosen partly because the ground was drier and partly because this was the only part of the fortress not directly covered by additional lines as was the northwest and south east sides of Bergen op Zoom. This area would witness the most continuous and fierce combat of the siege.

=== Laying the parallels ===
On the night of the 14 July the French opened the trenches using 2,400 workers supported by 10 companies of grenadiers and 5 battalions of infantry. Lowendal used 12,000 of his troops to man the trench lines and deployed the other 18,000 as an army of observation. The first parallel was laid overnight of the first day, 400 paces out from the fortifications. On 17 July the second parallel was dug and over the night of 22 July the third parallel was completed. Batteries were raised and the French artillery began to bombard the defenders on the 20 July. Each of the trench parallels were laid and their saps pushed forward by the French, drawing ever closer to the fortress. The fourth parallel was finished between 26 and 28 July and a fifth laid up against the works on 8 September.

Various stormattacks followed on the outer works of the fortress, but the defences held firm. The French had also dug mines under the redoubts, ravelins and lunettes to blow them up. They were in their turn countermined by Dutch sappers. On 25 July Loudon's Highlanders, also known as the 64th Foot, made a sally from Fort Rover which took and destroyed a major French battery. Over the course of the siege, other British troops, engineers and artillery joined the allied garrison as well as some Austrian miners.

After a month of fighting the French made a lodgement in the covered way. Unfortunately for the French, the Dutch still possessed several lunettes in the area, which were used to bombard the French held covered way. The lunette, Zealand, was held by a battalion of Hessian allies. Using mines, stormattacks and continuous bombarding the French drove the Dutch out of these lunettes. The 75 mines sprung, 43 by the Dutch and 32 by the French, between the bastions Coehoorn and Pucelle exemplify the intensity of these operations around the covered way. After two months of intense fighting French were finally able to bombard the main wall. Saxe sent Lowendal 12,000 reinforcements to make up for serious losses, while the garrison received reinforcement and relief from troops within the lines of the fortified camp.

On 8 August the allied army, formerly under Waldeck but now commanded by Prince Schwartzenberg, in conjunction with the corps of Hildburghausen, made a badly coordinated and poorly executed night attack on the French in an attempt to break the siege. Even so, the allies were repelled with difficulty and Schwartzenberg continued to harass and intercept French supply convoys taking a convoy on 14 August.

=== Storming the breaches ===
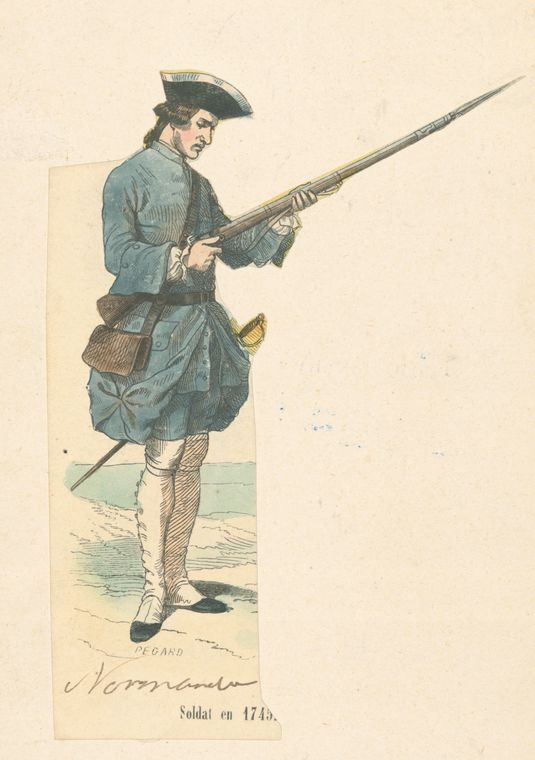
French soldier of the Régiment de Normandie 1740s

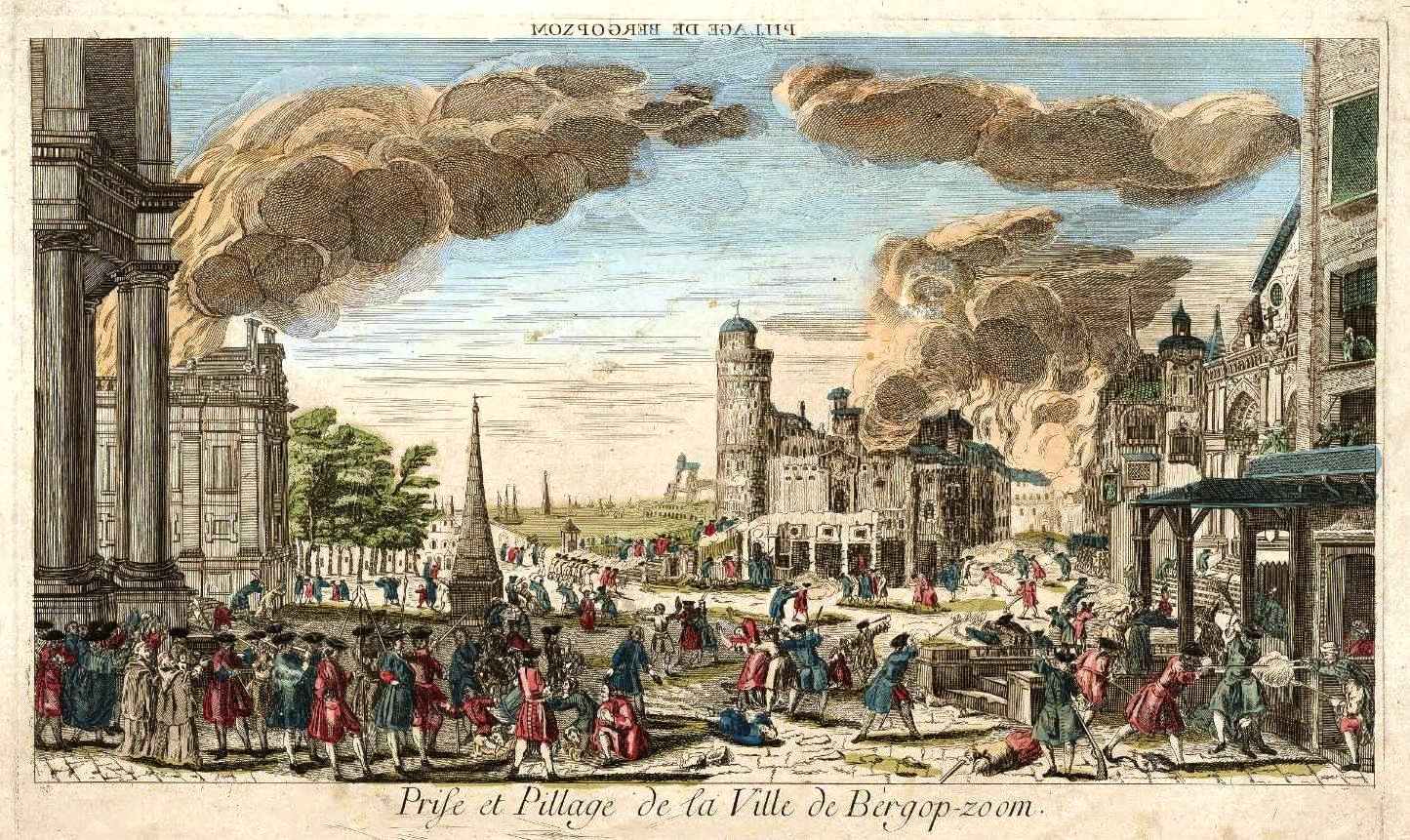
Taking and looting of the fortress of Bergen-op-Zoom

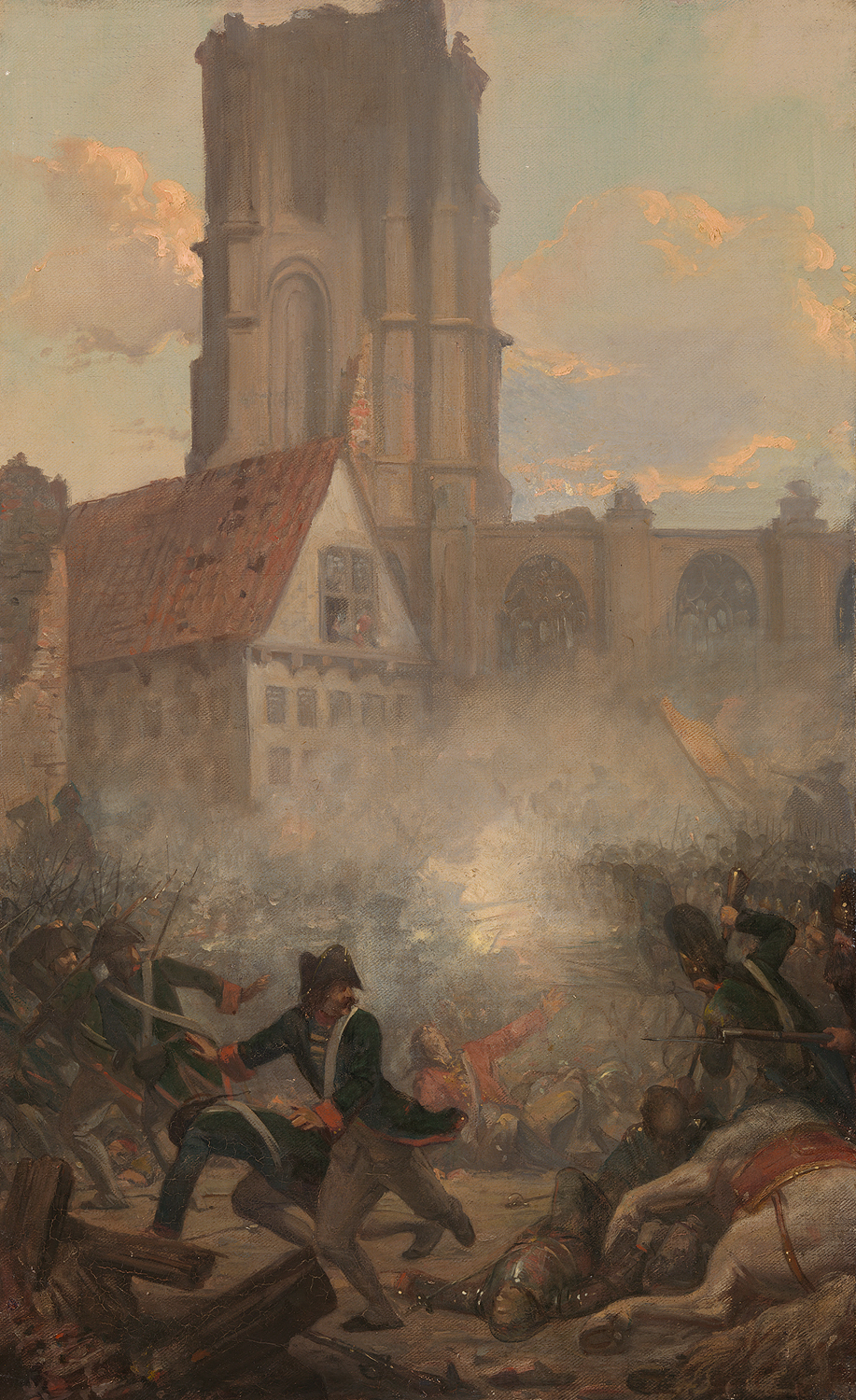
The fall of Bergen op Zoom

Lowendal felt an urgency to take the town because autumn rains were coming. The rains would cause certain failure of the siege. Lowendal, advised that several breaches in the defensive fortification were practicable, stormed the city in a coup de main attack on the early morning of 18 September 1747. The Dutch commanders did not perceive the breaches as practicable and had taken no particular cautionary measures. The city garrison consisted of nine battalions: two Scots battalions, Colyear and Majoribanks; Waldeck and Saxe-Gotha, Lewe, Evertsen, Holstein-Gottorp, Deutz and van Rechteren.

French columns accompanied by laborers to clear any obstacles were prepared for each breach. In the center were 14 companies of grenadiers supported by 13 battalions of the main body of infantry. On the French left the bastion Coehoorn would be assaulted by 6 companies of grenadiers and 6 battalions. On the right, 7 companies of grenadiers from the regiments of d'Eu, Coincy, Chabrillant, la Trasne and 50 dismounted Royal dragoons would assault the bastion Pucelle supported by the first battalions of the regiments of Normandie, Montboissier and d'Eu followed by 3 brigades of sappers, 20 gunners, 300 workers. In addition the first battalions of the regiments Montmorin, Royal de Vaisseaux and Beauvoisis would march in support of the attack. The Enfants Perdus, or Forlorn Hope, consisted of 200 volunteers, 2 companies of grenadiers supported by a battalion of infantry and were destined to attack Diden, the half-moon, or ravelin.

At 4 a.m. a brief signal bombardment of the ravelin was made and a contingent of French Grenadiers gained the fosse, penetrated the breaches and then opened a sallyport which allowed the rest of the troops inside where they formed up in the gorge of the ravelin and then gained the ramparts without opposition. The French then seized the gates and entered the city sword in hand. The garrison commander, Cronström, and his officers had reportedly still been asleep in their beds when most of the officers were captured by the French. The brigade of Loudon's Highlanders put up a tenacious defense against the French through the streets of the city, making a stand in the market place losing two-thirds their number but enabling Governor Cronström to escape. The Dutch and their allies suffered some 3,000 casualties during the storm and the sack while French losses were only 479. Some 200 fortress guns were captured and 17 fully loaded supply ships in the port were taken. After the fall of the town, the garrisons of the forts of Rovers, Pinsen, Moermant, and Kijk-in-de-Pot in the lines outside the city were either taken by assault or surrendered.

Following the coup de main, the French soldiers lost their discipline and sacked the town and, although the sack ended quickly, several thousand civilians were reportedly killed or injured. Lowendal declared his regrets but European opinion was outraged. Saxe defended Lowendal to Louis XV saying, "There is no middle course, either you must hang him or make him a Marshal of France."

== Aftermath ==
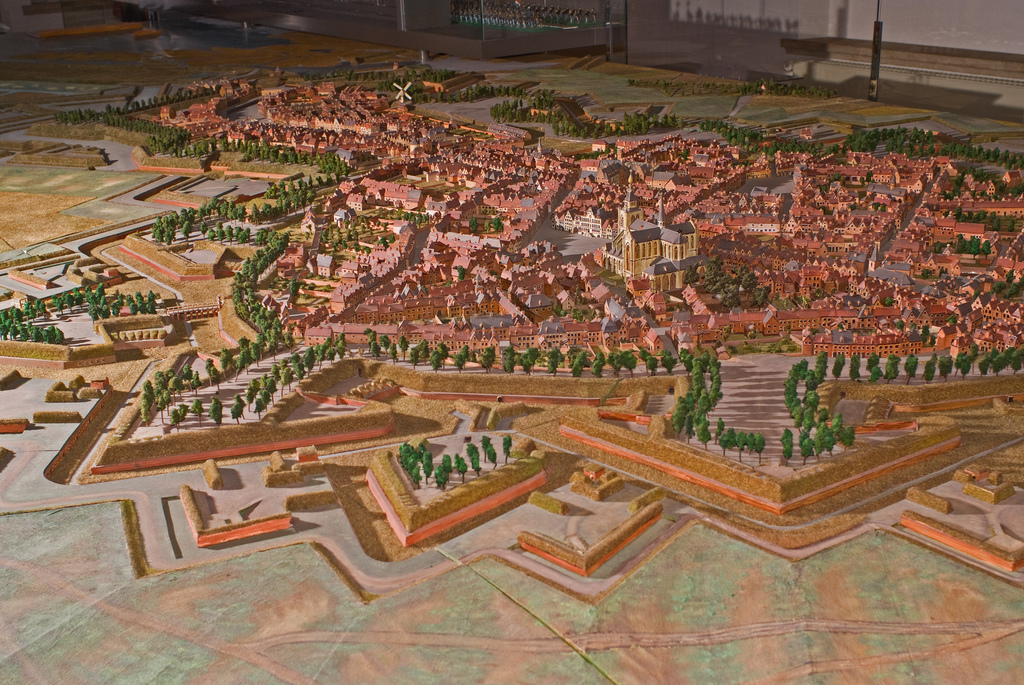
Model of Bergen op Zoom in 1747

The siege had been the longest and bloodiest siege of the war. With the capture of Bergen op Zoom however, the French now had control of the entire length of the river Scheldt. The defeat caused a rift between the Dutch and British governments. It now dawned on the British that they had demanded too much of the military capability of the Dutch Republic and that its ability to resist the French had been exhausted. The Dutch on the other hand were furious about the fact that her allies were unwilling to relieve the city. The city was key to opening up the Dutch Republic and Hanover to a potential French invasion. Lowendal was made a Marshal of France for his exploit. Along with the defeat at Lauffeld, the defeat at Bergen op Zoom forced the British to re-enter negotiations, and to take seriously the ongoing talks at the Congress of Breda, leading to a treaty in 1748. A widely read account of the siege and assault was published by Jacob von Eggers, who participated as a volunteer observer on the French side.

== Bibliography ==
- Browne, James. A history of the Highlands and of the Highland clans, Vol. 4, Glasgow, 1840.
- Browning, Reed. The War of the Austrian Succession. St. Martin's Griffin, 2008, ISBN 0-312-12561-5.
- Cust, Edward. Annals of the wars of the eighteenth century, Vol.II, London, 1858.
- Lodge, Sir Richard. Studies in Eighteenth Century diplomacy 1740–48. John Murray, 1930.
- Nimwegen, O. van De Republiek der Verenigde Nederlanden als grote mogendheid. (1740–1748). Amsterdam, 2002, ISBN 90-6707-540-X
- Rodger, N.A.M. The Insatiable Earl: A Life of John Montagu, Fourth Earl of Sandwich, 1718–1792. HarperCollins, 1993, ISBN 0-393-03587-5.
- Simms, Brendan. Three Victories and a Defeat: The Rise and Fall of the First British Empire. Penguin Books, 2008, ISBN 0-465-01332-5.
- Skrine, Francis Henry. Fontenoy and Great Britain's Share in the War of the Austrian Succession 1741–48. London, Edinburgh, 1906.
- An authentick and accurate journal of the siege of Bergen-op-Zoom by an English Volunteer. London, 1747.
- The Gentleman's Magazine, Vol. 17, September, 1747. London, 1747.
- d' Espagnac, Jean-Baptiste-Joseph Damarzit de Sahuguet. Histoire de Maurice, comte de Saxe, duc de Courlande et de Semigalle, Volume 2, Paris, MDCCLXXV.
- Wittje, G.. Die wichtigsten Schlachten, Belagerungen und verschanzten Lager vom Jahre 1708 bis 1855. Leipzig und Heidelberg, 1861.
- Van Alphen, Marc; Hoffenaar, Jan; Lemmers, Alan; Van der Spek, Christiaan (2019). Krijgsmacht en Handelsgeest: Om het machtsevenwicht in Europa. Boom. ISBN 978-90-244-3038-3.
- Van Nimwegen, Olaf (2002). De Republiek der Verenigde Nederlanden als grote mogendheid: Buitenlandse politiek en oorlogvoering in de eerste helft van de achttiende eeuw en in het bijzonder tijdens de Oostenrijkse Successieoorlog (1740–1748) (in Dutch). De Bataafsche Leeuw. ISBN 978-9067075404. OCLC 1342236833.
- Bodart, Gaston (1908). Militar-Historisches Kreigs-Lexikon V1: 1618-1905 (in German) (2010 ed.). Kessinger Publishing. ISBN 978-1167991554.
