= Nicholas Joseph Balthazar de l'Anglade =

Nicholas Joseph Balthazar de Langlade, vicomte du Chayla, baron de Montauroux et Chambon, seigneur de Champs (c. 1685 – 17 December 1754, Paris), was a French general. He was a lieutenant general of the king's armies and director general of the cavalry. In 1708 he was made a knight of the royal and military Order of Saint Louis. On 2 February 1746 he was made a knight of the Order of the Holy Spirit. He commanded the French force at the Battle of Melle.

== Sources ==
- Nicolas Viton de Saint-Allais, Nobiliaire universel de France ou Recueil général des généalogies historiques des maisons nobles, vol. 8, 1816 Langlade du Chayla de Montgros
- Gustave de Burdin, Documents historiques sur la province de Gévaudan, vol. 1, 1846
