= Jacob von Eggers =

Military engineer (1704–1773)

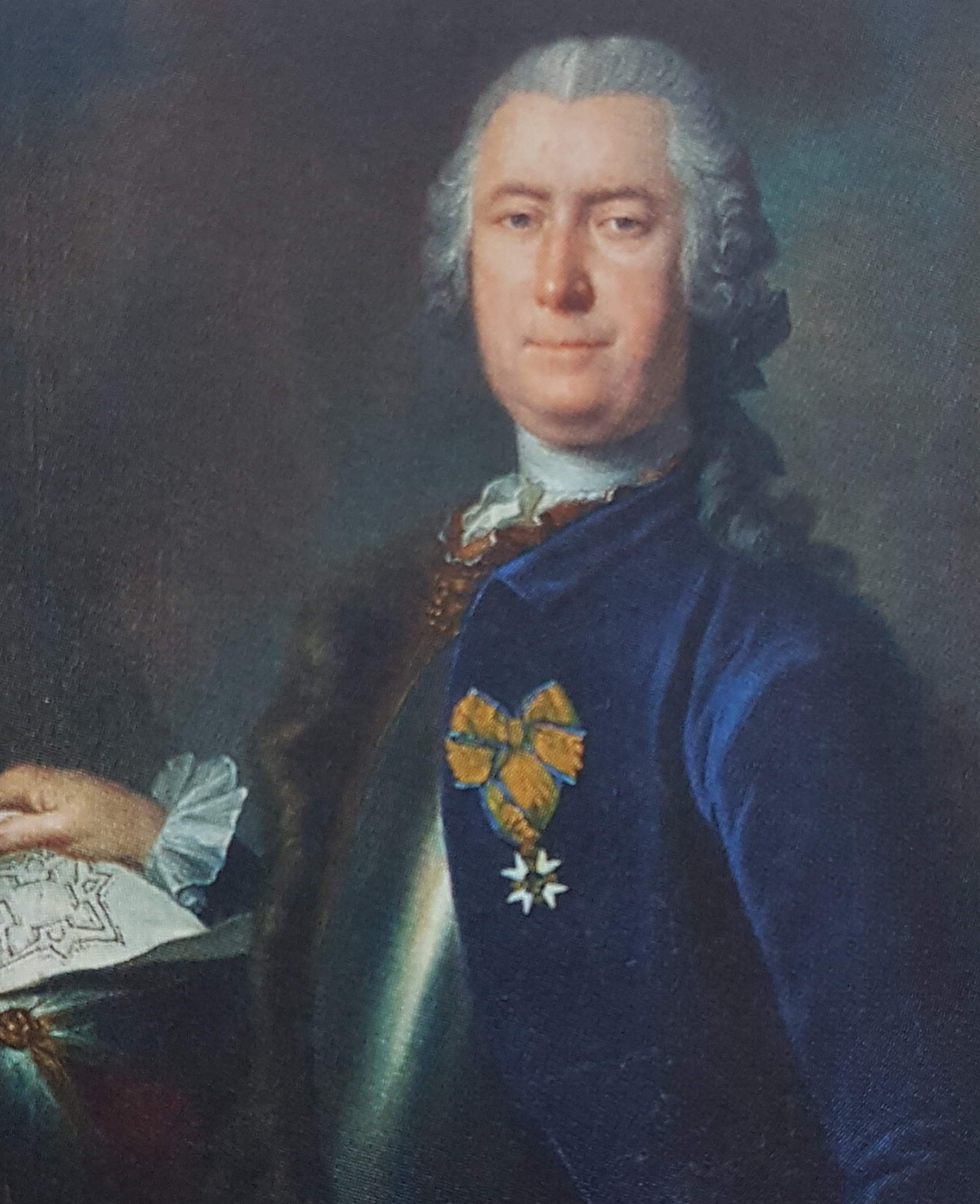
Portrait of Jacob von Eggers by Jacob Wessel

Jacob von Eggers (before 1772 Jacob Eggers; 14 December 1704 – 12 January 1773) was a military engineer and Swedish friherre (baron). He was born in a German-speaking family in present-day Tartu, then known as Dorpat, in Russian-occupied Swedish Livonia, during the Great Northern War. Around the age of four he was deported together with his mother to Russia, where in 1713 she remarried a Swedish baron who was a prisoner of war there. After the war, the family moved to Sweden where Jacob pursued studies in fortification. He became an officer in the Swedish military in 1729. Following his stepfather's death in 1733, he sought opportunities to further his career abroad as well as in Sweden. In 1734 he accompanied the troops of Stanisław Leszczyński during the War of the Polish Succession and participated in the siege of Danzig (modern-day Gdańsk). He then spent some time as a volunteer in imperial, Saxon and French service, as well as making study trips around Europe. From 1737 he formed a more lasting link with the Electorate of Saxony, and was formally employed both by the Swedish and Saxon militaries until 1758.

He participated in several campaigns during these years, and wrote an appreciated account of the French siege and capture of Bergen op Zoom in 1747. He went on to further edit and expand a French military dictionary, and provide an influential and expanded German translation of the same work. He was furthermore entrusted with the military education of the Saxon princes Charles and Xavier. He was promoted in both Swedish and Saxon service, ending the latter with the rank of major general in 1757. In Sweden, he was elevated to the rank of friherre or baron, awarded the Order of the Sword and elected a member of the Royal Swedish Academy of Sciences. In 1758 Jacob von Eggers however left both Swedish and Saxon service and settled in Gdańsk, where he would spend the rest of his life as commander of the city's fortifications. He kept in contact with the Swedish academy, and donated his extensive library to it. He died in 1773.

== Biography ==
=== Early life ===
Jacob von Eggers was born in present-day Tartu, then known as Dorpat, in the middle of the Great Northern War. The city was then part of Swedish Livonia, but just a few months before his birth the city had surrendered, after a long siege, to Russian troops and thus came under Russian occupation. He came from a Baltic German family; his father was a baker originally from Holstein, and was killed in an armed robbery before the birth of Jacob. His mother, née Sophia Margaretha Krüger, was the daughter of an alderman in the guild of bakers in Tartu. Around the age of four Jacob and his mother, together with the entire German-speaking population of Tartu, were deported to Arkhangelsk. He attended a school set up for deported Swedish citizens in Archangelsk by pietist Swedish officers. Subsequently, Jacob and his mother were moved between different localities in Russia. While in Veliky Ustyug in 1713, his mother remarried a Swedish officer in Russian captivity, friherre (baron) Captain Knut Gustaf Sparre, who thus became Jacob's stepfather. Jacob could pursue further studies among the captive Swedish officers in Veliky Ustyug, who taught him Latin, French, Italian, mathematics and music, though he would later describe his studies in these subjects as haphazard. He also learnt Russian in captivity.

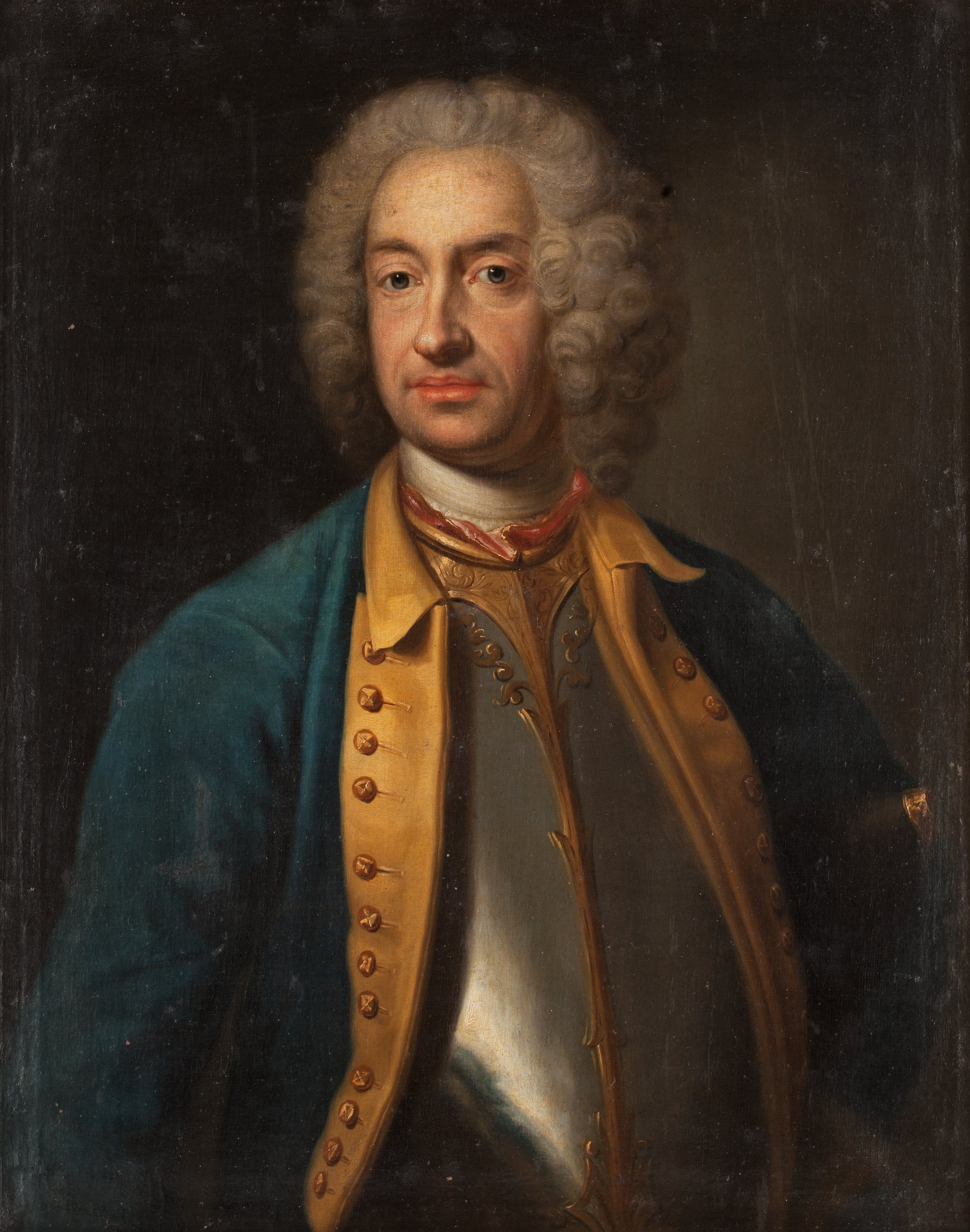
Jacob's stepfather Knut Gustaf Sparre. Portrait by Johan Henrik Scheffel.

Following the Peace of Nystad in 1721, Jacob followed his mother and stepfather to Sweden, where Jacob soon began studies in fortification. He spent a few years in the Royal Swedish Regiment in France, in order to widen his knowledge abroad, and made a study trip to the Dutch Republic to see the fortifications of Menno van Coehoorn. After his return to Sweden in 1729 he became an officer in the Swedish military, in the predecessor of today's Swedish Fortifications Agency, and worked at the construction of the fortification of Fredriksborgs fästning outside Stockholm.

=== An itinerant career ===
Jacob von Eggers's stepfather died in 1733, and in 1734 Jacob left Sweden and enrolled with the troops of Stanisław Leszczyński, who was attempting to regain the Kingdom of Poland and Grand Duchy of Lithuania. In the ensuing War of the Polish Succession, Jacob von Eggers fought on the side of Leszczyński, was promoted to the rank of captain, and participated in the siege of Danzig (modern-day Gdańsk). Following the failed campaign, he was commissioned by the King Frederick I of Sweden, who was equally Landgrave of Hesse-Kassel, to inspect and improve the fortifications of Rheinfels Castle. He then spent two years accompanying the Swedish Count Adam Horn af Ekebyholm on travels to Vienna and Venice, after which he in 1737 spent time as a volunteer in imperial service, fighting in Hungary and Serbia during the Austrian campaign against the Ottoman Empire with field marshal Friedrich Heinrich von Seckendorff. During this time he made connections with officers in service of the Electorate of Saxony, and in June 1737 he joined them, becoming an appreciated member of the court of the Elector in Dresden. Together with a Count from Saxony, Jacob von Eggers undertook another study trip to Provence, Savoy, Milan and Rome. Upon his return he was promoted to the equivalent rank of major in the corps of engineers of the Elector, and almost simultaneously to captain in the Swedish military. He would remain in dual service of both Sweden and the Electorate of Saxony until 1758, which was an unusual arrangement.

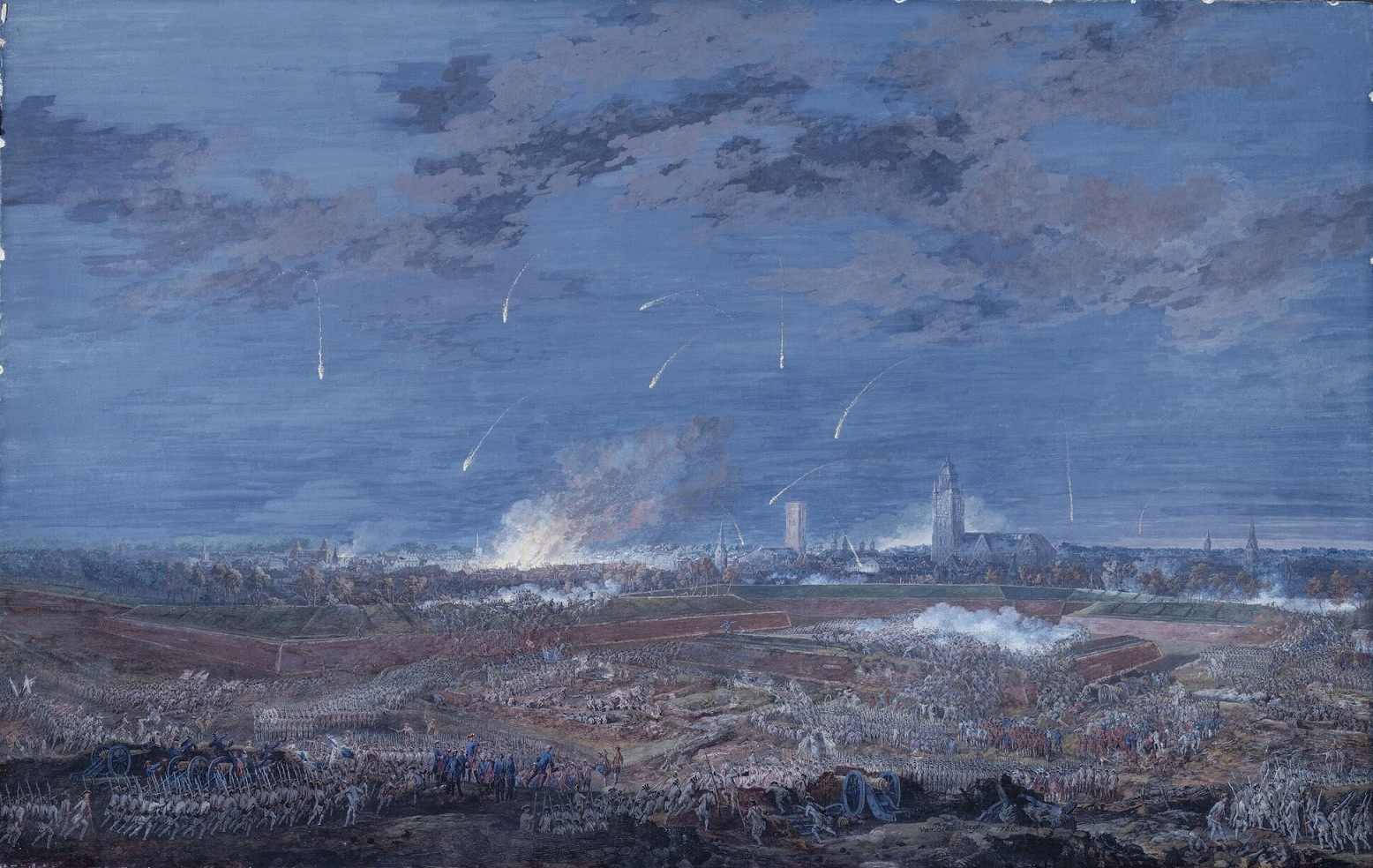
The assault on Bergen op Zoom in 1747. Jacob von Eggers wrote an account of the siege and fall of the fortress which received much attention.

He furthermore participated in the War of the Austrian Succession in Saxon service. He built field fortifications so the army could cross rivers safely during the campaign in Bohemia in 1741. However, he returned to Sweden at the outbreak of the Russo-Swedish War of 1741–1743, was initially stationed in Porvoo but later served as adjutant general to Gustaf Fredrik von Rosen (1688–1769). In 1744 he was back in Saxony and re-joined the Saxon forces, first in the campaign in Brabant, and later in the general staff of Saxoni forces in Bohemia. In 1745 he was briefly taken prisoner by Prussian forces. After the end of the war, he spent the following years of peace alternating between Dresden and Stockholm. In the spring of 1747 he issued an opinion on the plans to fortify Landskrona drawn up by Augustin Ehrensvärd. Later in the same year, he again engaged in the still ongoing War of the Austrian Succession, but this time as a volunteer on the French side and as a kind of observer. In this role, he experienced the French siege and capture of Bergen op Zoom in the Dutch Republic. His account of the fall of the fortress, which had been considered almost impenetrable, received much attention when it was published in 1750.

=== Later years ===
In 1747 Jacob von Eggers had been entrusted with tutoring the Saxon princes Charles and Xavier in military science, and was promoted to head of Saxon corps of engineers. He was promoted to the rank of colonel in 1749 in gratitude for his services to the court. In these years he also edited and in 1751 published a heavily revised and expanded edition of a military dictionary in French, originally published by François-Alexandre Aubert de La Chesnaye Des Bois. He returned to active duty with the outbreak of the Seven Years' War in 1756. He was stationed at the Königstein Fortress when the Saxon army capitulated, and would spend most of the time as vice commander of the fortress, largely in inactivity. During this period he found time to translate and further expand on a German edition of the military dictionary, and published it in Dresden in 1775 with the title Neues Kriegs- Ingenieur- Artillerie- See- und Ritter-Lexicon. It would have an impact as conveyor of new ideas and attitudes to a German audience.

His achievements were also increasingly recognised in Sweden. He was awarded the Order of the Sword with the rank of Knight in 1748 (raised to Commander in 1769), was ennobled in 1751 and elected member of the Royal Swedish Academy of Sciences in the same year. A rapid succession of promotions in military rank also followed, and in 1755 he was posted to Stralsund with the rank of colonel. In 1757, the head of the Swedish corps of fortification Gabriel Cronstedt died, and Jacob von Eggers applied for the position. When he was turned down, he retired from Swedish service and found employment instead as the commander of fortifications of the city of Gdańsk. At the same time he also retired from Saxon service, elevated to the rank of major general at his departure. He would spend the rest of his life in Gdańsk and died there in 1773.

He kept in close contact with the Royal Swedish Academy of Sciences, and was elevated to the rank of Swedish friherre in 1772. He amassed a significant library, consisting not only of works on military matters but also on natural history, mathematics, and technical literature. He later donated his library to the Royal Swedish Academy of Sciences, and also presented a collection of fortress models and maps to King Gustav III.

== Legacy ==
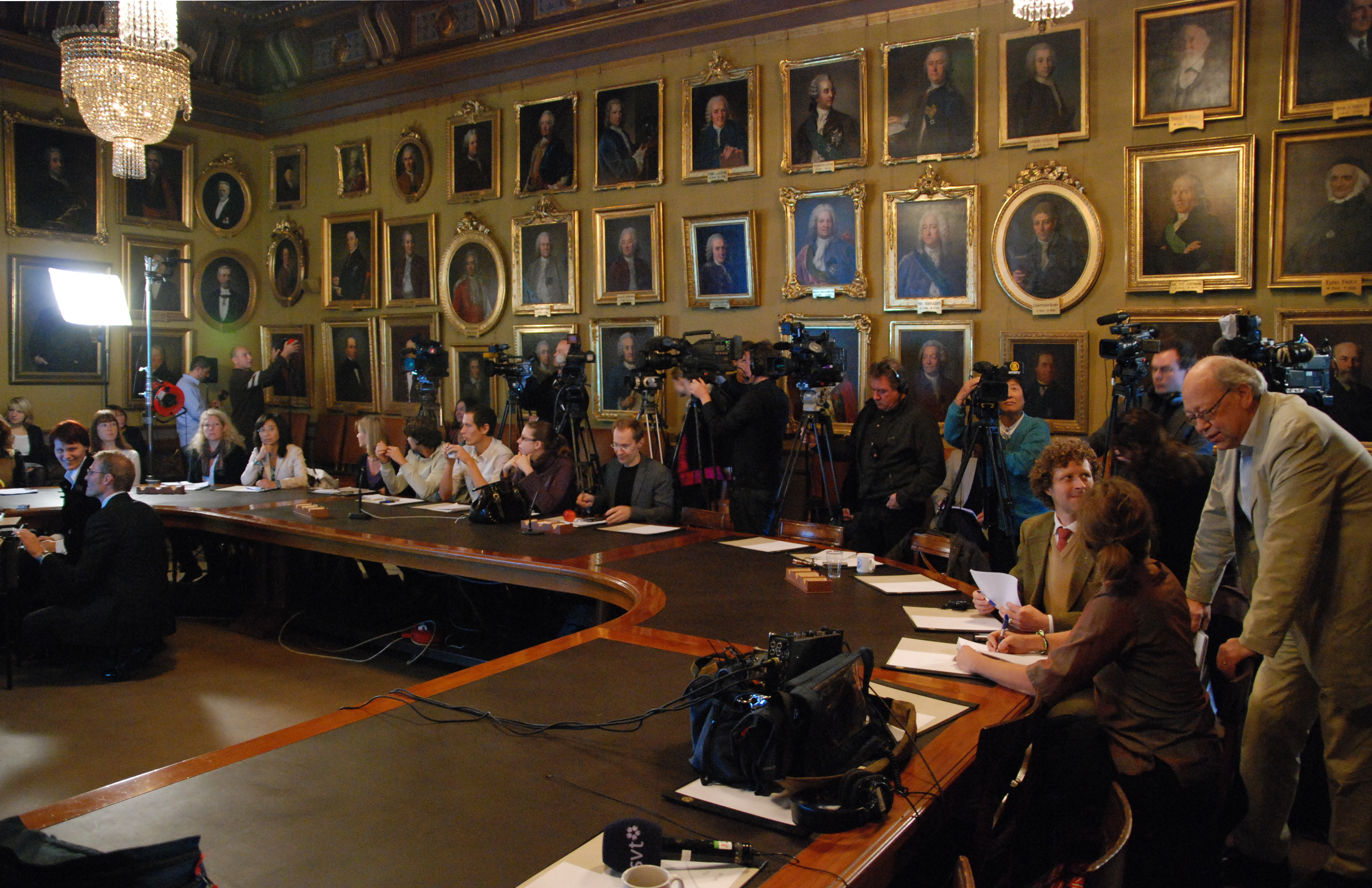
Announcement of the Nobel Prize in Chemistry in the Royal Swedish Academy of Sciences in 2008. The portrait of Eggers, who was a member of the academy and donated his library to it, is the fourth on top from the right.

Jacob von Eggers has generally been appraised as a skilful officer. Gustaf Elgenstierna noted the fact that he was entrusted the education of two princes, and equally that he took frequent part in both Swedish and other campaigns. Historian Bengt Hildebrand called Eggers "one of Europe's foremost military theoreticians" of his time, and emphasised his cosmopolitan career. His combination of concrete experience in the field and theoretical knowledge, as well as his pan-European field of activity, has also been underlined in other biographical overviews. German military historian Daniel Hohrath has emphasised the importance of the German edition of his military dictionary, and writes in connection with this that "Eggers' lexicon documents the state of military affairs in Europe at the beginning of the Seven Years' War in a precise and comprehensive manner. It also marks the transition from the baroque-rationalist 'art of war' of the early 18th century to the 'science of war' of the second half of the century brought about by the Enlightenment. Last but not least, with the person of Jacob von Eggers, it recalls one of the now forgotten intellectual officers of that era who, with their belief in reason and science, strove to tame Bellona."

== List of works ==
- Journal du siége de Bergopzoom en 1747 red. par un lieutenant-colonel ingenieur volontaire de l'armée des assiegeans. Avec les plans de la ville & des forts. Amsterdam & Leipzig 1750.
- Neues Kriegs- Ingenieur- Artillerie- See-omd Ritter-Lexicon. 2 vols. Dresden & Leipzig 1757.
- Dödsens tempel. Af fransöskan öfwers. Stockholm 1747. [Translation of a French poem into Swedish]
- [as editor] F. A. Aubert de la Chesnaye des Bois, Dictionnaire militaire ou recueil alphabetique de tous les termes propres à la guerre . . . par M. A. D. L. C. Nouv. éd., revue, Corrigée & considérablement augm. par M. E[ggers]. 2 vols. Dresden 1751.

== Sources cited ==
- Bothe, Jan Philipp (2018). "How to "Ravage" a Country: Destruction, Conservation and Assessment of Natural Environments in Early Modern Military Thought". The Hungarian Historical Review. 7 (3): 510–540. JSTOR 26571623.
- Dahl, Torsten, ed. (1948). Svenska män och kvinnor. Biografisk uppslagsbok [Swedish men and women. Biographical dictionary] (in Swedish). Vol. 2. Stockholm: Albert Bonnier. p. 319. OCLC 4629338.
- Elgenstierna, Gustaf (1926). Den introducerade svenska adelns ättartavlor (in Swedish). Vol. 2. Stockholm: P. A. Nordstedt. OCLC 20464762.
- Hildebrand, Bengt (1949). "Jacob von Eggers". Svenskt biografiskt lexikon (in Swedish). Vol. 12. p. 201 – via Swedish National Archives.
- Hofberg, Herman; Heurlin, Frithiof; Millqvist, Viktor; Rubenson, Olof, eds. (1906). Svenskt biografiskt handlexikon [Swedish biographical handbook] (in Swedish). Vol. 1. Stockholm: Bonniers. OCLC 474064019.
- Hohrath, Daniel (1999). "Jacob von Eggers (1704-1773)". Aufklärung (in German). 11 (2): 99–101. JSTOR 24361435.
