= Battle of Melle =

1745 battle of the War of the Austrian Succession

- Part of the War of the Austrian Succession
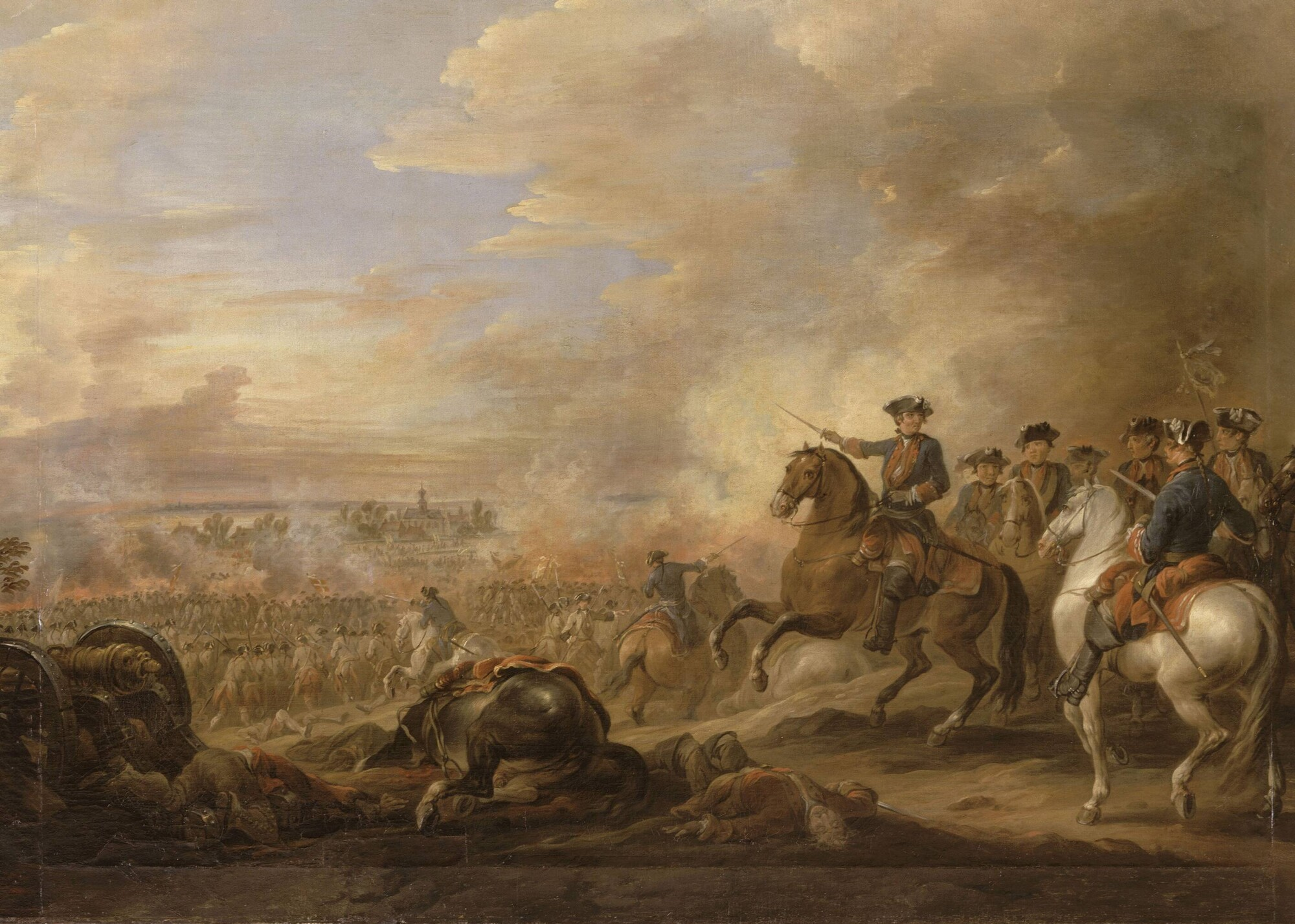
- Painting of the battle by Pierre L'Enfant
Date	9 July 1745
Location	Melle, Austrian Netherlands 51°00′00″N 3°48′27″E
Result	French victory

Belligerents
France	Austria; Great Britain (Province of Hanover) Hanover; Dutch Republic

Commanders and leaders
(Kingdom of France) Nicolas Joseph Balthazar de l'Anglade	(Habsburg monarchy) Philipp Ludwig von Moltke

Strength
6,000–8,000	4,000–6,000

Casualties and losses
200 killed or wounded	500 killed or wounded 1,500 captured

The Battle of Melle was an encounter battle fought on 9 July 1745, during the War of the Austrian Succession, between forces of the Pragmatic Allies and the French. After their defeat at Fontenoy in May, the Duke of Cumberland, Allied commander in Flanders, was under pressure from the Austrians to defend Brussels. He also wanted to protect the key port of Ghent, a major supply depot threatened by the French advance into West Flanders.

Cumberland compromised by employing his main force to cover Brussels, while sending 4,000 men under Austrian general Freiherr Philipp Ludwig von Moltke to reinforce Ghent. On the way, it ran into a French detachment under General Nicolas Joseph Balthazar de l'Anglade, vicomte du Chayla, positioned near the town of Melle to prevent such an attempt; the Allies were driven off with heavy losses and Ghent surrendered on 13 July.

== Preliminary maneuvers ==
After the French victory at the battle of Fontenoy and the capture of the city of Tournai, Marshal Saxe began to exploit the weakness of the allies and maneuvered so as to threaten Brussels and Brabant, Ghent and Flanders forcing the Duke of Cumberland, over-all commander of the Allies, to choose which places to defend. Of the allies' two major magazines, Ghent and Brussels, Ghent was of more value as the supplies there had been reserved while those in Brussels had been used. However, Cumberland decided to defend Brabant and Brussels with the field army while sending some troops to increase the garrison of Ghent and issuing orders to transport the supplies out of Ghent.

Saxe sent Du Chayla on a reconnaissance in force to Melle, a small town between Ghent and the town of Aalst. His command consisted of two infantry brigades, Normandie and Crillon, each consisting of four battalions; a detachment of Grassins, light infantry, and three brigades of cavalry: Berry, Royal Étranger and Du Roy, some twenty four squadrons. There were about twenty small battalion guns and twenty pontoons in a camp being established on and around the road that ran between the town of Aalst and Ghent. Parts of the Normandie brigade, some two battalions, were dispersed in various posts along the Scheldt and the road to Ghent as was the some of Crillon. Du Chayla sent his light troops, the Grassins, towards Aalst to reconnoitre.

Moltke had orders from Cumberland to throw as many troops as possible from Aalst into Ghent to reinforce the garrison. Moltke's force was made up of a brigade commanded by Brigadier Thomas Bligh of three British infantry regiments: the Royal Scots, or 1st Foot; Bligh's 20th Foot and Handasyde's 16th Foot; three squadrons of a British cavalry regiment, Rich's 4th Dragoons; two squadrons of Hanoverian cavalry: one of the Leib-Regiment and one of Adelebsen's Dragoons; five or six squadrons of Dutch cavalry from Slippenbach's Dragoons; and two or three squadrons of Austrian cavalry: de Ligne's and Styrum's Dragoons and some 300 Austrian Hussars.

== Battle ==
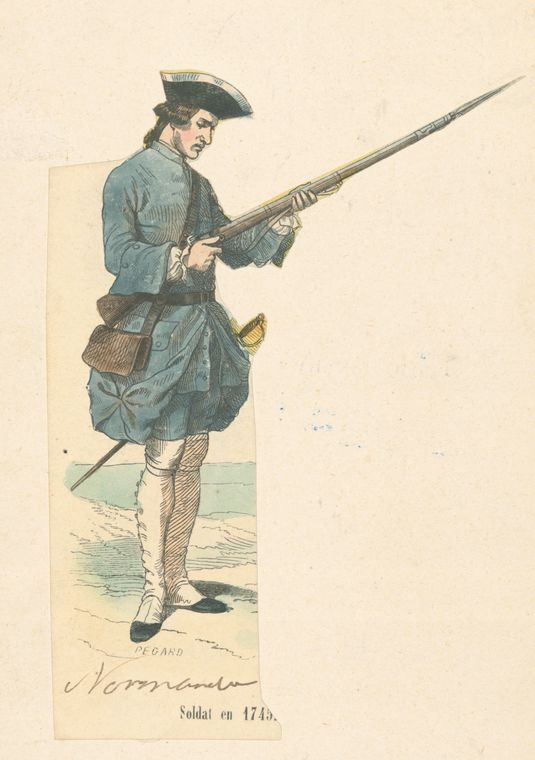
French soldier of the Normandie brigade in 1745

On 9 July the light troops of the Grassins advanced east towards Aalst and occupied the Château de Massemen, a strong walled complex some eight miles west of Aalst near Melle. Moltke sent the Royals to drive them off and a vigorous fire-fight broke out, but without artillery the Royals were unable to dislodge de Grassin and his men. The 1st Foot then rejoined the rest of the force and it was decided by Moltke, without informing Bligh, to leave the Grassins in the rear and advance as instructed down the raised causeway road to Ghent.

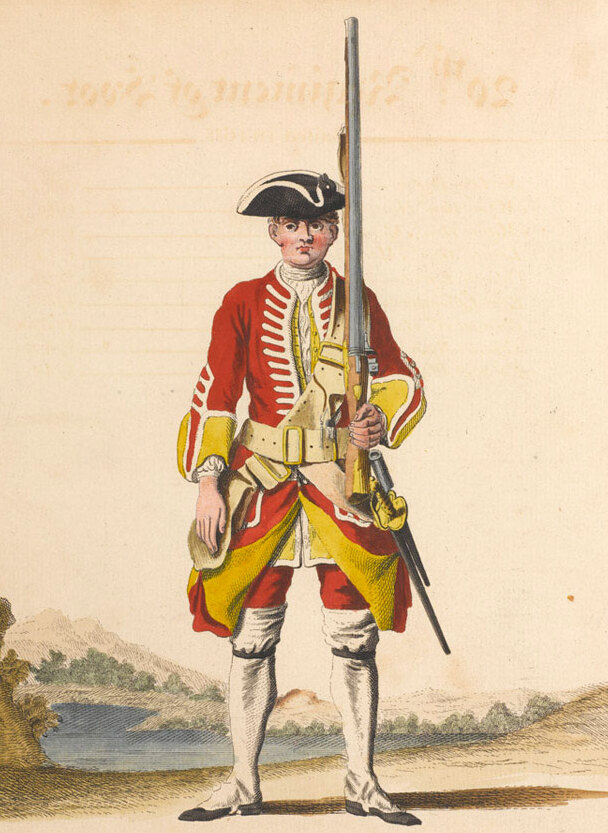
Private of the British 20th Regiment of Foot in c. 1742. The depicted single-breasted coat was replaced by a lapelled coat in 1743.

Despite some notice of the allied advance from messengers sent by de Grassin, Du Chayla's force was fairly dispersed in various posts along the route and in the process of making camp. The twenty artillery pieces were in park along the road facing north, baggage wagons and pontoon wagons in rows behind them. A stone bridge on the road crossing the Gontrode Brook, a stream that flowed into the Scheldt, was unguarded and a walled priory flanking the road only lightly occupied. One battalion of the Normandie brigade was posted in the town of Melle another well to the west of Melle. The battalions of Crillon brigade were also dispersed around the area, some taking post or billeting in the various chateaus and farm houses with one battalion astride the road west of the bridge. Both sides were surprised by the contact, the French by the sudden arrival of the allies in force while the French were in the process of establishing their camp and the allies by the size and positions of the French force.

Moltke, with the Royal Scots, led the advanced guard column of about 1,700 troops consisting of some 650 infantry of the Royal Scots and about 1,050 cavalry. They crossed the bridge, charged and dispersed the Crillon battalion commencing the action at about 7 p.m.. They then rushed up the road and overran the artillery park briefly capturing the guns. However, as the guns were unlimbered in park, not for action, the Royals were unable to use them against the French. The Duc de Laval and his battalion of the Crillon brigade then came up behind the pontoons and wagons engaging the Royal Scots soon to be followed by two more battalions led by Le Marquis de Crillon. The nature of the terrain was unfavorable to cavalry and the allied cavalry was unable to aid the Royals. During the ensuing musketry duel, Moltke decided to take the Hussars and Rich's Dragoons and some Hanoverian cavalry and make a dash for Ghent. A small detachment of Du Berry's cavalry held them up as some of the Normandie brigade arrived forcing Moltke off the causeway onto other tracks. A French battalion cut the road behind them. Now Moltke broke off with the entire force and headed for Ghent running a gauntlet of fire from the various French posts along the roads and ways and abandoning the rest of the column, losing about one half of this force, including nearly 400 of the Royal Scots.

During this time, Bligh came up the road with his regiment, the 20th Foot, with some of the Dutch cavalry following. Next came Handasyde's 16th with the rest of the cavalry. With Moltke gone, Bligh assumed command of the nearly 1,450 infantry and some 1,000 cavalry. The ground around the road was unfavorable to the cavalry of both sides and would not permit full deployment with the French firing from front and flank, so Bligh fell back to better position in a field south of the road behind the Gontrode Brook rivulet with most of his center and his left behind some woods and his right on the raised causeway on the other side from priory. This covered him from the fire of a couple of companies of French grenadiers behind the wall of the priory and gave him a defensible front of rough terrain that prevented any cavalry actions. The regiments formed a line of battle with the cavalry in support advancing on and engaging the French that came up. Du Chayla counter-attacked, perhaps now five battalions: Laval, two of Crillon and two of Normandie from Melle, about 2,000 strong, with a battery of artillery and most of the French cavalry in support. While the two sides were locked in a fire-fight, the Grassins that had been bypassed by the allies earlier in the day now arrived in Bligh's rear capturing all the baggage and supplies and cutting the line of retreat down the road to Aalst.

Bligh, seeing that he was now in danger of losing his whole force, withdrew at about 9 p.m., in some disorder, through the woods and fields to the south-east, staying off the road until he was near to Aalst where he arrived with considerable loss, including all the baggage.

== Aftermath ==
The defeat cut off Ghent from any further support. Saxe sent Ulrich Frédéric Woldemar, Comte de Lowendal, with another 15,000 troops to complete the investment of the city. Lowendal opened the trenches and the Dutch governor surrendered. The city of Ghent, with an immense amount of supplies and material along with its garrison consisting of Dutch and some 700 British troops from the Royals 1st Foot, the 23rd Royal Welch Fusiliers and most of Rich's surviving dragoons fell to the French on 11 July and the citadel on 15 July. This was soon followed by the capture of Bruges and Oudenarde on 19 July.
