= Normandy Regiment =

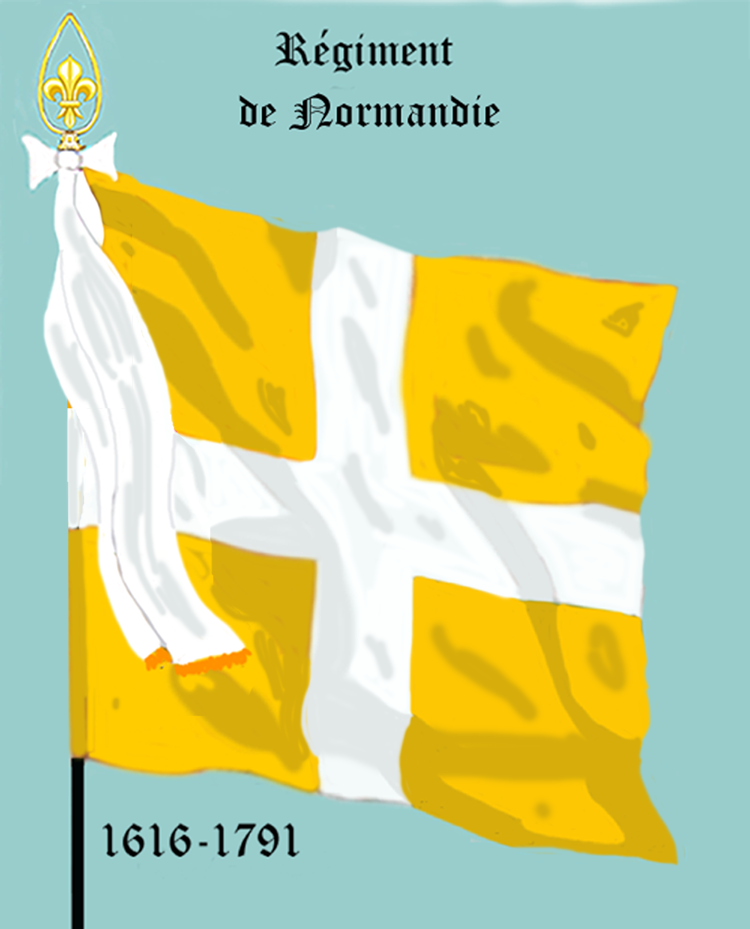
Flag of Régiment de Normandie

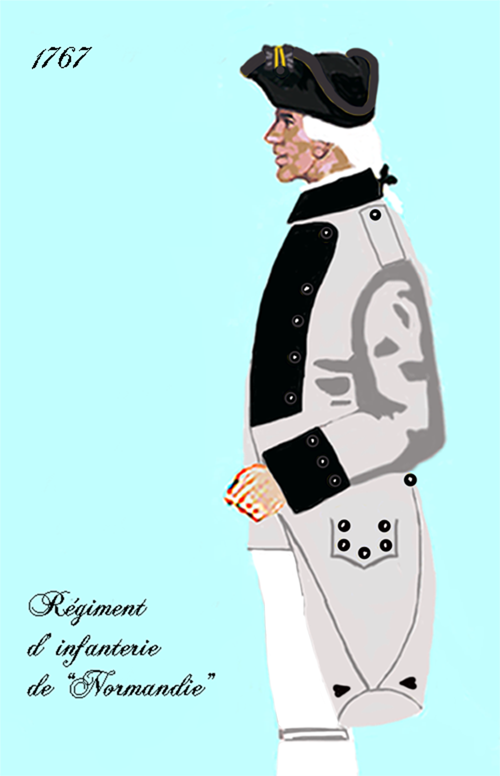
Régiment de Normandie uniform in 1767

The Régiment de Normandie was created in 1616 from different military groups in Normandy by the Maréchal of France Concini, marquis d'Ancre and the favorite of the Queen Marie de Médicis.

== See also ==
- Military of New France
