= Fall of Ghent =

1745 siege

- Part of War of the Austrian Succession
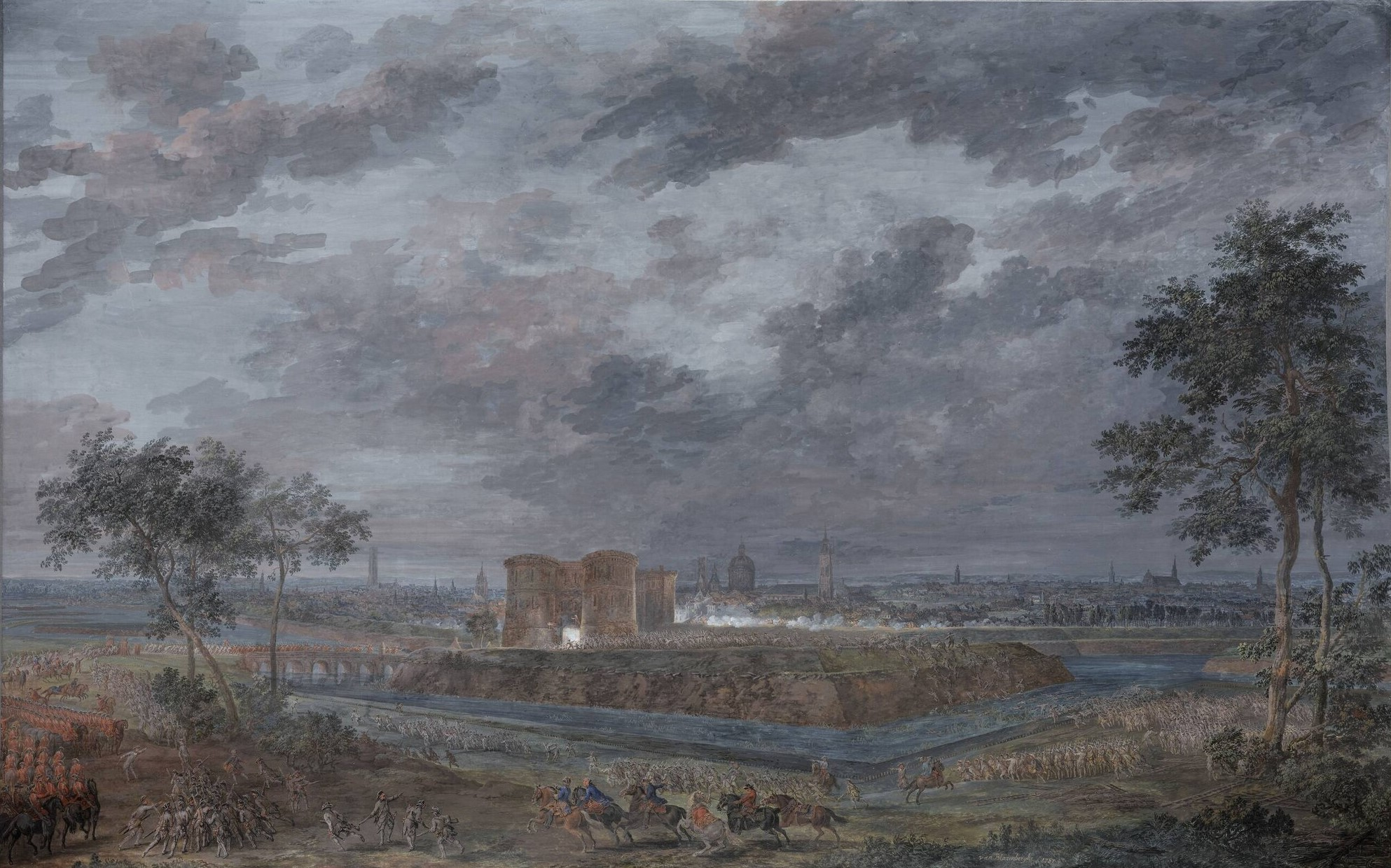
- Surprise of the city of Ghent by Louis-Nicolas van Blarenberghe, 1787
Date	July 1745
Location	Ghent, Austrian Netherlands 51°03′00″N 3°43′00″E
Result	French victory

Belligerents
France	Austria; Great Britain (Province of Hanover) Hanover; Dutch Republic

Commanders and leaders
(Kingdom of France) Comte de Lowendal	Unknown
- Location within Belgium

The Fall of Ghent occurred on 15 July 1745 during the War of the Austrian Succession when a 5,000 strong French force under Ulrich Frédéric Woldemar, Comte de Lowendal surprised and captured the town of Ghent in the Austrian Netherlands. The Allied garrison offered little resistance.

Coming in the wake of the Battle of Fontenoy, the loss of Ghent proved a shock to the Allies. The town had been used as a major base for the Pragmatic Army since it had assembled in 1742. It was extremely important as a supply base as its stores had been reserved and not used. A British regiment, including James Wolfe, had left shortly before the fall of the town and narrowly avoided becoming prisoners of war. A column of 4,000 to 5,000 British, Hanoverian, Dutch and Austrian reinforcements sent by the Duke of Cumberland was defeated by the French at the Battle of Melle with only some 1,000 men getting through to Ghent.

The city was fully invested and the town was seized on July 11. Lowendal opened the trenches and sapped towards the citadel. Without hope of relief or reinforcement and with Lowendal strengthened by 15,000 the garrison of the citadel was demoralised and fell to a coup de main on July 15. Some 3,000 allied prisoners were taken as well as a vast quantity of military stores. The following year the town was used as a staging point for a French advance which culminated in the Siege of Brussels.

== Bibliography ==
- Browning, Reed. The War of the Austrian Succession. Alan Sutton Publishing, 1994.
- Brumwell, Stephen (2007). Paths of Glory: The Life and Death of General James Wolfe, Continuum International Publishing Group, 432 p. ISBN 978-0-7735-3261-8 (preview)
