= Ulrich Friedrich Woldemar von Löwendal =

Danish officer and statesman

Graf Ulrich Friedrich Woldemar von Löwendal
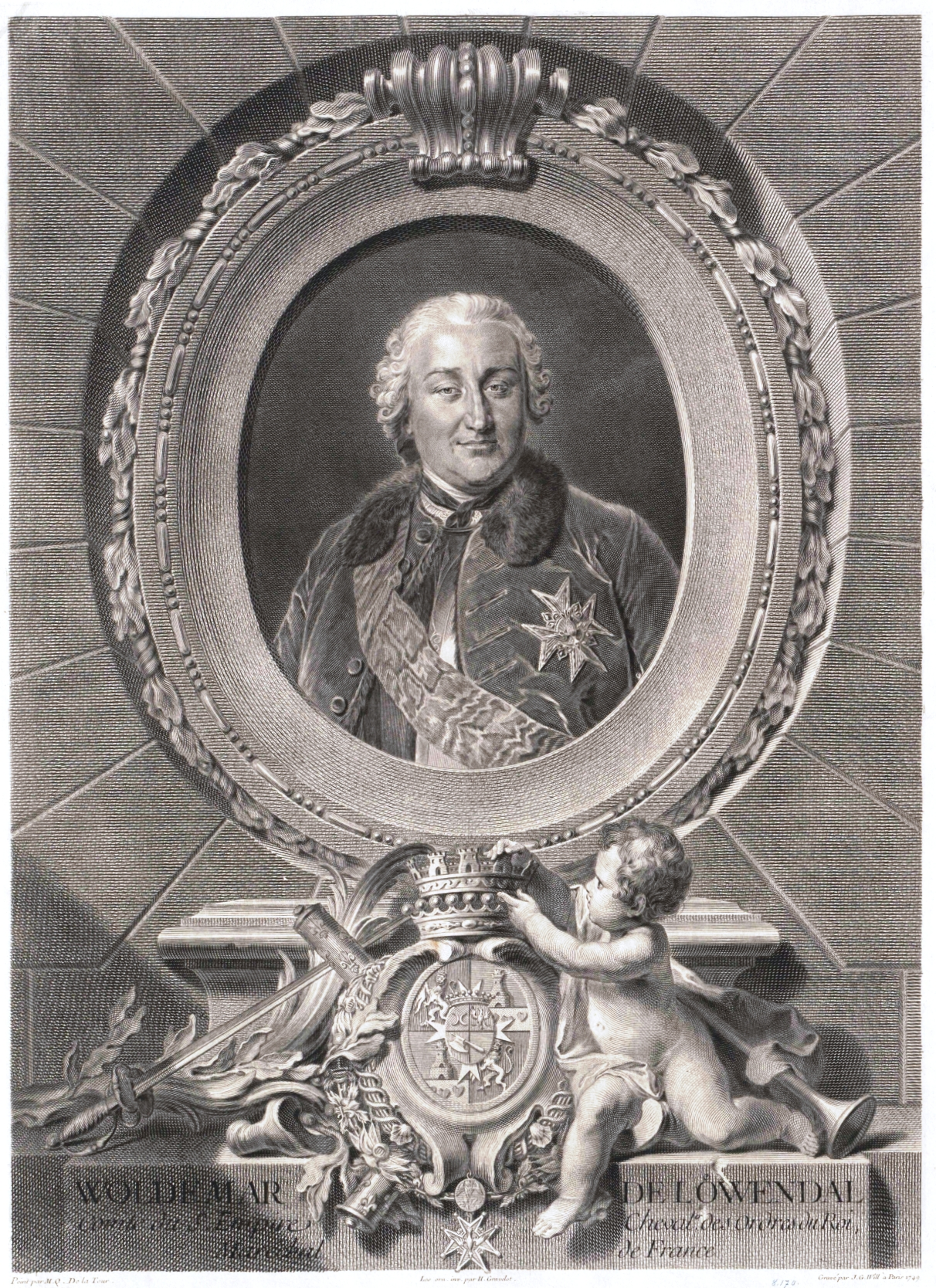
- Ulrich Friedrich Woldemar de Lowendal
- Born: 1 April 1700; Free Imperial City of Hamburg
- Died: 27 May 1755 (aged 55); Paris, France
- Military career
- Allegiance: Holy Roman Empire (1700–1707); Denmark-Norway (1707–1708); Electorate of Saxony (1708–1716); Holy Roman Empire (1716–1722); Electorate of Saxony (1722–1735); Holy Roman Empire (1735–1736); Russian Empire (1736–1744); Kingdom of France (1744–1755)
- Branch: French Royal Army
- Service years: 1707–1755
- Rank: Marshal of France
- Conflicts: War of the Polish Succession; Russo-Ottoman War; War of the Austrian Succession

Ulrich Friedrich Woldemar Graf von Löwendal (Russian: Ульрих Фридрих Вольдемар граф фон Левендаль, tr. Ulrikh Fridrikh Vol'demar Graf fon Levendal'; 1700–1755) was a German and later Russian and French officer and statesman.

== Life ==
Born in Hamburg, Graf von Löwendal served in the armies of several countries.

He served first under German Emperor Charles VI in the Imperial Army. He joined the Danish Army for a short time, then he returned to the Imperial Army of the Holy Roman Empire. Later he served Augustus II the Strong, who made him Feldmarschall and Generalinspektor of the Saxon Infantry. 1734 to 1735 he commanded the troops of Saxony at the Rhine. Later, like so many Germans, he served in the Imperial Russian Army, fighting the Turks 1739 by Khotyn.

From 1740 until 1743 he was Governor-General of the Ostsee governorates of the Russian Empire. In 1741 Augustus III, who was Reichsvikar, granted him the title of "Reichsgraf". But he is best known for his service in the French army during the War of the Austrian Succession.

=== French army ===
From 1744 to 1755 he served in the French army. In the French campaign in the Austrian Netherlands against the Pragmatic Army he served as a subordinate to Maurice de Saxe. He led French forces that captured Ghent in 1745 and Bergen-op-Zoom in 1747. The King of France, Louis XV, made him a Marshal of France for his success in capturing Bergen op Zoom.

In 1755 Louis XV gave Lowendal instructions to act as a Plenipotentiary in negotiations with Prussia, designed to prevent the Seven Years' War from breaking out. However Lowendal died before he could carry out his orders and was replaced by Louis Jules Mancini Mazarini, Duc de Nivernais.

== Death ==
Marshall Ulrich Friedrich Woldemar Graf von Löwendal died on 27 May 1755 in Paris. He had been married twice:

- first since 23 January 1722 to Theodora Eugenia von Schmettau (1705–1768), daughter of German General Gottlieb von Schmettau
- secondly since 13 November 1736 to Barbe Madeleine Countess von Szembek (1709–1762)

He was father of eight children from both marriages.

== Bibliography ==
- Browning, Reed. The War of the Austrian Succession. Alan Sutton, 1994.
- Dull, Jonathan R. The French Navy and the Seven Years' War. University of Nebraska, 2005.
- Lodge, Sir Richard. Studies in Eighteenth Century diplomacy 1740–48. John Murray, 1930.
- Boucher, Jean-Jacques. Le comte de Lowendal, Ulrich-Frédéric Woldemar, Maréchal de France, 1700-1755. Éditions Lanore, 2012
