= 1743 =

1743 in various calendars
- Gregorian calendar: 1743; MDCCXLIII
- Ab urbe condita: 2496
- Armenian calendar: 1192; ԹՎ ՌՃՂԲ
- Assyrian calendar: 6493
- Balinese saka calendar: 1664–1665
- Bengali calendar: 1149–1150
- Berber calendar: 2693
- British Regnal year: 16 Geo. 2 – 17 Geo. 2
- Buddhist calendar: 2287
- Burmese calendar: 1105
- Byzantine calendar: 7251–7252
- Chinese calendar: 壬戌年 (Water Dog); 4440 or 4233 — to — 癸亥年 (Water Pig); 4441 or 4234
- Coptic calendar: 1459–1460
- Discordian calendar: 2909
- Ethiopian calendar: 1735–1736
- Hebrew calendar: 5503–5504
- Hindu calendars
- Vikram Samvat: 1799–1800
- Shaka Samvat: 1664–1665
- Kali Yuga: 4843–4844
- Holocene calendar: 11743
- Igbo calendar: 743–744
- Iranian calendar: 1121–1122
- Islamic calendar: 1155–1156
- Japanese calendar: Kanpō 3 (寛保３年)
- Javanese calendar: 1667–1668
- Julian calendar: Gregorian minus 11 days
- Korean calendar: 4076
- Minguo calendar: 169 before ROC 民前169年
- Nanakshahi calendar: 275
- Thai solar calendar: 2285–2286
- Tibetan calendar: ཆུ་ཕོ་ཁྱི་ལོ་ (male Water-Dog); 1869 or 1488 or 716 — to — ཆུ་མོ་ཕག་ལོ་ (female Water-Boar); 1870 or 1489 or 717

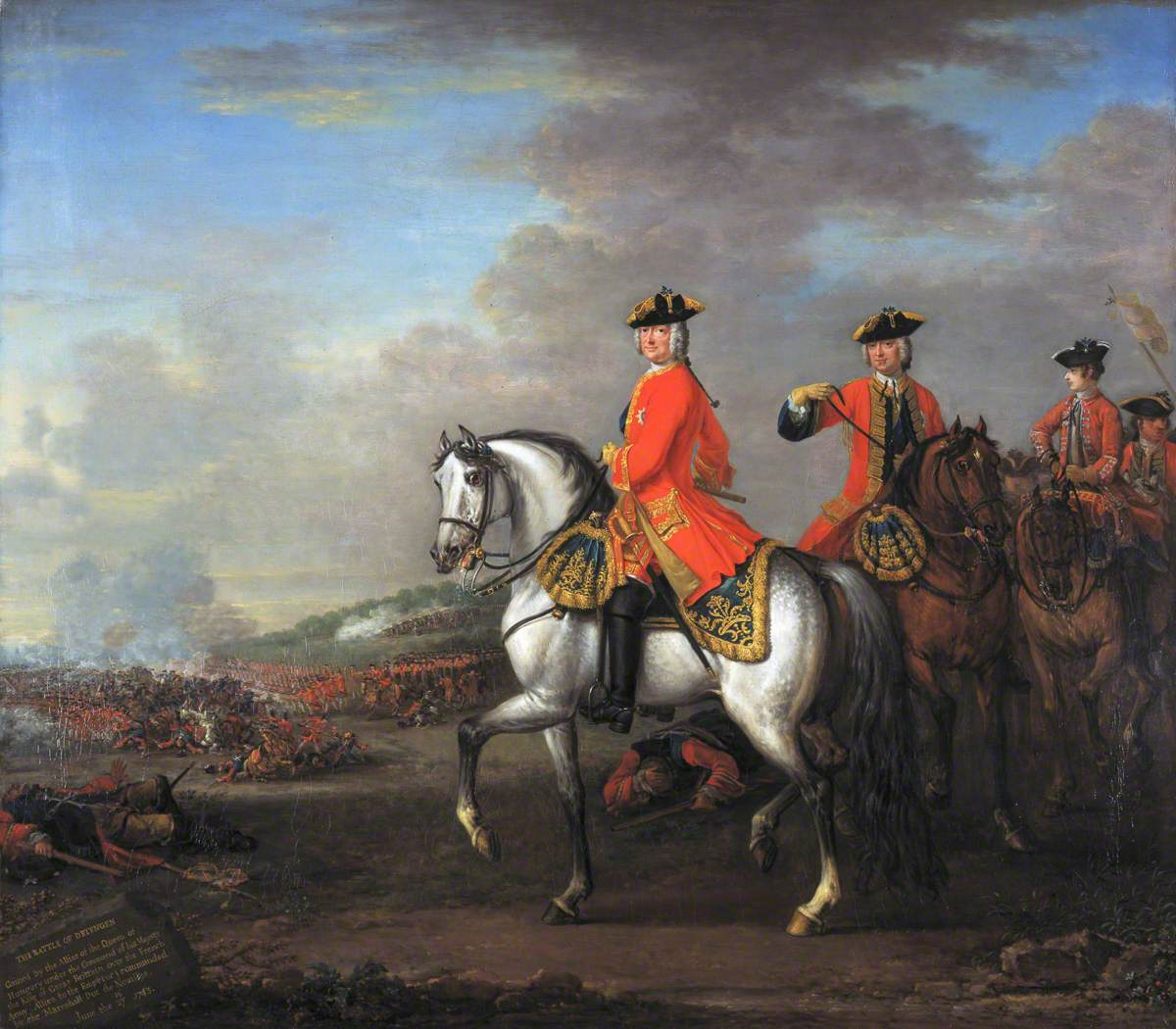
June 27: George II, King of Great Britain and Elector of Hanover, leads British, Hanoverian and Austrian troops to victory over France at the Battle of Dettingen.

1743 (MDCCXLIII) was a common year starting on Tuesday of the Gregorian calendar and a common year starting on Saturday of the Julian calendar, the 1743rd year of the Common Era (CE) and Anno Domini (AD) designations, the 743rd year of the 2nd millennium, the 43rd year of the 18th century, and the 4th year of the 1740s decade. As of the start of 1743, the Gregorian calendar was 11 days ahead of the Julian calendar, which remained in localized use until 1923.

== Events ==
=== January–March ===
- January 1 – The Verendrye brothers, probably Louis-Joseph and François de La Vérendrye, become the first white people to see the Rocky Mountains from the eastern side (the Spanish conquistadors had seen the Rockies from the west side).
- January 8 – King Augustus III of Poland, acting in his capacity as Elector of Saxony, signs an agreement with Austria, pledging help in war in return for part of Silesia to be conveyed to Saxony.
- January 12
  - The Verendryes, and two members of the Mandan Indian tribe, reach the foot of the mountains, near the site of what is now Helena, Montana.
  - An earthquake strikes the Philippines
- January 16 – Cardinal André-Hercule de Fleury turns his effects over to King Louis XV, 13 days before his death on January 29.
- January 23 – With mediation by France, Sweden and Russia begin peace negotiations at Åbo (Turku) to end the Russo-Swedish War. By August 17, Sweden cedes all of its claims to southern Finland.
- February 21 – George Frideric Handel's oratorio, Samson, premieres in London.
- March 2 – A British expeditionary fleet under Sir Charles Knowles is defeated by the Spanish in the Battle of La Guaira.

=== April–June ===
- April 1 – Pope Benedict XIV issues a new bill, barring agreements by spouses not to appeal annulments of marriages
- April 2 – The Verendrye brothers bury a tablet claiming the Great Plains of North America for King Louis XV of France. A schoolgirl in Pierre, South Dakota, unearths the tablet 170 years later on February 16, 1913.
- April 3 – Prithvi Narayan Shah becomes the new King of the Gorkha Kingdom and begins a campaign to unify the 54 different principalities in the Himalayas under his rule as part of the unification of Nepal
- April 9 – The Verendrye brothers make the first contact since 1722 between Europeans and the Sioux Indians, whom they refer to as Les Gens de la Fleche Collee ("the people of the sheathed arrow").
- April 13 – The British East India Company ship Princess Louisa is wrecked off the coast of Maio Island in the Cape Verde Islands, killing 49 of her 179 crew.
- April 18 – The trustees of the English Province of Georgia vote to inaugurate public schools in the corporate territory.
- May 9 – Austrian army defeats the Bavarian army in the Battle of Simbach.
- May 10 – In New France, Jean-Baptiste Le Moyne de Bienville ends his final term (multiple times over 43 years) as Governor of colonial French Louisiana, which he helped colonize; he is succeeded by the Marquis de Vaudreuil (for the next 10 years) and returns to France.
- May 30 – The Dalecarlian rebellion (1743) breaks out in Sweden.
- June 27 (June 16 O.S.) – War of the Austrian Succession – Battle of Dettingen in Bavaria: British forces, in alliance with those of Hanover and Hesse, defeat a French army under the duc de Noailles; King George II of Great Britain (and Elector of Brunswick) leads his own troops, the last British king to do so.

=== July–September ===
- July 3 – As a concession to Russia, Sweden's parliament ratifies the election of Adolphus Frederick of Holstein-Gottorp, a great-grandson of King Charles XI, to be heir to the throne of Sweden. Adolphus becomes king on the death of King Frederick on April 5, 1751, marking the end of the Hesse-Kassel dynasty and the start of the dynasty of the Holstein-Gottorp that will rule Sweden from 1751 to 1818
- July 13 – All 276 people on board the Dutch East India Company ship Hollandia drown after the ship strikes a rock off of the Isles of Scilly in England near Cornwall. The wreckage is located in 1971.
- July 20 – Lord Anson captures the Philippine galleon Nuestra Señora de Covadonga and its treasure of 1,313,843 Spanish dollars at Manila along with a treasure of 2 1/2 million dollars, and proceeds back toward Mexico, then returns to Britain in 1744
- July 23 – James Oglethorpe departs from Georgia to England and returns there in September.
- July 28 – France and the Allies of Britain conclude a treaty to provide care for each other's wounded.
- July 31 – At a summit in Lancaster, Pennsylvania, the British colonies of Virginia, Maryland and Pennsylvania conclude a treaty with the Six Nations, conceding that the member tribes are entitled to the territory west of the Appalachian mountains and north of the Ohio River.
- August 18 (August 7 Old Style) – Russia and Sweden sign the Treaty of Åbo.
- August 24 – The War of the Hats: The Swedish army surrendered to the Russians in Helsinki, ending the war and starting Lesser Wrath.
- August 27 – Henry Pelham becomes Prime Minister of Great Britain.
- September 11 – Russian noble Natalia Lopukhina is flogged in front of the Twelve Collegia building in Saint Petersburg, bringing a conclusion to the "Lopukhina Affair" plotted by France and the Duchy of Holstein.
- September 13 – The Treaty of Worms is signed between Great Britain, Austria and Sardinia.

=== October–December ===
- October 19 – Louis Maria Colons, one of nine French Canadians who had attempted to colonize territory in what is now New Mexico, is executed for attempting to persuade the Pueblo Indians to rise up against the Spanish colonial government.
- October 21 – Benjamin Franklin's view of a lunar eclipse from Philadelphia is spoiled by a rainstorm; several days later, he learns that residents of Boston received the same storm hours after the eclipse, demonstrating that weather moves from west to east.
- October 23 – After almost six weeks, Nader Shah of Persia lifts the siege of Mosul.
- November 5 – Coordinated scientific observations of the transit of Mercury are organized by Joseph-Nicolas Delisle.
- December 3 – Ecuadorian scientist Pedro Vicente Maldonado departs from Brazil in order to purchase the most state-of-the-art equipment for the French Geodesic Mission
- December 9 – At Haarlem, Dutch astronomer Dirk Klinkenberg becomes the first to observe the Great Comet of 1744. Swiss astronomer Jean-Philippe de Cheseaux discovers it independently on December 13. Both scientists are given credit for its discovery
- December 10 – King Louis XV of France informs King Philip V of Spain of his intent to try to restore the House of Stuart to the throne of the United Kingdom. James Francis Edward Stuart was briefly the Crown Prince of England and Scotland until his father, King James II, was deposed in 1688 and, as Pretender to the Throne, would become King James III if the attack, planned for January 1, 1744 succeeds.
- December 11 – Princess Louise of Great Britain, daughter of King George II, weds Frederick, Crown Prince of Denmark and Norway.

=== Undated ===
- Capodimonte porcelain is first manufactured, in Naples.
- Probable date – The last wolf in Scotland is shot, in Killiecrankie.

== Births ==
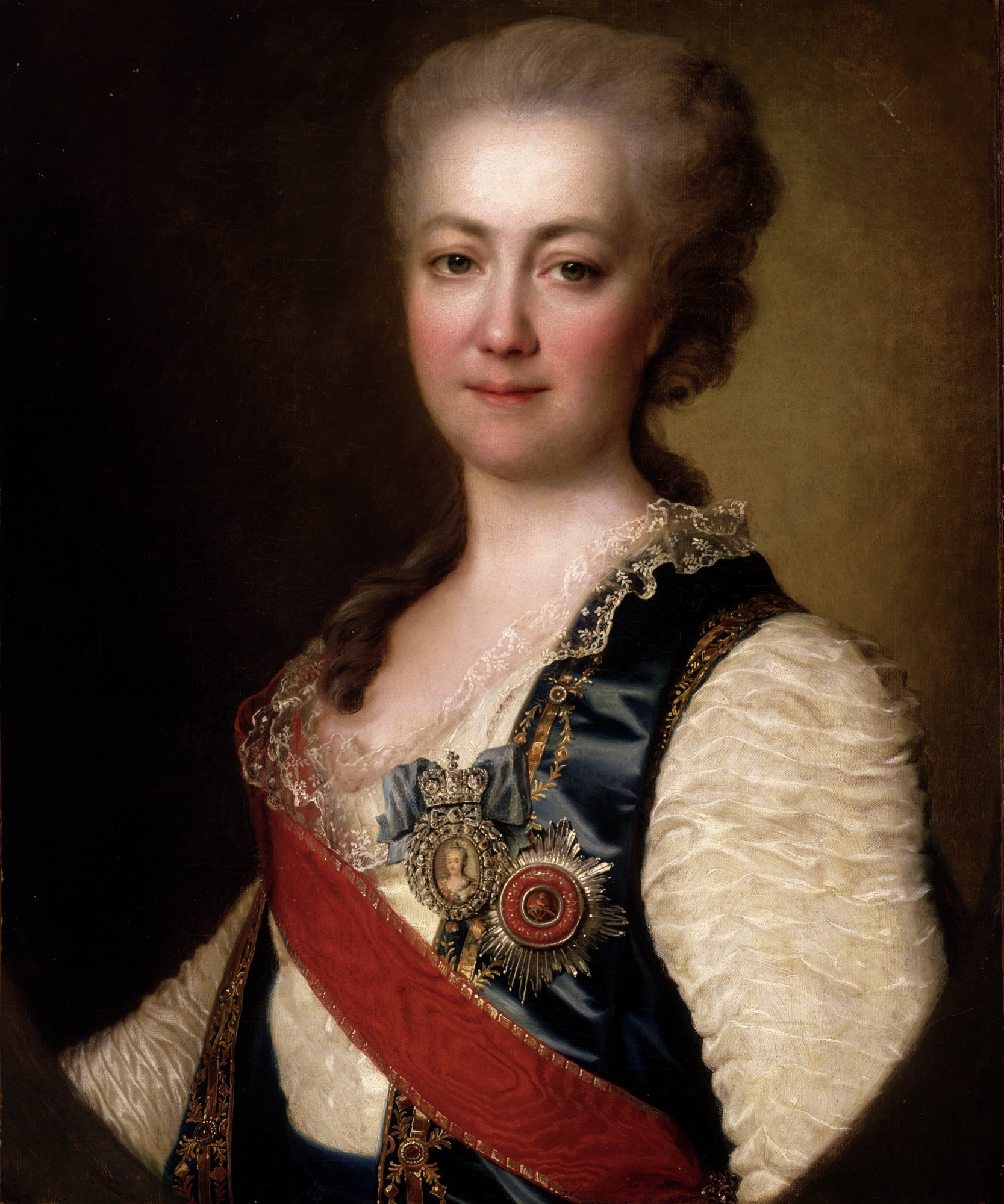
Yekaterina Vorontsova-Dashkova

- January 1 – Sir William Parker, 1st Baronet, of Harburn, British admiral (d. 1802)
- January 18 – Louis Claude de Saint-Martin, French philosopher, "le philosophe inconnu" (d. 1803)
- January 25 – Friedrich Heinrich Jacobi, German philosopher (d. 1819)
- February 13 – Sir Joseph Banks, British naturalist and botanist (d. 1820)
- February 14 – George Morgan, American merchant and Indian agent (d. 1810)
- February 19 – Luigi Boccherini, Italian composer (d. 1805)
- February 23 – Mayer Amschel Rothschild, German-born banker (d. 1818)
- February 28 – René Just Haüy, French "father of modern crystallography" (d. 1822)
- March – Joseph Brant, Mohawk leader (d. 1807)
- March 4 – Johann David Wyss, Swiss author (d. 1818)
- March 14 – Hannah Cowley, English dramatist and poet (d. 1809)
- March 28 (March 17 O.S.) – Yekaterina Vorontsova-Dashkova, Russian princess, courtier and patron of the arts and sciences (d. 1810)
- April – Etta Palm d'Aelders, Dutch-French feminist (d. 1799)
- April 1 – Richard Butler American general (d. 1793)
- April 13 – Thomas Jefferson, third President of the United States, author of the Declaration of American Independence (d. 1826)
- May 14 – Louis Lebègue Duportail French military leader in the Continental Army during the American Revolutionary War (d. 1802)
- May 17 – Seth Warner American revolutionary hero (d. 1784)
- May 20 – Toussaint Louverture, Haitian rebel (d. 1803)
- May 24 – Jean-Paul Marat, French revolutionary, doctor and scientist (d. 1793)
- June 2 – Alessandro Cagliostro, Italian Freemason (d. 1795)
- June 3
  - José Fernando de Abascal y Sousa, Spanish viceroy of Peru (d. 1821)
  - Lucia Galeazzi Galvani, Italian scientist (d. 1788)
- August 7 – Susan Carnegie, writer and founder of the first public asylum in Scotland (d.1821)
- August 26 – Antoine Lavoisier, French chemist (d. 1794)
- August 29 – Johann Jacob Ferber, Swedish mineralogist
- September 11 – Nikolaj Abraham Abildgaard, Danish painter (d. 1809)
- September 17 – Marquis de Condorcet, French mathematician, philosopher, and political scientist (d. 1794)
- October 20 – François Chopart, French surgeon (1795)
- November 11 – Carl Peter Thunberg, Swedish botanist (d. 1828)
- December 1 – Martin Heinrich Klaproth, German chemist, discoverer of uranium (1789), zirconium (1789), and cerium (1803) (d. 1817)
- December 23 – Ippolit Bogdanovich, Russian poet (d. 1803)
- date unknown
  - Károly Hadaly, Hungarian mathematician (d. 1834)
  - Elisabeth Christina von Linné, Swedish botanist (d. 1782)

== Deaths ==
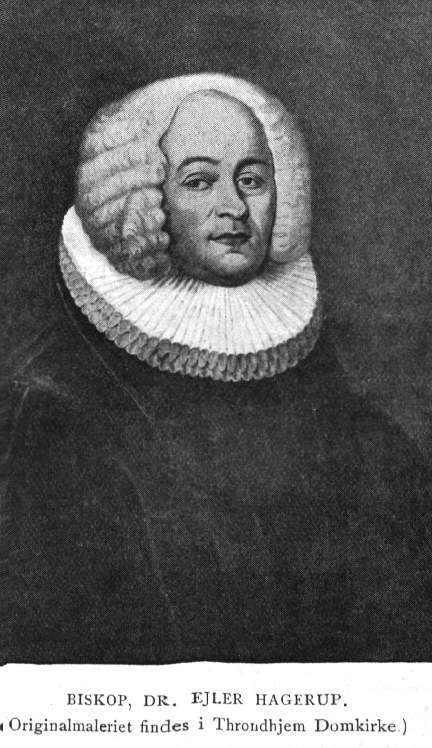
Eiler Hagerup

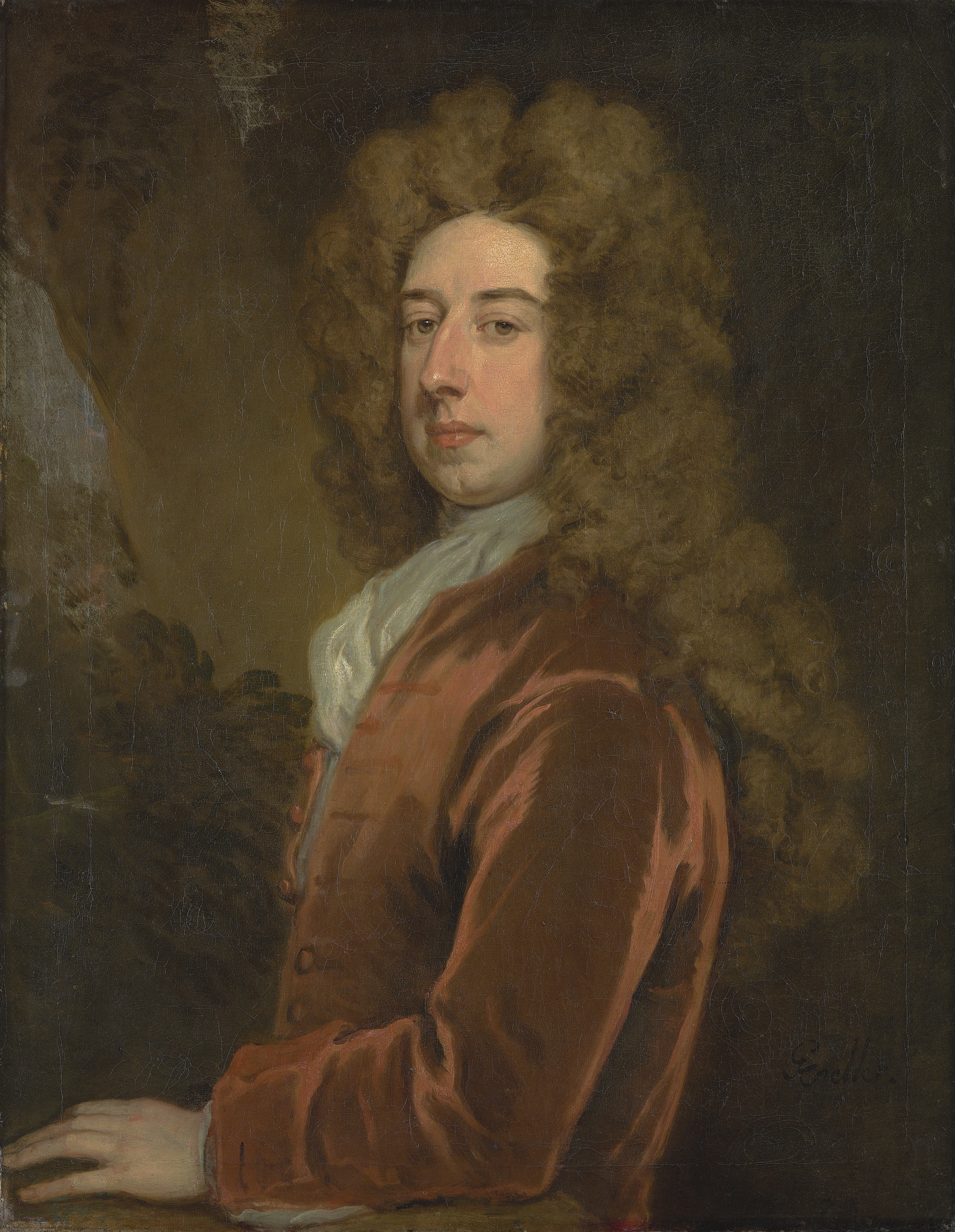
Spencer Compton, 1st Earl of Wilmington

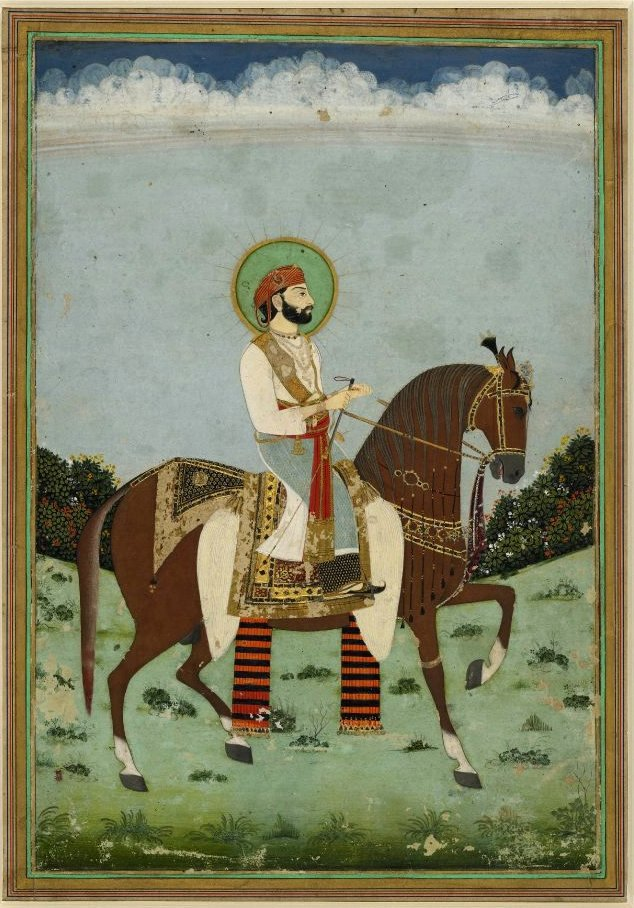
Jai Singh II

- January 3 – Ferdinando Galli-Bibiena, Italian architect/painter (b. 1657)
- January 29 – Cardinal André-Hercule de Fleury, Bishop of Fréjus, chief minister of France under Louis XV (b. 1653)
- January 29 – Charles-Irénée Castel de Saint-Pierre, French writer (b. 1658)
- February 1 – Giuseppe Ottavio Pitoni, Italian composer (b. 1657)
- February 7 – Lodovico Giustini, Italian composer (b. 1685)
- February 18 – Anna Maria Luisa de' Medici, last of the Medicis (b. 1667)
- March 22 – Emerentia von Düben, Swedish royal favorite (b. 1669)
- March 28 – Karl Frederick, Duke of Saxe-Meiningen, German noble (b. 1712)
- April 4 – Daniel Neal, English historian (b. 1678)
- April 12 – Augustine Washington, father of the future first President of the United States (b. 1694)
- April 20 – Alexandre-François Desportes, French painter (b. 1661)
- May 3 – Moritz Georg Weidmann, German bookseller (b. 1686)
- May 6 – Andrew Michael Ramsay, English Freemason (b. 1686)
- May 10 – Ehrengard Melusine von der Schulenburg, Duchess of Kendal and Munster (b. 1667)
- March 14 – Jean-Paul Bignon, French priest and man of letters (b. 1662)
- March 23 – Lancelot Blackburne, Archbishop of York (b. 1658)
- April 15 – Eiler Hagerup, Norwegian Roman Catholic bishop (b. 1685)
- June 16 – Louise Françoise, Princess of Condé, eldest daughter of Louis XIV and Madame de Montespan (b. 1673)
- July 2 – Spencer Compton, 1st Earl of Wilmington, British politician, Prime Minister of the United Kingdom (b. c. 1674)
- August 5 – John Hervey, 2nd Baron Hervey, English statesman and writer (b. 1696)
- August 30 – Henry Paget, 1st Earl of Uxbridge, British politician (b. 1663)
- September 14 – Nicolas Lancret, French painter (b. 1690)
- September 21 – Jai Singh II, King of Amber-Juiper, India (b. 1688)
- September 23 – Erik Benzelius the Younger, Swedish priest (b. 1675)
- October 4 – John Campbell, 2nd Duke of Argyll, Scottish soldier (b. 1678)
- December 27 – Hyacinthe Rigaud, French painter (b. 1659)
- date unknown
  - Manuela Desvalls Vergós, Spanish nun, agent and political controversialist
  - Pietro Paolo Troisi, Maltese artist (b. 1686)
