= Great Comet of 1402 =

Comet

C/1402 D1 (Great Comet of 1402)
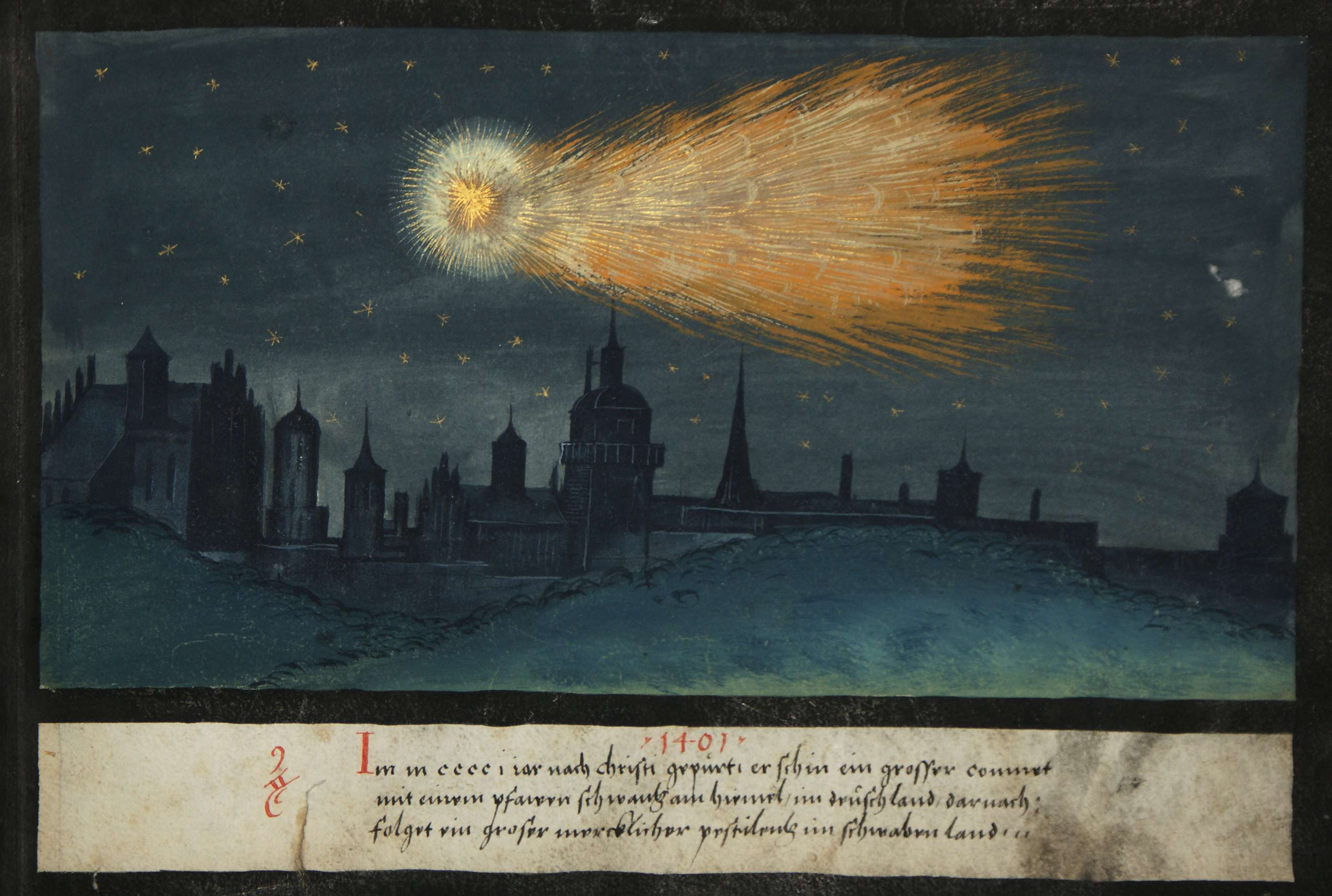
- The comet in the Augsburg Book of Miracles, ca 1552

Discovery
- Discovery date: 8 February 1402

Orbital characteristics
- Epoch: 21 March 1402
- Perihelion: 0.38 AU
- Eccentricity: ~1.000 (assumed)
- Inclination: 55.00°
- Longitude of ascending node: 126.00°
- Argument of periapsis: 91.00°
- Last perihelion: 21 March 1402
- Comet total magnitude (M1): 0–1

The Great Comet of 1402 (designated as C/1402 D1 in modern nomenclature) was a bright comet seen between February and April 1402. The comet was reported to be visible in daylight for eight days, the longest recorded for a comet. The comet is mentioned in many chronicles, with most of them placing the comet in 1402, but it has been suggested that comets mentioned to be seen in 1401 and 1403 are in reality accounts with chronological errors of the great comet of 1402.

== Accounts ==
In Tractatus de Cometis, which is the most extensive account of the comet, Jacobus Angelus mentions that the comet was first seen in early February. In mid-March, he mentions that the tail of the comet was about 45 degrees long and shaped like an inverted pyramid that became diffuse. He last saw the comet on 26 or 27 March, mentioning "in the east before sunrise its vestiges appeared, because I saw three long and very thick hairs", indicating the presence of striae, while one more was visible after sunset, which could be the ion tail.

The Italian chronicle Annales Forolivienses from 1473 mentions the comet was east of Aries in late February and early March and grew brighter. In mid-March, the chronicle mentions that the comet was visible in daylight preceding the Sun. The comet is also mentioned in many other chronicles, including Russian and Muslim ones, which mention it was visible from February to April and that it was large and bright.

The most extensive account from Asian sources is the Korean text T'aejong Sillok, which mentions that the comet was first noticed on 20 February as a broom star with a tail 5–6° long in the area of Khuei (covers parts of Andromeda and Pisces). Two days later, the tail was 10 degrees long. The comet was also seen on 8 March and last seen on 19 March. The comet is also mentioned in a Japanese text from 1715 but is not mentioned by the Chinese.

In his book Historia Byzantina (1462), the historian Doukas mentions that a bright comet was seen during the Battle of Ankara in July 1402, with the description implying that it was visible during daytime, and that it remained visible until the autumnal equinox. However, no other source mentions that comet, and the description also appears exaggerated. David Seargent suggests that Doukas may actually have been referring to the comet seen earlier in 1402 but placed it chronologically to coincide with the battle.

== Orbit ==
John Russell Hind calculated in 1877 an approximate orbit based on the descriptions, with a perihelion distance of 0.38 AU, while the closest approach to Earth was on 20 February at a distance of 0.71 AU. However, Olof Hiorter suggested in 1746 that the Great Comet of 1402 was a previous apparition of the Great Comet of 1744 based on the appearance of the comet and roughly similar orbits and that the comets of 1058 and 715 were also previous apparitions of the comet. Heinrich Wilhelm Matthias Olbers and Johann Holetschek agreed with the claim.

Maik Meyer and Gary Kronk calculated an orbit based on the observations of the Great Comet of 1744 without limitations in the values that indicates an eccentricity of 0.995580 and an orbital period of 354 years, while a parabolic orbit has larger residuals. Excluding the daylight observations, the orbital period is calculated to be about 480 years, indicating the comet has an orbital period of a few hundred years. Based on the unrestricited orbit and including planet perturbations, Meyer and Kronk found a previous perihelion for about 1405.

Meyer and Kronk integrated the orbit backwards for an apparition in 1402 and compared the results with the chronicle reports of the Great Comet of 1405. They found that the reports about the location and the appearance of the comet agreed, with an estimated perihelion on 25 March. They also searched for older apparitions and, based on the backwards calculated orbits, found candidate comets in 1032, 676 and 336 AD. The next previous apparition would be in the middle of 44 BC, around the time that Caesar's Comet was visible. However, they noted that the observation reports contradict and considered the identification with the Great Comet of 1744 as unlikely.
