= Caesar's Comet =

Non-periodic comet

C/−43 K1 (Caesar) (Great Comet of 44 BC)
Discovery
- Discovery date: May 18, 44 BC (earliest mention)

Designations
- Alternative designations: Comet Caesar; Sidus lulium "Julian Star"; Caesaris astrum "Star of Caesar"

Orbital characteristics
- Epoch: May 25, 44 BC(JD 1705496.5)
- Observation arc: 54 days
- Perihelion: 0.22 AU
- Eccentricity: ~1.00 (assumed)
- Inclination: 110°
- Longitude of ascending node: 170°
- Argument of periapsis: 17°
- Last perihelion: May 25, 44 BC

Physical characteristics
- Apparent magnitude: –4.0 (44–43 BC apparition)

Caesar's Comet (also Sidus Iulium ("Julian Star"); Caesaris astrum ("Star of Caesar"); Comet Caesar; the Great Comet of 44 BC; numerical designation C/−43 K1) was a seven-day cometary outburst seen in July 44 BC. It was interpreted by Julius Caesar's contemporaries in Ancient Rome as a sign of the deification of the recently assassinated dictator (100–44 BC).

Based on two questionable reports, one from China (May 30) and another from Rome (July 23), an infinite number of orbit determinations can fit the observations, but a retrograde orbit is inferred based on available notes. The comet approached Earth both inbound in mid-May and outbound in early August. It came to perihelion (closest approach to the Sun) on May 25, −43 at a solar distance of about 0.22 AU (33 million km). At perihelion the comet had a solar elongation of 11 degrees and is hypothesized to have had an apparent magnitude of around −3 as the Chinese report is not consistent with daytime visibility during May. Between June 10 and July 20, the comet would have dimmed from magnitude +1 to around magnitude +5. Around July 20, −43, the comet underwent an estimated 9 magnitude outburst in apparent magnitude and had a solar elongation of 88 degrees in the morning sky. At magnitude −4 it would have been as bright as Venus.

As a result of the cometary outburst in late July, Caesar's Comet is one of only five comets known to have had a negative absolute magnitude (for a comet, that refers to the apparent magnitude if the comet had been observed at a distance of 1 AU from both the Earth and the Sun) and may have been the brightest daylight comet in recorded history.

In the absence of accurate contemporary observations (or later observations that confirm an orbit predicting the earlier appearance), calculation of the comet's orbit is problematic, and a parabolic orbit is conventionally assumed. (In the 1800s, a possible match with the Great Comet of 1680 was speculated, which would give it a period of about 575 years. That has not been confirmed because the later observations were similarly insufficiently accurate.) The parabolic orbital solution estimates that the comet would now be more than 800 AU (120 billion km) from the Sun. At that distance, the Sun provides less light than the full Moon provides to Earth.

== History ==
Caesar's Comet was known to ancient writers as the Sidus Iulium ("Julian Star") or Caesaris astrum ("Star of Caesar"). The comet was visible in daylight and appeared suddenly during the festival known as the Ludi Victoriae Caesaris for which the 44 BC iteration was long considered to have been held in the month of September (a conclusion drawn by Edmund Halley). The dating has recently been revised to a July occurrence in the same year, some four months after the assassination of Julius Caesar, as well as Caesar's own birth month. According to Suetonius, as celebrations were getting underway, "a comet shone for seven successive days, rising about the eleventh hour, and was believed to be the soul of Caesar."

The Comet became a powerful symbol in the political propaganda that launched the career of Caesar's great-nephew (and adoptive son) Augustus. The Temple of Divus Iulius (Temple of the Deified Julius) was built (42 BC) and dedicated (29 BC) by Augustus for purposes of fostering a "cult of the comet". (It was also known as the "Temple of the Comet Star".) At the back of the temple a huge image of Caesar was erected, and according to Ovid, a flaming comet was affixed to its forehead:

To make that soul a star that burns forever
Above the Forum and the gates of Rome.

== On Roman coinage ==
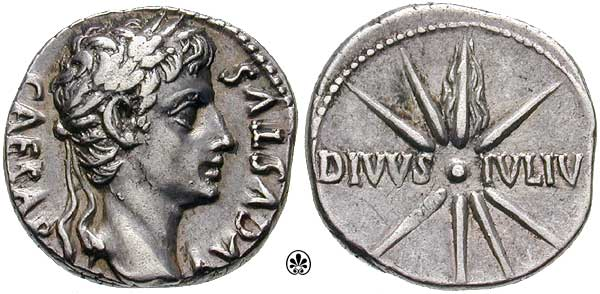
Coin minted by Augustus (c. 19–18 BC); Obverse: CAESAR AVGVSTVS, laureate head right/Reverse: DIVVS IVLIV[S], with comet (star) of eight rays, tail upward

Tracing the coinage from 44 BC through the developing rule of Augustus reveals the changing relationship of Julius Caesar to the Sidus Iulium. Robert Gurval notes that the shifting status of Caesar's Comet in the coinage follows a definite pattern. Representations of the deified Julius Caesar as a star appeared relatively quickly, occurring within several years of his death. About 30 years passed, however, before the star completed its transformation into a comet. Starting in 44 BC, a money maker named P. Sepullius Macer created coins with the front displaying Julius Caesar crowned with a wreath and a star behind his head. On the back, Venus, the patron goddess of the Julian family, holds a starred scepter. Gurval maintains that the coin was minted about the time of Caesar's assassination and thus probably would not have originally referred to his deification. As it circulated, however, it would have brought that idea to mind because of Caesar's new cult. Kenneth Scott's older work The Sidus Iulium and the Apotheosis of Caesar contests that by assuming that the comet indeed sparked the series because of similarity to other coins that he produced. A series of Roman aurei and denarii minted after this cult began to show Mark Antony and a star, which most likely represents his position as Caesar's priest. In later coins, likely originating near the end of Octavian's war with Sextus Pompey, the star supplants Caesar's name and face entirely, clearly representing his divinity.

One of the clearest and earliest correlations of Caesar to a comet occurred during the Secular Games of 17 BC, when the money maker M. Sanquinius fashioned coins whose reverse sports a comet over the head of a wreathed man whom classicists and numismatists speculate is either a youthful Caesar, the Genius of the Secular Games, the Julian family, or Aeneas' son Iulus. Those coins strengthened the link between Julius Caesar and Augustus since Augustus associated himself with the Julians. Another set of Spanish coins displays an eight-rayed comet with the words DIVVS IVLIV, meaning dīvus Iūlius, 'Divine Julius'.

== In literature ==
The poet Virgil writes in his ninth eclogue that the star of Caesar has appeared to gladden the fields. Virgil later writes of the period following Julius Caesar's assassination, "Never did fearsome comets so often blaze." Gurval points out that this passage in no way links a comet to Caesar's divine status, but rather links comets to his death.

Calpurnius Siculus makes mention of the comet in his epilogues as a boding sign of the civil strife that would plague Rome after Caesar's death.

It is Ovid, however, who makes the final assertion of the comet's role in Julius Caesar's deification. Ovid describes the deification of Caesar in Metamorphoses (8 AD):

Then Jupiter, the Father, spoke..."Take up Caesar's spirit from his murdered corpse, and change it into a star, so that the deified Julius may always look down from his high temple on our Capitol and forum." He had barely finished, when gentle Venus stood in the midst of the Senate, seen by no one, and took up the newly freed spirit of her Caesar from his body, and preventing it from vanishing into the air, carried it towards the glorious stars. As she carried it, she felt it glow and take fire, and loosed it from her breast: it climbed higher than the moon, and drawing behind it a fiery tail, shone as a star.

It has been argued recently that the idea of Augustus's use of the comet for his political aims largely stems from this passage.

In Shakespeare's Julius Caesar (1599), Caesar's wife remarks on the fateful morning of her husband's murder: "When beggars die there are no comets seen. The heavens themselves blaze forth the death of princes."

== Modern scholarship ==
In 1997, two scholars at the University of Illinois at Chicago (the classicist John T. Ramsey and the physicist A. Lewis Licht) published a book comparing astronomical/astrological evidence from both Han China and Rome. Their analysis, based on historical eyewitness accounts, Chinese astronomical records, astrological literature from later antiquity, and ice cores from Greenland glaciers, yielded a range of orbital parameters for the hypothetical object. They settled on a perihelion point of 0.22 AU for the object which was apparently visible with a tail from the Chinese capital Chang'an (in late May) and as a star-like object from Rome (in late July):

- May 18, 44 BC (China)
- July 23–25, 44 BC (Rome)
- Apparent magnitude: −4.0

Robert Gurval of UCLA and Brian G. Marsden of the Harvard–Smithsonian Center for Astrophysics leave the comet's very existence as an open question. Marsden notes in his foreword to Ramsey and Licht's book, "Given the circumstance of a single reporter two decades after the event, I should be remiss if I were not to consider this [i.e., the comet's non-existence] as a serious possibility."

Maik Meyer and Gary Kronk in 2025 published a paper indicating that the Great Comet of 1744 has an orbital period of about 350 years and, integrating it backwards, found possible matches for previous apparitions in 1402 (see Great Comet of 1402), 1032, 676 and 336 AD. Based on that orbit, the next previous apparition would be in the middle of 44 BC, around the time Caesar's Comet was visible. However, they noted that the observation reports contradict and considered the identification with the Great Comet of 1744 as unlikely.

== See also ==
- List of hyperbolic comets
