= Jean-Philippe Loys de Cheseaux =

Swiss astronomer (1718–1751)

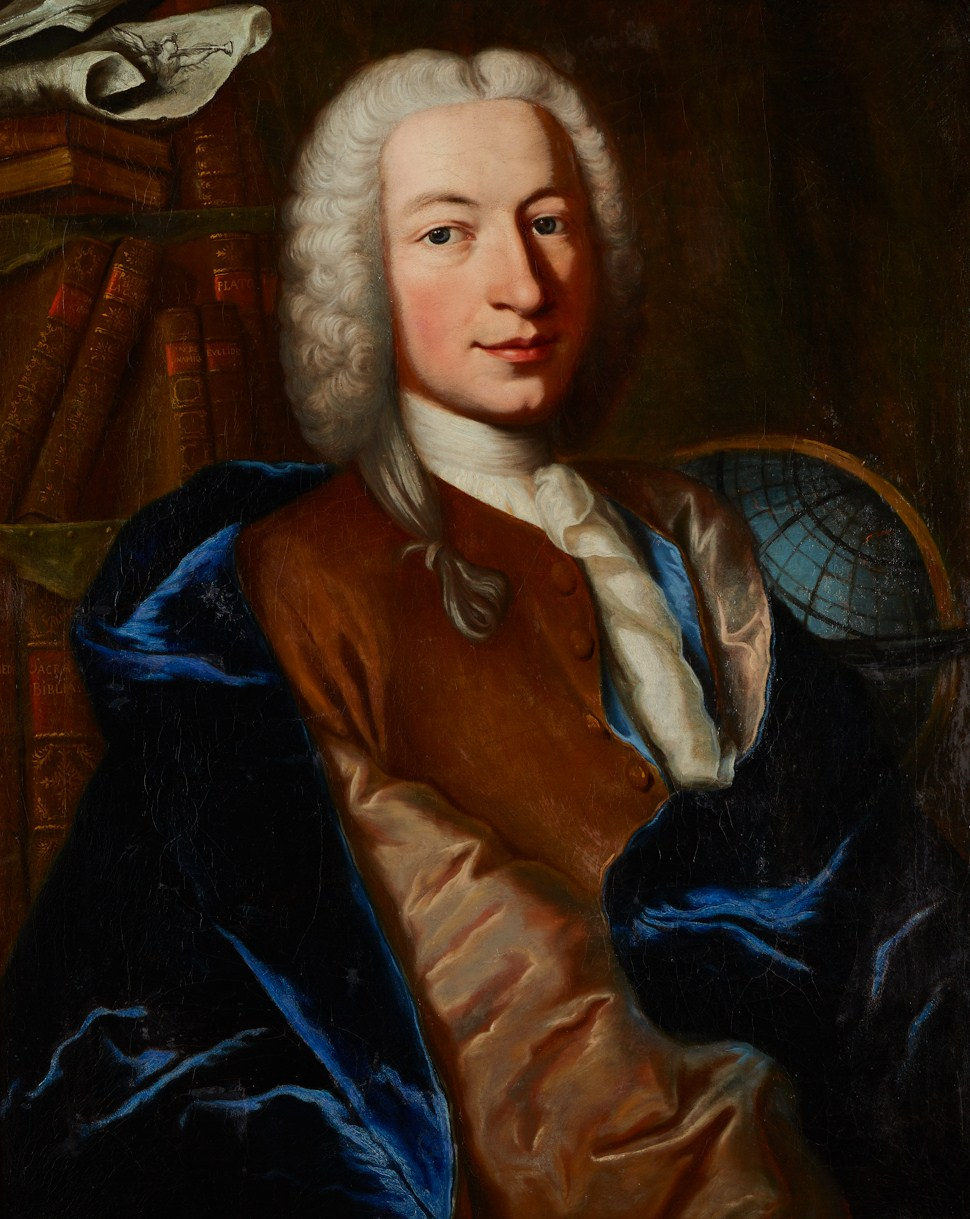
- Portrait by Jean-Pierre Henchoz, 1746
- Born: 4 May 1718; Lausanne, Switzerland
- Died: 30 November 1751 (aged 33); Paris, France
- Scientific career
- Fields: Astronomy

Jean-Philippe Loys de Cheseaux (French pronunciation: [ʒɑ̃ filip lois də ʃezo]; 4 May 1718 – 30 November 1751) was a Swiss astronomer.

== Biography ==
Loys de Cheseaux was born on 4 May 1718 in Lausanne, Vaud, to Paul-Etienne Loys de Cheseaux, a banneret, and Estienne-Judith de Crousaz. His brother was Charles-Louis Loys de Cheseaux. He was educated by his maternal grandfather, the mathematician and philosopher Jean-Pierre de Crousaz, and wrote his first essays, under the title Essais de Physique, in 1735, aged 17.

In 1736, Loys de Cheseaux installed an observatory in his father's lands in Cheseaux-sur-Lausanne. He acquired a reputation in Europe as an astronomer with the publication of his Traité de la Comète, in 1744, a treatise on his observations of the comet C/1743 X1 in which he also became one of the first to state, in its modern form, what would later be known as Olbers' paradox (that, if the universe is infinite, the night sky should be bright).

After his discovery of C/1743 (along with Dirk Klinkenberg), Loys de Cheseaux discovered the comet C/1746 P1. In 1746, he presented a list of nebulae, eight of which were his own new discoveries, to the French Academy of Sciences. The list was noted privately by Le Gentil in 1759, but only made public in 1892 by Guillaume Bigourdan.

From 1747, Loys de Cheseaux was a corresponding member of the science academies of Göttingen, Saint Petersburg and Stockholm, as well as the French Academy of Sciences and the Royal Society of London. He was offered the post of director of the St. Petersburg observatory, but declined the invitation. In 1751, Loys de Cheseaux travalled to Paris and was presented to the Academy of Sciences. There he died, after a short illness, on 30 November 1751, aged 33.

In addition to astronomy, Loys de Cheseaux researched Biblical chronology, calculating the movements of the Sun and Moon relative to descriptions in the Book of Daniel and the occurrence of solstices and equinoxes in Jerusalem at the time of the Old Testament story. In his Dissertation Chronologique (1748), Loys de Cheseaux tried to establish the date of the eclipse known as "crucifixion darkness" in order to determine the date of the crucifixion of Jesus.

== Works ==
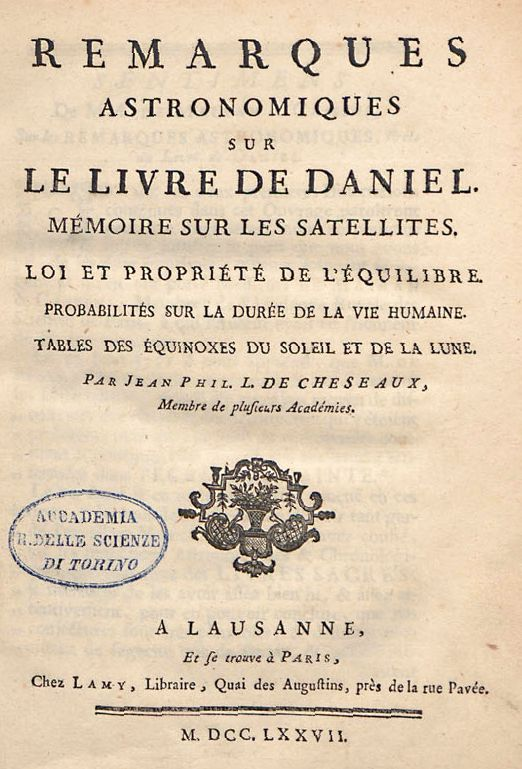
Remarques astronomiques sur le livre de Daniel, 1777

- Traité de la comete qui a paru en decembre 1743 et en janvier, fevrier et mars 1744 (in French). Lausanne: Marc Michel Bousquet & C. 1744.
- Remarques astronomiques sur le livre de Daniel (in French). Lausanne: Pierre Michel Lamy. 1777. Bibcode:1777rasl.book.....L.
