= Olof Hiorter =

Swedish astronomer

Olof Petrus (or Peter) Hiorter (or Hjorter) (1696–1750) was a Swedish astronomer. After studying in the Netherlands, he was appointed lecturer at the University of Uppsala in 1732 to fill the vacant position of Anders Celsius then on his grand tour of European observatories. From 1737 onwards, he studied together with Celsius the aurora phenomenon and a number of astronomy subjects (solar eclipse, comet like the one of 1744, latitude measurements). Hiorter was the first to connect the aurora to magnetic disturbances. Pehr Wilhelm Wargentin was his pupil.

Hiorter was elected a member of the Royal Swedish Academy of Sciences in 1745 and appointed Observator Regius - "Royal Astronomer" in 1747.
