= Battle of Simbach =

Battle of succession

- Part of the War of Austrian Succession
Date	9 May 1743
Location	Simbach am Inn, (present-day Bavaria)
Result	Austrian victory

Belligerents
Bavaria; Palatinate; Hesse-Kassel	Habsburg Monarchy

Commanders and leaders
(Electorate of Bavaria) Minucci	(Habsburg monarchy) Prince Charles Alexander of Lorraine

Strength
8,000	49 infantry battalions 9 cavalry regiments

Casualties and losses
4,000	100+

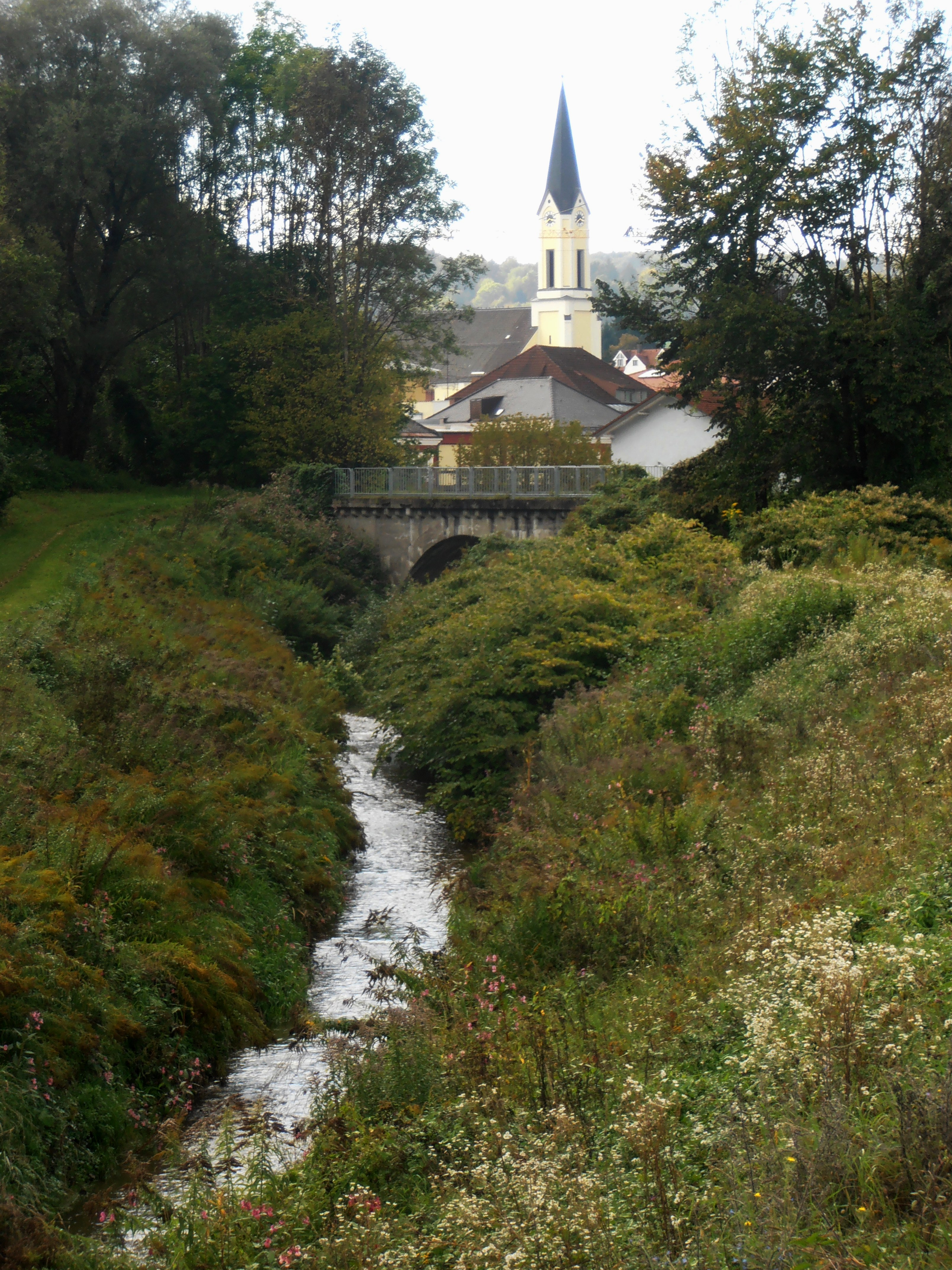
Simbach am Inn, near the battle site

The Battle of Simbach on May 9, 1743, took place during the War of Austrian Succession near Simbach am Inn. It ended with a heavy defeat of the Bavarian troops against the Austrians.

== Aftermath ==
Altogether the loss of dead and captured Bavarians, Palatines and Hessians amounted to about 4,000 men, the Austrians only lost a little over a hundred men. Simbach was completely destroyed except for one house, and the surrounding area was also devastated. Braunau had to be handed over on July 4. Soon after, the French-occupied towns of Dingolfing, Landau and Deggendorf were also taken by the Austrians.
