= Great Comet of 1744 =

Non-periodic comet

C/1743 X1 (Klinkenberg–Chéseaux) (Great Comet of 1744)
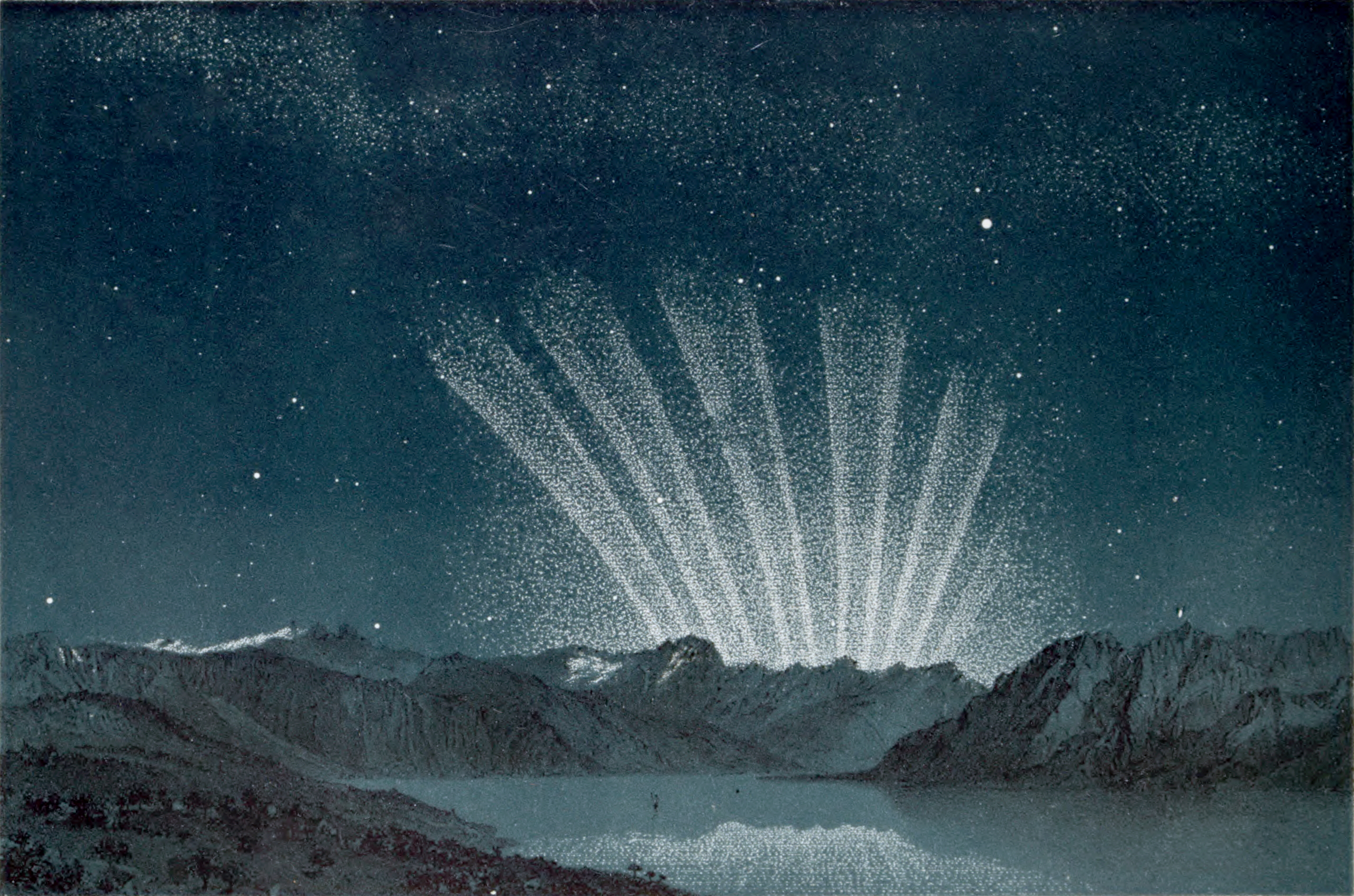
- The tails of the Great Comet of 1744, extending above the horizon before sunrise on March 8, 1744

Discovery
- Discovered by: Jan de Munck; Dirk Klinkenberg; Jean-Philippe de Chéseaux
- Discovery date: 29 November 1743

Orbital characteristics
- Observation arc: 71 days
- Number of observations: 76
- Perihelion: 0.222 AU
- Eccentricity: ~1.000
- Inclination: 47.142°
- Longitude of ascending node: 49.297°
- Argument of periapsis: 151.486°
- Last perihelion: 1 March 1744
- Next perihelion: 8 December 2097 (uncertain)

Physical characteristics
- Mean radius: 6.84 km (4.25 mi) (Note: Calculated mean radius using the formula: $\log_{10}\,(\,R\,)\ =\;0.9 +\;0.13 (\,H\,)$ Where $\,H\,$ is the comet's absolute total magnitude (M1))
- Synodic rotation period: 4.8±0.4 hours
- Comet total magnitude (M1): 0.5
- Apparent magnitude: –7.0 (1744 apparition)

The Great Comet of 1744, whose official designation is C/1743 X1, and which is also known as Comet de Chéseaux or Comet Klinkenberg–Chéseaux, was a spectacular comet that was observed during 1743 and 1744. It was discovered independently in late November 1743 by Jan de Munck, in the second week of December by Dirk Klinkenberg, and, four days later, by Jean-Philippe de Chéseaux. It became visible with the naked eye for several months in 1744 and displayed dramatic and unusual effects in the sky. Its absolute magnitude – or intrinsic brightness – of 0.5 was the sixth highest in recorded history. Its apparent magnitude may have reached as high as −7, leading it to be classified as a Great Comet. This comet is noted especially for developing a 'fan' of six tails after reaching its perihelion.

Although the orbit of the comet is usually assumed to be parabolic (i.e. to be effectively unbound), recent work has provided evidence that the comet has an orbital period of about 350 to 400 years. That work suggests that it is the same as the Great Comet of 1402, as well as comets observed in 1032, 676 and 336 AD. If that is correct, the comet could next reach perihelion in 2097, when it could put on a show.

== Observational history ==
=== Discovery ===
The comet was discovered on 29 November 1743, by Jan de Munck at Middelburg, and was independently sighted on 9 December 1743 by Klinkenberg at Haarlem, and by Chéseaux from the observatory at Lausanne on December 13. Chéseaux said it lacked a tail and resembled a nebulous star of the third magnitude; he measured the coma as five minutes across.

The comet brightened steadily as it approached perihelion. By 18 February 1744, it reportedly was as bright as the planet Venus (with an apparent magnitude of −4.6) and at this time displayed a double tail.

=== Perihelion, "six tails" ===
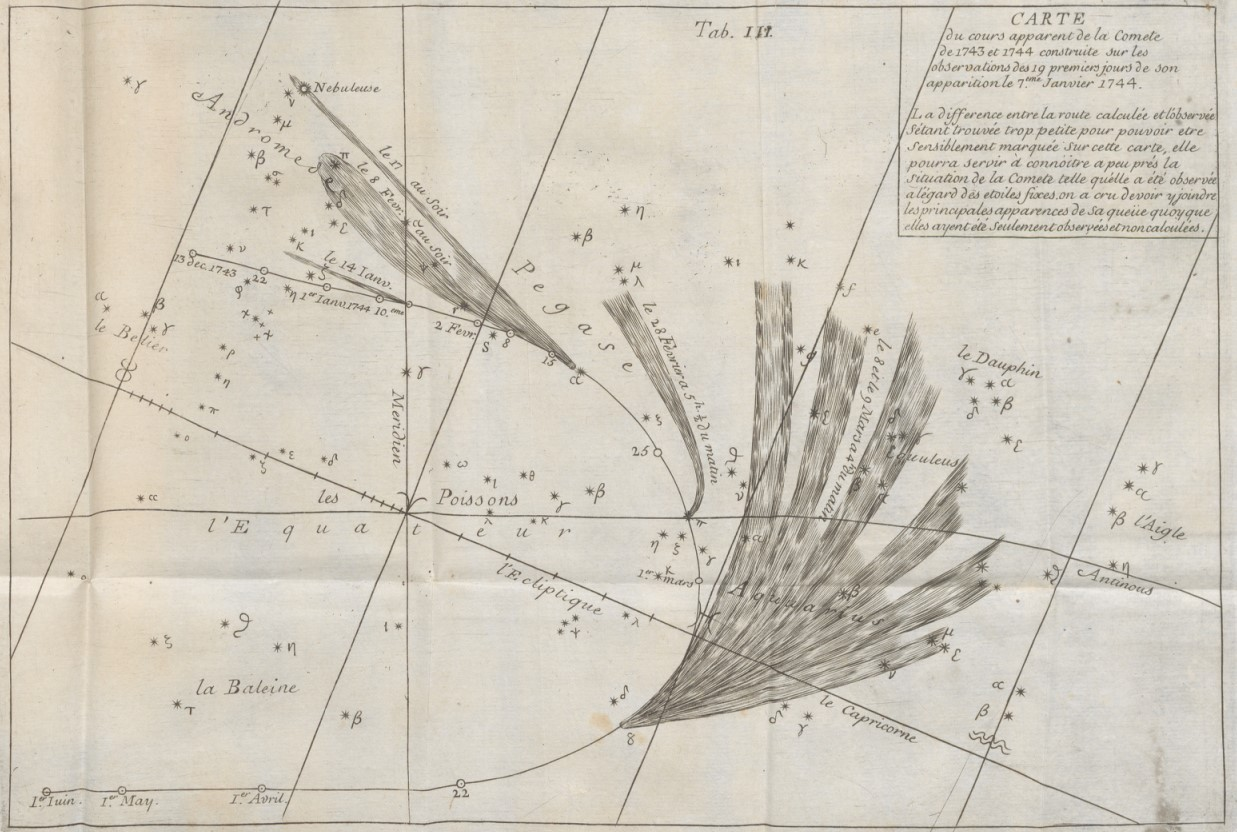
Sketch of the comet by de Chéseaux, showing the path of the comet in the sky and the comet having six tails.

The comet reached perihelion about March 1, 1744, when it was 0.2 astronomical units from the Sun. At about this time it was bright enough to be observed in daylight with the naked eye. As it moved away from perihelion, a spectacular tail developed — extending well above the horizon while the comet's head remained invisible due to the morning twilight. In early March 1744, Chéseaux and several other observers reported an extremely unusual phenomenon — a 'fan' of six separate tails rose above the horizon.

The tail structure was a puzzle to astronomers for many years. Although other comets had displayed multiple tails on occasion, the 1744 comet was unique in having six. It has been suggested that the 'fan' of tails was generated by as many as three active sources on the cometary nucleus, exposed in turn to solar radiation as the nucleus rotated. As each area is exposed to sunlight it becomes active and ejects material. The rotation period calculated by this method is 4.8±0.4 hours.

It also has been proposed that the tail phenomenon was a very prominent example of the "dust striae" seen in the tails of some comets, such as C/1975 V1 (West) and C/2006 P1 (McNaught).

=== Other observations ===
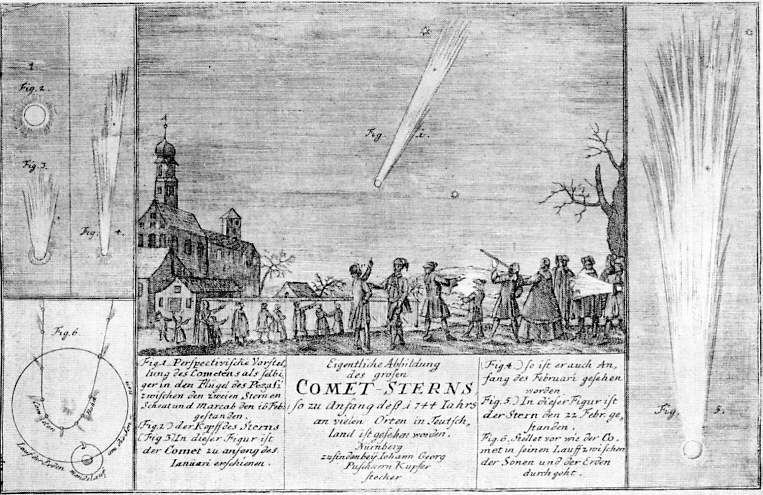
The Great Comet on 16 February 1744 over Nuremberg. An engraving illustration of "COMET-STERNS" (Comet-Stars) by astronomer & master engraver Johann Georg Puschner (1680–1749) of Comet Klinkenberg

Chéseaux, on March 9, was the last known observer in the Northern Hemisphere to see the comet, but it remained visible for observers in the Southern Hemisphere, some of whom reported a tail length of approximately 90 degrees on March 18. The comet was not seen after 22 April 1744.

In Tungkhungia Buranji, a medieval Ahom text, the comet finds mention as being seen for three successive Assamese months, Push, Magh and Phagun from 1665–1666 Saka (equivalent to 1743–1744 in the Gregorian calendar).

The comet also was noted in Japanese astronomical records in the Nihon Odai Ichiran of the Kanpō era. Researchers have found in Chinese astronomical records that some Chinese observations describe audible sounds associated with the comet, which may, if true, have resulted from the interaction of particles with the Earth's magnetosphere, as sometimes described for the aurora.

Among those who saw the comet was the thirteen-year-old Charles Messier, on whom it had a profound and inspirational effect. He went on to become one of the founding figures of modern astronomy, and later discovered many comets during his observations.

Catherine the Great, then Sophia, also observed the brilliant comet as a young girl as she was travelling to Russia to be wed.

== Orbit ==
The comet has a perihelion distance of 0.22 AU. The data collected during 1744 were used to calculate parabolic orbits. However, Olof Hiorter suggested that the Great Comet of 1402 was a previous apparition based on the appearance of the comet and roughly similar orbits, and that the comets of 1058 and 715 were also previous apparitions of the comet. Heinrich Wilhelm Matthias Olbers and Johann Holetschek agreed with this claim. Maik Meyer and Gary Kronk calculated an orbit based on the observations of the 1744 apparition without limitations in the values that indicates an eccentricity of 0.995580 and an orbital period of 354 years, while a parabolic orbit has larger residuals. Excluding the daylight observations the orbital period is calculated to be about 480 years, indicating the comet has an orbital period of a few hundred years. Based on the unrestricited orbit and including planet perturbations, Meyer and Kronk found a perihelion at about 1405.

Meyer and Kronk integrated the orbit backwards for an apparition in 1402 and compared the results with the chronicle reports of the Great Comet of 1402. They found that the reports about the location and the appearance of the comet were in agreement with an estimated perihelion on 25 March. They also searched for older apparitions and based on the backwards calculated orbits the found candidate comets in 1032, 676, 336 AD, 44 BC for previous apparitions. The comet of 1032 is described in a Chinese source indicating a perihelion in early August, when the geometry is such that observations are difficult. Based on that, the previous apparition would be the comet of 676, a bright comet observed in autumn mentioned in many European and Asian sources. The backwards integrated orbit of the 1744 comet indicates a perihelion at 4 November 676 and a previous apparition in 336, when a comet was observed, and in mid 44 BC. In 44 BC a bright comet was visible, known as Caesar's Comet, however the observation reports contradict and also do not fit well the predicted appearance.

Based on those associations, Meyer and Kronk predict the comet could return in 2097, with an estimated perihelion date assumed to be around 8 December 2097, but there are significant uncertainties.

== See also ==
- C/2024 G3 (ATLAS) – a comet that also produced dust striae phenomenon on January 2025
