= Manuela Desvalls Vergós =

Spanish nun and spy (died 1743)

Manuela "Emanuela" Desvalls Vergós (died 1743), was a Spanish nun and spy.

Desvalls Vergós was the daughter of Antoni Desvalls i de Castellbell and d’Agnès de Vergós i de Bellafilla, and the sister of Antonio Desvalls y de Vergós and Manuel Desvalls i de Vergós, governor of Cardona. Her brothers were the favorites of John of Austria the Younger, and participated on the Austrian side of Charles VI, Holy Roman Emperor, during the War of the Spanish Succession and were favored by Charles during his reign in Catalonia.

Emanuela Desvalls Vergós was placed in the convent Santa Maria de Vallbona in 1696 and took her final vows in 1707. Until 1714, she was involved in the military activity of her brothers during the war in Catalonia, and acted as their agent. During the Siege of Barcelona, Manuela was given the task to write and copy messages to boost morale in favor of the Austrian cause, and enroll agents willing to smuggle weapons and supplies to the besieged city. After the defeat at Barcelona in 1714, her brothers left Spain for Vienna.

Emanuela continued to write and secretly publish anti-Bourbon and pro-Austrian papers, refusing the Treaty of Utrecht and describing and challenging the repression under the Bourbon dynasty. In 1718, her pro-Austrian writings were found after the arrest of the pro-Austrian Francisco de Castellvi. There does not seem to have been any prosecutions against her. Her texts were published anonymously and are therefore difficult to verify.
