= Charles-Louis Loys de Cheseaux =

Swiss historian

- Born: 22 March 1730; Lausanne, Switzerland
- Died: 29 August 1789 (aged 59); Lausanne, Switzerland

Academic work
- Discipline: history
- Notable works: Discours philosophique sur la physique et l'histoire naturelle

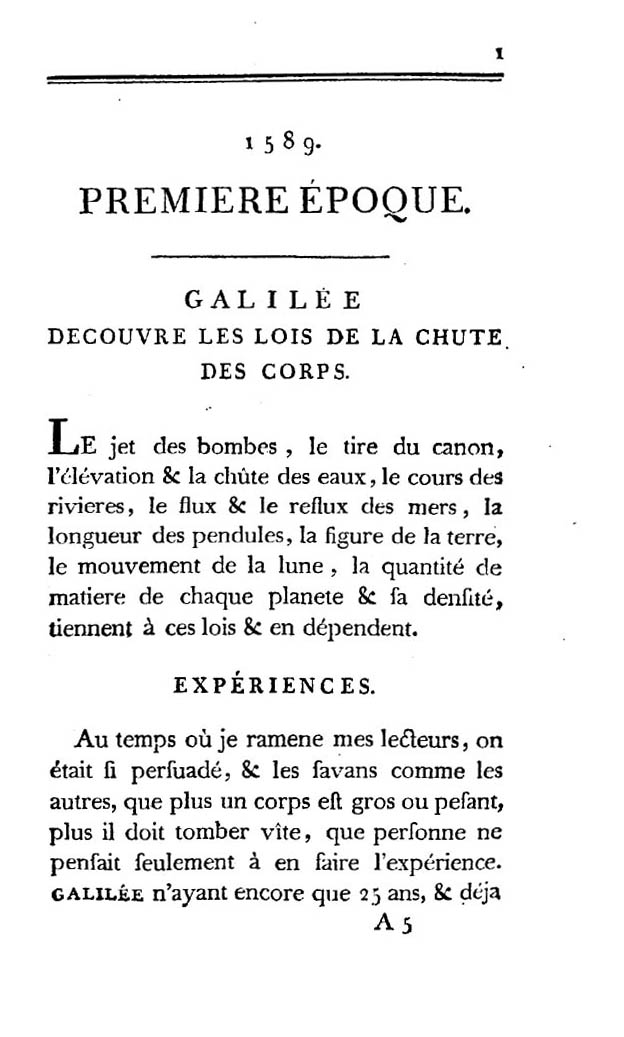
First page of the Abrégé chronologique pour servir a l'histoire de la physique jusqu'a nos jours, 1786

Charles-Louis Loys de Cheseaux (1730 – 1789) was a Swiss historian.

== Life ==
Born in Lausanne, he was a member of Bern's economic society.

Among his works is a history of physics in two volumes. Some of his works were translated in various languages in Europe.

== Works ==
- Discours philosophique sur la physique et l'histoire naturelle (in French). Lausanne: Antoine Chapuis. 1762.
- Discorso filosofico sulla fisica e storia naturale (in Italian). Tübingen: Stamperia Reissiana. 1777.
- Abrégé chronologique pour servir a l'histoire de la physique jusqu'a nos jours (in French). Vol. 1. Strasbourg: P. J. Dannbach. 1786.
- Abrégé chronologique pour servir a l'histoire de la physique jusqu'a nos jours (in French). Vol. 2. Strasbourg: P. J. Dannbach. 1787.
- Abrégé chronologique pour servir a l'histoire de la physique jusqu'a nos jours (in French). Vol. 3. Strasbourg: P. J. Dannbach. 1789.
- Abrégé chronologique pour servir a l'histoire de la physique jusqu'a nos jours (in French). Vol. 4. Strasbourg: P. J. Dannbach. 1789.
- Loys, Charles de (1798). Chronologische Geschichte der Naturlehre (in German). Leipzig.

== See also ==
- Galileo Galilei

== Bibliography ==
- Silvanus P. Thompson (1922). Bibliographical history of electricity & magnetism. C. Griffin & Company Limited.
