= Battle of Koroncó =

Battle during Rákóczi War of Independence

- Part of Rákóczi's War of Independence
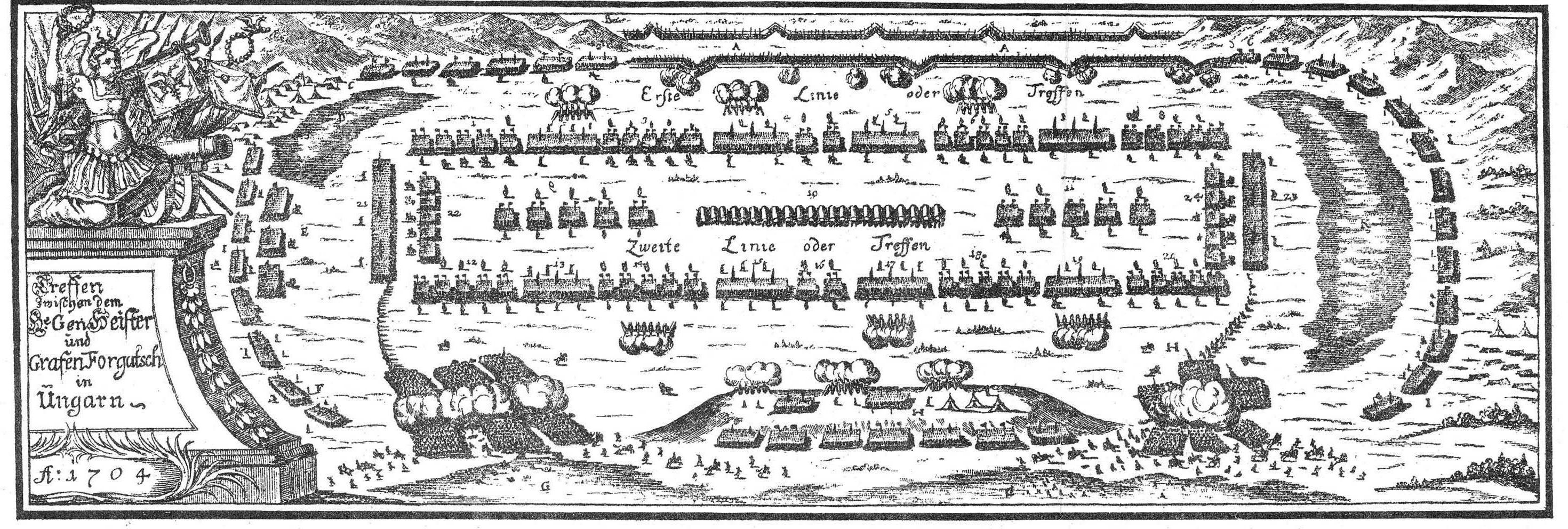
- The Battle of Koroncó
Date	13 June 1704
Location	Koroncó, Hungary
Result	Austrian victory

Belligerents
Kurucs (Kingdom of Hungary) with Slovaks and Burgenland Croats	Habsburg monarchy Holy Roman Empire; Kingdom of Prussia; Kingdom of Denmark; Kingdom of Croatia; Vojvodian Serbs

Commanders and leaders
Simon Forgách general Antal Esterházy general	Sigbert Heister general Peter Viard, colonel

Strength
c. 17,000–18,000	3,234 infantry, 2,884 cavalry

Casualties and losses
2,000 dead	100 dead

The Battle of Koroncó took place on 13 June 1704 at Koroncó in Győr County, Hungary between the Kurucs (Hungarians) and the army of Habsburg Empire (Germans, Danes, Serbs, Croats). The Kuruc army was defeated in the battle. Although the Austrian army retired to Austria after the battle, the Kuruc positions in Transdanubia remained uncertain until 1705 because of the fiasco near Koroncó.

== Prelude ==
General Simon Forgách had invaded Transdanubia in May 1704. General Sándor Károlyi won the battle of Smolenice and László Ocskay defeated the Danish auxiliaries in the battle of Biskupice. In addition the Kuruc forces raided in Austria, Moravia and Styria.

During these operations, the Kuruc forces tried to liberate Transdanubia and oust the Austrian army from Hungary. Two Kuruc armies und Forgách and under Károlyi operated near the Rába and Danube rivers. Károlyi and Forgách sought to unite and join forces to beat the army of Sigbert Heister. Vienna became afraid of a Kuruc attack on the capital and assigned general Heister to prevent this. But Heister's army encamped near Koroncó on 10 June and fearing encirclement, did not advance further northwest. Luckily, Károlyi also did not move to Győr.

== Opposing forces ==
=== Kurucs ===
Forgách's army was composed of some 17–18,000 fighters. The elite corps of the army were 3,000 Veteran Haiduks from the Great Turkish War. The other forces were irregular, untrained and very undisciplined soldiers. Antal Esterházy was the commander of the Kuruc cavalry

Károlyi's army was composed of 4,000 men near Győr, but didn't receive orders from general Miklós Bercsényi to help Forgách's army.

The Kuruc army was formed by Hungarians, Slovaks and some Croats (Burgenland Croats).

=== Austrians ===
Heister's army was constituted by forces from Austria, Holy Roman Empire, Prussia, Denmark, Croatia and Serbs from Southern-Hungary, ca. 3600–6100 men. Heister fortified his camp with entrenchments and the Serbian cavalry repulsed the raiding attacks of the Kurucs.

The composition of the army:

- 473 Deutschmeister infantry
- 450 infantry under Heister
- 465 infantry under colonel Virmond
- 144 Prussian infantry under Scipio Bagni
- 129 infantry from the Herzogtum Holstein-Plön
- 500 Danish infantry from the regiment of the deceased Christian Frederik Haxthausen (d. 1694)
- 500 Danish infantry under Colonel Masting
- 573 Danish infantry under Colonel Ende
- 884 cuirassiers under Georges de La Tour
- 800 dragoons under Leopold Schlick
- 800 dragoons from Bayreuth
- 400 Croatian and Serbian lighthorsemen

== The battle ==
Heister was the initiator in the battle: on 13 June the Austrian army launched an attack against the Kuruc forces. Forgách with 11,000 men held his position, and the remaining 6–7,000 men began the encirclement of the enemy.

The Kurucs routed the Serbian-Croatian cavalry in the skirmisher battle. Esterházy skillfully encircled Heister's army, but the numerical superiority of the Austrian guns kept the Kuruc forces at a distance. The Austrian and Danish infantry fired so fast, that the Hungarian irregular soldiers recoiled, although the retreat of the Serbian auxiliaries also broke the front of Heister's army.

Forgách ordered a final attack against the Austrian cannons, although the Kuruc cavalry was not formed for such an attack. The Austrians guns disrupted the Kuruc cavalry. Forgách retreated and confusion arose among the Kuruc army. Heister then launched a counter-attack against the Kuruc infantry and scattered the Hungarians.

== Aftermath ==
Ca. 2000 Kurucs were killed in the battle, the casualties of the Austrian army was 100 killed.

Heister felt that Vienna was at risk (Károlyi's army was still intact) and therefore retreated in Lower Austria. But Károlyi didn't march into Austria. On 4 July Károlyi's army with the Hungarian Slovenes triumphed near Szentgotthárd over the Styrian army, nevertheless the Kurucs were unable to hold on to Transdanubia.

The battle of Koroncó proved that an irregular Kuruc army was unable to win a great open battle against a regular Imperial army.

János Bottyán in 1705 permanently liberated Transdanubia when he triumphed over Hannibal Heister in the second battle of Szentgotthárd.

== Sources ==
- Bánlaky József: A magyar nemzet hadtörténete – A koroncói csata 1704. június 13-án

== Literature ==
- Magyarország hadtörténete, Zrínyi katonai kiadó, Budapest 1985. szerk.: Liptai Ervin ISBN 963-326-337-9
