= Kolárovo Castle =

Castle in Gúta, Slovakia

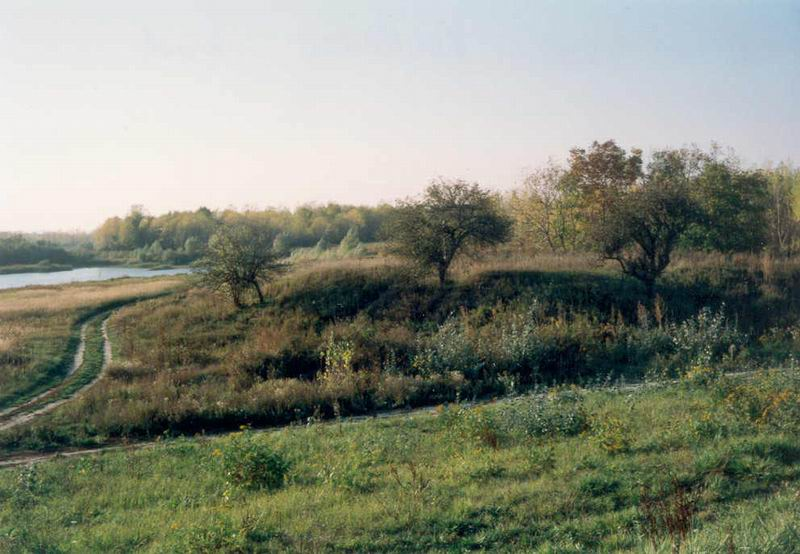
The site of the former fort near Kolárovo. Today, only mounds remain.

Fort Gúta was a fort near the town of Gúta (modern day Kolárovo) in what is today Slovakia. As of today, no archaeological excavations have been done on its site.

The fort played a minor role during its history compared to the fortresses of two nearby cities, Érsekújvár and Komárom (modern day Nové Zámky and Komárno, respectively) had larger fortresses that played more important roles during past centuries. Specifically, the Siege of Érsekújvár in 1663 was a major event during the Austro-Turkish War, and the fortress of Komárom was the last to resist Austrian and Russian forces during the Hungarian Revolution of 1848.

== Description ==
The original castle from the 14th century was protected with two palisades. These wooden walls ran parallel to each other and were reinforced with wickers. The space between the palisades was filled with mud and dirt for reinforcement. For additional protection, a moat was constructed around the castle.

== History ==
Fort Gúta was built where the Kolárovo castle stood before it. According to tradition, Mary, Queen of Hungary ordered that castle to be built around 1349 near the confluence of rivers Váh and the Little Danube to protect fords and trade routes. However, Mary was born in 1371, 22 years later, and was crowned in 1382; therefore, it is more likely that the castle was either built decades later or it was built on orders from Mary's predecessor, Louis I.

It has been repaired and renovated several times according to the period requirements. At the beginning of Turkish occupation the fortress was quickly repaired by the local captain Gregor Martonosi Pesthényi in 1527, to protect it from the approaching army of John Zápolya, supported by the Ottoman Empire. That year an army commander of Zápolya, Gáspár Ráskay drew into Guta and conquered the town. Soon afterwards, the fortress fell into the hands of the imperial Austrian army again.

Between 1584 and 1594 the fortress was strengthened with the help of the Italian army engineers. At the time when Gabriel Bethlen was conquering the fortress in Komárno, local Walloon and French soldiers escaped.

After the Ottoman Army conquered nearby Érsekújvár in 1663, the Kingdom of Hungary, then part of the Habsburg monarchy, decided to modernize the fort. In 1664, it was rebuilt in as a Baroque-style star fort with four triangular bastions.

Between 1662 and 1664 being afraid of new attacks of Turks, the fortress was modernized again. Inside there were stone accommodation houses and stone stores for gunpowder and guns. At that time there were 130 mercenaries behind the walls under the command of Matej Fröhwirtha. In the spring of 1707 at the time of the Rákóczi uprising, the count Guido Starhemberg performed the fortification worth 6090 forints with the help of the army engineer Fischer.

The kuruc general János Bottyán stayed nearby the town for four times. On 12 July 1708 he conquered the fortress with the help of heavy artillery and captured local mercenaries. After fighting the fortress was destroyed and kuruc soldiers retreated with the words "Let it be the residence of frogs since now". Although the fortress was repaired later, its defamatory name Békavár (Frog castle) was preserved. Danish garrison was located there by general Heister. In the 1840s the fortress had no importance, only used once by the army of General Artúr Görgei, which had a rest there after a lost battle.

== Bibliography ==
- Juhász, Árpád (1996). Gúta és környéke a múlt századokban [Gúta and its surroundings during past centuries] (in Hungarian). Bratislava: Kalligram.
- Vende, Aladár (1907). "Gúta" (PDF). In Dr. Borovszky, Samu (ed.). Magyarország vármegyéi és városai, Magyarország monográfiája [Counties and cities of Hungary, a monograph of Hungary] (in Hungarian). Vol. X: Komárom vármegye és Komárom. Budapest: Országos Monográfia Társaság. pp. 64–69.
