= Battle of Romhány =

Part of the Rákóczi's War of Independence

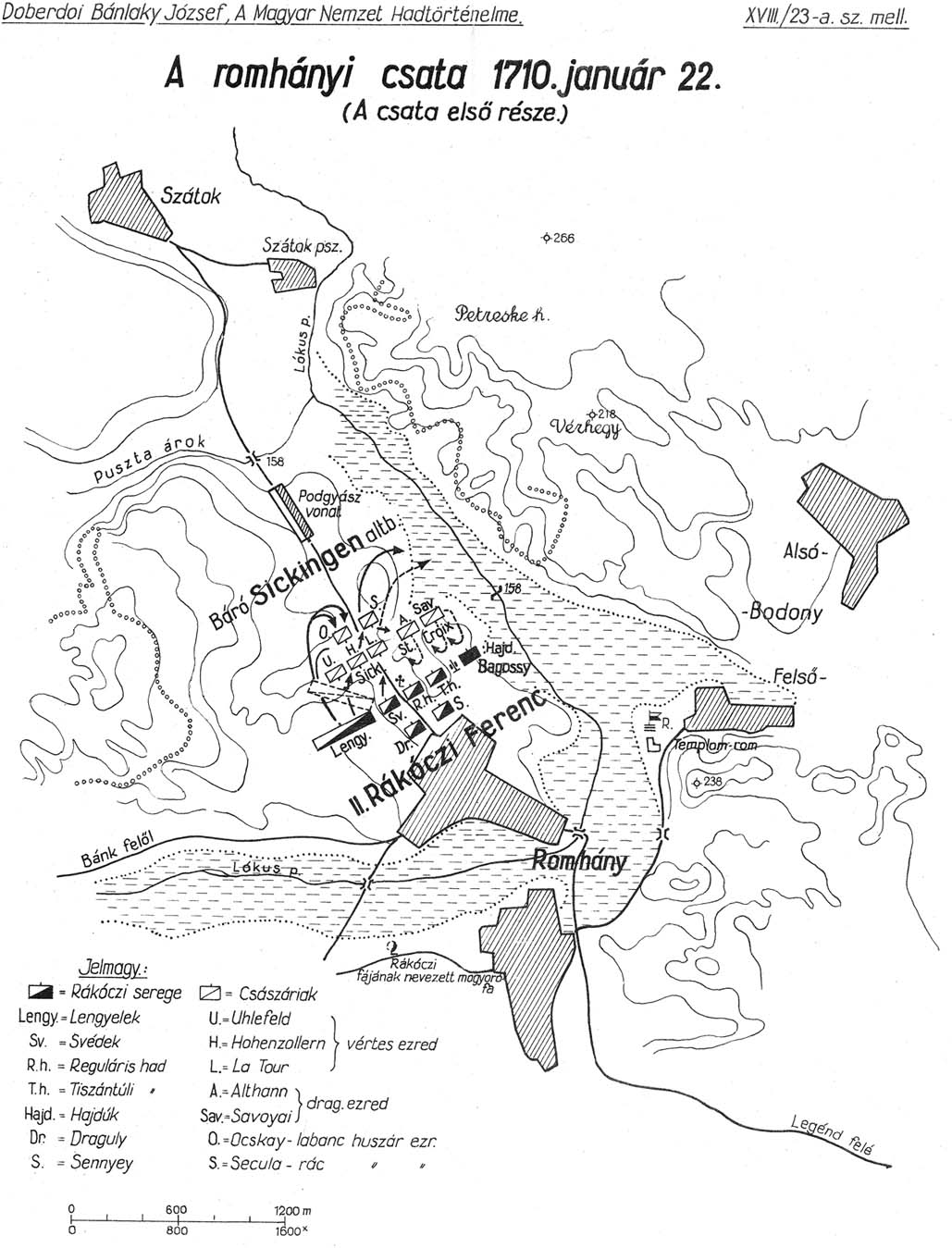
Date	22 January 1710
Location	near the villages of Romhány, Szátok, Érsekvadkert 47°56′N 19°15′E
Result	Inconclusive

Belligerents
Kuruc Army of Francis II Rákóczi; Sweden and Poland auxiliaries	Habsburg Imperial Army

Commanders and leaders
Francis II Rákóczi; Sándor Károlyi; Mihály Csáky	Johann von Sickingen; Joseph Albert Saint-Croix

Strength
12,000 infantry and cavalrymen	Around 1,500 cavalrymen

Casualties and losses
350–400 dead or wounded	700–800 dead or wounded
- Location within Hungary Battle of Romhány (Europe)

The Battle of Romhány (Battle of Szátok or Battle of Érsekvadkert) is one of the last battles of the Rákóczi War of Independence, which was fought on 22 January 1710 between Romhány and Szátok or Érsekvadkert in Nógrád counties.

== The Battle ==
After the decisive defeat suffered in the Battle of Trenčín, the Kurucs were continuously pushed out of the western part of the country. At the turn of 1709–10, the Austrian armies continued their gradual advance in the territory of Nógrád County under the command of Count Johann von Sickingen.

Rákóczi's army, reinforced with Swedish and Polish troops was marching towards Érsekújvár, when they were intercepted by a 1,500-man cavalry unit led by von Sickingen, who underestimated the number of Hungarian troops.

The Kurucs, with an 8-to-1 advantage, overwhelmed the Imperials and were close to victory, when their undisciplined units began to plunder and disintegrated. This allowed the Imperial troops to regroup and turn the tide of the battle until both sides retreated.

== Consequences ==
The remaining Hungarian, Polish and Swedish units gathered on the south side of the stream, and the imperial ones gathered near Érsekvadkert. The Swedes and Poles wanted to persuade Rákóczi to launch a new attack, but he, seeing the poor performance of his troops, decided against it. von Sickingen had suffered heavy losses (half of his army) and was also unable to attack with his exhausted troops, so the battle ended.

Both sides regarded the battle as their own victory. Today, it can be considered a draw. Despite their initial success, the Kuruc troops, who outnumbered the enemy eight (8!) times, could not defeat the well-trained Imperials due to their lack of discipline.
According to György Ottlyk, head master of Rákóczi: Last Wednesday, we beat Habsburg gloriously, but we ignominiously ran away from the battlefield. Although the losses of the Imperials were greater in number and proportion, at the end of the battle they still dominated the battlefield. However, Rákóczi's army did not break up, so the Austrians could not make good use of their situation. In fact, the prince also achieved his original goal: he managed to bring supplies to Érsekújvár.

== Commemoration ==
The monument to the battle stands next to the road leading from Romhány to Szátok, on the edge of the village. The 8-meter high obelisk was inaugurated in 1932 and was built by Dezső Magos based on the plans of János Istók. On the top, there is a turul bird, on the side there are reliefs of Rákóczi and Károlyi, as well as Hungarian, Polish and Swedish commemorations.

Another monument to the battle stands next to the road leading Romhány to Kétbodony.
