= Battle of Biskupice =

1704 battle

- Part of Rákóczi's War of Independence
Date	21 April 1704
Location	Gutta, Kingdom of Hungary (today Podunajské Biskupice, Slovakia)
Result	Kuruc (Hungarian) victory

Belligerents
Kurucs (Kingdom of Hungary)	Denmark-Norway

Commanders and leaders
László Ocskay brigadier Lőrinc Pekry general	Colonel Peter Viard; Major Adam Frederik Trampe

Strength
Unknown	1,400

Casualties and losses
Unknown	Heavy

The Battle of Biskupice (Hungarian: Püspöki csata; German: Schlacht bei Bischdorf; Slovak: Bitka pri Biskupiciach) took place between the Kuruc (Hungarians) and the Danish auxiliaries of the Habsburg army on 21 April 1704.

== The battle ==
In March 1704, the Austrian commander Hannibal Heister merged with other Imperial troops (Germans, Danes, Serbs) near Komárom (present-day Komárno, Slovakia). The Austrian plan was to clean the Great Rye Island from Kuruc troops. However, this region had joined Rákóczi's rebellion in 1703, and Kuruc forces now threatened Komárom, Pressburg and the Moravian border.

After General Johann von Ritschan had to retreat from Pressburg (Bratislava) to Moravia, on orders from Vienna in order to better secure the Moravian border and Moravia, Heister sent German Colonel Viard and Danish Major Adam Frederik Trampe to Pressburg with an army of 1,400 men, mostly Danes, to replace him.

The Kurucs under Lőrinc Pekry and László Ocskay (by instruction of general Miklós Bercsényi) attacked by surprise the marching Danes near Püspöki (today Podunajské Biskupice, Slovakia) inflicting quite heavy losses on them. However, they could not prevent the surviving Danes from reaching Pressburg.

The Kuruc army also stormed the ramparts near Gutta (present-day Kolárovo, Slovakia).
On 28 April, in the battle of Nárazd, Heister pushed back the Kuruc army.

== Sources ==
- Bánlaky József: A magyar nemzet hadtörténelme – Heister május havi hadműveletei gróf Bercsényi Miklós és gróf Eszterházy Antal ellen.
- A Csallóköz rövid története
- Et dansk korps i østrigsk tjeneste 1704-09 (milhist.dk)
