= Battle of Zólyom =

Battle in Rákóczi's War of Independence

- Part of Rákóczi's War of Independence
Date	15 November 1703
Location	Zólyom, Upper Hungary (now Zvolen, Slovakia)
Result	Kuruc (Hungarian) victory

Belligerents
Kurucs (Kingdom of Hungary) with Slovak and Rusyn rebels Kingdom of France; Polish and Ruthenian mercenaries, and Moravian artillerymen	Habsburg Empire; Denmark-Norway; Vojvodian Serbs; Royalists

Commanders and leaders
Miklós Bercsényi general László Ocskay brigadeer Sándor Károlyi general	Simon Forgách general János Bottyán general Antal Esterházy general

Strength
c. 15,000	Unknown

The Battle of Zólyom (Hungarian: Zólyomi csata, German: Schlacht bei Altsohl, Slovak: Bitka pri Zvolene) took place between the Kurucs and the army of Habsburg monarchy on 15 November 1703 at Zólyom in Kingdom of Hungary (now Zvolen, Slovakia). General Miklós Bercsényi defeated an Austrian army under Simon Forgách. Forgách went over to the Kuruc side in 1704.

== Prelude ==
On 15 June Francis II Rákóczi sparked off the war of independence against Emperor Leopold I. First, Rákóczi found little support in Hungary and also the nobility and peasants fought against the Kurucs. His army commander Miklós Bercsényi soon brought mercenaries from Poland, Moldavia and the Ruthenian (Western Ukrainian) regions. The Kuruc forces and his mercenaries (with the Slovak and Rusyn minorities) pushed forward towards the Austrian border. On 17 September Levice was captured by the Kurucs but the Austrian army recaptured it on 31 October.

== Opposing forces ==
László Ocskay brigadier joined Bercsényi after the capture of Levice. The Kuruc and Austrian army was mostly cavalry. The Kuruc forces have irregular Hungarian and Slovak horsemen, some regular horsemen, well-trained Polish and Ruthenian cavalry, some thousand veteran Hajduks from the Great Turkish War, French officiers and soldiers, and Moravian artillerymen with obsolete guns. Bercsényi's lieutenants were Sándor Károlyi and Ocskay.

The Austrian army was composed of two regiment infantry with muskets, some platoons of Serbian fusiliers from Vojvodina, Hungarian Royalists and Danish dragoons. Its commanders were also Hungarians: Forgách, Bottyán the Blind and Antal Esterházy (all later became Kuruc commanders).

In both camps there were disagreements between the commanders. Another Austrian army was in Bystrica under command of Leopold Schlick, who just celebrated his name day, and who had no plans to assist Forgáchs army.

== Battle ==
The Kuruc and Austrian army observed each other for a long time. The thirst tormented the troops, as there was little water available. Before the battle, Bottyán and Ocskay dueled, and both were injured. In the battle, the Kuruc forces repulsed the Austrians and their allies.

After the battle, the remaining Austrians took refuge in Zvolen castle. Bercsényi tried to starve them. During the night, most of the army tried to break out of the castle. But Ocskay attacked the Austrians and destroyed them. Very few soldiers reached the camp of Schlick in Bystrica.

== Aftermath ==
The wounded János Bottyán remained in the Zvolen castle for three weeks. On 7 December, the Austrians surrendered in exchange for a free passage. The Kurucs occupied the country between Levice and Zvolen, and in several following battles defeated the Austrian, Danish and Serbian forces.

== Sources ==
- Zólyom – vártörténet (magyar-varak.hu)
- Jókai Mór: Szeretve mind a vérpadig (mek.oszk.hu)
