= Kolárovo =

Kolárovo Gúta
- Municipality
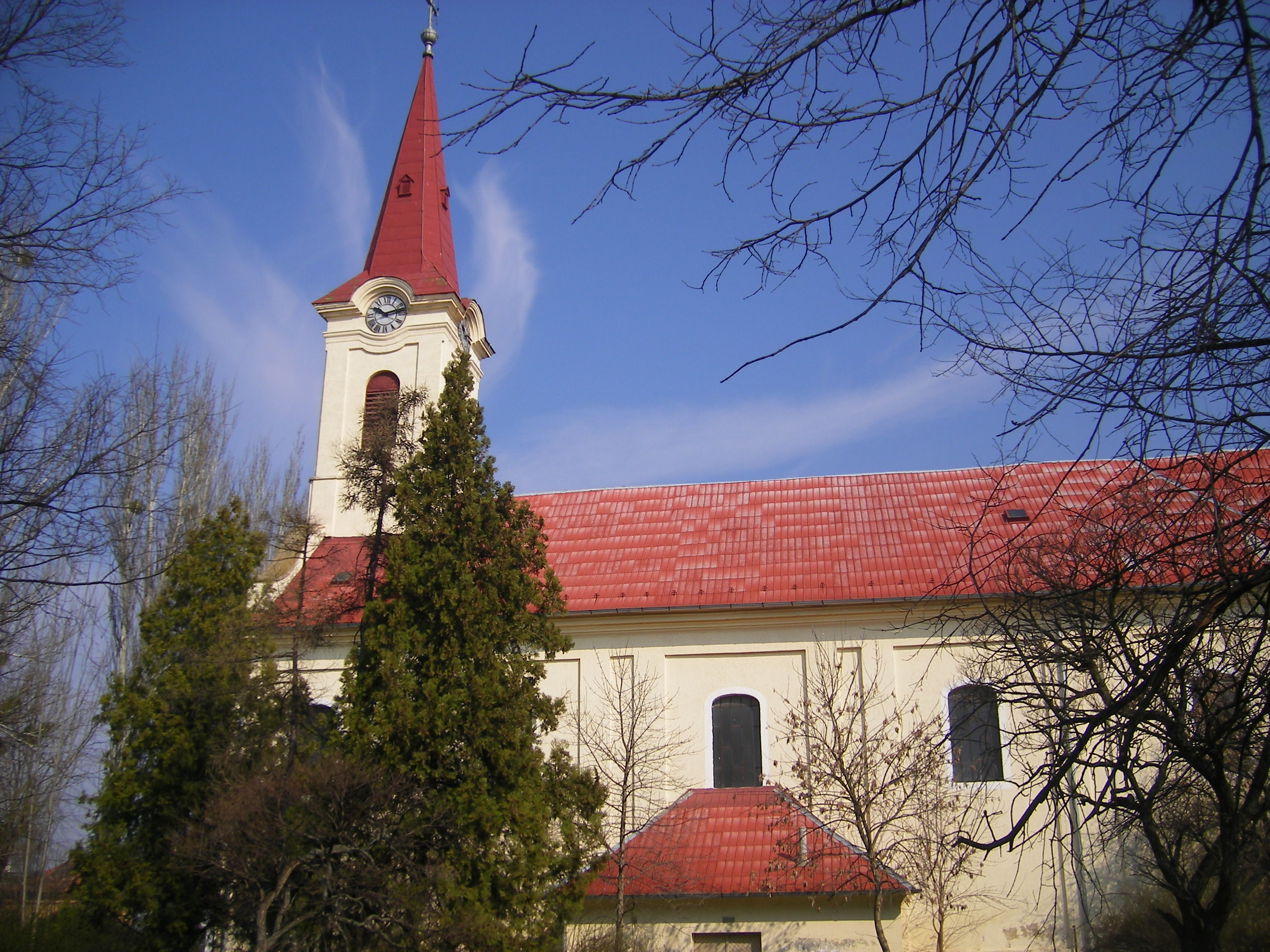
- Church of the Assumption of the Virgin Mary

- Flag Coat of arms
- Interactive map of Kolárovo
- Location of Kolárovo in the Nitra Region Location of Kolárovo in Slovakia
- Coordinates: 47.92°N 18.00°E
- Country: Slovakia
- Region: Nitra Region
- District: Komárno District
- First mentioned: 1268

Government
  - Mayor: Béla Halász (SMK-MKP)

Area
  - Total: 106.82 km^{2} (41.24 sq mi)
- Elevation: 110 m (360 ft)

Population (2025)
  - Total: 10,381
- Time zone: UTC+1 (CET)
  - Summer (DST): UTC+2 (CEST)
- Postal code: 946 03
- Area code: +421 35
- Vehicle registration plate (until 2022): KN
- Website: www.kolarovo.sk

Kolárovo (before 1948: Guta; Hungarian: Gúta or earlier Gutta) is a town in the south of Slovakia near the town of Komárno. It is an agricultural center with 11,000 inhabitants.

== Basic information ==
The town of Kolárovo is located in the Podunajská nížina (Danubian Lowland) at the confluence of the Váh and Little Danube Rivers. The western part of the plane land is on Žitný ostrov, the medium part on boggy flats of the Little Danube, Váh, and Váh Danube Rivers, the eastern part with many old shoulders and inland embankments at the flat of the Váh and Nitra Rivers. The town comprises six neighborhoods: center, Částa (Császta), Kráľka (Királyrét), Veľký Ostrov (Nagysziget), Örtény and Pačérok (Pacsérok).

According to the 2021 census, out of 10,572 there were 7,839 (74,15 %) Hungarians, 2,152 (20,36 %) Slovaks and 581 (5,49 %) others. Kolárovo belongs to the largest towns of the lower part of the Žitný ostrov.

Parts
Part	Latitude	Longitude	Feet north	Inches north	Feet east	Inches east
Částa	47	54	39	16	57	54
Čierny Chrbát	47	57	56	17	38	14
Kolárovo	47	55	1	17	59	44
Kráľka	47	47	1	17	25	44
Pačérok	47	55	60	18	10	0
Veľká Gúta	47	55	0	18	12	60
Veľký Ostrov	46	51	20	18	59	44

== Geography ==
The municipality lies at an altitude of 110 metres (360 ft) and covers an area of 106.82 km^{2} (41.24 sq mi) (2025).

== History ==
The village was mentioned for the first time in 1268 and during its existence it has changed its name several times (Old Guta, Big Guta, Little Guta).

According to a local tradition, the surrounding area was populated by Jasz people from the Tisza river regions during the Árpád dynasty, which ruled the Kingdom of Hungary from 1000 to 1301.

Other facts suggest that the area of Kolárovo was donated by King Ladislaus IV, the Cumanian. According to them, it was King Ladislaus I of Hungary, who delimited the area of the town to the extent of 56,000 acres (22,662 ha) by his bill.

A 1268 letter by King Béla IV of Hungary was the first to mention present-day Kolárovo. The letter called Kolárovo "villa Guta," and stated that its territory was owned by the archdiocese of Esztergom. Various documents confirm that villa Guta continued to fall under the tutelage of the archdiocese as of 1281, 1349, 1489 and 1550–1554.

However, these landlords never became favoured among the inhabitants of Guta who revolted from time to time against them and other lords. The inhabitants of the town also suffered a lot during the war. In 1311, Chellus, an armiger of Matthew III Csák, destroyed the villages of Guta, Nesvady a Zemné with his horde.

The first village in this territory was called Little Guta (Hungarian: Kis Gúta; Slovak: Malá Gúta) and it was situated on the right bank of the river Váh, next to the river Nitra. This settlement was also called Old Guta (mentioned in 1268).

In the 14th century, the second settlement, called Great Guta (Hungarian: Nagy Gúta; Slovak: Veľká Gúta), was established.

In the past, the "Frog Castle" (Hungarian: Békavár; Slovak: Žabí hrad) stood on the land of the village. It was built under the rule of Queen Mary in 1349 to protect fords and a business route.

After the Battle of Mohács, the inhabitants of the two villages, being afraid of the Turks, moved to a safer place on the right bank of the Little Danube, to the Žitný ostrov, where present-day Kolárovo is situated. In 1573, the village was plundered by the Turkish beg of Esztergom (Strigonia). At this time, Great Guta had already been destroyed together with its old church, although the village had partially been protected by embankments which were a part of the fortress system of Kolárovo.

In 1551, the village received town status. It was a fortified market town and it also obtained several privileges (to organize fairs, stock markets, etc.). It was under Ottoman rule between 1552 and 1595 and again between 1662 and 1685. According to the tax census of Estergon (Esztergom) Sanjak in 1570, 101 people were registered in 40 houses in Nagy Gúta and 19 people registered in 17 houses in Kis Gúta. In the tax census of Uyvar Eyalet in 1664, 44 poll tax payers were registered in only 27 households in Nagy Gúta, and 32 poll tax payers in 17 households in Kis Gúta.

In 1669, Turkish units burned the eastern part of Kolárovo. Between 1848 and 1849 at the time of national-liberating fights, the retreating Austrian troops fired on the town after the battles they had won at Pered (now:Tešedíkovo) and Žihrác.

Guta was part of the Csallóköz district in Komárom County of the Kingdom of Hungary until becoming part of Czechoslovakia in 1918. It was retaken briefly by the Hungarian Soviet Republic in 1919. Hungary regained Guta with the First Vienna Award in 1938, but it was returned to Czechoslovakia in 1945. It was renamed as Kolárovo in honour of Ján Kollár, a Slovak writer and scientist, in 1948. The renaming was carried out against the will of the town's population and as part of suppressing the Hungarian ethnicity in Slovakia.

== Important occurrences of names of the city ==
- 1268 - Villa Gutta
- 1349 - Guta
- 1948 - Kolárovo

== Population ==
Population statistic (10 years)
Year	1995	2005	2015	2025
Count	11,036	10,747	10,614	10,381
Difference		−2.61%	−1.23%	−2.19%

Population statistic
Year	2024	2025
Count	10,404	10,381
Difference		−0.22%

It has a population of 10,381 people (31 December 2025).

=== Ethnicity ===
Census 2021 (1+%)
Ethnicity	Number	Fraction
Hungarian	8086	76.48%
Slovak	2348	22.2%
Not found out	626	5.92%
Total	10,572	

In year 2021 was 10,572 people by ethnicity 8086 as Hungarian, 2348 as Slovak, 626 as Not found out, 58 as Czech, 54 as Romani, 13 as Croatian, 11 as Other, 7 as Russian, 6 as Polish, 5 as Vietnamese, 5 as Austrian, 4 as German, 3 as Chinese, 3 as Italian, 3 as Greek, 1 as Ukrainian, 1 as Turkish, 1 as Serbian and 1 as Rusyn.

Note on population: The difference values of population numbers in the table "Population statistic" and in the sections "Ethnicity" & "Religion" is caused by the use of various statistical methods.

=== Religion ===
Census 2021 (1+%)
Religion	Number	Fraction
Roman Catholic Church	5749	54.38%
None	3501	33.12%
Not found out	542	5.13%
Calvinist Church	322	3.05%
Evangelical Church	207	1.96%
Total	10,572	

In year 2021 was 10,572 people by religion 5749 from Roman Catholic Church, 3501 from None, 542 from Not found out, 322 from Calvinist Church, 207 from Evangelical Church, 71 from Greek Catholic Church, 60 from Christian Congregations in Slovakia, 54 from Jehovah's Witnesses, 14 from Other and not ascertained christian church, 10 from Other, 9 from Islam, 7 from Eastern Orthodox Church, 7 from United Methodist Church, 7 from Buddhism, 6 from Ad hoc movements, 4 from Old Catholic Church and 2 from Baptists Church.

== Kolárovo "Békevár" Fortress ==
The fortress was built at the place of the castle of Queen Mary of Hungary. In comparison with the large fortresses in Nové Zámky and Komárom, it has always played a less important role in the town's history. It has been repaired and renovated several times according to the period requirements. After the battle of Mohács t the beginning of Ottoman Turkish occupation the fortress was quickly repaired by the local captain Gregor Martonosi Pesthényi in 1527, to protect it from the approaching army of John Zápolya, supported by Turks. That year an army commander of Zápolya, Gáspár Ráskay drew into Guta and conquered the town. Soon afterwards, the fortress fell into the hands of the Habsburg imperial army again.

Between 1584 and 1594 the fortress was strengthened with the help of the Italian army engineers. At the time when Gabriel Bethlen was conquering the fortress in Komárno, local Walloon and French soldiers escaped. Between 1662 and 1664, with the inhabitants afraid of new attacks by Turks, the fortress was modernized again. Inside there were stone accommodation houses and stone stores for gunpowder and guns. At that time there were 130 mercenaries behind the walls under the command of Mathias Frühwirtha. In the spring of 1707 at the time of the Rákóczi's War for Independence, Count Guido Starhemberg performed the fortification worth 6090 forints with the help of the army engineer Fischer.

The Kuruc general János Bottyán stayed near the town on four occasions. On 12 July 1708 he conquered the fortress with the help of heavy artillery and captured local mercenaries. After the fighting the fortress was destroyed and Kuruc soldiers retreated with the words "Let it be the residence of frogs from now!" Although the fortress was repaired later, its derogatory name Békavár (Frog Castle) was preserved. A Danish garrison was located there by General Heister. In the 1840s, the fortress had no importance, only the army of the general Görgeyho had a rest there after a lost battle.

== Sports ==
The town has an active sports scene thanks to various clubs.

Each sports club, including football, handball, judo, wrestling, cycling, karate, table tennis, Gut-gym, water tourism, pigeon breeders, cynologic - budgets independently. The budget of individual sports clubs consists of financial aid from the Town of Kolárovo after being approved by the Municipal Parliament, contributions acquired from sponsors, various subsidies, tickets, membership fees etc. All sports clubs, either club of classical sports, sporting-artistic, combat or just for fun, have a common objective. Their main objective is to obtain the best possible results and also to educate young people. They try to engage as many people as possible in various sporting activities. They organise year by year recruitment with demonstrations for pupils of primary schools with the idea that in this way they acquire as many young people, active sportsmen, as possible.

The sports clubs on the territory of the Town of Kolárovo organise year by year mass sporting events like "Sporting Day of the Town of Kolárovo" and "International Sporting Day of Sister Cities of Kolárovo - Kisbér". The Committee of Sports of the Municipal Parliament is a co-ordinator of these event organization.

Apart from giving financial aid, the Municipal Parliament tries to inspire young people and older sportsmen. It supports the sports collectives of our town and is involved with the Committee of Sports.

== Cultural sights ==
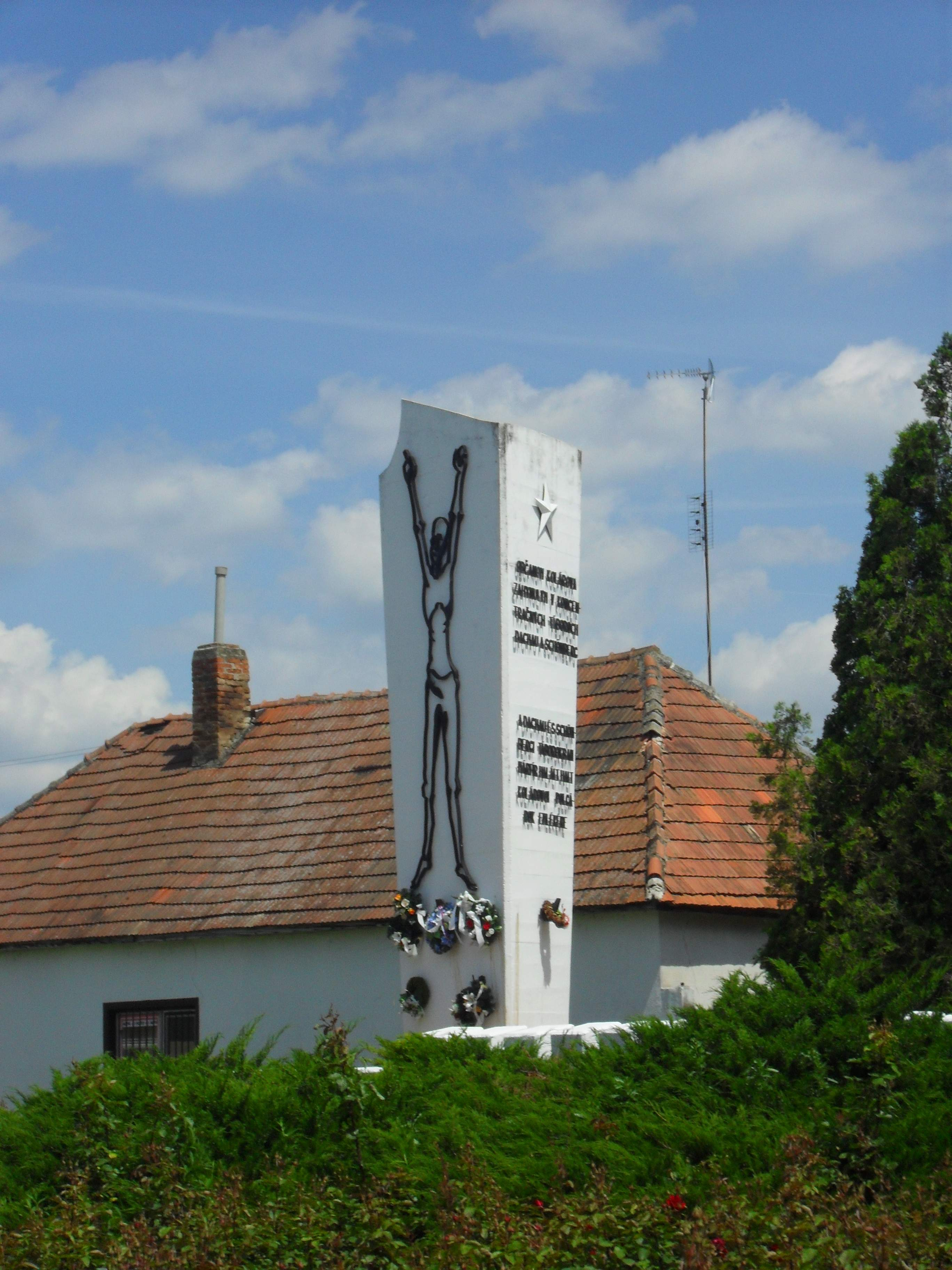
Memorial to those inhabitants of Kolárovo who perished at Dachau and Schönberg concentration camps during World War II.

The Roman Catholic Church of the Assumption of the Virgin Mary was built between the years 1723–1724 in Baroque style at the place of the older burnt-out Gothic church. In 1772, the building was enlarged. In the interior of the church there is a late baroque wagon vault. The altar painting on the main classical altar illustrates the translation of the Virgin Mary being a masterpiece of Ferdinand Lütgerndorff from 1832. There was an older fortifying wall around the church with loopholes and round corner bastions from the 17th century. However, the wall was sadly pulled down in the 1950'.

The chapel in the former cemetery is a Baroque construction from the 1750s. In front of the chapel there is a gate to the former cemetery.

The Holy Trinity Column is erected at the original spot in the church park and dates back to 1831. It was built to commemorate the victims of cholera. The statue of St Valentine is a work of folk art dating back to 1835 and was placed in front of the market entrance. Today, after having been removed several times, it is situated next to the chapel. The Memorial of World War I dates back to the 1920s. The statue "Come up to me" is the work of Alajos Riegele. On the board there are the names of dead soldiers. The memorial of the people taken to the concentration camps in Dachau and Schonberg is the work of János Reicher and constructor István Lukačovič. The memorial was in 1965 originally situated next to the Municipality Office. The statue of Mother Earth is the work of the sculptor János Nagy. The fountain in front of the Municipality Office illustrates the unity during flood, the work called Outburst in front of the Municipality Office is based on the design of the constructor Paluš.

The memorial of the victims of World War II with the names of victims is situated in a new park. The tables on deportation in 1947 are on the statue of Mother and Child in the park of the Health Center. On the wall next to the entrance gate to the former cemetery there is a diploma by the sculptor Klára Pataki. The statue of a girl with a bucket situated in the area of the Slovak Primary School is the work of the sculptor J. V. Huck. The houses made from extruded bricks with a walled gable under the thatched roof date back to 19th century. Several of these houses have been preserved today.

== Shipboard mill ==
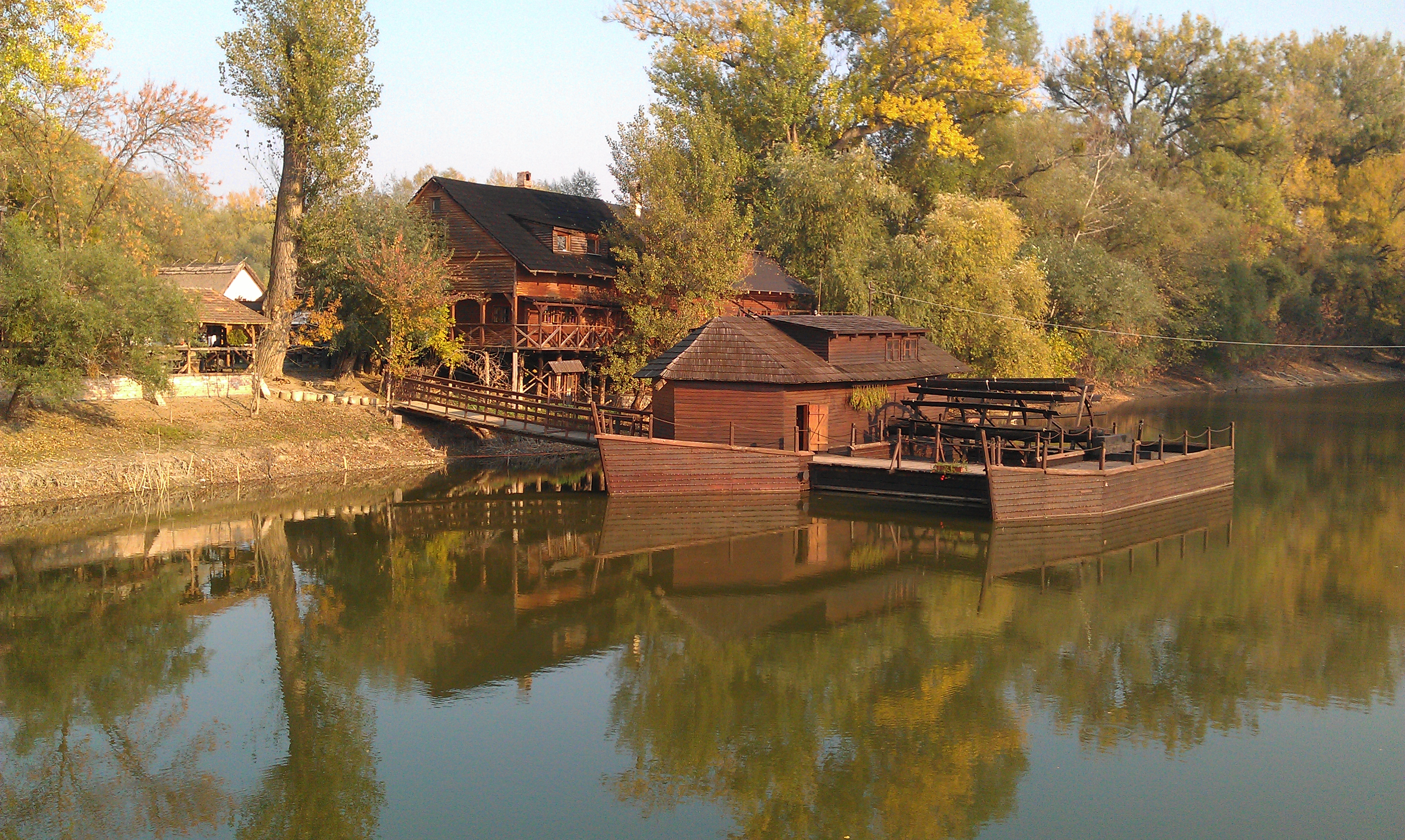
Ship mill in Kolárovo.

The last floating mill was moved to Slovak village museum's storage in Martin in 1965. Administration of relics in Komárno in 1980 initialised the main idea to build up at least one floating mill as an exhibit for educational and museum function. They work out a project, to make it suitable for new surroundings on the Little Danube rim, based on a steel floater.

=== Exhibits ===
==== Natural area ====
Shipboard Water mill, is situated in Kolarovo town, on the southwest part of "Rye Island" which is surrounded by two rivers- the Little Danube and the Vah, and by the dead sector of the Little Danube. It was built as part of a cultural monument - Shipboard mill - in an area with typical meadow forest fauna and flora. An almost unbelievable part of this area is the ruins of "Peace Castle". The next notable sight is the wooden bridge with wooden roofing. Its length (86 m) ranks it among the longest wooden bridges in Europe. Characteristic of life in this area is that peacocks breed here in the wild. The area's historic development is studied by members of the Society of Protectors. They have created a place to show country architecture, a place for children's education, summer camps, and country tourists. The Water mill Museum is open daily from 10 a.m. to 7 p.m. in the summer season i.e. from May to September. There is an excellent camping site and a lot of community activity.

Notable people
Relationship	Person	Description
Born	Károly Hadaly	Born in 1743. He studied at the university of Nagyszombat (currently Trnava), where he obtained his doctorate in philosophy and law. He was a professor of mathematics in Nagyszombat, Győr, Pécs, Pressburg and from 1810 to 1831 in Budapest. He was a lecturer in Institutum Geometricum in the capital of Hungary too. He died in 1834 in Budapest.
Lived	Kálmán Gőgh	football player
Lived	Peter Magvaši	first commissioner of works in Slovakia

== Institutions ==
=== Church ===
- Reformed Christian Mission Congregation, Slovenská St. No. 22
- Roman Catholic Church, Kostolné nám. No. 17
- Evangelical Parish Office, Mostová St. 26

=== Schools ===
- Ján Amos Komenský Primary School with Slovak language teaching, Rábska St. 14
- Corvin Mátyás Primary School with Hungarian language teaching, Školská St. 6
- II. F.Rákóczi Primary School with Hungarian language teaching, Palkovichova St. 3
- Basic School of Arts, Kostolné nám. No. 10
- Schola Privata Gutaiensis, Slovenská St. 52
- Church 8-year Grammar School of Our Lady, Brnenské nám. No. 15

=== Pensioners Club ===
- Pensioners Club, Kolárovo, Dlhá St. No.29
- Pension House for Pensioners and Pensioners Club Kolárovo, Partizánska St. No. 15-17

== Companies ==
- Beneficus
- IP Trans
- Kromberg & Schubert
- Projekt Market
- Vitaflora
- PEMO Trans
- Sting 2000 s.r.o.
- milna s.r.o.
- sungut-solar

== Twin towns — sister cities ==
Kolárovo is twinned with:

- Galgaguta, Hungary
- Kisbér, Hungary
- Medgyesegyháza, Hungary
- Mezőberény, Hungary
- Pitvaros, Hungary

== See also ==
- Kolárovo Castle
- List of municipalities and towns in Slovakia

== Genealogical resources ==
The records for genealogical research are available at the state archive "Státný archiv in Nitra, Slovakia"

- Roman Catholic church records (births/marriages/deaths): 1715-1910 (parish A)
- Reformated church records (births/marriages/deaths): 1711-1897 (parish B)
