= Koroncó =

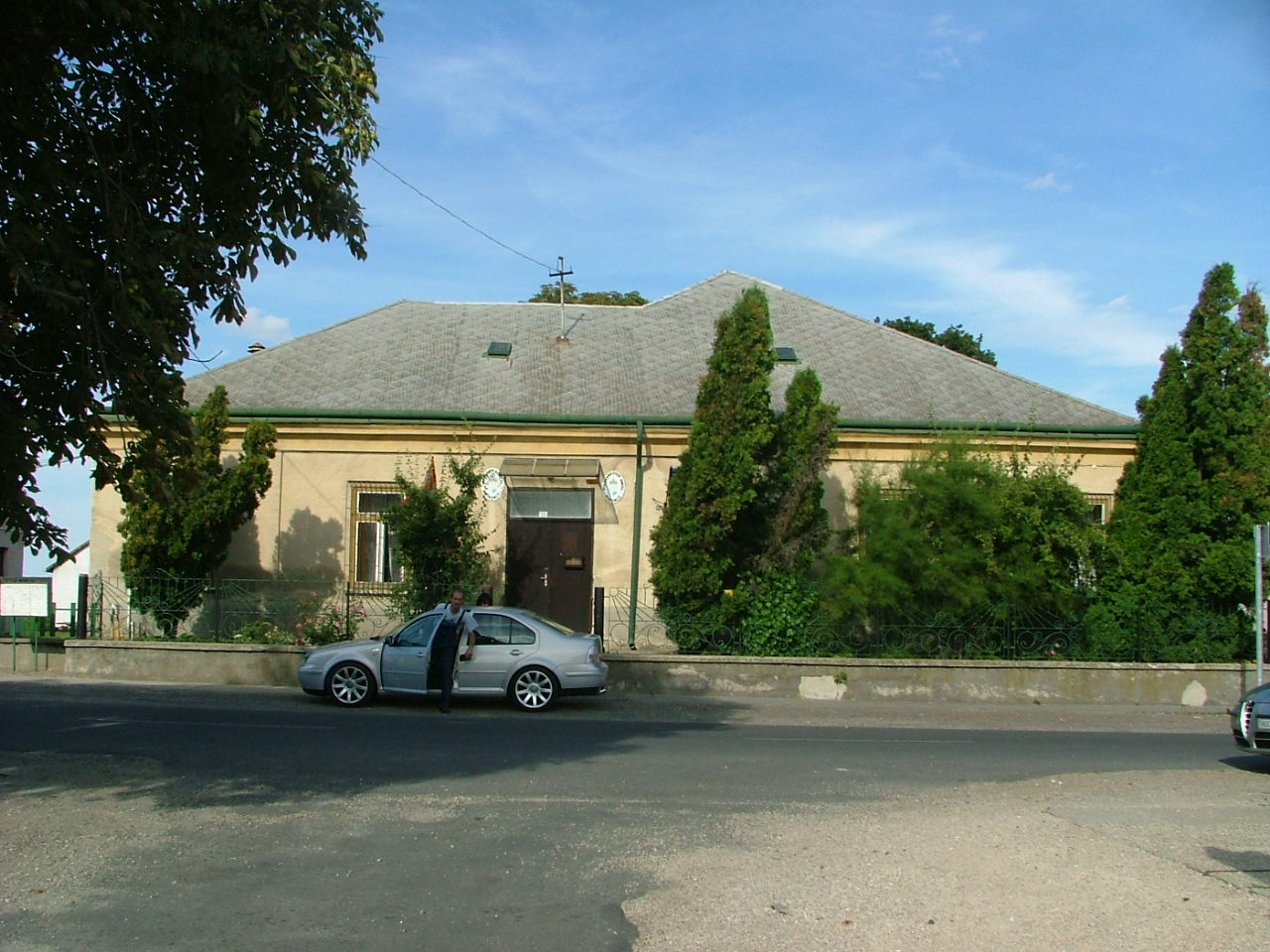
- Village hall

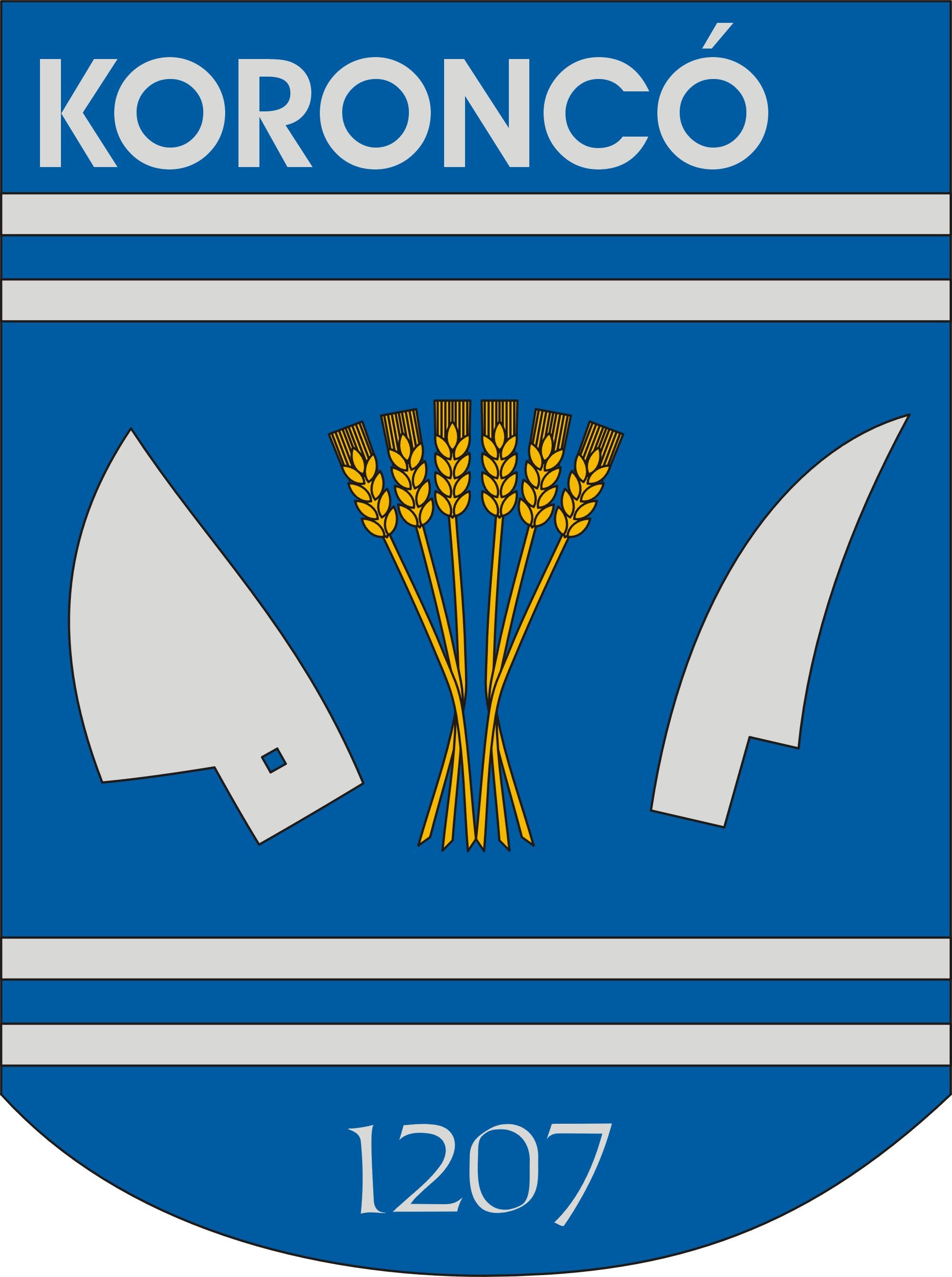
- Coat of arms

- Location of Győr-Moson-Sopron county in Hungary

- Location of Koroncó
- Coordinates: 47.60066°N 17.52927°E
- Country: Hungary
- County: Győr-Moson-Sopron

Area
  - Total: 26.91 km^{2} (10.39 sq mi)

Population (2004)
  - Total: 1,915
  - Density: 71.16/km^{2} (184.3/sq mi)
- Time zone: UTC+1 (CET)
  - Summer (DST): UTC+2 (CEST)
- Postal code: 9113
- Area code: 96

Koroncó is a village in Győr-Moson-Sopron county, Hungary.

== History ==
The battle of Koroncó, between the Kurucs and the army of Habsburg Empire, took place here on 13 June 1704.

The local football team is called Koroncó KSSZE.
