= Podunajské Biskupice =

- Borough
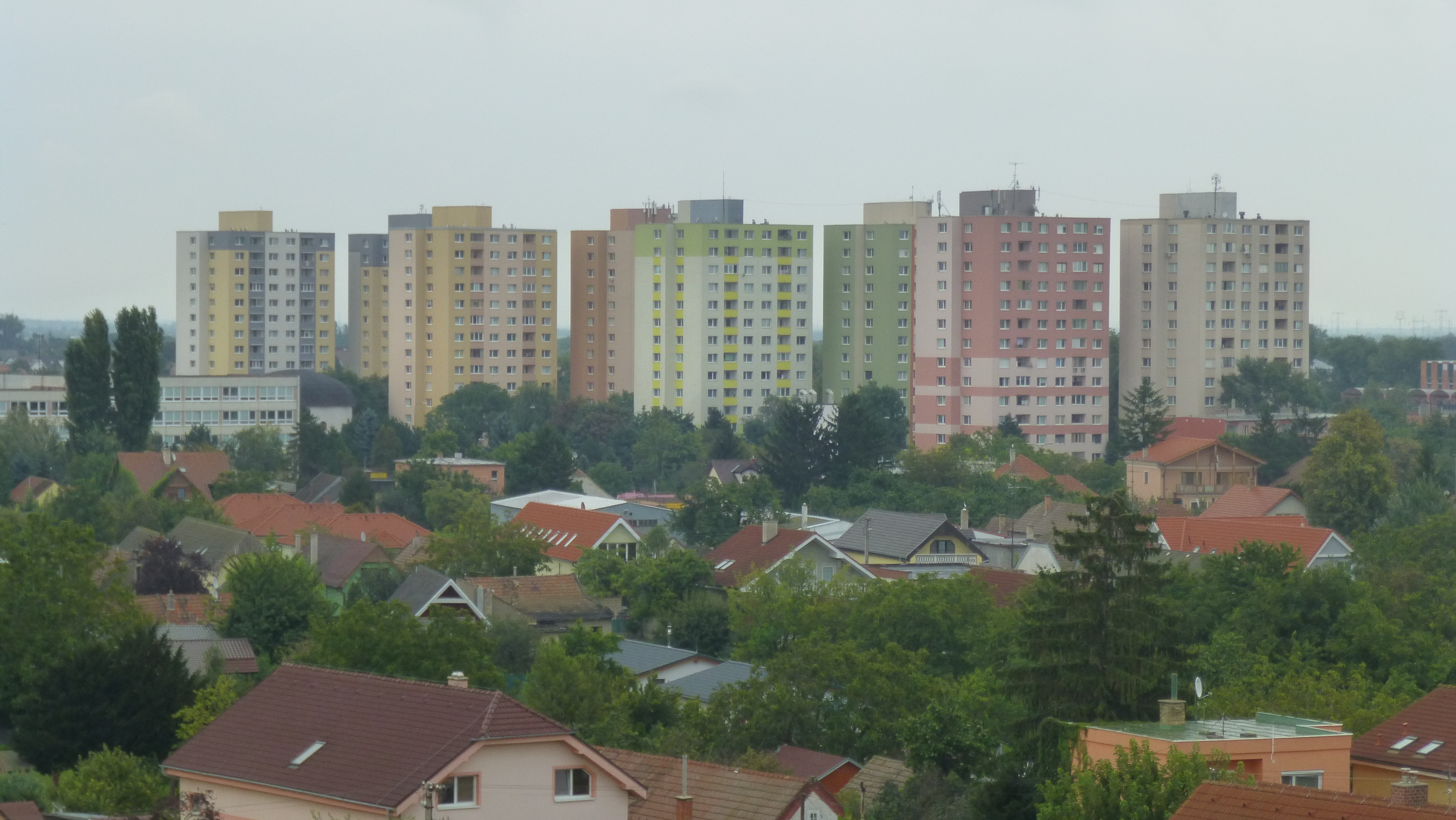

- Coat of arms

- Area of Podunajské Biskupice in Bratislava

- Location of Podunajské Biskupice in Slovakia
- Coordinates: 48°08′00″N 17°07′00″E
- Country: Slovakia
- Region: Bratislava Region
- District: Bratislava II
- First mentioned: 1264 (Julian)

Government
  - Mayor: Roman Lamoš

Area
  - Total: 42.49 km^{2} (16.41 sq mi)
- Elevation: 133 m (436 ft)

Population (2025)
  - Total: 22,998
- Time zone: UTC+1 (CET)
  - Summer (DST): UTC+2 (CEST)
- Postal code: 821 06, 821 07
- Area code: +421-2
- Vehicle registration plate (until 2022): BA, BL, BT
- Website: www.biskupice.sk

Podunajské Biskupice (Hungarian: Pozsonypüspöki) (1927–1944 Biskupice pri Dunaji, before 1927 Biskupice) is a borough of Bratislava. It is the largest borough in the terms of area in Bratislava.

== History ==
The first written account of Podunajské Biskupice dates to the 13th century; its church is mentioned in 1221.

Biskupice were part of the property of the Estergom archbishopric. Based on this name, some authors infer the existence of an Avar bishopric in the area of today's Biskupice, as there were different words for archbishopric and bishopric in Latin and in Old Hungarian. The territory of the Christian Avar bishopric and includes the area from Lake Nezider to the vicinity of Biskupice and the river Ráb.

On April 21, 1704, was a battle between the Hungarian rebels (Kuruc) and Danes (Battle of Biskupice). It became an official part of Bratislava on 1 January 1972.

== Historical landmarks ==
The Romans also allegedly lived in Podunajské Biskupice, a Roman militia of Emperor Alexander Sever from 230 and a Latin inscription on a rock, which originally stood near the parish church with the stamp of the Roman camp, were found here. Through the Danube, Biskupice led the so-called amber road that led from Rome to the Baltic coast.

In Podunajské Biskupice there is the Roman Catholic Church of St. Nicholas from 1221. In the town, there is also the manor of Juraj Albert from the 18th century and the plague column of the Virgin Mary and the Holy Trinity from 1730.

There is a monastery of the Sisters of Mercy of the Holy Cross. In the monastery church of St. Crosses are kept relics bl. Zdenka Schelingová, who was buried in the local cemetery until 2003.

Lieskovec Manor or Lieskovec Summer Castle is located in Bratislava in the Podunajské Biskupice district in the Lieskovec district. The mansion was built by Cardinal Jozef Batthyányi between 1779 and 1783. It originally stood in the middle of the archbishop's garden. The decoration of the mansion is destroyed, it is used as a warehouse.

The Trade Museum in Bratislava is located in the premises of a country manor surrounded by a park. The museum was established in 1983.

== Church of Saint Nicholas ==
The Church of St. Nicholas is a Roman Catholic parish church located in Bratislava in the Podunajské Biskupice district on Vetvárská Street in the parish of Bratislava - Podunajské Biskupice. It is a 3-nave Romanesque-Gothic church from the middle of the 13th century, with a polygonal sanctuary and one tower on the west side. Since it has been rebuilt more than once since its inception, it bears the hallmarks of various styles - Gothic, Romanesque, Baroque, and Classicist.

== Inclusion into Bratislava ==
In 1944, the village of Komárov was added to the Podunajské Biskupice.[5] On January 1, 1972, the Podunajské Biskupice became part of Bratislava.

== Geography ==
The municipality lies at an altitude of 133 metres (436 ft) and covers an area of 42.49 km^{2} (16.41 sq mi) (2025).

== Population ==
Population statistic (10 years)
Year	1995	2005	2015	2025
Count	20,643	19,977	21,644	22,998
Difference		−3.22%	+8.34%	+6.25%

Population statistic
Year	2024	2025
Count	23,091	22,998
Difference		−0.40%

It has a population of 22,998 people (31 December 2025).

=== Ethnicity ===
Census 2021 (1+ %)
Ethnicity	Number	Fraction
Slovak	19,057	81.21%
Not found out	2331	9.93%
Hungarian	2146	9.14%
Czech	290	1.23%
Total	23,464	

In year 2021 was 23,464 people by ethnicity 19,057 as Slovak, 2331 as Not found out, 2146 as Hungarian, 290 as Czech, 100 as Other, 88 as Romani, 76 as Rusyn, 70 as Ukrainian, 62 as German, 46 as Russian, 31 as Serbian, 30 as Bulgarian, 26 as Polish, 24 as Romanian, 23 as Chinese, 18 as Vietnamese, 18 as Croatian, 16 as Austrian, 13 as Jewish, 12 as Moravian, 11 as Italian, 8 as French, 6 as Albanian, 5 as Turkish, 5 as Canadian, 5 as English and 3 as Greek.

Note on population: The difference values of population numbers in the table "Population statistic" and in the sections "Ethnicity" & "Religion" is caused by the use of various statistical methods.

=== Religion ===
Census 2021 (1+ %)
Religion	Number	Fraction
Roman Catholic Church	9963	42.46%
None	9194	39.18%
Not found out	2320	9.89%
Evangelical Church	746	3.18%
Greek Catholic Church	262	1.12%
Total	23,464	

In year 2021 was 23,464 people by religion 9963 from Roman Catholic Church, 9194 from None, 2320 from Not found out, 746 from Evangelical Church, 262 from Greek Catholic Church, 132 from Eastern Orthodox Church, 123 from Ad hoc movements, 103 from Calvinist Church, 92 from Christian Congregations in Slovakia, 91 from Jehovah's Witnesses, 91 from Other, 74 from Baptists Church, 56 from Buddhism, 54 from Other and not ascertained christian church, 35 from Islam, 30 from Apostolic Church, 20 from Old Catholic Church, 20 from Church of the Brethren, 15 from Jewish community, 14 from United Methodist Church, 12 from Paganism and natural spirituality, 7 from Hinduism, 5 from Church of Jesus Christ of Latter-day Saints, 3 from Seventh-day Adventist Church and 2 from Czechoslovak Hussite Church.

== See also ==
- Kopáčsky ostrov
