= Szátok =

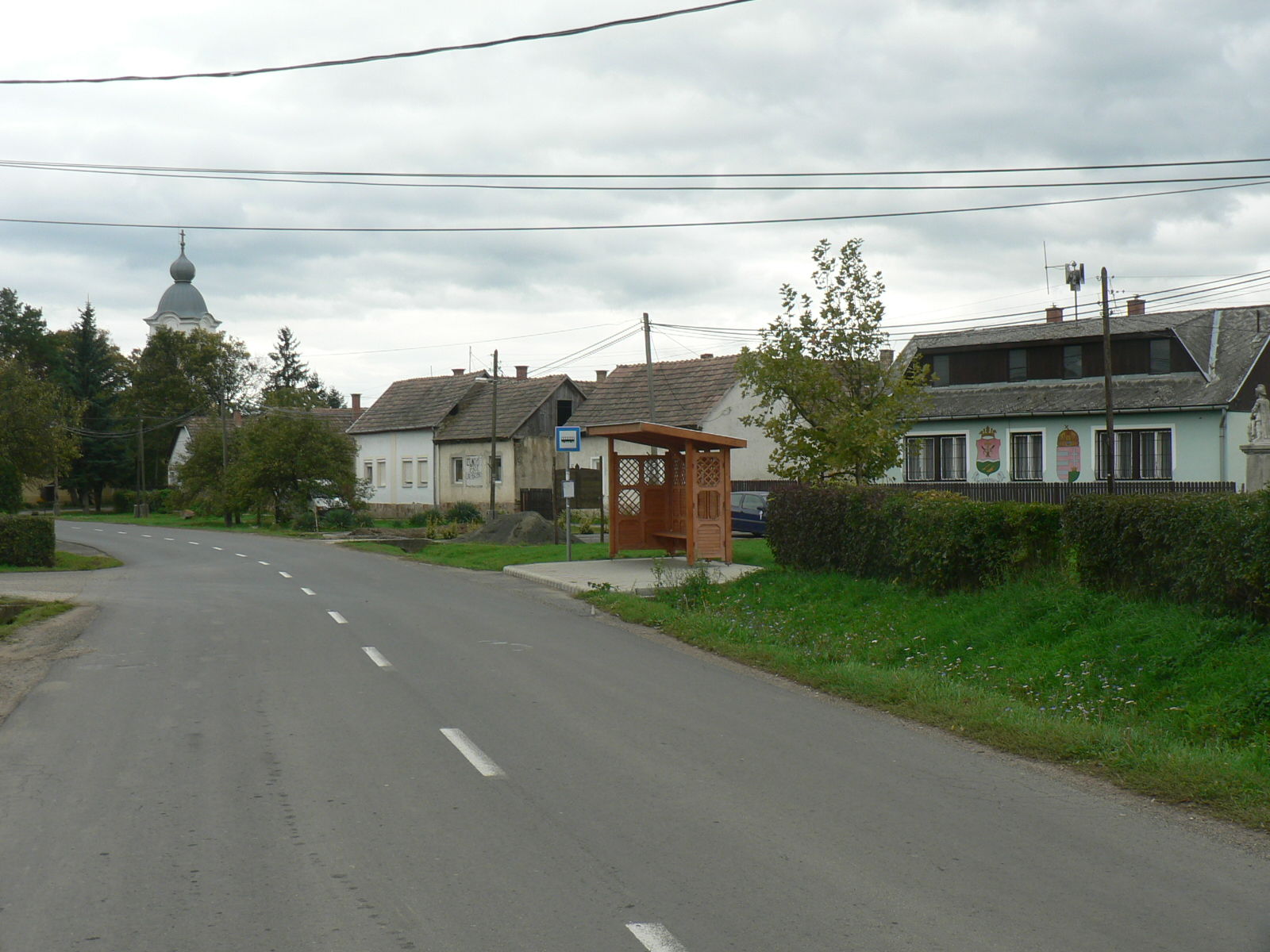
- A view of Szátok.

- Coat of arms

- Szátok within the map of Hungary
- Coordinates: 47.95464°N 19.234471°E
- Country: Hungary
- Region: Northern Hungary
- County: Nógrád
- District: Rétság

Government
  - Mayor: Pacsa Szilvia (Ind.)

Area
  - Total: 8.95 km^{2} (3.46 sq mi)

Population (2022)
  - Total: 551
  - Density: 61.6/km^{2} (159/sq mi)
- Time zone: UTC+1 (CET)
  - Summer (DST): UTC+2 (CEST)
- Postal code: 2656
- Area code: 35
- Website: szatok.hu

Szátok is a village and municipality in Nógrád County, Hungary.

It is located in the western part of Cserhát, between the villages of Tereske and Romhány.
