= Kuruc.info =

Hungarian far-right website

- Website type: Holocaust denial Antisemitism; Antiziganism; Anti-LGBT; Far-right politics
- Available in: Hungarian
- Creators: Előd Novák; József Hering; Tamás Esze; János Lantos
- Website: kuruc.info
- Launched: February 1, 2006; 20 years ago
- Current status: Online

Kuruc.info is a far-right, neo-Nazi Hungarian online portal registered in California, United States, affiliated with politician Előd Novák. The website often harbours extreme antisemitic sentiments, including frequent Holocaust denial, and frequently publishes anti-Romani and homophobic content.

== History ==
The first iteration of the website, kettosallampolgarsag.hu, was created to support the 2004 Hungarian dual citizenship referendum. The website then illegally published personal information about publicist Imre Para-Kovács. As the website's focus broadened, and its traffic kept growing even after the referendum had ended, its editors decided to start Kuruc.info on 1 February 2006, named after the "Kuruc", the rebels against the Habsburg monarchy who fought for Hungarian independence between 1671 and 1711. Until 2019, Kuruc.info's staff was anonymous, and the website was registered in the name of a private individual, first in Scottsdale, Arizona, then Healdsburg, California. The website first gained notoriety for its "more SZDSZ, more paedophiles" campaign before the 2006 Hungarian parliamentary election, which was also closely affiliated with the newly formed Jobbik party. In 2006, Kuruc.info also posted photographs, addresses, and phone numbers of judges and prosecutors who had participated in legal proceedings against anti-government protestors. Several of the officials whose details were posted received threatening phone calls and letters. After this, the website still routinely published the personal data of individuals they opposed.

In 2008, the web servers of Kuruc.info were shut down after requests from the Hungarian government. However, the website quickly came back online. In 2012, the Hungarian government requested the American government to shut the website down again without success. Around the same time, it was revealed that the website was registered under the name of Bela Varga, a winemaker from Healdsburg, California who denied his involvement with the website, claiming that he registered it for a friend.

Although Kuruc.info was heavily associated with the Jobbik political party in its early days, it became increasingly critical of the party around 2016, mainly due to Jobbik's drift toward a more centre-right ideology, which was strongly opposed by the website's owner and previous Jobbik vice president Előd Novák This split, as well as the emergence of other right-wing websites such as 888.hu and Pesti Srácok saw the website's popularity decline, dropping from the 34th most popular Hungarian website to 96th in the span of 4 years. After years of denying his involvement with Kuruc.info, Előd Novák revealed his ownership of the website in 2019, as well as the involvement of ex-journalist József Hering, ex-MIÉP politician Tamás Esze, and publicist János Lantos.

== Political ideology ==
Kuruc.info considers itself to be more right-wing than the far-right Hungarian political party known as the Jobbik, distinguishing itself from Barikád, which is regarded as Jobbik's "semi-official online news organ". Kuruc.info nevertheless maintains a relationship with Jobbik through advertisements and payment to personnel.

since the formation of the more radical Our Homeland Movement party in 2018, the gradually more moderate Jobbik party has fallen out of favour and even become one of the main enemies in the news of the Kuruc portal. According to the articles of Kuruc.info, the Jobbik party has become synonymous with ideological betrayal.

Categories on the site include "anti-Hungarianism", "Gypsy-crime", "Jewish crime", "migrant crime", "economic news", where there is more discussion of the economic crimes of Jews and communists, and a "humor" section where one can find derogatory jokes about Jews, Romani, and communists. Users engage in commentary about the website's publications and maintain an active site forum.
