= Károly Hadaly =

Hungarian mathematician

Károly Hadaly (1743, in Gúta, currently Kolárovo – 1834, in Pest) was a Hungarian mathematician. He studied at the University of Trnava, where he earned doctorates in philosophy and law. He was a professor of mathematics in Nagyszombat (currently Trnava), in Győr, in Pécs, in Pozsony (currently Bratislava) and in Budapest. From 1810 to 1831 he taught mathematics and physics in the Institutum geometricum.

== Works of Károly Hadaly ==
- Elementa hydrotechnica - Bratislava, 1783
- Ars delineandi, coloribusque localibus adumbrandi cadem - Győr, 1784
- Anfangsgründe der Mathematik - Bratislava, 1791
- Mechanica solidorum Budapest, 1808
