= Kopáčsky ostrov =

Coordinates: 48.097993°N 17.161240°E

- IUCN category Ia (strict nature reserve)
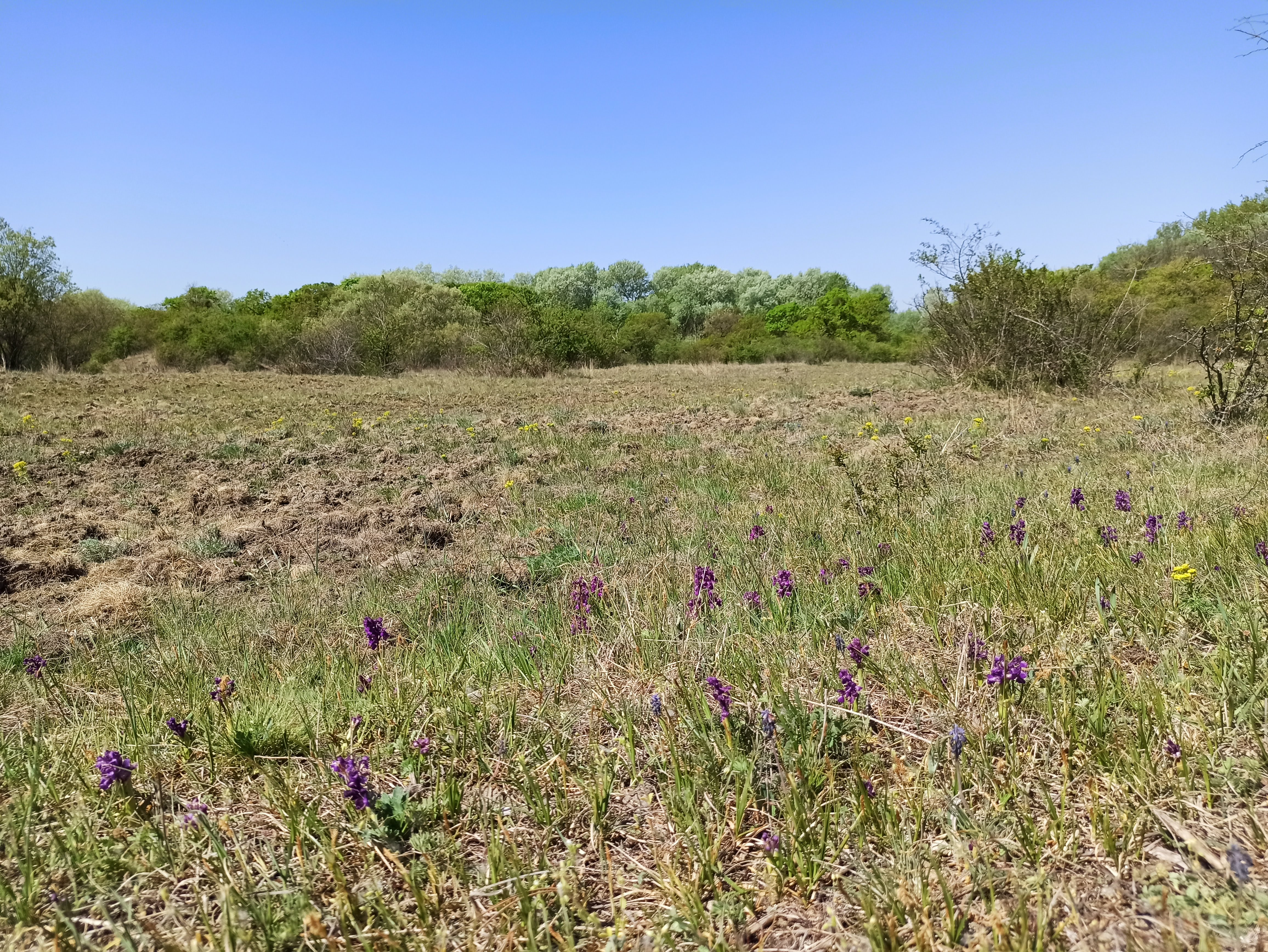
- Kopáčsky ostrov
- Interactive map of Kopáčsky ostrov
- Area: 0.82 km²
- Established: 1976
- Governing body: ŠOP - S-CHKO Dunajské luhy

Kopáčsky ostrov is a nature reserve in the Podunajské Biskupice district of Bratislava, Slovakia. The nature reserve covers an area of 82.62 ha on the left shore of the Danube. It has a protection level of 5 (the highest) under the Slovak nature protection system. The nature reserve is part of the Dunajské luhy Protected Landscape Area.

== Description ==
The area was declared as a protected area with the goal to protect a mosaic of steppe, forest-steppe and floodplain forest communities. It is used for scientific research and educational purposes.

== Flora ==
On the drier parts of the nature reserve grow various species of orchids, including Orchis militaris, Anacamptis coriophora and Anacamptis morio.
