= Johann Paul Freiherr von Hocher =

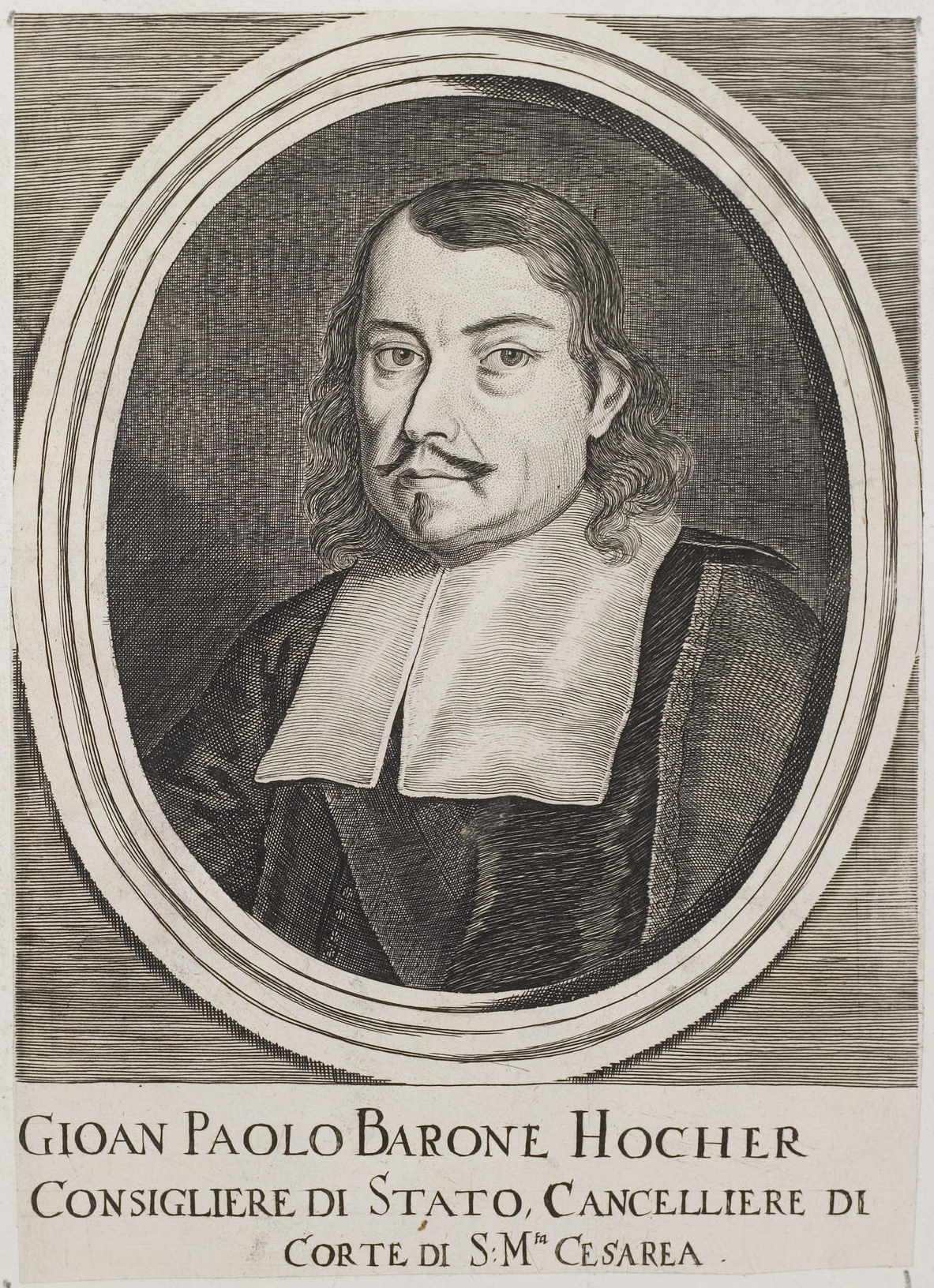
Johann Paul von Hocher

Johann Paul Freiherr von Hocher (12 August 1616 – 28 February 1683) was an Austrian jurist and Supreme Court chancellor (hofkanzler) to the Emperor Leopold I.

== Early life ==
Johann Paul Hocher was the son of Johann Hocher Arbogast Hocher (or Hocherr) from Masmünster in Oberelsass (Upper Alsace), a professor at the University of Freiburg, and Magdalena von Mager of Fuchsstadt. At the university in Freiburg he studied law.

Because of concerns about the war with Sweden, his parents sent Hocher to Innsbruck in 1635. There, the local Hofkammer-president Johann Michael von Schmauß took care of him and brought him to the famous lawyer Johann Baptist Drächsel at Bozen (Bolzano), where Hocher acquired a reputation as a lawyer, although he soon fell out with Drächsel. In 1642 he was awarded his doctorate in law from Freiburg.

== Career ==
In 1637 Archduke Ferdinand Karl appointed him to be a councillor (Regimentsrat) of Upper Austria. In 1646 he was appointed to the Wirklichen Regimentsrat and in 1654 to the Regimentskammer. In 1655 Hocher became the Tyrolean Vice-Chancellor (Vizekanzler) and on 9 July 1660 was knighted in Innsbruck. In the same year Hocher wrote a new Tyrolean constitution, the Tirolische Landesordnung. In December 1660 he gave up his position as Vice-Chancellor to become the Court Chancellor (Hofkanzler) (1660-1663) to the Prince Bishop of Brixen.

At the Imperial Diet of Regensburg in 1665 Hocher acted as the Imperial Reichshofrat and Austrian ambassador. On the death of Archduke Sigismund Francis and the subsequent union of Tyrol with the other Habsburg dominions under Leopold I, the emperor appointed him Vice Chancellor of Upper Austria on 1 October 1665. In view of his origins as a commoner, Hocher declined the position of court chancellor (Obersten Hofkanzler) but accepted this honour upon his elevation to the hereditary peerage (8 March 1667).

Following the Magnate conspiracy Hocher headed the Special Court which sentenced to death the leaders of the conspiracy (Ferenc Nadasdy, Petar Zrinski and Fran Krsto Frankopan) in 1671. Shortly before the second Turkish siege of Vienna in July 1683 Hocher died at "Gundelhof" in Vienna (now Number 4, Bauernmarkt in the First District of Vienna). He was buried in the family vault in Kuefstein'schen, Greillenstein (Horn District, Lower Austria).

== Legacy ==
The foundation charter of the University of Innsbruck (26 April 1677) bears his countersignature.

== Sources ==
- Hans Wagner: Hocher, Johann Paul Freiherr von In Neue Deutsche Biographie NDB). Band 9, Duncker & Humblot, Berlin 1972, S. 287 f. (Digitalised).
- Heinrich Ritter von Zeißberg :Hocher, Johann Paul In: Allgemeine Deutsche Biographie (ADB). Band 12, Duncker & Humblot, Leipzig 1880, S. 520 f.
