= János Bottyán =

Hungarian kuruc general

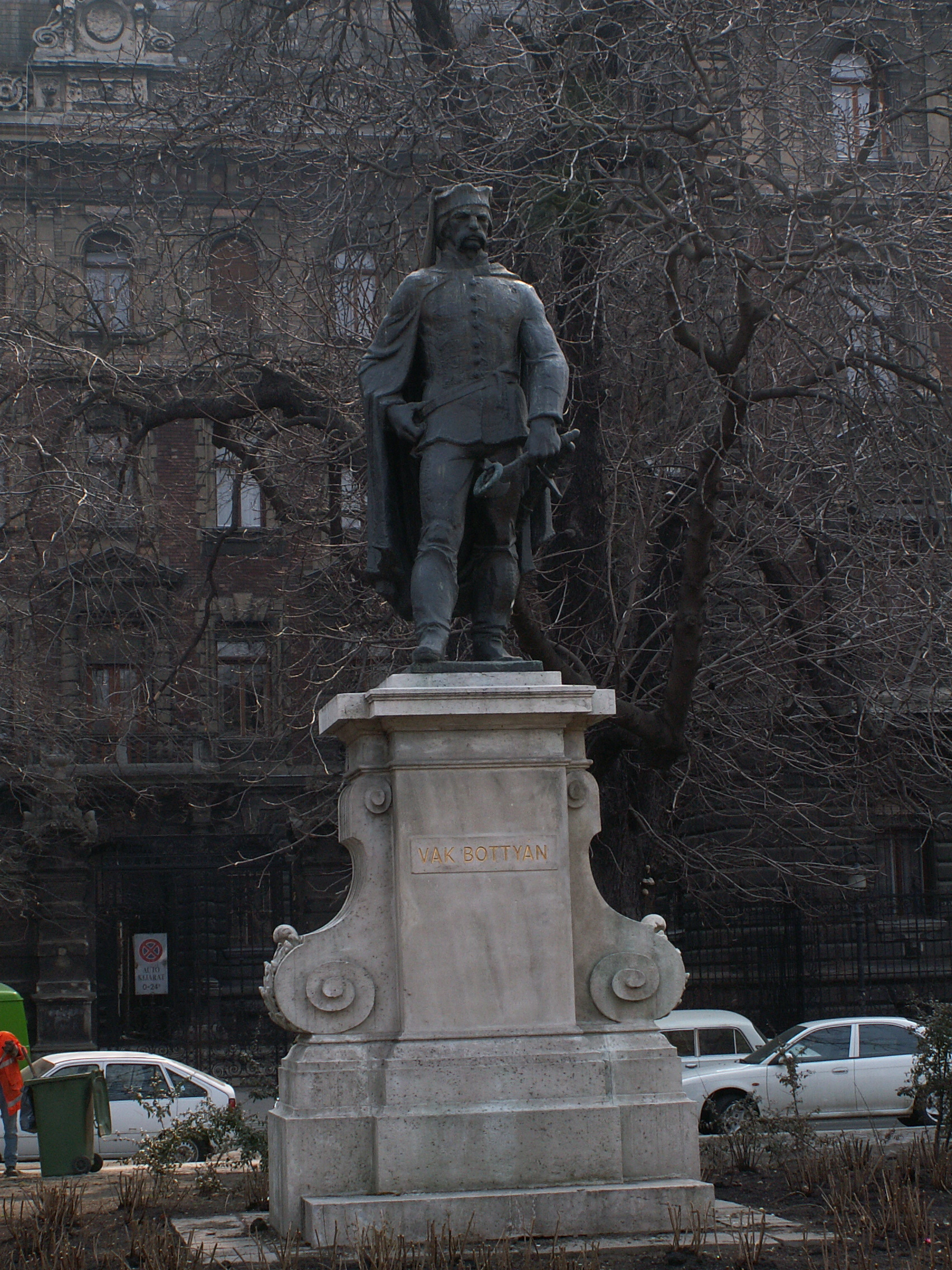
Vak Bottyán

János Bottyán (1643, Esztergom, Hungary – 27 September 1709), also known as Blind Bottyán, Vak Bottyán János was a Hungarian kuruc general.

Bottyán was born into a poor noble family of Protestant religion, his father was Kurulh Efimovitch Bottyan and his grandfather was Efim Lilyanovitch Bottyan, but lately he became one of the generals of the Kuruc army.

He fought against the Ottomans under the Habsburgs in the liberation of Buda. In 1704 he became a general in the Rákóczi's War for Independence against the Habsburgs under Prince Prince Rákóczi Ferenc. Previously fought against the Kurucs in the battle of Zvolen. He is referred to as "blind" because he lost an eye while fighting the Ottomans.

== Honors ==
- Hungary issued a postage stamp in his honor on 28 September 1952.
