= Romhány =

- Village (község)
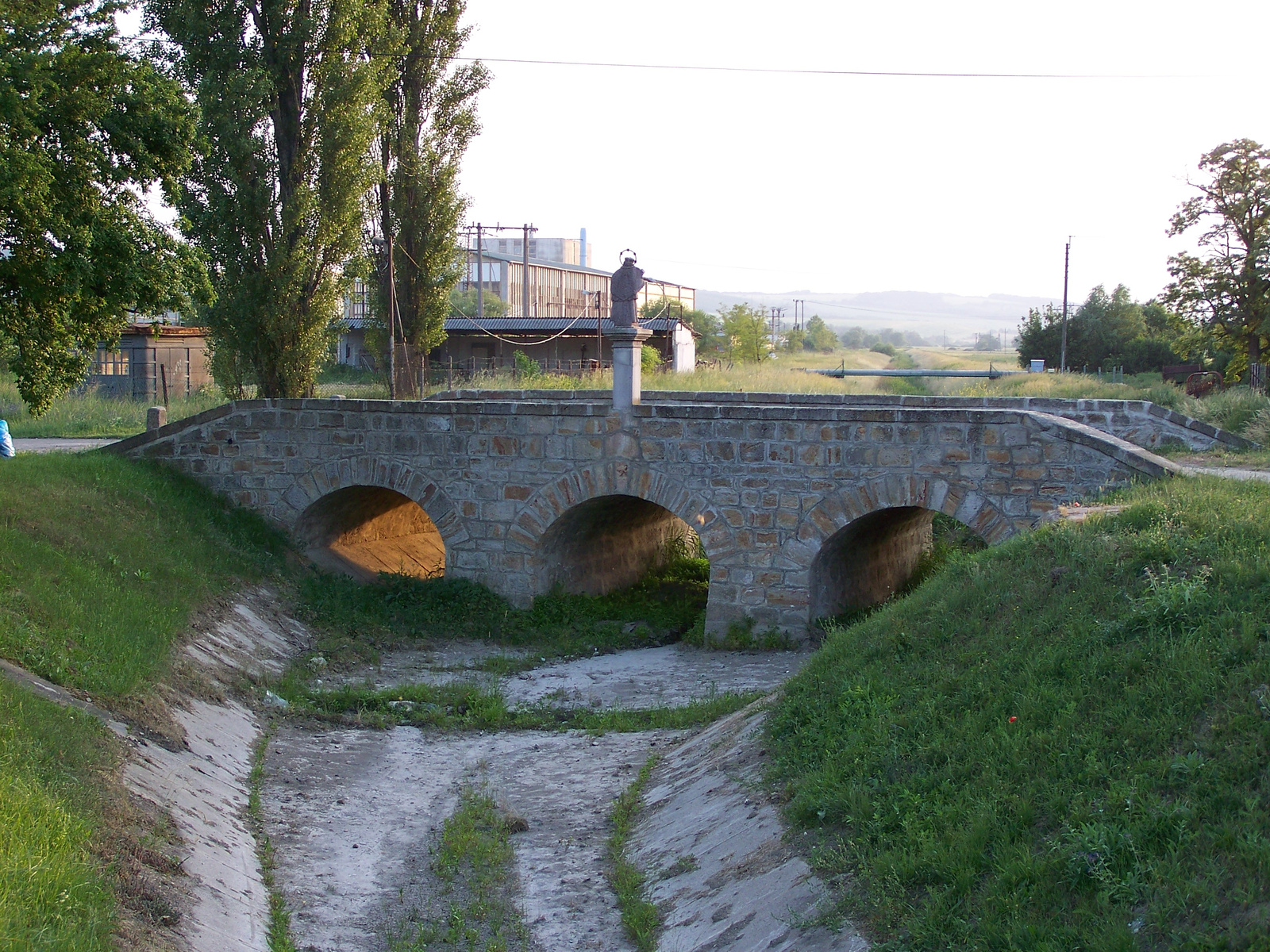

- Location of Nograd County in Hungary

- Location of Romhány in Hungary Location of Romhány in Nógrád County
- Coordinates: 47°55′32″N 19°15′30″E
- Country: Hungary
- Region: Northern Hungary
- County: Nógrád County
- Subregion: Rétság

Government
  - Mayor: Vezér Attila (Fidesz-KDNP)

Area
  - Total: 25.47 km^{2} (9.83 sq mi)

Population (1 Jan. 2015)
  - Total: 2,040
  - Density: 80/km^{2} (210/sq mi)
- Time zone: UTC+1 (CET)
  - Summer (DST): UTC+2 (CEST)
- Postal code: 2654
- Area code: 35
- Website: http://romhany.hu/

Romhány is a village in Nógrád County, Northern Hungary Region, Hungary. It is located in the western part of the county, between the hills of Cserhát. The nearest town is Rétság, which is 10 kilometers away, while the county seat (Salgótarján)is 70 kilometers away.
