= Rákóczi's War of Independence =

Insurrection in Hungary against Habsburg rule

- Part of the War of the Spanish Succession
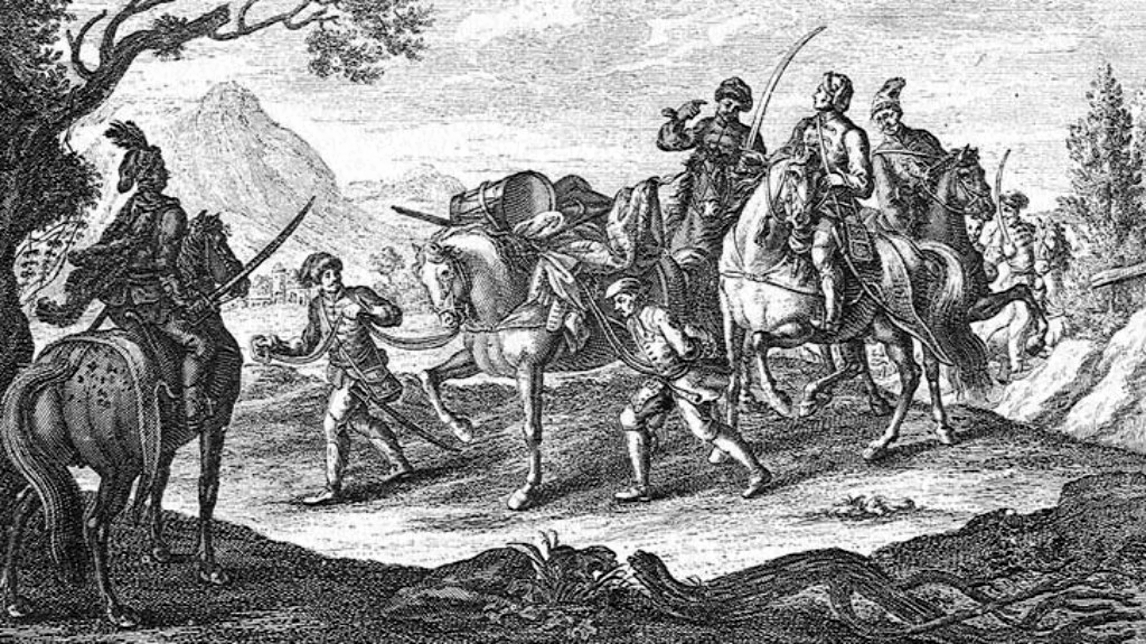
- Kuruc horsemen captured an Austrian soldier
Date	15 June 1703 – 1 May 1711
Location	Hungary
Result	Victory of Holy Roman Empire: Treaty of Szatmár; Hungarian military defeat, but the imperial government repealed its earlier harmful decrees and granted further concessions.; The war prevented Hungary's full integration into the Habsburg Empire, and Hungary's feudal constitution was preserved. The treaty granted political and religious amnesty to the kurucs.

Belligerents
Holy Roman Empire: Austria; Prussia; Margraviate of Baden; Serbs from the Military Frontier; Transylvanian Saxons; Romanian Uniates; Kingdom of Croatia; Royalists; (Denmark–Norway) Danish Auxiliary Corps; Foreign mercenaries: Swiss; Germans; Italians; Spaniards	Kuruc (Kingdom of Hungary); Principality of Transylvania; Kingdom of France; Minorities: Hungarian Slovenes; Slovaks; Rusyns; Zipser Saxons; Hungarian Germans; Croats from Hungary; Šokac and Bunjevac people; Romanians in Hungary (factions); pro-Hungarian Serbs; Foreign mercenaries and volunteers: Poles; Wallachians; Crimean Tatars; Swedes; Ottoman Turks; Germans; Lithuanians; Moldavians; Bulgarians; Lipka Tatars; Ruthenians

Commanders and leaders
Leopold I; Joseph I; Charles VI; Prince Eugene of Savoy; Leopold Schlick; Sigbert Heister; Jean-Louis de Bussy-Rabutin; Jacob Cusani; Ludwig Herbeville; Guido von Starhemberg; Jovan Popović Tekelija; János Pálffy; (Denmark–Norway) Andreas Harboe	Francis II Rákóczi; István Sennyey; Miklós Bercsényi; Sándor Károlyi; Simon Forgách; János Bottyán †; Tamás Esze †; Pál Gődény; (Kingdom of France) Pierre Puchot des Alleurs; (Kingdom of France) Antoine de La Motte; (Kingdom of France) Jean-Bérenger Le Maire; (Kingdom of France) Fierville d'Hérissy de Rivière; Józef Potocki

Strength
c. 60,000; c. 4,500 Danish soldiers	c. 70,000; c. 1,500 French soldiers; c. 3,000–4,000 Swedish and Polish mercenaries (with Poles, Lithuanians, Ruthenians and Lipkas)

Rákóczi's War of Independence (1703–1711) was one of the most significant attempts to topple the rule of the Habsburgs over Hungary. The war was conducted by a group of noblemen and wealthy and high-ranking progressives and was led by Francis II Rákóczi; resigned soldiers and peasants also fought alongside the noblemen. The insurrection was unsuccessful, ending with the Treaty of Szatmár, by which the Hungarian nobility managed to satisfy some important Hungarian interests. Despite the defeat, the treaty granted political and religious amnesty to the kurucs. The war of independence achieved some major political success: it prevented Hungary's full integration into the Habsburg Empire, Hungary's constitution was preserved and the power of the parliament - as the supreme legislative institution of Hungary - remained intact.

== Prelude ==
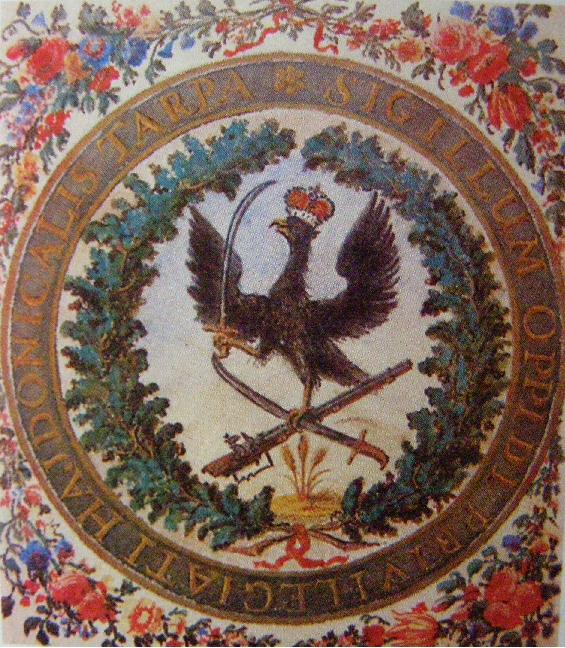
The flag of a fighting unit in the War for Independence

At the Treaty of Karlowitz in 1699, the Ottoman Empire renounced almost all of its claims to some of its Hungarian territories, which had been conquered from the medieval Kingdom of Hungary after 1526. The nobility was against Habsburg rule because the lands that had been taken away from them by the Ottomans were returned only to those who could both prove their right to own the properties and pay 10% of their worth to the Habsburgs. If they failed to do so, the property went to the empire's creditors. The peasants turned against the empire because of the hardships that the long wars had brought upon them. In 1697, an anti-Habsburg uprising in Tokaj was suppressed. However, relations between the court and the nobility were deteriorating, and the new Habsburg rulers treated the peasants so poorly that eventually, some people wished for a return to Ottoman rule.

=== Uprising ===
International relations provided the Hungarians with an opportunity to liberate themselves from the Habsburgs. With the help of King Louis XIV of France, anti-Habsburg rebels, led by the young nobleman Imre Thököly, rose against the empire in 1678. Thököly occupied most of northern Hungary. In 1681, the Ottomans joined to help him, and he was recognised as King of Upper Hungary by Sultan Mehmed IV. However, after the Ottomans lost the Battle of Vienna in 1683, Thököly lost Ottoman support and was eventually defeated in 1685. His alliance with the Ottomans changed the positive perception that Western Europe had about Hungary, and instead of being thought of as the bastion of Christianity, the country was now being thought of as an enemy. Partly as a consequence, Hungary was occupied and organised as "newly-acquired territory" instead of "territory liberated from the Ottomans".

== Leadership ==
Francis II Rákóczi (Hungarian: II. Rákóczi Ferenc) was the son of an old noble family and one of the richest landlords in the Kingdom of Hungary. He was the count (comes perpetuus) of the Comitatus Sarossiensis (in Hungarian Sáros) from 1694 onward. He was born to Francis I Rákóczi, who was elected ruling prince of Transylvania, and Ilona Zrínyi, in 1676. His father died when Rákóczi was a mere baby, and his mother married Imre Thököly in 1682. After Thököly's defeat, Zrínyi held the castle of Munkács (today Mukacheve, Ukraine) for three years but was eventually forced to surrender. After the Treaty of Karlowitz, his stepfather and mother were sent into exile, and Rákóczi had stay in Vienna under Habsburg supervision.

Remnants of Thököly's peasant army started a new uprising in the Hegyalja region of northeastern present-day Hungary, which was part of the property of the Rákóczi family. They captured the castles of Tokaj, Sárospatak and Sátoraljaújhely and asked Rákóczi to become their leader, but he was not eager to head what appeared to be a minor peasant rebellion. He quickly returned to Vienna, where he tried his best to clear his name. Rákóczi then befriended Count Miklós Bercsényi, who was married to Krisztina Csáky and had property at Ungvár (today Ужгород (Uzhhorod), in Ukraine), lay next to Rákóczi's own. Bercsényi was a highly-educated man and the third-richest man in the kingdom (after Rákóczi and Simon Forgách) and was related to most of the Hungarian aristocracy.

== Fight for independence ==
As the House of Habsburg was on the verge of dying out, France was looking for allies in its fight against Austrian hegemony. Consequently, France established contact with Rákóczi and promised support if he took up the cause of Hungarian independence. An Austrian spy seized that correspondence and brought it to the attention of the emperor. As a direct result of this, Rákóczi was arrested on 18 April 1700 and imprisoned in the fortress of Wiener Neustadt, south of Vienna. It became obvious during the preliminary hearings that just as in the case of his grandfather Péter Zrínyi, the only possible sentence for Rákóczi was death. With the aid of his pregnant wife, Amelia, and the prison commander, Rákóczi managed to escape and flee to Poland. Here he met with Bercsényi again, and together they resumed contact with the French court.

Three years later, the War of the Spanish Succession caused a large part of the Austrian forces in the Kingdom of Hungary to leave the country temporarily. Taking advantage of the situation, kuruc forces began a new uprising in Munkács, and Rákóczi was asked to head it. He decided to invest his energies in a war of national liberation and accepted the request. On 15 June 1703, another group of about 3,000 armed men, led by Tamás Esze, joined him near the Polish city of Lawoczne (today Lavochne, a village in Ukraine). Bercsényi also arrived, with French funds and 600 Polish mercenaries.

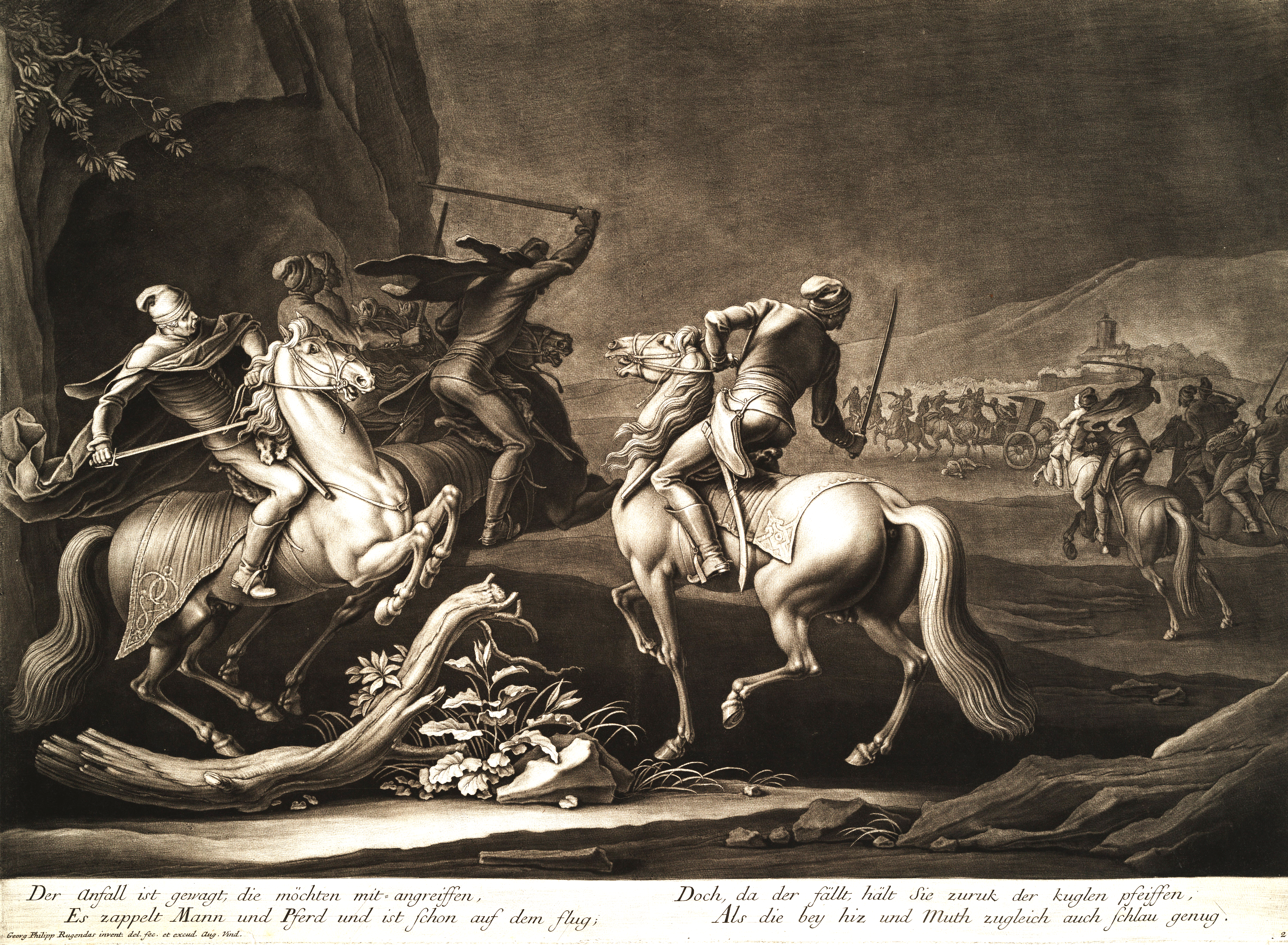
Kuruc preparing to attack traveling coach and riders, c. 1705

Most of the Hungarian nobles did not support Rákóczi's uprising because they considered it to be no more than a jacquerie, a peasant rebellion. Rákóczi's famous call to the nobility of Szabolcs County seemed to be in vain. He, however, managed to convince the Hajdús (emancipated peasant warriors) to join his forces and so his forces controlled most of Kingdom of Hungary east and north of the Danube by late September 1703. He continued by soon conquering Transdanubia.

Since the Austrians had to fight Rákóczi on several fronts, they felt obliged to enter negotiations with him. However, the victory of Austrian and English forces against a combined French-Bavarian army at the Battle of Blenheim on 13 August 1704 not only provided an advantage during the War of the Spanish Succession but also prevented the union of Rákóczi's forces with their French-Bavarian allies.

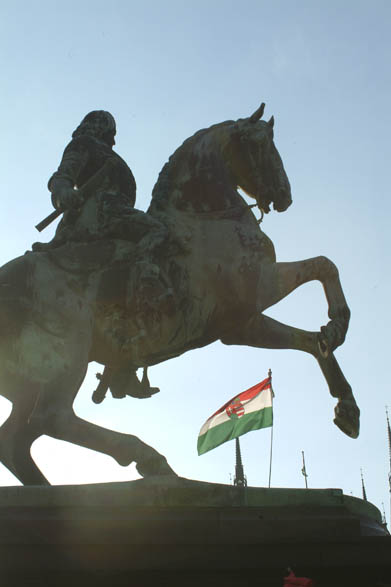
Rákóczi statue in Budapest, Hungary

That placed Rákóczi in a difficult military and financial situation. French support gradually diminished, and a larger army was needed to occupy the already-won land. Meanwhile, supplying the current army with arms and food was beyond his means. He tried to solve the problem by creating a new copper-based coinage, which was not easily accepted in Hungary, whose people were used to silver coins. Nevertheless, Rákóczi managed to maintain his military advantage for a while, but after 1706, his army was forced into retreat.

A meeting of the Hungarian Diet (consisting of 6 bishops, 36 aristocrats and about 1000 representatives of the lower nobility of 25 counties), held near Szécsény (Nógrád County) in September 1705, elected Rákóczi to be the "fejedelem", the (ruling) prince, of the Confederated Estates of the Kingdom of Hungary, to be assisted by a 24-member Senate. Rákóczi and the Senate were assigned joint responsibility for the conduct of foreign affairs, including peace talks.

Encouraged by England and the Netherlands, peace talks started again on 27 October 1705 between the kuruc leaders and the emperor. However, military operations continued, and both sides varied their strategy according to the military situation. On 13 December, kuruc forces, led by János Bottyán, defeated the Austrians at Szentgotthárd. One stumbling block was sovereignty over Transylvania since neither side was prepared to give it up. Rákóczi's proposed treaty with the French was stalled and so he became convinced that only a declaration of independence would make it acceptable for various powers to negotiate with him. In 1706, his wife (whom he had not seen five years, along with their sons József and György) and his sister were sent as peace ambassadors, but Rákóczi rejected their efforts on behalf of the emperor.

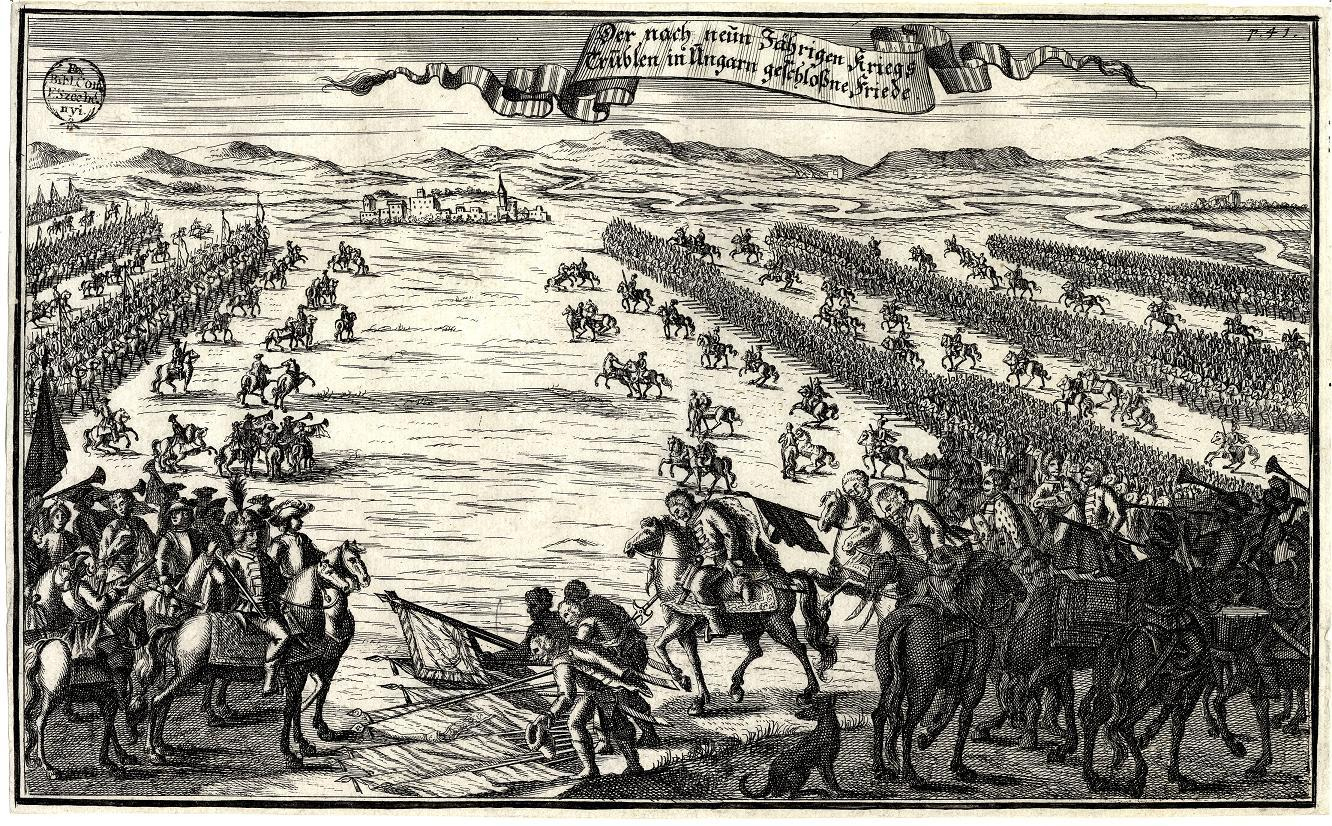
The capitulation of the Kuruc army in 1711

On Rákóczi's recommendation and with Bercsényi's support, another meeting of the Diet held at Ónod (Borsod County) declared the deposition of the House of Habsburg from the Hungarian throne on 13 June 1707. However, neither that act nor the copper currency, which was issued to avoid monetary inflation, was successful. Louis XIV refused to enter into treaties with Rákóczi, which left the Hungarians without allies. There remained the possibility of an alliance with the Russian Tsardom, but that did not materialise either.

At the Battle of Trenčín (Hungarian Trencsén, German Trentschin, Latin Trentsinium, Comitatus Trentsiniensis, today in Slovakia), on 3 August 1708, Rákóczi's horse stumbled, and he fell to the ground, which knocked him unconscious. The kuruc forces thought him dead and fled. The defeat was fatal for the uprising. Numerous kuruc leaders transferred their allegiance to the emperor in the hope for clemency. Rákóczi's forces became restricted to the area around Munkács and Szabolcs County. The Hungarian-Polish-Swedish-French army was close to victory against the Austrians in the Battle of Romhány but after a draw, they did not trust the word of János Pálffy, the emperor's envoy, who was charged with negotiations with the rebels. Rákóczi left the Kingdom of Hungary to Poland on 21 February 1711.

== Foreign soldiers and participants ==
=== Denmark-Norway ===
Denmark–Norway annually provided cavalry and infantry regiments to the Habsburg army, which stationed the Danish regiments in Hungary. That resulted in Danish soldiers fighting alongside the Habsburg army against the Hungarians (kurucs) and their allies. The Danish forces fought in eastern Hungary and Transylvania (Battle of Zsibó).

=== Serbs, Croats and Saxons ===
The Serbs, who had settled in the southern borders of Hungary during the Great Serb Migrations and protected by the Austrians, fought on the emperor's side from the beginning of the war. They were used as light cavalry in the Austrian army and as tax collectors. During the eight years of war, Hungarian villages and towns of the Great Hungarian Plain and Transdanubia were burnt and robbed by the Serbs, and in Bácska, Serb villages were burnt. However, there were some Serbs who fought on Rakóczi's side against the Habsburgs: the Frontiersmen of Semlak (Mezősomlyó). The leader of the Serb kuruc troops was Frontier Captain Obrad Lalić, who was from Zenta.

Croatia also supported the Habsburg Monarchy and thus the Croatian Army and the Habsburg contingents precluded the kuruc occupation of Croatia. Croatian and Serbian forces fought in Transdanubia and Upper Hungary. The Transylvanian Saxons also distanced themselves from Rákóczi in 1703. Although Austrian General Rabutin lost in Transylvania, he retreated into the Saxonland, where Saxon towns and peasants gave shelter to the Habsburg army. Clashes between the Kuruc and Habsburg-Saxon army took place throughout Croatia.

=== Romanians and Slovaks ===
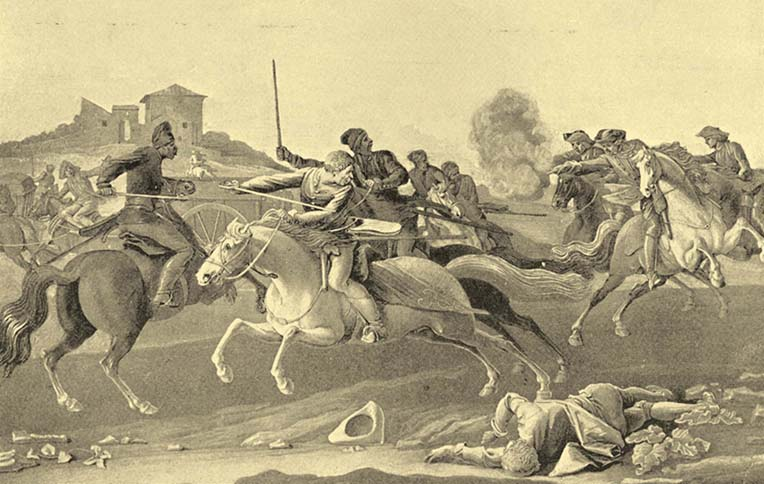
Kuruc–Labanc battle

During the conflict, the Slovaks fought for Rákóczi. In the kuruc army were Slovak commanders, and a few kuruc forces were completely Slovak. After the enfranchisement of Transylvania, the Romanian minority stood en masse with the kurucs, and supported the kuruc Romanian forces. Finally, a few hundred mercenaries from Wallachia and Moldavia fought in Rákóczi's army.

Support among the Hungarian Romanians was, however, not unanimous. Bishop Atanasie Anghel and the Byzantine-Catholic clergy remained staunchly loyal to the Habsburgs, in exchange for privileges for the Romanians. Under Anghel's leadership, the Romanian Greek Catholic Church recruited Romanians to fight alongside the Habsburgs, especially in regions like Mărginimea Sibiului and Țara Bârsei. Most of them served as scouts, supply suppliers, and local defenders for the Imperial garrisons against Kuruc raids. Some Romanian Greek Catholics also served as captains under the Imperial generals, leading small units of local recruits tasked with protecting Imperial communication lines and counter-attacking Kuruc bands.

=== Others ===
Scores of Polish volunteers and mercenaries came from Poland, and many soldiers were Ukrainians and Lipka Tatars also supported the kurucs. Several times, Rákóczi asked for help from Poland and endeavoured to recruit more Polish soldiers. In the Hungarian lands, the Germans Spiš Saxons and some German groups (including renegades from the Habsburg army) joined Rákóczi's war. They were supplemented by German mercenaries. The kuruc army also used commands and oaths in both the Slovak and German languages since there were so many Germans and Slovaks who served in it.

The Rusyn minority in 1703 immediately joined the uprising, but between 1690 and 1702, the Rusyns had supported the Hungarians against the Austrian soldiers. The Hungarian Slovenes from the regions of Muraszombat, Lendva and Szentgotthárd joined the fight against the Habsburg soldiers since the Styrian forces several times foraged in the Slovene villages.

A few hundred Swedish soldiers broke away from the Battle of Poltava, Benderi and Poland in Hungary. In 1710 Rákóczi, admitted the Swedes into the demoralized kuruc army. The Hungarian-Polish-Swedish-French army was close to victory against the Austrians in the Battle of Romhány, but Rákóczi's forces were finally crushed in the course of the Austrian counterattack, which resulted in a draw.

Rákóczi's army also included Bulgarians, Litvins, Crimean Tatars and Ottoman Turks.

== See also ==
- Gabriel Bethlen
- Emeric Thököly
- Bocskai's War of Independence
- Simontornya Castle, used as a stronghold by kuruc rebels
