= Kuruc =

Group of anti-Habsburg insurgents in the Kingdom of Hungary (1671–1711)

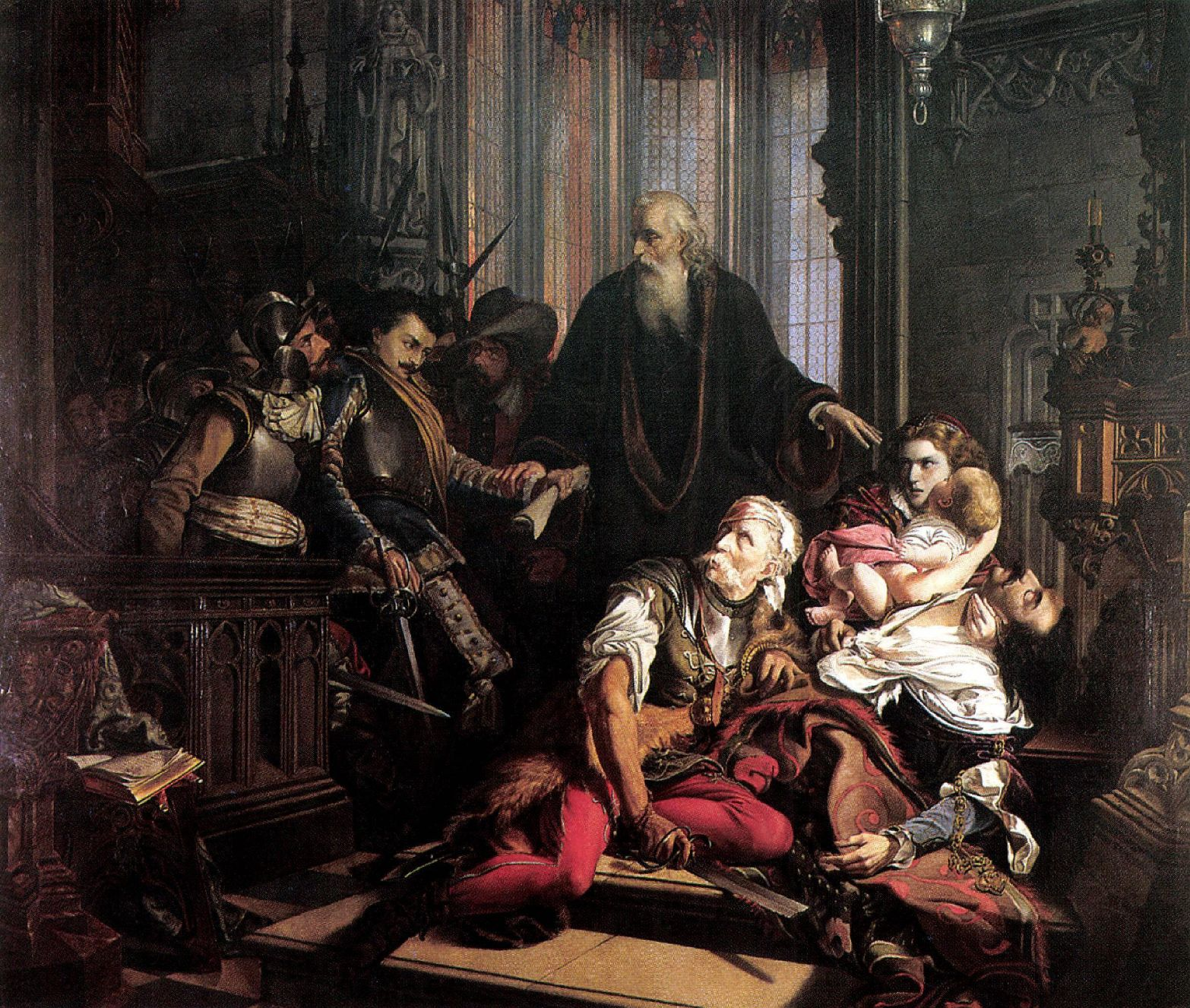
"Kuruc and Labanc", by Viktor Madarász (depicting brothers fighting on opposite sides)

Kuruc (Hungarian: [ˈkurut͡s], plural kurucok (Note: In Hungarian 'kuruc’ is singular, while the plural is ‘kurucok’. In English, the singular is used to denote them as a whole group.)), also spelled kurutz, refers to a group of armed anti-Habsburg insurgents in the Kingdom of Hungary between 1671 and 1711.

Over time, the term kuruc has come to designate Hungarians who advocate strict national independence and the term "labanc" to designate Hungarians who advocate cooperating with outside powers.

The term kuruc is used in both a positive sense to mean "patriotic" and in a negative sense to mean "chauvinistic".

The term labanc is almost always used in a negative sense to mean "disloyal" or "traitorous". This term originally referred to Habsburg troops, mainly Austrian imperial soldiers, garrisoned in Hungary.

The kuruc army was composed mostly of impoverished lower Hungarian nobility and serfs, including Hungarian Protestant peasants and Slavs. They managed to conquer large parts of Hungary in several uprisings from Transylvania before they were defeated by Habsburg imperial troops.

== Name ==
The word kuruc was first used in 1514 for the armed peasants led by György Dózsa. 18th-century scholar Matthias Bel supposed that the word was derived from the Latin word "cruciatus" (crusader), ultimately from "crux" (cross), and that Dózsa's followers were called "crusaders" because the peasant rebellion started as an official crusade against the Ottomans. Silahdar Findiklili Mehmed Agha, a 17th-century Ottoman chronicler, supposed that the word Kuruc ("Kurs" as it was transliterated into Ottoman Turkish in his chronicle) was a Greek word meaning "polished" or "cilâlı" in Turkish.

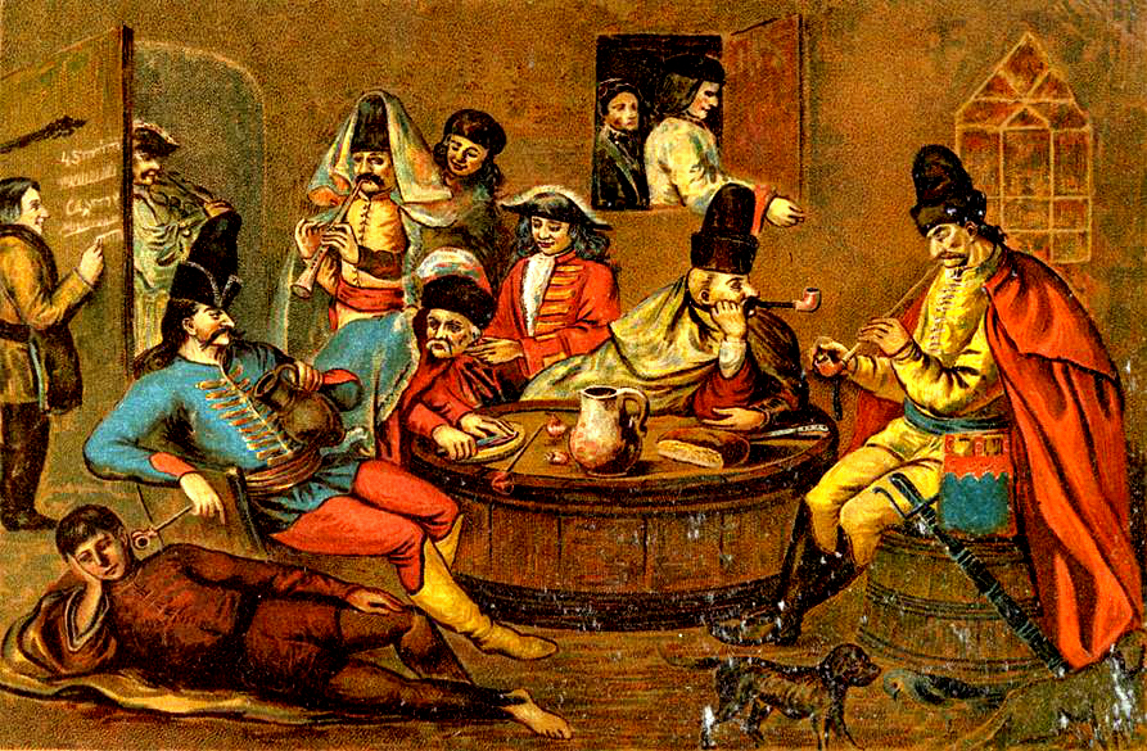
Kuruc, c. 1700

Today's etymologists do not accept Bel's or Mehmed's theory and consider that the word was derived from the Turkish word kurudsch (rebel or insurgent).

In 1671, the name was used by Meni, the beglerbeg pasha of Eger in what is now Hungary, to denote the predominantly-noble refugees from Royal Hungary. The name quickly became popular and was used from 1671 to 1711 in texts written in Hungarian, Slovak and Turkish to denote the rebels of Royal Hungary and northern Transylvania, fighting against the Habsburgs and their policies.

The rebels of the first kuruc uprising called themselves bújdosók (fugitives), or in long form, "different fugitive orders—barons, nobles, cavalry and infantry soldiers—who fight for the material and spiritual liberty of the Hungarian motherland." The army mustered by the northern Hungarian noble Emeric Thököly was also called kuruc. Their uprising forced the Habsburg emperor Leopold I to restore the constitution in 1681 after it was suspended in 1673.

The leader of the last of the kuruc rebellions, Francis II Rákóczi, did not use the term, instead using the French word insurgents or malcontents to highlighting their purposes. Contemporary sources also preferred the term "malcontents" to denote the rebels.

Kuruc was used in Slovak popular poetry until the 19th century. The opposite term (widespread after 1678) was "labanc" (from the Hungarian word lobonc, lit. 'long hair', referring to the wigs worn by the Austrian soldiers), denoting Austrians and their loyalist supporters.

== History ==
=== Background ===
After the Magnate conspiracy and rebellion of Francis I Rákóczi, Leopold I introduced an absolutistic government system in Royal Hungary (which was not occupied by the Ottomans and was not part of the Transylvanian Principality).

The creators of this system were Wenzel Eusebius Lobkowitz (President of the Imperial Privy Council 1669-1674), Johann von Hocher, Ignaz Abele, Leopold Königsegg-Rothenfels, Johann Kinsky (Johann Oktavian, Graf Kinsky von Wchinitz und Tettau 1604-1679) and Raimondo Montecuccoli. They also invented the Verwirkungstheorie. Hungarian Estates forfeited their rights because of this conspiracy. The emperor then had the right to govern without asking the Diet (parliament of the Estates). Königsegg said the Hungarian Kingdom was "armis subjecti."

They enforced local inhabitants to maintain the army supplies (portio [food], quarters [accommodation] and forspont [delivery]) collected by the local military officers (repartitio). They neglected traditional government officials such as nádor and created a governing council in March 1673 (which consisted of four German and four Hungarian members and one leader, Johann Gaspar Ampringen, but he was only a puppet and the real power was held by the local military leaders).

The court tried again to suppress the Protestants. In 1671, György Szepelcsenyi, the Archbishop of Esztergom, Leopold Kollonics, bishop of Weiner-Neustadt and the President of the Hungarian Chamber, Ferenc Szegedy, Bishop of Eger, and István Bársony visited the free and important towns one by one with military escorts and took back former (more than 100 years earlier) Catholic churches and schools from Protestants. Citizens of Pozsony, including both men and women, guarded their church for weeks Szelepcsényi was not able to fight against them until, in 1672, Kollonics took matters into his own hands. He brought 1,200 soldiers from Vienna, arresting the nobler citizens for a few weeks and forcing them to hand over their church and school. After that, they built conceptual lawsuits against Protestant pastors. Between 1673 and 1674, they twice made "judicum delegatum" against Protestant priests. The jury members were high priests and secular lords including the judge and other legislatures. The subject of the coup was political crimes — the connection of the Lutheran and Reformed pastors with the pasha of Buda and the plan of an open rebellion, the main evidence of which was the indictment of István Vitnyédy's letters to Miklós Bethlen and Ambrus Keczer. In the end, whoever signed a reversal (a document to resign work as a Protestant priest and leave Hungary) were pardoned. 200 signed, but 40 resisted. Those who refused were sold as galley slaves to Naples (to be saved by Admiral Ruttler's fleet in 1676).

Officials were often corrupt and greedy. For example, von Sinzendorf, who handled military finances, confiscated many noble people's properties. During one negotiation, he confiscated 11 castles, 70 noble curia and 367 villages (mostly embezzled for himself).

Leopold I dismissed 11,000 Hungarian fortress soldiers because he did not trust them, tried to concentrate the military into some main fortress and started to explode the nobility's enstrengthed castles.

The government levied a new kind of tax (Accisa) which raised taxation rates 10 times higher. This caused taxpayers to suffer.

The members of the Wesselényi conspiracy, mostly nobles who lost their estates and the ex-soldiers who were dismissed without severance pay, fled east. The oppressed Hungarians sought refuge in Transylvania, but the Prince Apafi didn't have permission from the Ottomans to let them in, so they started to gather by the Tisza river. Although many of them escaped to Poland, those left were ready to start a new uprising and then became the kurucs.

=== The first kuruc uprising ===
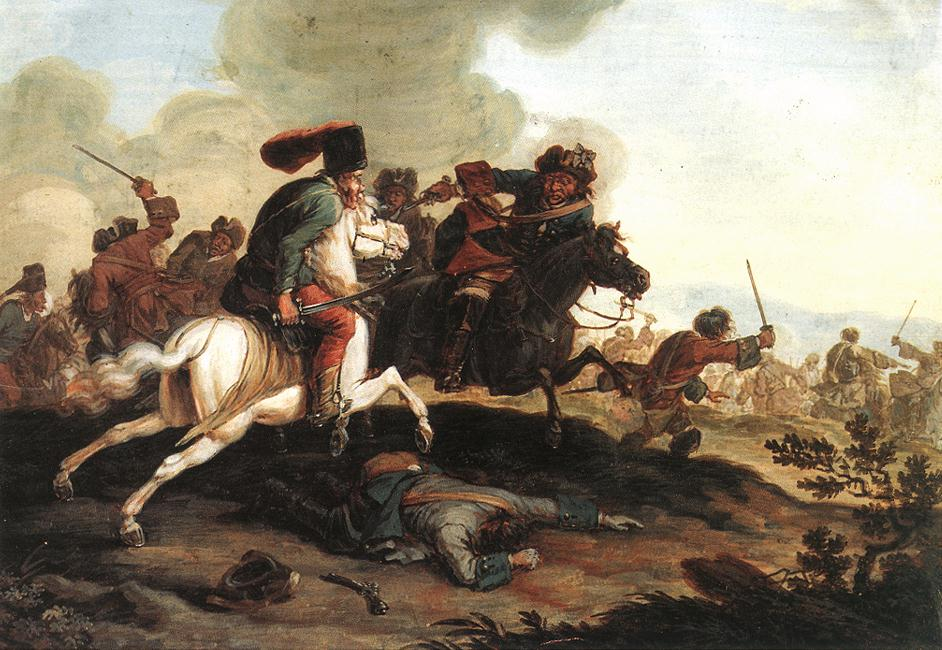
Kuruc-Labanc battle

The first kuruc uprising occurred in 1672. The kuruc army gathered in the Partium where many refugees of different origins took shelter from religious and political persecution in Royal Hungary. They called themselves bújdosók (fugitives). Their weapons were mostly pistols, light sabres and fokos (battle-axes).

Their war tactics were typical of light cavalry. The main subgroups were Protestants, who were disgruntled by the Habsburg ambitions of the Counter-Reformation; impoverished minor nobles (holding on to their privileges while the Habsburg Court attempted to deprive them of their nobility) and soldiers from the végvárs (frontier castles) who were sacked by Habsburg generals. Later, when the Turks lost ground to the imperial armies and Austrian despotism intensified, the Habsburg oppression of Hungarians played an increasingly important role in the motivation of the kuruc.

Initially, in August 1672, the kuruc army invaded Upper Hungary, where they conquered the castles of Diósgyőr, Ónod, Szendrő and Tokaj. After they defeated the Habsburg army of Paris von Spankau near Kassa, the towns of Upper Hungary surrendered and many disaffected people joined them from the Slovak and Ruthenian population of the northern counties.

The two leaders of the army of "fugitives" were Pál Szepesi and Mátyás Szuhay, members of the minor nobility who previously took part in other anti-Habsburg movements.

According to the recollections of Pál Szepesi, the "fugitives" began looting in the northern countries: "In the guise of persecuting the Papists they pillaged whole counties. We began killing the plunderers but to no avail—they didn't respect any officers."

The Hofkriegsrat of Vienna immediately took measures: they strengthened the Habsburg troops, called more soldiers from Lower Hungary and made peace with the Hajduks. On 26 October 1672, the Habsburg army defeated the "fugitives" at Gyurke (later Hungarian Györke, Slovak Ďurkov). The rebels retreated across the line of the Tisza.

After this initial success, the Habsburg government began systematic religious and political persecution in Royal Hungary. The Palatine of Hungary was suspended and in its place Emperor Leopold I appointed a Directorium to administer Hungary in 1673, led by Johann Caspar von Ampringen, the Grand Master of the Teutonic Order, which engaged in severe repression against dissidents. The most infamous case was the trial of 300 Protestant pastors who were sentenced to death in 1674, and who were later sold as galley slaves in Naples, causing public outcry across Europe.

=== Universitas of the "fugitives" ===
In 1675, the "fugitives" occupied Debrecen. Later that year, the town was sacked again by three different armies. This was not uncommon in troubled Upper Hungary.

The fugitives tried to organise themselves as an independent community called "universitas" or "communitas." They issued decrees, sent envoys to foreign powers, made a seal and held Diets (assemblies). At the time, they were already called kuruc, though they never called themselves such. Between 1674 and 1678, their leader was Count Paul Wesselényi, the cousin of the late Palatine Ferenc Wesselényi.

The "fugitives" established diplomatic connections with Poland in 1674 and with France in 1675. In May 1677, France, Poland, the Principality of Transylvania and the universitas of the "Fugitives" signed a treaty in Warsaw by which King Louis XIV of France guaranteed 100,000 thalers aid and assistance. The "fugitives" were obliged to attack the Habsburgs with an army of at least 15,000 men. Michael I Apafi, the Prince of Transylvania, gave military and financial support to the universitas.

In the autumn of 1677, 2,000 French, Polish and Tatar soldiers arrived in Upper Hungary. This small army, led by colonel Beaumont, wasn't able to seriously threaten Habsburg supremacy, although Habsburg control over Hungary declined in 1677 as Johann Caspar von Ampringen left the region. Royal Hungary became one theatre of the European war between Emperor Leopold I and Louis XIV. The president of the Viennese Hofkriegsrat, Raimondo Montecuccoli, drew a plan of "pacification" under the title "L'Ungheria nell'anno 1677." According to the plan, Royal Hungary would be occupied by three Austrian armies, the remnants of the Hungarian constitution abolished and a grand-scale program of German colonisation implemented. Chancellor Paul Hocher, one of the most influential men in the Habsburg government, agreed with Montecuccoli's plan. In the Privy Council he declared, "All Hungarians are traitors."

=== Under Mihály Teleki ===
In 1678, the fugitives accepted Mihály Teleki, the Chancellor of Transylvania, as their leader. Prince Apafi proclaimed war against the Habsburgs. Previously, he had begged the Ottoman Sultan (his overlord) to leave. The Sultan had demanded an unacceptable condition: in the case of success, all Royal Hungary should join the Ottoman Empire.

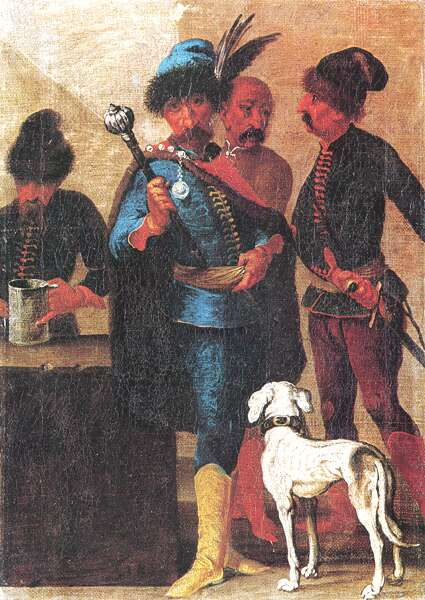
Kuruc soldiers

On 5 April 1678, Prince Apafi issued an ambiguous declaration to the people of Hungary. He announced that he, along with the Polish and French kings, took up the arms against "the heavy yoke of oppression" and recommended "the submission to the mighty Turkish Emperor with a reasonable mind and sharp eye."

The kuruc army of Teleki, together with the Polish and French troops, advanced well into Upper Hungary but immediately retreated into Transylvania at the sight of the first Habsburg regiments. The failure wrecked Teleki's image as a competent leader. On the other hand, a small kuruc cavalry troop (about 8,000 people) briefly occupied the most important mining towns and castles of Lower Hungary.

=== The great kuruc uprisings ===
In 1678, one of the most influential young noblemen of Upper Hungary and Transylvania, Emeric Thököly, declared war against the Habsburgs. In August 1678, Thököly's army occupied almost all of Lower and Upper Hungary. Habsburg rule in Royal Hungary quickly collapsed. The fugitives joined the Thököly Uprising and officially elected him as their leader in Szoboszló in January 1680. The kuruc troops merged with Thököly's own army, although changing fortunes and Thököly's subsequent alliance with the Ottomans would split the movement. In 1681, Emperor Leopold I re-established the Palatine of Hungary, and thus some grievances were removed and a less repressive policy was adopted, but this did not deter the Hungarians from revolting again.

That time onwards, the history of the kurucs is synonymous with that of the two great anti-Habsburg uprisings in the Kingdom of Hungary between 1680 and 1711, i.e. the Thököly Uprising (1680–85) and Rákóczi's War of Independence (1703–1711). Although they are generally called kuruc wars, these anti-Habsburg uprisings had a much wider social base and more complex political aims than the original kuruc movements.

=== Later usage ===
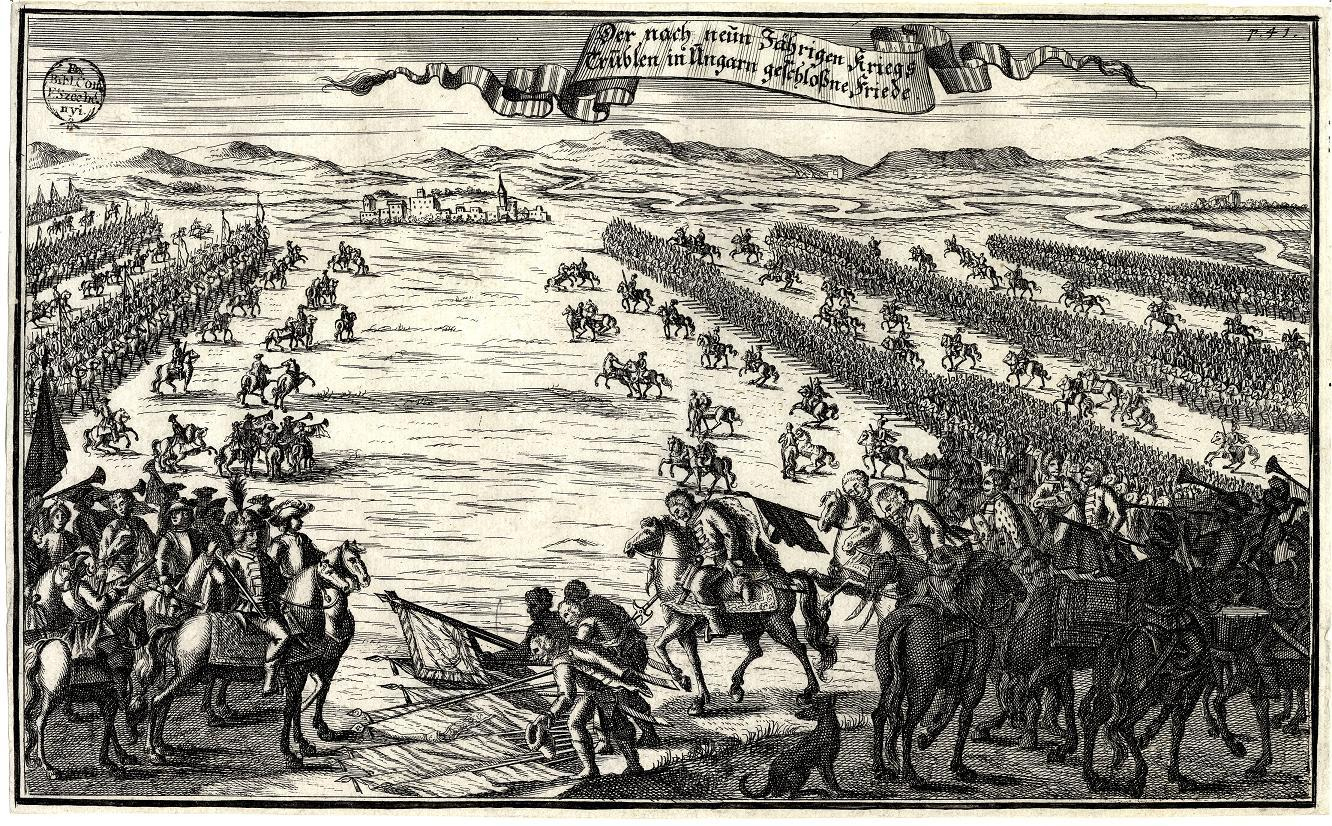
The capitulation of the Kuruc army in 1711

In the first half of the 18th century, "kuruc" was generally used to denote Hungarian cavalry soldiers (hussars) serving in the Habsburg army, especially in the time of the War of the Austrian Succession (1740–1748). Many former kuruc soldiers of Rákóczi's War of Independence joined the Habsburg army after 1711.

The Prussians were also called kurucs in Hungarian literature, including by József Gvadányi in 1790. The reason behind this strange usage was that the enemies of the labanc Habsburgs were considered synonymous with the kurucs.

At the end of the 18th century, the word went out of usage in common parlance and became an exclusively historical term for the rebels of Rákóczi and Thököly.

In present-day South German language, Kruzitürken is a swear word, combining Kuruzen (Kuruc) and Türken (Turks), meaning "curse it."

In present-day Hungarian language, kuruc is sometimes used to denote Hungarian national radicals. "Kuruc.info" is also the name of a far-right, nationalist Hungarian webpage.
