= Borša Castle =

Historic site in Slovakia

Borša
- Borša, Košice Region, Slovakia
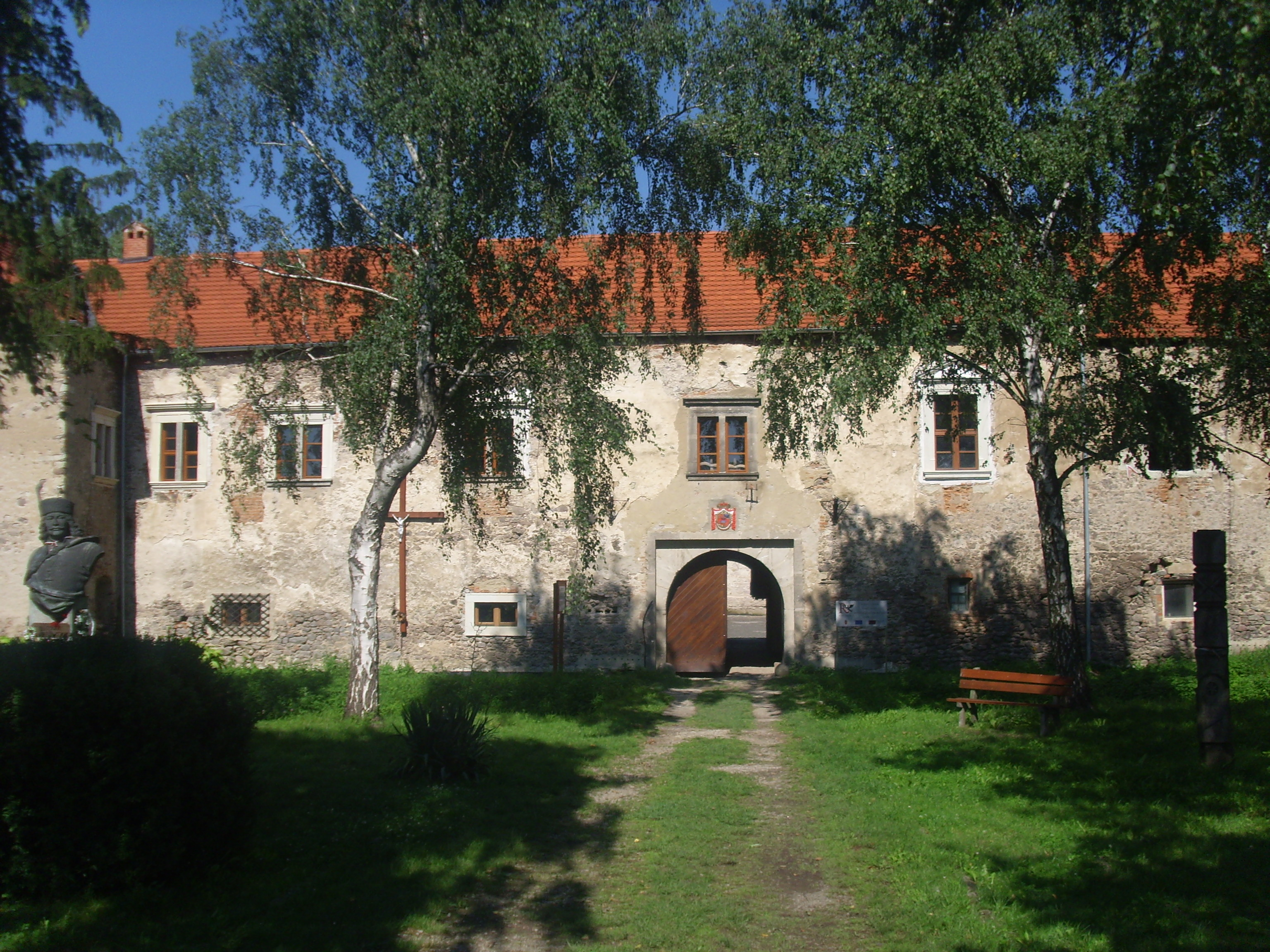

Site information
- Type: Castle

Location
- Coordinates: 48.389167°N 21.705556°E

Borša is a defunct castle, on whose site a chateau was built in the 16th century. The castle is located in the village of Borša in the Košice Region of Slovakia. Originally it was probably a moated castle. The castle is most known as the birthplace of the Hungarian national hero and Kuruc leader Francis II Rákóczi.

== History ==
The predecessor of the current castle was a medieval moated castle, protected by moats fed by water from the Bodrog River. The stone castle likely dates back to the early 13th century. While its exact appearance is unknown, it is known to have belonged to families such as the Perínyi and Polónyi families.

In 1570, a Renaissance castle was built, incorporating some of the castle's remains. Miklós Zeleméry Kamarás, from the area of what would later become Hajdú County, is credited as the builder. In 1602, the castle passed into the hands of the Lórantffy family, and in 1616 it became the property of the Rákóczi family. Originally L-shaped, the castle now has an irregular U-shaped floor plan due to later additions of outbuildings. A bastion, possibly a remnant of the medieval keep, stood at the junction of the two older wings. Renaissance vaults still adorn the castle today. The old moats are partially preserved on the exterior, and the castle park, with the exception of a small section, is now built over by village houses.

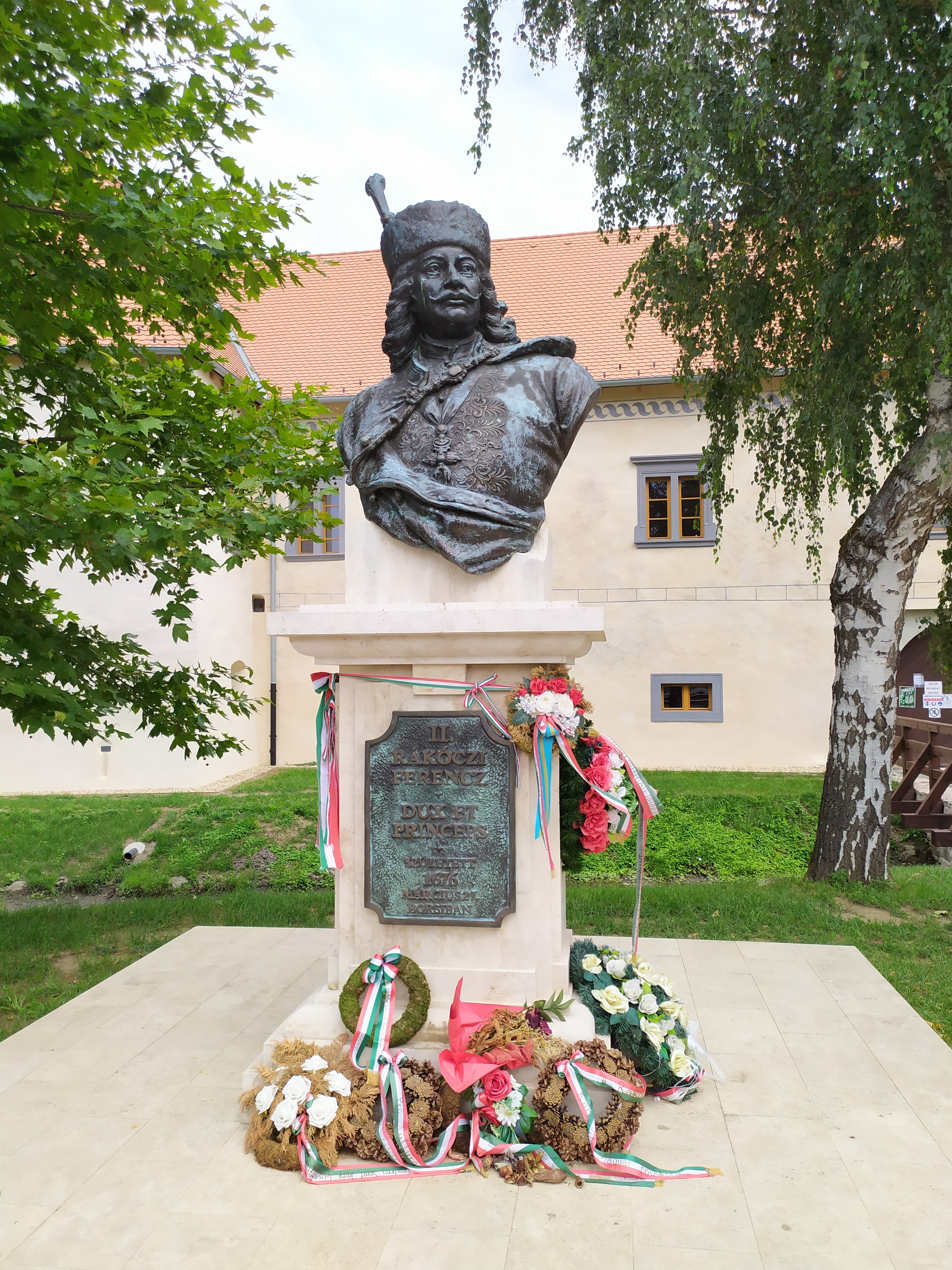
Statue of Francis II Rákóczi, located outside of the castle

The castle is primarily known as the birthplace of the Hungarian national hero and Kuruc leader Francis II Rákóczi, who was born here on March 27, 1676. However, he only stayed at the castle for a short time and grew up mainly at Munkács Castle (now Palanok Castle in Ukraine). A bust by J. Mayer, created in 1907, commemorates his birth. During the Hungarian Revolutions, the castle suffered damage several times and was subsequently renovated on a smaller scale in the 18th and again in the 20th centuries. With the Treaty of Trianon in 1920, the town of Borsi (since then Borša), including the castle, became part of Czechoslovakia. Following the First Vienna Award, Czechoslovakia was forced to cede the territory to Horthy's Hungary. During World War II, the castle housed a small museum. After the war and the restoration of Czechoslovakia in 1945, the castle was used partly as a warehouse and partly as a primary school. However, due to a lack of renovation, it gradually fell into disrepair.

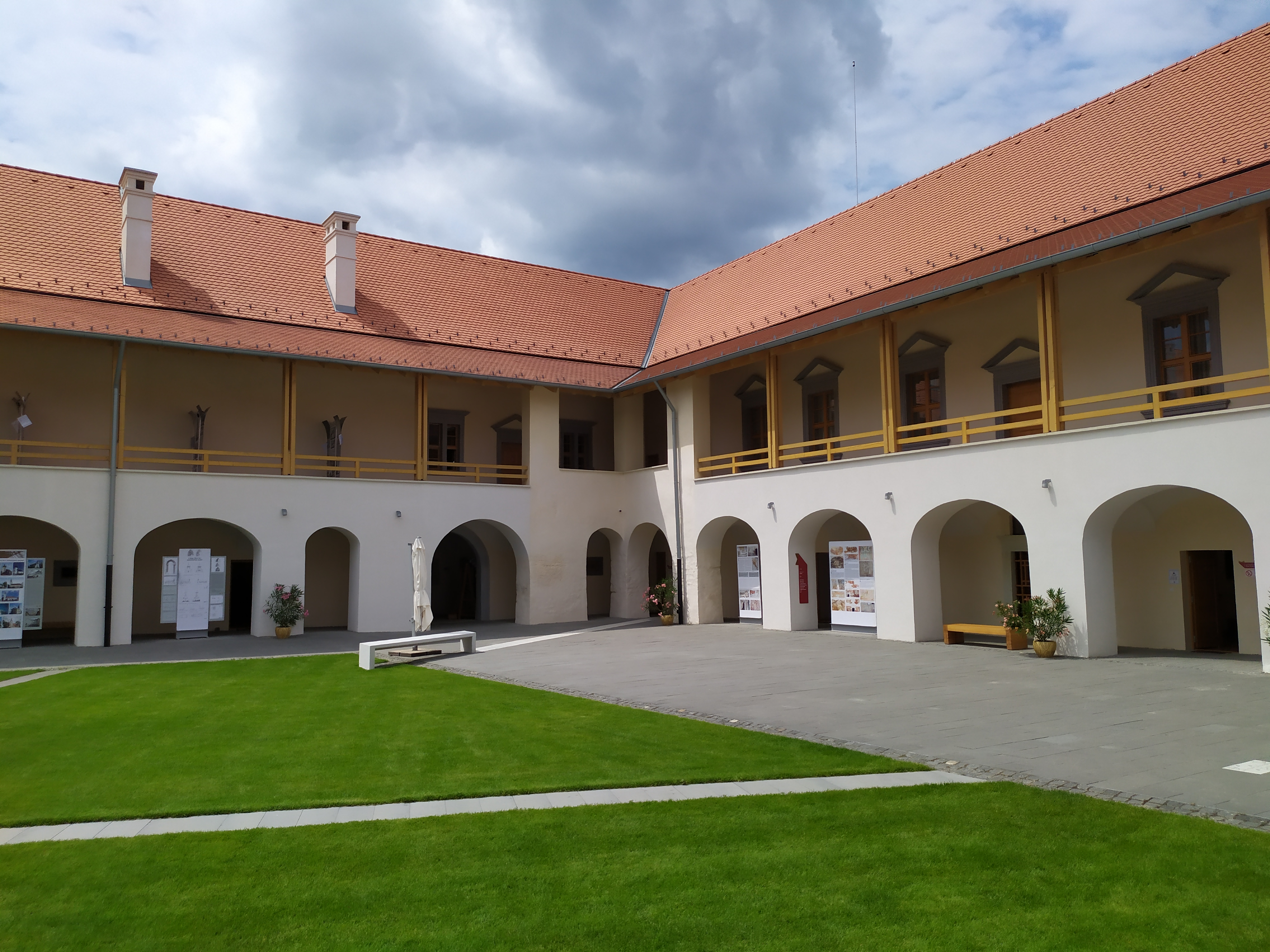
Inside the castle

In 1990, the property became the property of the municipality of Borša, which has since been working to restore it. After a joint study by Slovak and Hungarian heritage preservation societies in 1998, a reconstruction began, but progress was slow due to a lack of funds. In the restored sections, the municipality operates a museum dedicated to the history of the castle and the Rákóczi family. In 2013, the then Slovak and Hungarian heads of state, Ivan Gašparovič and János Áder, agreed to jointly support the renovation project. The extensive refurbishment began in 2018 and was completed after three years. On June 19, 2021, the renovated castle was officially opened in a ceremony attended by Presidents Zuzana Čaputová and János Áder.

== Renovation ==
The castle, nationalized in 1945, became the property of the Borša municipality in 1990. The renovation of the castle began in 2000, organized by the mayor's office of the small village, Mayor Mihály Szabó, primarily using Slovak and Hungarian state and European Union funds. The plans were prepared jointly by architect Zoltán Wittinger from the State Monument Restoration and Restoration Center in Budapest and architect Péter Pásztor from Košice. According to the plans, the castle will house a museum, conference center, library, internet café, hotel and restaurant. In 2005, several ground-floor rooms were renovated, and in 2006, the birth memorial room was renewed. In February 2018, Csaba Latorcai, Deputy State Secretary for Social and Heritage Affairs and Priority Cultural Investments at the Prime Minister's Office, announced on site that the castle would be completely renovated in two phases with a 1.6 billion forint grant from the Hungarian government. The renovation was completed by spring 2021, with Zoltán Wittinger as the lead architect. Following the reconstruction, the 13-room 'Brigadéros' hotel, named after the brigadiers of Francis II Rákóczi, opened.
