= József Rákóczi =

Joseph Rákóczi
- Duke of Munkács
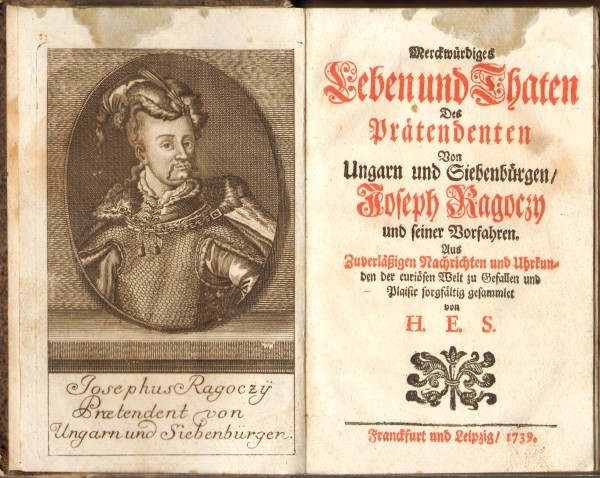
- Born: 1700; Vienna, Holy Roman Empire
- Died: 1738 (aged 37–38); Chervena Voda, Ottoman Empire (now Bulgaria, Ruse Municipality)
- House: Rákóczi
- Father: Francis II Rákóczi
- Mother: Charlotte Amalie of Hesse-Wanfried

Joseph Rákóczi (Hungarian: Rákóczi József; 17 August 1700 – 10 November 1738) was the second son of Francis II Rákóczi and Charlotte Amalie of Hesse-Wanfried.

== Life ==
Joseph Rákóczi was born on 17 August 1700 at Vienna in the family of Francis II Rákóczi and Charlotte Amalie of Hesse-Wanfried. At that time, his father was imprisoned in the fortress of Wiener Neustadt (south of Vienna) on accusations of correspondence with France for support of the cause of Hungarian independence. When Francis II Rákóczi managed to escape from prison and fled to Poland, his two sons, Joseph and George, stayed in Vienna and were raised as members of the German nobility, loyal to the Holy Roman Emperor. He even received the title of Marquis of San Marco as one of the attempts to separate him with his family and past.

In 1734, his father granted him the title of Duke of Munkács. At that time, Francis II Rákóczi was in exile at Rodosto with the protection of the Ottoman Sultan Mahmud I. After receiving the title, Joseph Rákóczi escaped from Vienna and traveled to Rome, Naples, Paris and Madrid.

After the death of Francis II Rákóczi, Joseph came to Rodosto at the invitation of his father’s fellows in exile as the rightful heir. In the summer of 1737, a war broke out between Austria and the Ottoman Empire, and the Sultan recognized Joseph as the candidate for Prince of Transylvania. However, the Ottoman forces were defeated, and on 10 November 1738, Joseph Rákóczi died in Chervena Voda (now in Bulgaria).
