= Salomea Halpir =

18th century physician

Salomea Halpir (1718 – after 1763) was a Polish–Lithuanian medic and oculist. She often earns the title of the first female doctor from the Grand Duchy of Lithuania. What is known about her life is known from her memoirs, written in 1760, which is a unique example of travel memoir and women's literature. Halpir expressed decidedly un-womanly characteristics and ambitions. Instead of dedicating her life to raising children and being a good wife, as dictated by the 18th-century social norms, Halpir strove to become a successful medical doctor and expressed her hunger for travel and adventure.

== Names ==
She is known under a great variety of names. Her first name is often given as Salomea, Salome, or Salomėja. In her memoir, she referred to herself as Salomea, but she signed the dedication as Regina. Her maiden name is rendered as Rusiecki, Rusiecka, Ruseckaitė, Rusieckich. Halpir or Halpirowa is her married name from the first marriage. Her name from the second marriage is rendered as Pilstein, Pilsztyn, Pilsztynowa, Pilštyniova, or Pichelstein. Even after bitter divorce from her second husband she continued to use his last name, perhaps because it sounded more noble. In the dedication of her memoir she used the fourth surname – Makowska. It has been suggested that it is the surname of her third husband, but the origin of that surname remains unknown.

== Life and medical career ==
Halpir was born near Navahrudak, Grand Duchy of Lithuania, to the family of Joachim Rusiecki of petty nobility. At the age of 14 she was married off to a German Lutheran oculist Dr. Jacob Halpir. The couple moved to Constantinople, Ottoman Empire, where Dr. Halpir practiced medicine and had many clients while facing cut-throat competition from Jewish and Muslim doctors. Despite, or perhaps because of, her being a poorly educated Christian woman in an Islamic country, Halpir was trained by her husband and assisted him in his operations eventually becoming an accomplished physician herself, with a specialty in cataract surgery. Her status as a female helped her find a niche serving female patients and her status as a foreigner helped her skirt Islamic traditions that severely limited women's freedom. Halpir never received any formal training in medicine.

Later, her husband fell ill. He died leaving Halpir with their 2-year-old daughter, Constance. After this, Halpir embarked on an extensive journey throughout Europe. During the Austro-Russian–Turkish War (1735–39), she bought four Austrian prisoners of war. Three of them were ransomed by relatives while the fourth, ensign Pilstein, became her second husband. She traveled to Poland where Michał Kazimierz "Rybeńko" Radziwiłł made her husband an officer and offered her the position of doctor's residence in Nesvizh. Harpin traveled to Saint Petersburg to free some Turkish prisoners of war. There she gained access to the imperial court and met Empress Anna of Russia and future Empress Elizabeth of Russia. After several months she returned to Poland. She divorced her second husband, with whom she had two sons, after she accused him of adultery, attempting to poison her, and extortion.

She moved to Vienna where Prince József Rákóczi fell in love with her, but she declined his marriage proposal. Halpir became romantically involved with a Polish nobleman, seven years her junior, who took advantage of her wealth. She also accused him of starving one of her sons to death. She returned to Constantinople and became a physician of the women in the harem of sultan Mustafa III. From 1759 to 1760, she treated Esma Sultan (1726-1788), sister of Mustafa III, who would subsequently be treated by two additional eye specialists from 1766 to 1771.

Until recently, Salomea Halpir's life after 1760, when she completed her memoir, was unknown. Dariusz Kołodziejczyk has found that in 1763 she was employed as a physician in the Khan's harem in Bakhchysarai and as such she served as an informant of the Russian consul Aleksandr Nikiforov.

== Autobiography ==
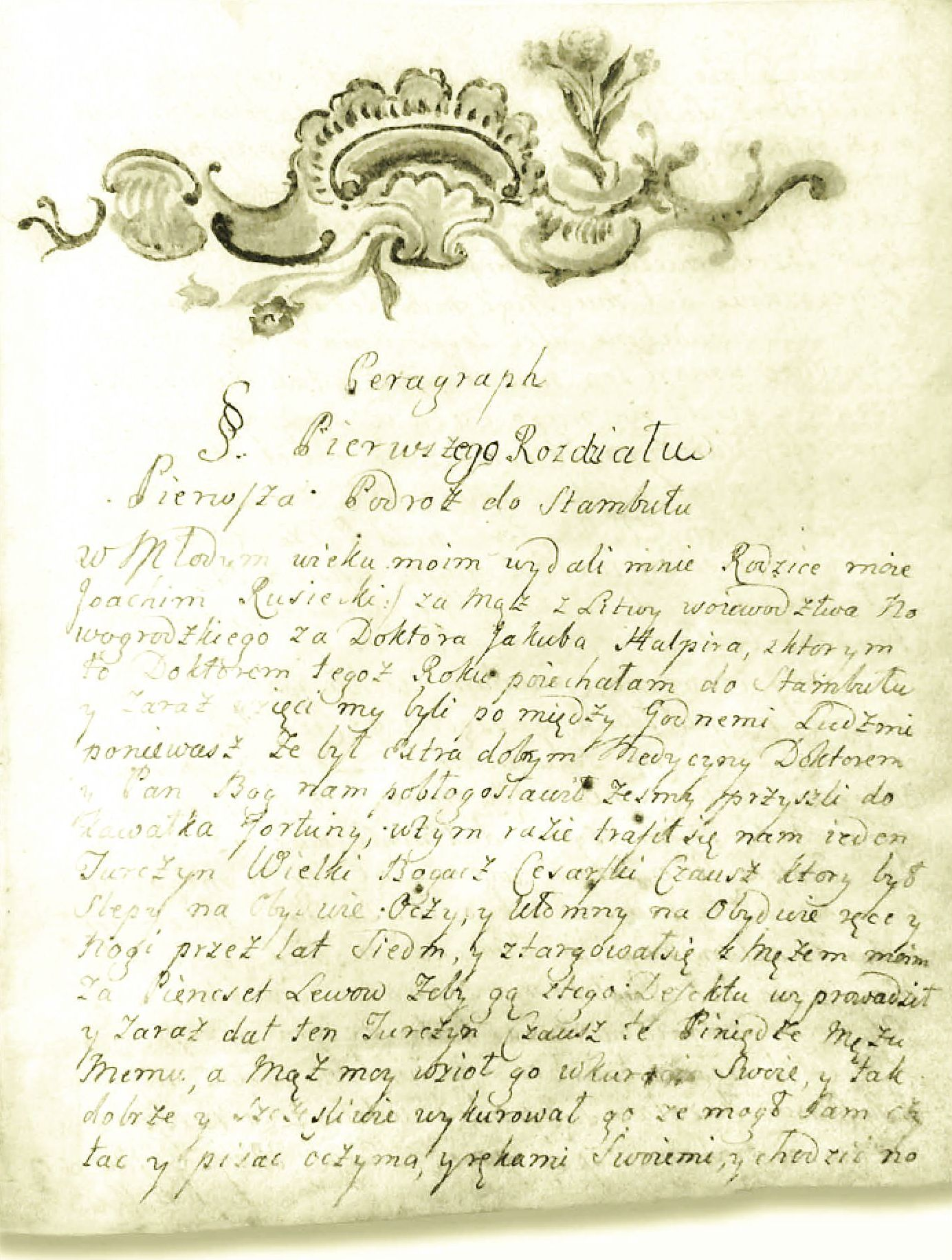
The first page of her memoir

Halpir's 388-page autobiography was discovered by a Polish historian Glatman in the library of Prince Czartoryski. The memoir was published as Proceder podróży i życia mego awantur (My Life's Travels and Adventures) in Poland in 1957. A number of the events in the memoir seem far-fetched and implausible. For example, she described how her leg became limp and visibly shorter due to a magic omen. Therefore, biographical accuracy of her memoir is disputed and some researchers prefer to treat it more as a work of fiction than a factual autobiography.
