= Francis II Rákóczi =

Hungarian revolutionary (1676–1735)

- Prince of Transylvania, Ruling Prince of Hungary in wartime
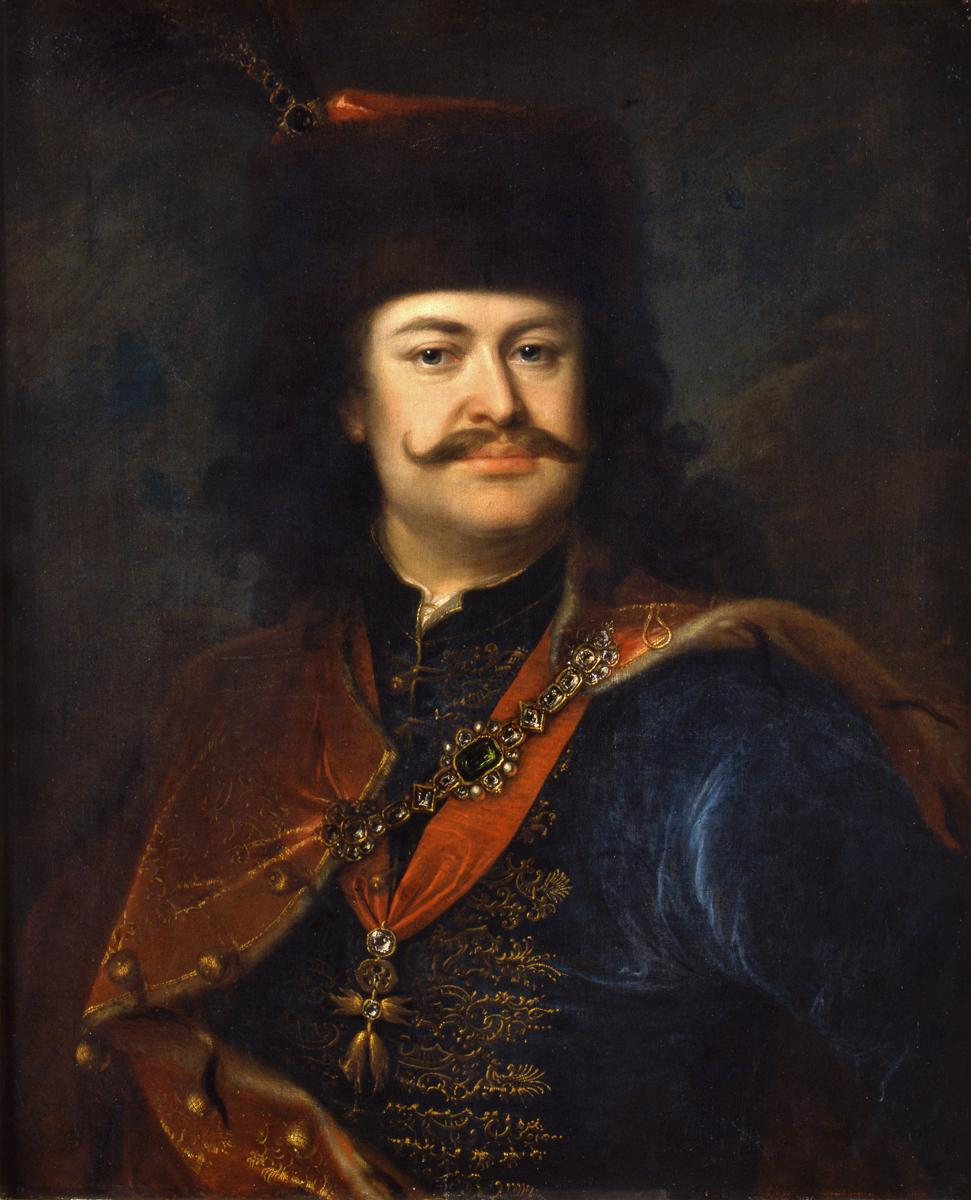
- 1712 portrait of Rákóczi by Ádám Mányoki

Prince of Transylvania
- Reign: 1704 – 1711
- Predecessor: Leopold I
- Successor: Charles IV
- Born: 27 March 1676; Borsi, Royal Hungary (now Borša, Slovakia)
- Died: 8 April 1735 (aged 59); Tekirdağ, Ottoman Empire (now Tekirdağ, Turkey)
- Burial: 1906; St. Elisabeth Cathedral, Kassa, Kingdom of Hungary (now Košice, Slovakia)
- Spouse: Sarolta Amália (Charlotte Amalie of Hesse-Wanfried)
- Issue: Leopold Rákóczi; József Rákóczi; György Rákóczi; Sarolta Rákóczi
- House: Rákóczi
- Father: Francis I Rákóczi
- Mother: Ilona Zrínyi
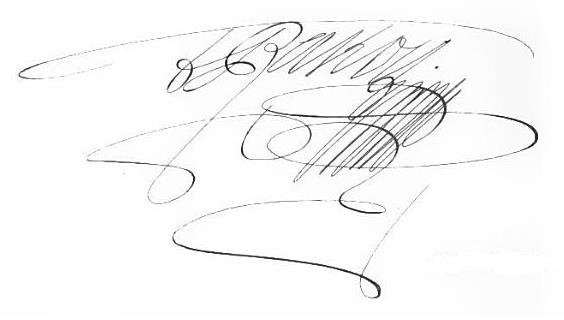
- Signature

Francis II Rákóczi (Hungarian: II. Rákóczi Ferenc, Hungarian pronunciation: [ˈraːkoːt͡si ˈfɛrɛnt͡s]; 27 March 1676 – 8 April 1735) was a Hungarian nobleman and leader of the Rákóczi's War of Independence against the Habsburgs in 1703–1711 as the prince (Hungarian: fejedelem) of the Estates Confederated for Liberty of the Kingdom of Hungary. He was also Prince of Transylvania, an Imperial Prince, and a member of the Order of the Golden Fleece. Today he is considered a national hero in Hungary.

His name is historically also spelled Rákóczy, in Hungarian: II. Rákóczi Ferenc, in Slovak: František II. Rákoci, in German: Franz II. Rákóczi, in Croatian: Franjo II. Rákóczy (Rakoci, Rakoczy), in Romanian: Francisc Rákóczi al II-lea, in Serbian: Ференц II Ракоци.

Although the Hungarian parliament offered Rákóczi the royal crown, he refused it, choosing instead the temporary title of the "Ruling Prince of Hungary". Rákóczi intended to bear this military-sounding title only during the anti-Habsburg war of independence. By refusing the royal crown, he proclaimed to Hungary that it was not his personal ambition that drove the war of liberation against the Habsburg dynasty.

== Childhood ==
He was the richest landlord in the Kingdom of Hungary and the count (comes perpetuus) of the Comitatus Sarossiensis (in Hungarian Sáros), now in northeastern Slovakia, from 1694 on. He was the third of three children born to Francis I Rákóczi, elected ruling prince of Transylvania, and Ilona Zrínyi, who was the daughter of Petar Zrinski, Ban of Croatia, and niece of Petar's older brother, Miklós Zrínyi. His paternal grandfather George Rákóczi II and great-grandfather George I Rákóczi were also princes of Transylvania. He was born in the Borša Castle. He had a brother, George, who died as a baby before Francis was born, and a sister, Julianna Rákóczi, later Countess of Aspremont-Lynden, who was four years older than Francis. His father died when he was four months old.

Upon Ferenc I's death, his widow requested guardianship of her children; however, the advisors of Emperor Leopold I insisted that he retain guardianship of both Ferenc and his sister, especially as Francis I had willed this before death. Despite further difficulties, Zrínyi was able to raise her children, while the Emperor retained legal guardianship. The family lived in the castle of Munkács (today Mukacheve, in Ukraine), Sárospatak and Regéc until 1680, when Ferenc's paternal grandmother, Sofia Báthory, died. Then, they moved permanently into the castle of Munkács. Rákóczi retained strong affection for this place throughout his life. Aside from his mother, Rákóczi's key educators were György Kőrössy, castellan to the family, and János Badinyi.

== End of the Thököly uprising ==
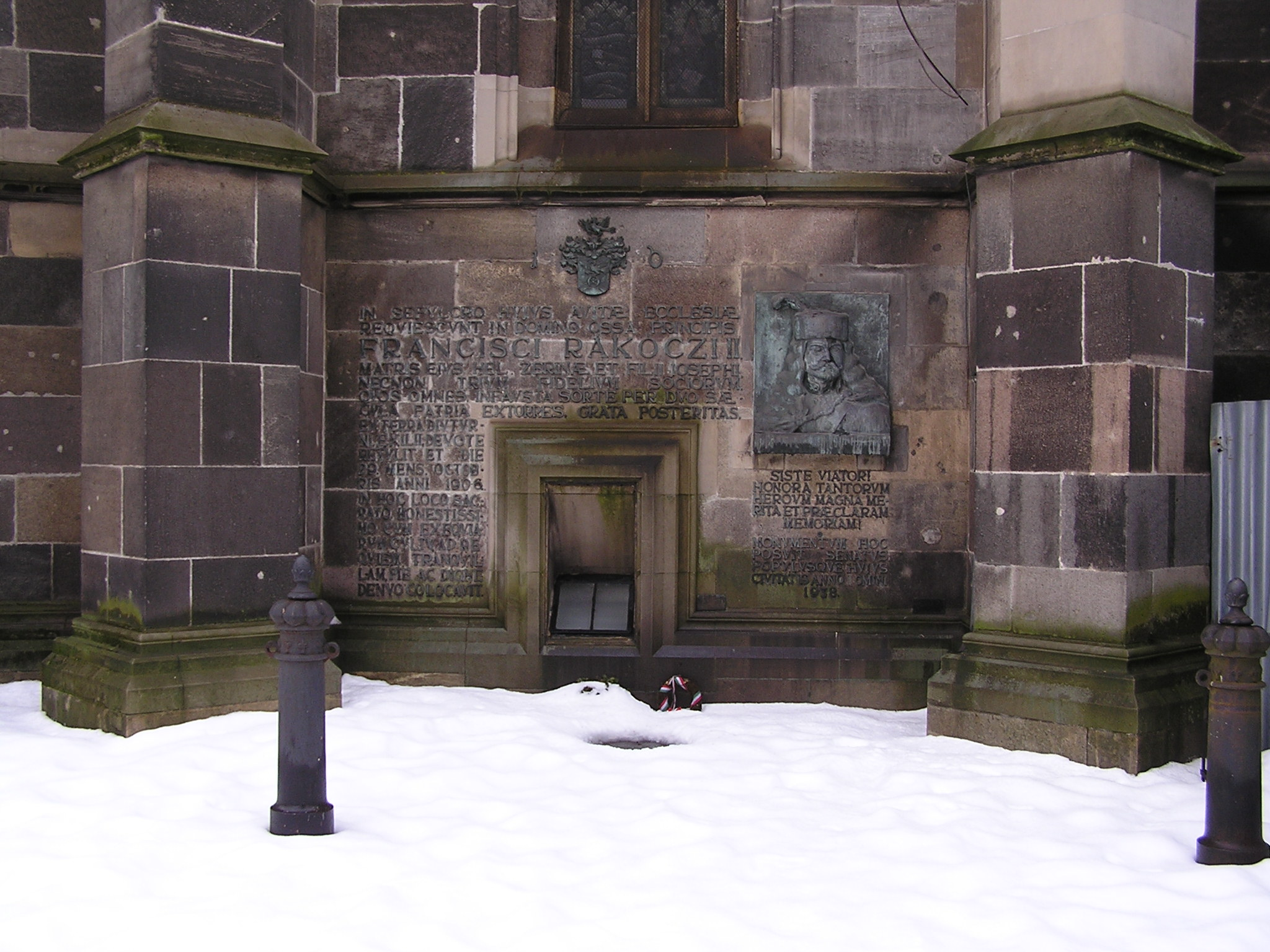
The memorial plate of Francis II embedded in the northern wall of the St. Elisabeth Cathedral in Košice, Slovakia

Zrínyi's second husband, Imre Thököly, took little interest in Rákóczi's education, as he was by then heavily involved in politics. However, the failure of the Turks to capture the Habsburg capital in the Battle of Vienna in 1683 frustrated Thököly's plans to become King of Upper Hungary. When the Turks began to grow suspicious of his intentions, Thököly proposed sending the young Rákóczi to Constantinople as a guarantee of his goodwill. But Rákóczi's mother opposed this plan, not wishing to be separated from her son.

In 1686 Antonio Carafa besieged their residence, the castle of Munkács. Zrínyi successfully led the defence of the castle for three years, but capitulated in 1688. The two Rákóczi children fell again under the guardianship of Leopold I, and moved to Vienna with their mother. They regained their possessions, but could not leave the city without the Emperor's permission.

At the age of 17, the Emperor emancipated Rákóczi from his mother, thereby allowing him to own property. His sister Julianna had interceded for him after marrying a powerful Austrian, General Aspremont. Rákóczi lived with the Aspremonts until his marriage in September 1694, to 15-year-old Princess Charlotte Amalie of Hesse-Wanfried, daughter of Charles, Landgrave of Hesse-Wanfried and a descendant of Saint Elizabeth of Hungary. The couple moved to the Rákóczi castle at Sárospatak, where Rákóczi began to manage his properties.

The Treaty of Karlowitz on 26 January 1699, forced Thököly and Zrínyi into exile. Rákóczi remained in Vienna under the Emperor's supervision. Relying on the prevalent anti-Habsburg sentiment, remnants of Thököly's peasant army started a new uprising in the Hegyalja region of Northeastern present-day Hungary, which was part of the property of the Rákóczi family. They captured the castles of Tokaj, Sárospatak and Sátoraljaújhely, and asked Rákóczi to become their leader, but he was not eager to head what appeared to be a minor peasant rebellion. He quickly returned to Vienna, where he tried his best to clear his name.

Rákóczi then befriended Count Miklós Bercsényi, whose property at Ungvár (today Ужгород (Uzhhorod), in Ukraine), lay next to his own. Bercsényi was a highly educated man, the third richest man in the kingdom (after Rákóczi and Simon Forgách), and was related to most of the Hungarian aristocracy.

== Rákóczi uprising ==
As the House of Habsburg was on the verge of dying out in Spain, France was looking for allies in its fight against Austrian hegemony. Consequently, they established contact with Rákóczi and promised support if he took up the cause of Hungarian independence. An Austrian spy seized this correspondence and brought it to the attention of the Emperor. As a direct result of this, Rákóczi was arrested on 18 April 1700, and imprisoned in the fortress of Wiener Neustadt (south of Vienna). It became obvious during the preliminary hearings that, just as in the case of his grandfather Péter Zrínyi, the only possible sentence for Ferenc was death. With the aid of his pregnant wife Amelia and the prison commander, Rákóczi managed to escape and flee to Poland. Here he met with Bercsényi again, and together they resumed contact with the French court. Three years later, the War of the Spanish Succession caused a large part of the Austrian forces in the Kingdom of Hungary to temporarily leave the country. Taking advantage of the situation, Kuruc forces began a new uprising in Munkács, and Rákóczi was asked to head it. He decided to invest his energies in a war of national liberation, and accepted the request. On 15 June 1703, another group of about 3000 armed men headed by Tamás Esze joined him near the Polish city of Ławoczne. Bercsényi arrived too, with French funds and 600 Polish mercenaries.

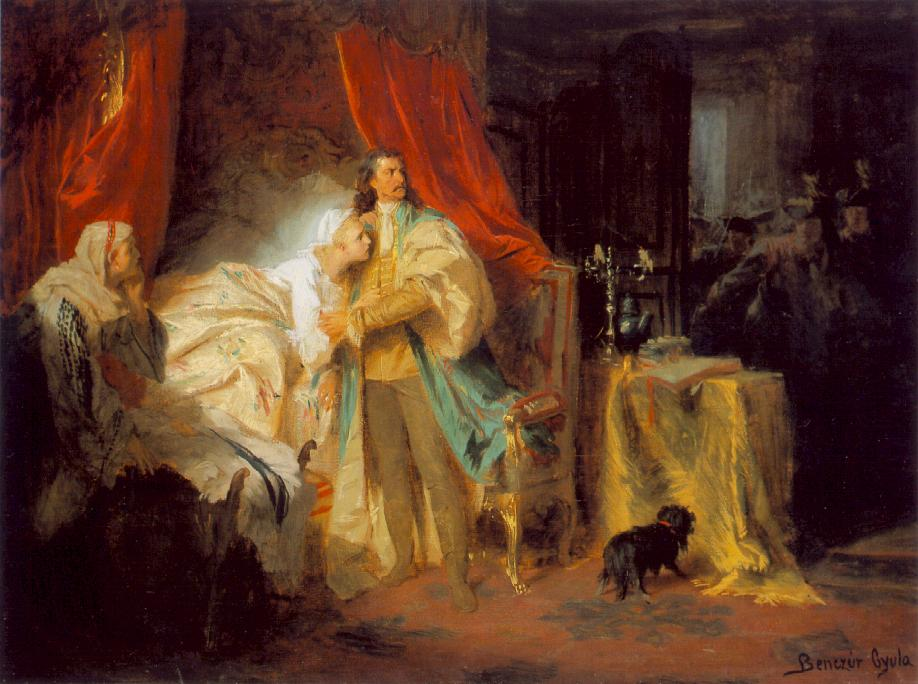
Gyula Benczúr (1844–1920): Capture of Francis II. Rákóczi in Nagysáros Castle (1869)

Most of the Hungarian nobility did not support Rákóczi's uprising, because they considered it to be no more than a peasant rebellion. Rákóczi's famous call to the nobility of Szabolcs County seemed to be in vain. He did manage to convince the Hajduk (Hungarian soldiers) (emancipated peasant warriors) to join his forces, so his forces controlled most of Kingdom of Hungary to the east and north of the Danube by late September 1703. He continued by conquering Transdanubia soon after. Since the Austrians had to fight Rákóczi on several fronts, they felt obliged to enter negotiations with him. However, the victory of Austrian and British forces against a combined French-Bavarian army in the Battle of Blenheim on 13 August 1704, provided an advantage not only in the War of the Spanish Succession, but also prevented the union of Rákóczi's forces with their French-Bavarian allies.

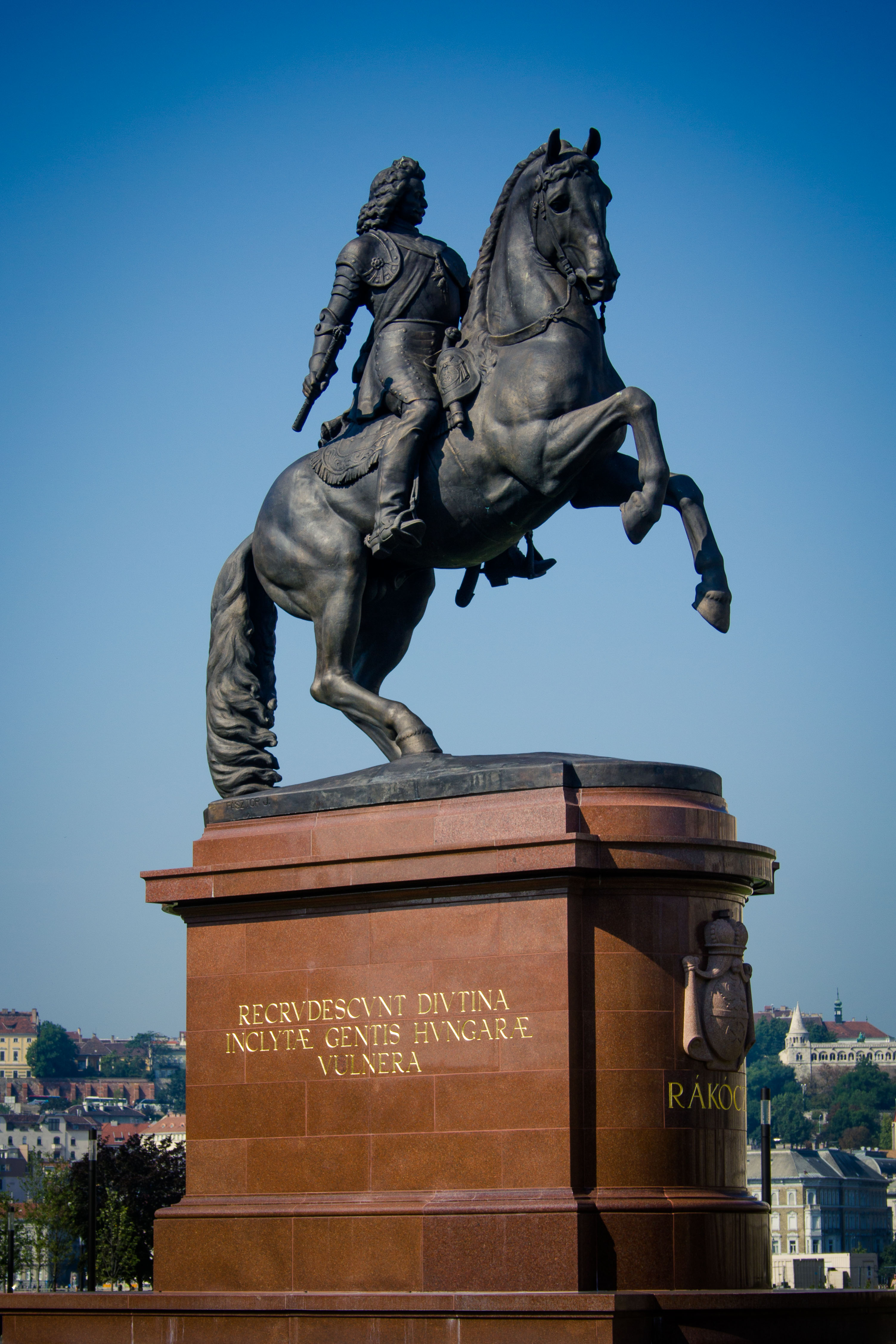
Statue of Francis II situated outside Hungarian Parliament Building

This placed Rákóczi into a difficult military and financial situation. French support gradually diminished, and a larger army was needed to occupy the already-won land. Meanwhile, supplying the current army with arms and food was beyond his means. He tried to solve this problem by creating a new copper-based coinage, which was not easily accepted in Hungary as people were used to silver coins. Nevertheless, Rákóczi managed to maintain his military advantage for a while – but after 1706, his army was forced into retreat.

A meeting of the Hungarian Diet (consisting of 6 bishops, 36 aristocrats and about 1000 representatives of the lower nobility of 25 counties), held near Szécsény (Nógrád County) in September 1705, elected Rákóczi to be the "vezérlő fejedelem" – (ruling) prince – of the Confederated Estates of the Kingdom of Hungary, to be assisted by a 24-member Senate. Rákóczi and the Senate were assigned joint responsibility for the conduct of foreign affairs, including peace talks.

Encouraged by England and the Netherlands, peace talks started again on 27 October 1705 between the Hungarians and the Emperor. Both sides varied their strategy according to the military situation. One stumbling block was the sovereignty over Transylvania – neither side was prepared to give it up. Rákóczi's proposed treaty with the French was stalled, so he became convinced that only a declaration of independence would make it acceptable for various powers to negotiate with him. In 1706, his wife (whom he had not seen in 5 years, along with their sons József and György) and his sister were both sent as peace ambassadors, but Rákóczi rejected their efforts on behalf of the Emperor.

In 1707 during the Great Northern War he was one of the candidates to the throne of Poland, supported by Elżbieta Sieniawska.

On Rákóczi's recommendation, and with Bercsényi's support, another meeting of the Diet held at Ónod (Borsod county) declared the deposition of the House of Habsburg from the Hungarian throne on 13 June 1707. But neither this act, nor the copper currency issued to avoid monetary inflation, were successful. Louis XIV refused to enter into treaties with Prince Rákóczi, leaving the Hungarians without allies. There remained the possibility of an alliance with Imperial Russia, but this did not materialize either.

At the Battle of Trencsén (German: Trentschin, Latin: Trentsinium, Comitatus Trentsiniensis, today Trenčín in Slovakia), on 3 August 1708 Rákóczi's horse stumbled, and he fell to the ground, which knocked him unconscious. The Kuruc forces thought him dead and fled. This defeat was fatal for the uprising. Numerous Kuruc leaders transferred their allegiance to the Emperor, hoping for clemency. Rákóczi's forces became restricted to the area around Munkács and Szabolcs County. Not trusting the word of János Pálffy, who was the Emperor's envoy charged with negotiations with the rebels, the Prince left the Kingdom of Hungary for Poland on 21 February 1711.

== Peace agreement ==
In Rákóczi's absence, Sándor Károlyi was named Commander-in-Chief of the Hungarian forces, and quickly negotiated a peace agreement with János Pálffy. Under its provisions, 12,000 rebels laid down their arms, handed over their flags and took an oath of allegiance to the Emperor on 1 May 1711 in the fields outside Majtény, in Szatmár county.

The Peace of Szatmár did not treat Rákóczi particularly badly. He was assured clemency if he took an oath of allegiance to the Emperor, as well as the freedom to move to Poland if he wanted to leave the Kingdom of Hungary. He did not accept these conditions, doubting the honesty of the Habsburg court, and he did not even recognize the legality of the Peace Treaty, as it had been signed after the death of the Emperor Joseph I on 17 April 1711, which terminated the plenipotential authority of János Pálffy. Subsequently, his Hungarian properties, Munkács and its castle, Szentmiklós (today Palanok Castle, Mukacheve and Chynadiyovo, Ukraine) and 200 villages were confiscated (and, in 1726, given by Charles VI, Holy Roman Emperor to Elector-Archbishop Lothar Franz von Schönborn who had helped to defeat Rákóczi).

== Exile ==
Rákóczi was offered the Polish Crown twice, supported by Tsar Peter I of Russia. He turned the offers down, though, and remained in Poland until 1712, where he was the honored guest of the Polish aristocracy. For a while he lived in Gdańsk under the pseudonym of Count of Sáros.

He left Gdańsk on 16 November 1712, and went to England, where Queen Anne, pressured by the Habsburgs, refused to receive him. Rákóczi then crossed the Channel to France, landing in Dieppe on 13 January 1713. On 27 April he handed a memorandum to Louis XIV reminding him of his past services to France and asking him not to forget Hungary during the coming peace negotiations for the War of the Spanish Succession. But neither the Treaty of Utrecht in 1713 nor the Treaty of Rastatt in 1714 made any mention of Hungary or Rákóczi. No provisions were even made to allow Rákóczi's two sons, who were kept under surveillance in Vienna, to rejoin their father.

Prince Rákóczi, although not recognized officially by France, was much in favour in the French court. But after the death of Louis XIV on 1 September 1715, he decided to accept the invitation of the Ottoman Empire (still at war with the Habsburgs) to move there. He left France in September 1717 with an entourage of 40 people and landed at Gallipoli on 10 October 1717. He was received with honors, but his desire to head up a separate Christian army to help in the fight against the Habsburgs was not under serious consideration.

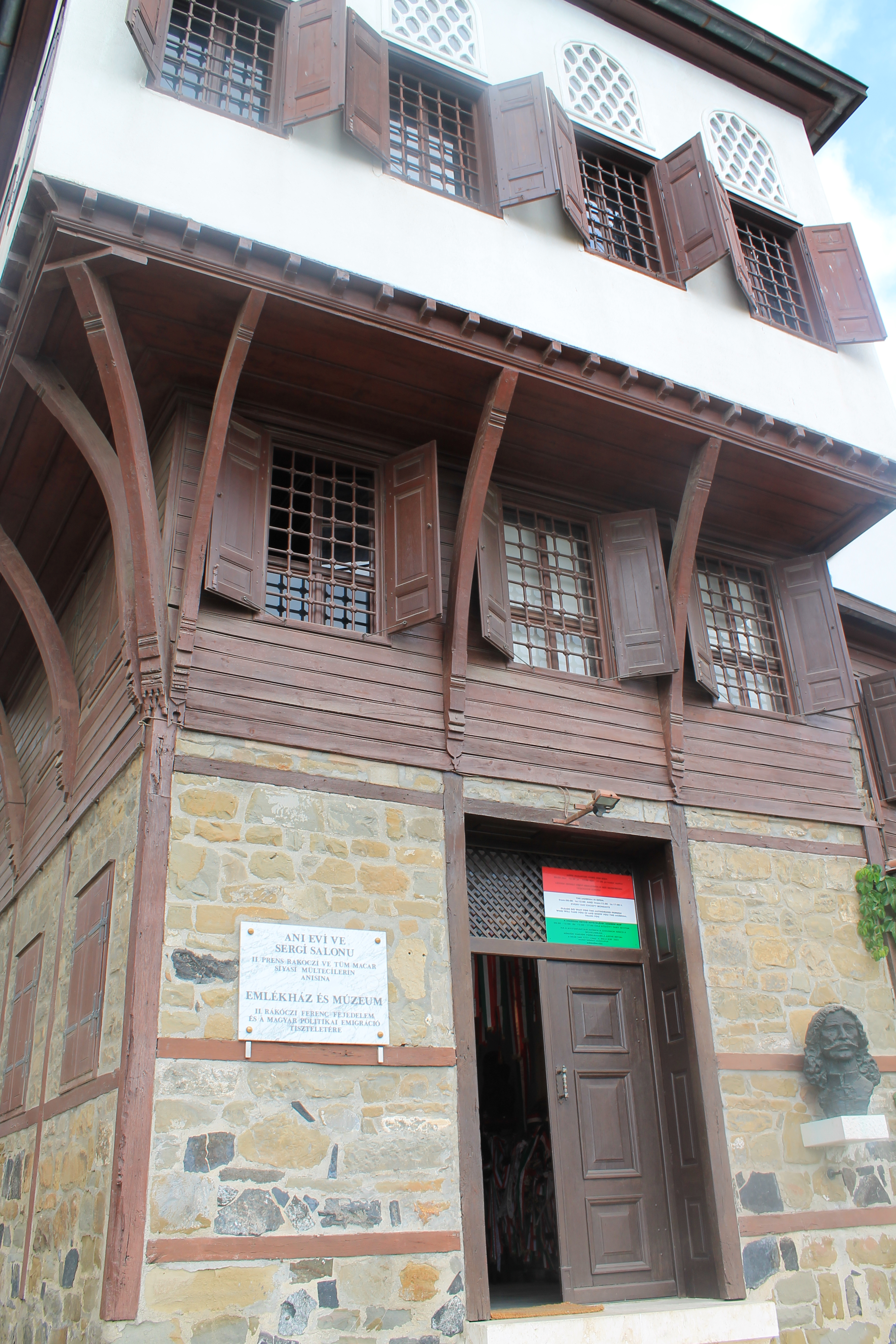
The memorial house of Francis II in Tekirdağ

The Ottoman Empire signed the Peace Treaty of Passarowitz with Austria on 21 July 1718. Among its provisions was the refusal of the Turks to extradite the exiled Hungarians. Two years later, the Austrian envoy requested that the exiles be turned over, but the Sultan refused as a matter of honor. Rákóczi and his entourage were settled in the town of Tekirdağ (Rodostó in Hungarian), relatively distant from the Ottoman capital, and a large Hungarian colony grew up around this town on the Sea of Marmara. Bercsényi, Count Simon Forgách, Count Antal Esterházy, Count Mihály Csáky, Miklós Sibrik, Zsigmond Zay, the two Pápays, and Colonel Ádám Jávorka were among many who settled there, sharing the sentiment of the writer Kelemen Mikes, who said, "I had no special reason to leave my country, except that I greatly loved the Prince."

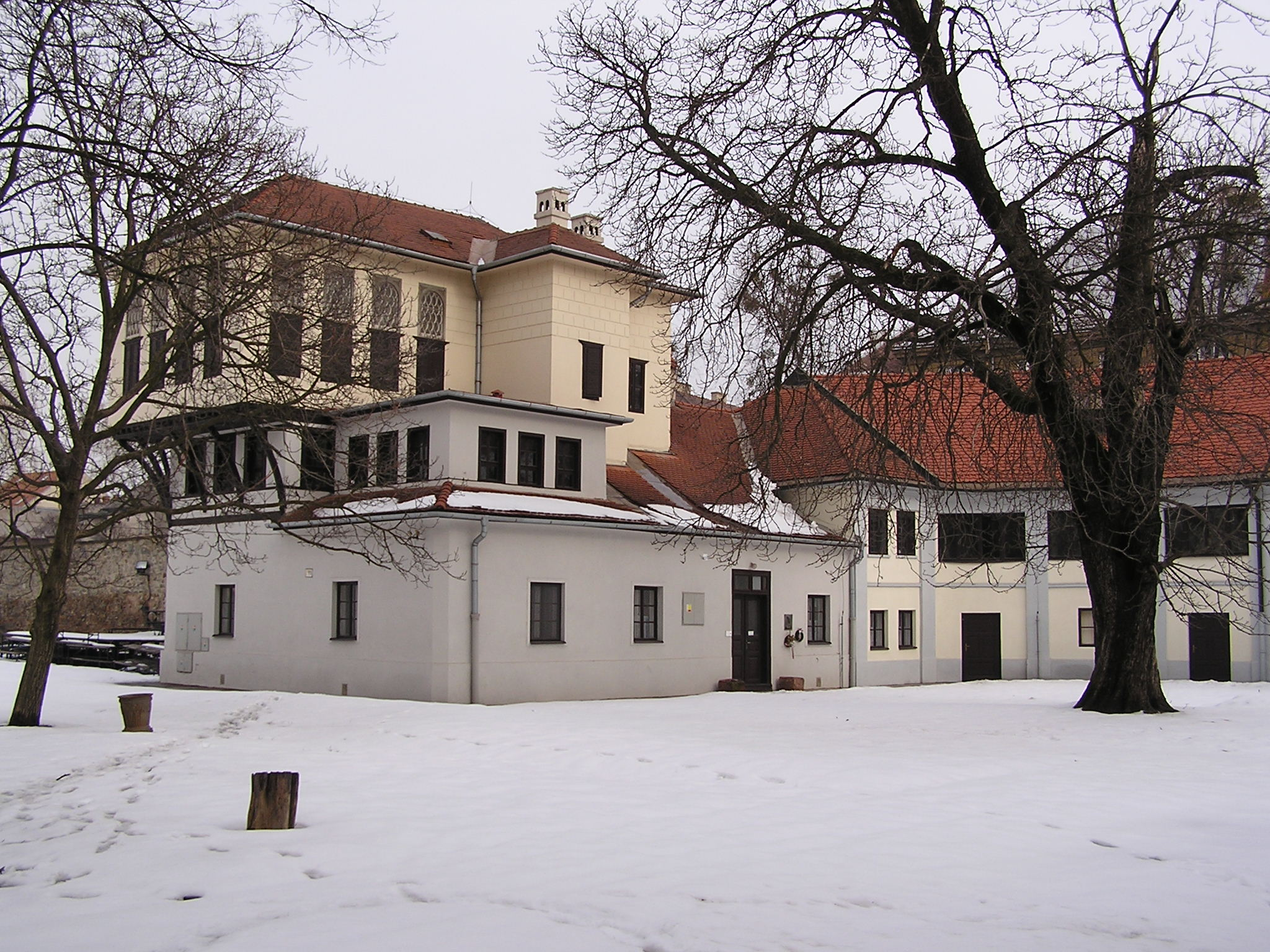
The memorial house of Francis II in Košice (a replica of his original house of Tekirdağ)

Rákóczi lived in Tekirdağ for 18 years. He adopted a set routine: rising early, attending daily Mass, writing and reading in the mornings, and carpentry in the afternoons; visited occasionally by his son, György Rákóczi. Further military troubles in 1733 in Poland awakened his hopes of a possible return to Hungary, but they were not fulfilled. Rákóczi was 59 years old when he died on 8 April 1735.

Rákóczi's last will, dated 27 October 1733, left something to all his family members as well as to his fellow exiles. He left separate letters to be sent to the Sultan and to France's Ambassador to Constantinople, asking them not to forget about his fellow exiles. His internal organs were buried in the Greek church of Rodosto, while his heart was sent to France. After obtaining the permission of the Turkish authorities, Rákóczi's body was taken by his faithful chamberlain Kelemen Mikes to Constantinople on 6 July 1735 for burial in Saint-Benoît (then Jesuit) French church in Galata, where he was buried, according to his last wishes, next to his mother Ilona Zrínyi.

His remains were moved on 29 October 1906 to the St. Elisabeth Cathedral in Kassa, Hungary (today Košice, Slovakia), where he is buried with his mother Ilona and his son.

== Personal life ==
In 1694, at the age of eighteen, Rákóczi became of age, three years earlier than usual. After finishing his university studies the same year, and advised so by his brother-in-law Ferdinand Gobert von Aspremont-Lynden, the young Rákóczi decided to marry without seeking the prior approval of Leopold I, Holy Roman Emperor. He was the last descendant of the Rákóczi family, he had to live in Hungary to win back the old supporters of his family and so he had to marry as soon as possible. On 26 September 1694 in Cologne, he married the fifteen-year-old Landgravine Charlotte Amalie of Hesse-Wanfried, member of the Hesse-Wanfried branch of the House of Hesse, eldest daughter of Charles, Landgrave of Hesse-Wanfried by his second wife, Countess Alexandrine Juliane of Leiningen-Dagsburg (1651-1703). His wife's Catholic religion was an important factor in choosing her, as much as her beauty, but even more significant was her network of connections. Charlotte Amalie's pro-French German princely house was connected to many notable relatives, like Elisabeth of Hungary from the Árpád dynasty, Louis XIV, and the wives of Prince Philippe, Duke of Orléans and Leopold I, Holy Roman Emperor among others. Rákóczi and Charlotte Amalie had three sons together and his wife also gave birth to a daughter:

- Lipót Lajos György Rákóczi (1696-1699)
- József Rákóczi, Duke of Munkács (1700-1738), never married but had an illegitimate daughter:
  - Maria Elisabeta (1736-1786), a nun (Sister Josephine Charlotte), lived and died in Paris, France
- György Rákóczi, Duke of Makovica (1701-1752), married firstly Marquise de Béthune and had one son; married secondly Marguerite Suzanne Pinthereau de Bois I’Isle (1702-1768).
  - György Rákóczi(1740-1743)
- Sarolta Rákóczi (1706-1706), who only lived a couple of weeks; this child was probably not fathered by Rákóczi who hadn't seen his family for five years at this point.

== Works ==
- Confession d'un pécheur, translated from Latin by Chrysostome Jourdain. Critical edition produced under the direction of Gábor Tüskés. Foreword by Jean Garapon, studies by Ferenc Tóth, Gábor Tüskés, Ildikó Gausz, Csenge E. Aradi and Zsuzsanna Hámori-Nagy. Prepared and reviewed by Michel Marty. Paris, Honoré Champion, 2020.
- Mémoires du prince François II Rákóczi sur la guerre de Hongrie depuis 1703 jusqu'a sa fin, translated by István Vas. Afterword and commentary by Béla Köpeczi; text established and critical apparatus by Ilona Kovács. Budapest, Akadémiai, 1978. (Archivum Rákóczianum)
- Testament politique et moral du prince François II Rákóczi, translated by Nándor Szávai and Ilona Kovács. Study and commentary by Béla Köpeczi; Latin text by István Borzsák; French texts and critical apparatus by Ilona Kovács. Budapest, Akadémiai, 1984. (Archivum Rákóczianum)
- Méditations du prince François II Rákóczi, Latin text established and annotated by Balázs Déri; French text established and annotated by Ilona Kovács; with a study and summaries by Gábor Tüskés. Budapest: Balassi, 1997. (Archivum Rákóczianum)
- Aspirations du prince François II Rákóczi, Latin text edited and annotated by Balázs Déri; French text edited and annotated by Ilona Kovács; translated by Gáspár Csóka and Balázs Déri; notes by Lajos Hopp. Budapest, Akadémiai, Balassi, 1994. (Archivum Rákóczianum)
- Ferenc Rákóczi II: Confessio Peccatoris. The confession of a sinner, translated by Bernard Adams, preface by Robert Evans, essay by Gábor Tüskés. Budapest, Corvina, 2019.
- Ferenc Rákóczi II: Memoirs, translated by Bernard Adams, essay by Gábor Tüskés. Budapest, Corvina, 2019.
- Correspondance de François II Rákóczi et de la Palatine Elżbieta Sieniawska 1704-1727, publ. with collaboration of Gábor Tüskés by Ilona Kovács and Béla Köpeczi, Budapest, Balassi Kiadó, 2004.

== Timeline ==
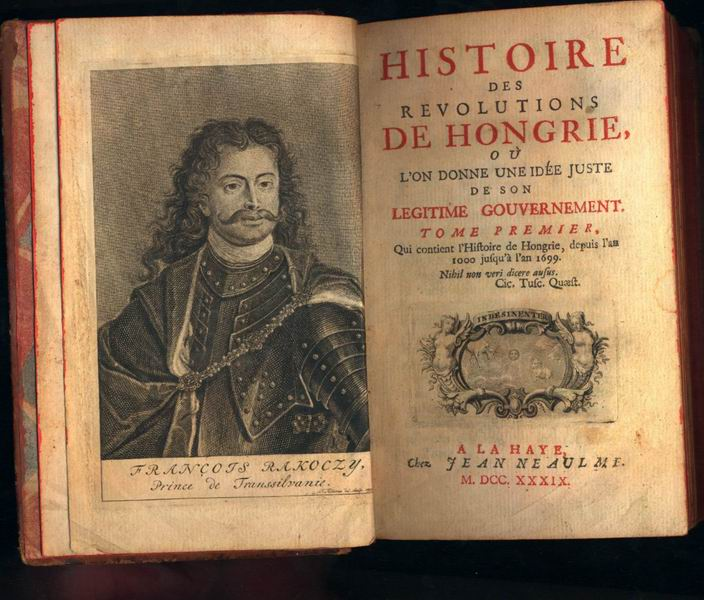
Histoire des Révolutions de Hongrie, The Hague, by Jean Neaulme, 1739

- Early life
  - 27 March 1676 – Rákóczi is born.
  - 26 January 1699 – Treaty of Karlowitz forces Emmeric Thököly and Ilona Zrínyi into exile.
  - 11 February 1701 – Negotiations begin with Louis XIV concerning the Hungarian struggle for independence.
  - February, 1701 – Correspondence is seized by an Austrian spy. Rákóczi is jailed, but escapes being sentenced to death.
- The War of Independence
  - 15 June 1703 – Rákóczi meets Tamás Esze and his army on the Hungarian border.
  - 26 September 1703 – Large portions of Hungary are under Rákóczi's control.
  - 13 August 1704 – The Habsburgs (with British help) defeat the combined French-Bavarian army, thus depriving Rákóczi of an important ally.
  - 15 May 1705 – Death of Emperor Leopold I, accession of Joseph I to the throne.
  - 20 September 1705 – The Diet of Szécsény proclaims Rákóczi as the ruling Prince and establishes a governing structure for the country.
  - 27 October 1705 – Peace negotiations begin.
  - 13 June 1707 – The Diet of Ónod deposes the House of Habsburg from the Hungarian throne.
- End of the war, peace treaty
  - 3 August 1708 – Kuruc defeated at the Battle of Trencsén.
  - 22 January 1710 – Battle of Romhány, one of the last battles of the war (a Kuruc loss, or a draw).
  - 21 February 1711 – Rákóczi goes into exile.
  - 1 May 1711 – Hungarian forces surrender near Szatmár.
- Exile
  - 13 January 1713 – Rákóczi arrives in Dieppe, France.
  - 10 October 1717 – Rákóczi arrives in Turkey.
  - 8 April 1735 – Dies in Tekirdağ.

== Memory ==
Francis II is remembered a Hungarian national hero, and is honored in various ways by modern Hungarians.

=== Memorials ===
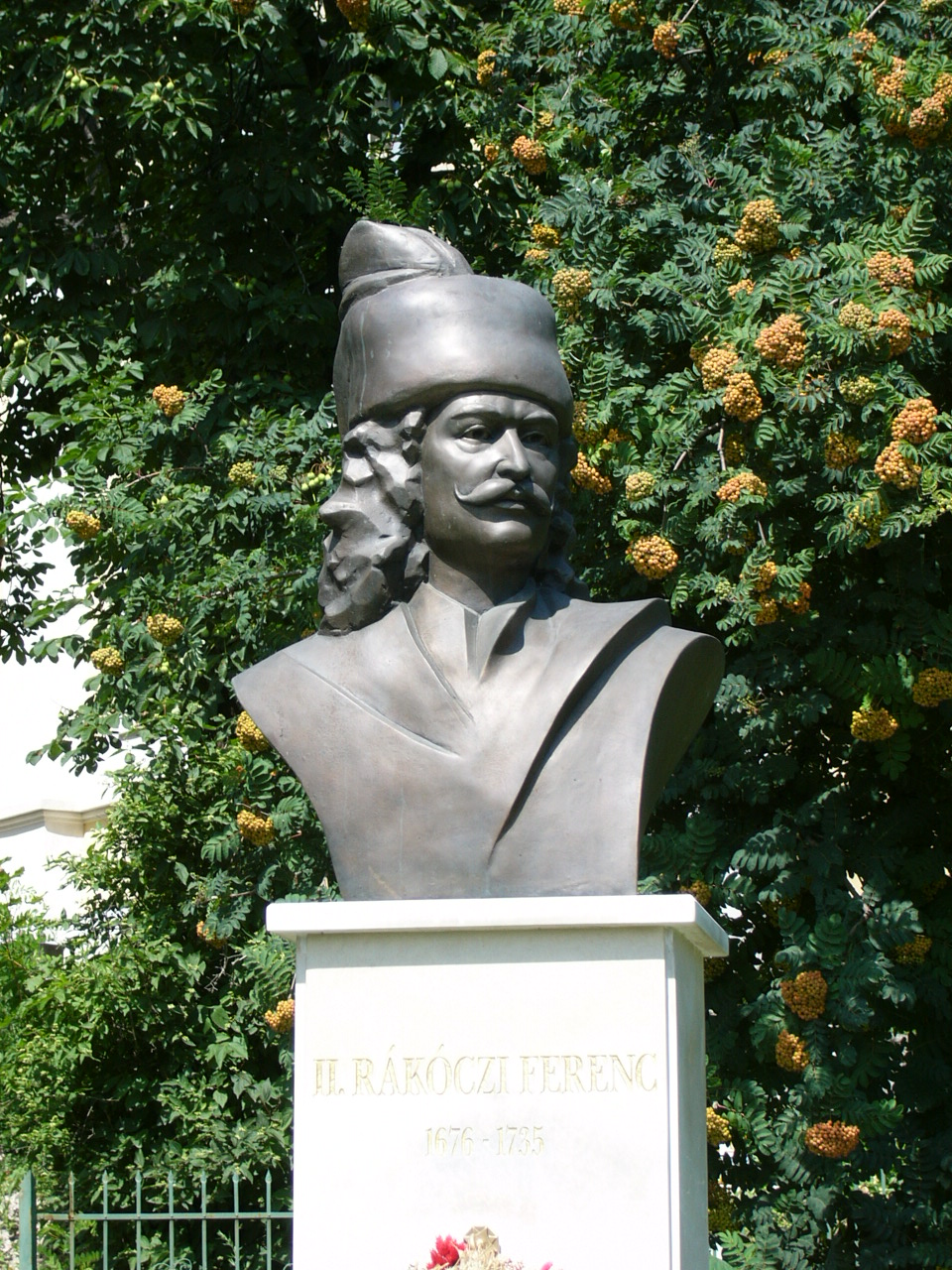
Statue of Rákóczi in Miskolc

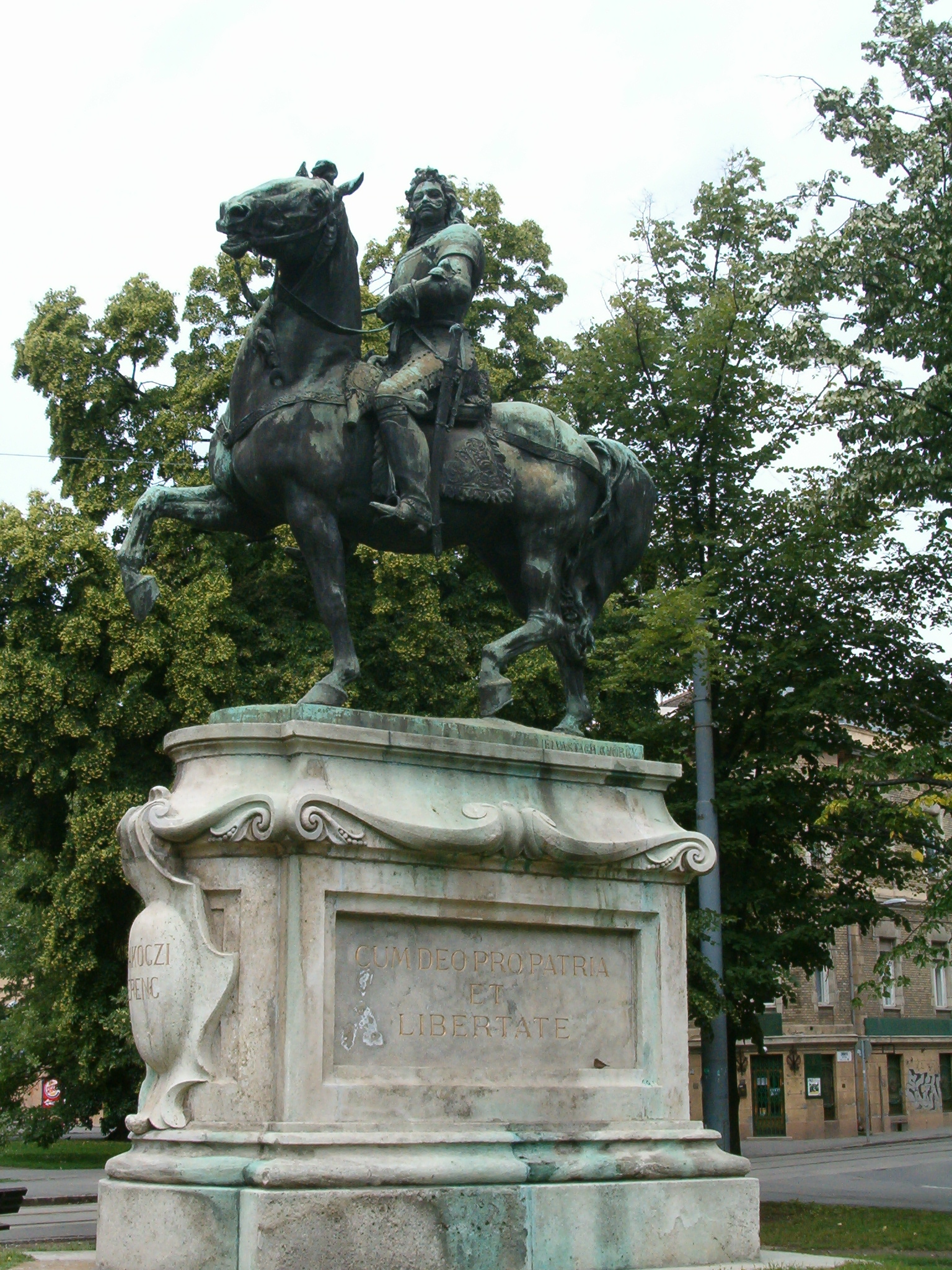
Statue in Szeged

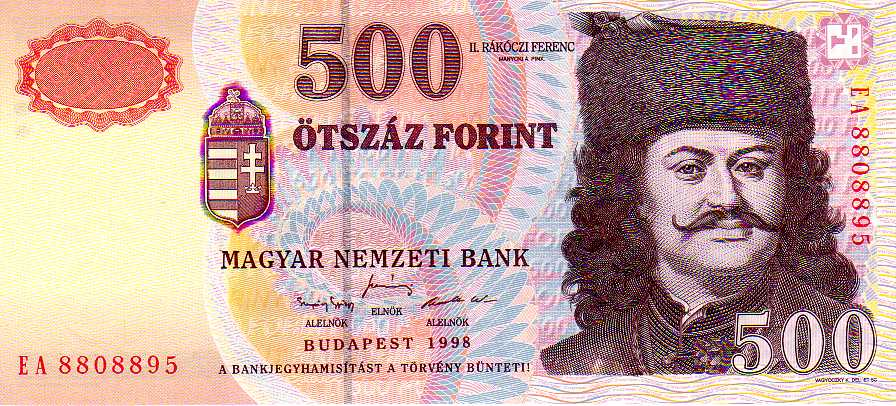
Rákóczi on the 500 Ft banknote

His equestrian statue with the famous motto Cum Deo Pro Patria et Libertate ("With God for Fatherland and Liberty") written on its red marble base was erected in front of the Hungarian Parliament Building on Lajos Kossuth Square in 1937, the work of János Pásztor. In the 1950s, the first two words, Cum Deo (i.e., "With God"), were removed for ideological reasons; in 1989, they were restored.

When, after 1945, the great Millennium Monument on Heroes' Square was purged of statues of the Habsburg kings of Hungary, the best Hungarian sculptor of the period, Zsigmond Kisfaludi Strobl, made a new statue of Rákóczi instead of King Lipót II. It was erected in 1953 together with a relief on the base depicting the meeting of Rákóczy and Tamás Esze.

=== Places and institutions ===
There are 11 Rákóczi streets and 3 Rákóczi squares in Budapest (see: Public place names of Budapest), including one of the most prominent avenues, named Rákóczi út ("Rákóczi Avenue"), forming the boundary between Districts VII and VIII. The street was named after him on 28 October 1906 when his remains were brought back to Hungary from Turkey and a long funeral march went along the street to the Eastern Railway Station. Rákóczi tér, 'Rákóczi Square', in District VIII, was also named after him in 1874. A bridge on the Danube at Budapest is named Rákóczi Bridge after him.

In Hungary two villages bear the name of Rákóczi. Rákóczifalva in Jász-Nagykun-Szolnok County was established in 1883 on the former estate of Rákóczi where the Prince had a hunting lodge. The neighbouring Rákócziújfalu became an independent village in 1950 (before that it was part of Rákóczifalva).

The village of Zavadka, today in Ukraine next to the Veretski Pass (Hungarian: Vereckei-hágó) where Rákóczi arrived at Hungary in the beginning of the uprising in 1703 and where he said goodbye to his followers in 1711 going into exile was renamed Rákócziszállás in 1889. The neighbouring village of Podpolóc (today Pidpolozzya) where Rákóczi spent a night in 1703 was renamed that year Vezérszállás. After 1918 the two villages got back their former names.

Mount Bovcar (today Bovtsars'kyy Verkh in present-day Ukraine) and the neighbouring Bovcar Spring was named by the local Rusyn people after Rákóczi who drank from the spring on 18 February 1711. Bovcar (Бовцар) means "the Tsar was here" in Rusyn language.

The library of Borsod-Abaúj-Zemplén county in Miskolc (II. Rákóczi Ferenc Megyei Könyvtár) is named after him.

The house in which he lived has been transformed into Rákóczi Museum, Tekirdağ, open to the visitors every day except Mondays.

=== Banknotes ===
Rákóczi's portrait can be found on Hungarian banknotes. Before it was withdrawn from circulation, it was on the 50-forint note. Since then it has been transferred to the 500-forint note.

=== Rákóczi March ===
A well-known patriotic tune of the 18th–19th centuries (composer unknown) is named after Rákóczi, as it was reputed to be his favourite, although actually it was composed only in the 1730s. Hector Berlioz orchestrated the piece, and it was also used by Franz Liszt as the basis of his Hungarian Rhapsody No.15. The Rákóczy March remains a popular piece of Hungarian state and military celebrations.

== See also ==
- Executioner's Bastion
- Rákóczi's sculpture in Košice
- Count of St. Germain theorized as son

== Bibliography ==
- Horváth, Réka, Agents in the News: English Envoys and Imperial Diplomats in the London Periodical Press during the Peace Negotiations of Rákóczi's War of Independence (1704–06), Journal of European Periodical Studies 9 : 2 (2025) pp. 77-90.
- Takács, László, Some Important Corrections in the Manuscript of Rákóczi's Confessio Peccatoris before and after Accusation of Jansenism, In: Tüskés, Gábor; Christoph Schmitt-Maaß; Michel Marty (Hrsg.), Jansenisms and Literature in Central Europe / Jansenismen und Literatur in Mitteleuropa / Jansénismes et littérature en Europe centrale, Bern, Berlin, Bruxelles, Peter Lang, 2023, pp. 495-504.
- Csatáry, György, Military supplies and the population at the beginning of the Rákóczi war of independence (1703–1704), Ukraine: Cultural Heritage National Identity Statehood 35 (2022) pp. 25-38.
- Csatáry, György, The Rákóczi war of independence (1703–1711) and its cult in Berehove, Transcarpathia (Ukraine), Ukraine: Cultural Heritage National Identity Statehood 34 (2021) pp. 13-27.
- Marki, Sandor: Nagy Péter czár és II. Rákóczi Ferencz szövetsége 1707-ben : székfoglaló értekezés [About Peter the Great and Ferenc Rákóczi negotiations in 1707]. 1913. https://archive.org/details/nagypterczr00mr/page/58/mode/2up
- Tüskés, Gábor, The Re-Evaluation of Ferenc Rákóczi II's Confessio peccatoris, Neulateinisches Jahrbuch – Journal of Neo-Latin Language and Literature 23 : 2021, pp. 279-289.
- Tüskés, Gábor, Ferenc Rákóczi II: Mémoires, In: Ferenc Rákóczi II, Memoirs, Budapest, Corvina, 2019, pp. 225-240.
- Tüskés, Gábor, Ferenc Rákóczi II and Confessio peccatoris, In: Ferenc Rákóczi II, Confessio peccatoris, Budapest, Corvina, 2019, pp. 367-387.
- Tóth, Ferenc, Emigré or Exile? Francis Rákóczi II and His Exile in France and Turkey, In: Philip, Mansel; Torsten, Riotte (ed.), Monarchy and Exile: The Politics of Legitimacy from Marie de Médicis to Wilhelm II, London, Palgrave Macmillan, 2011, pp. 91-102.
- Tóth, Ferenc (ed.), Europe and Hungary in the Age of Ferenc II Rákóczi, Budapest, Károli Gáspár Református Egyetem, 2006.
