= Rákóczi's sculpture in Košice =

Coordinates: 48.7228°N 21.2603°E

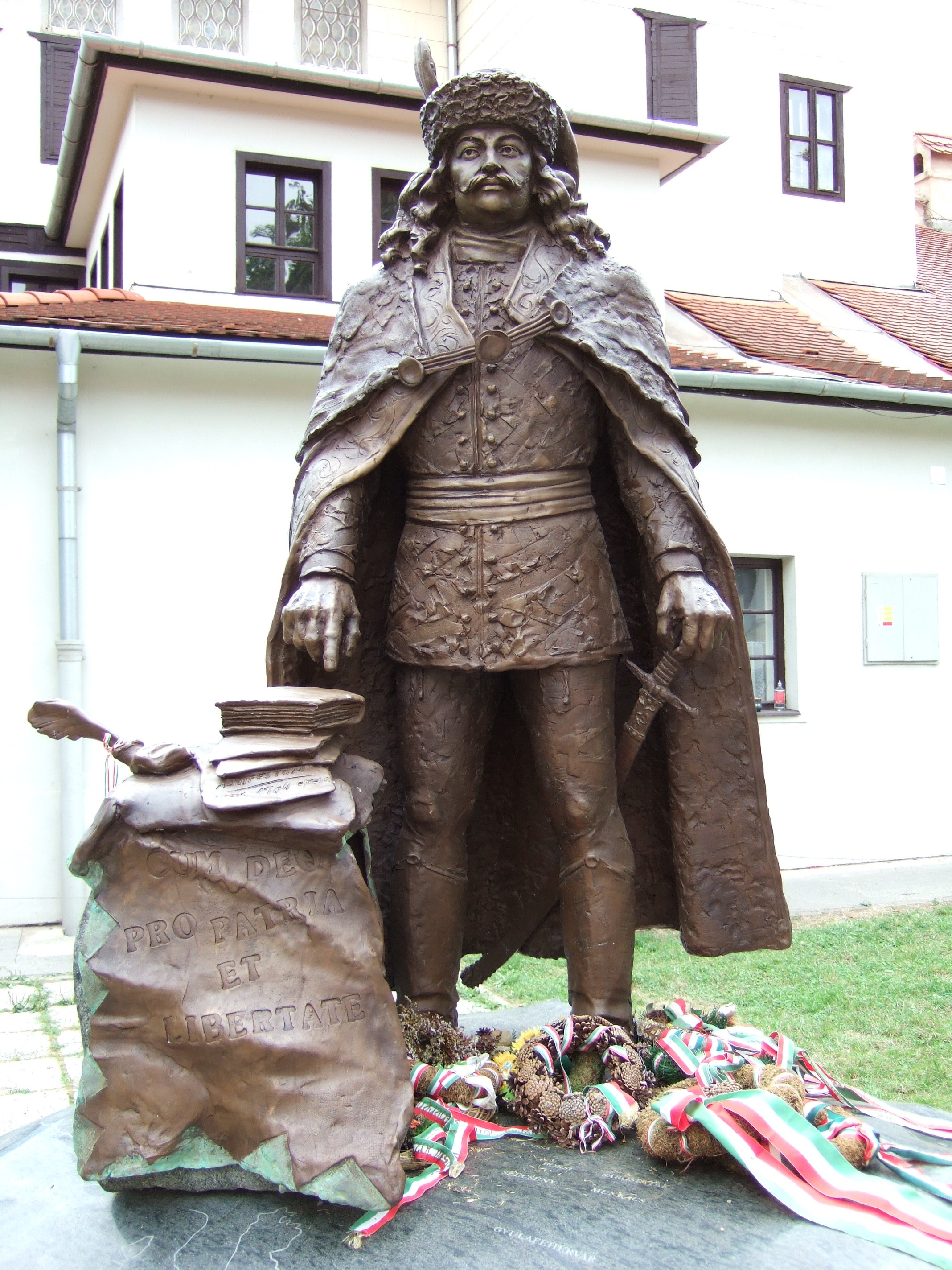
Sculpture of Francis II Rákóczi in Košice, Slovakia

The Rákóczi's sculpture in Košice is a bronze statue of Francis II Rákóczi, situated in the Executioner's Bastion in the historical centre of Košice, Slovakia. It is placed in front of Rákóczi's memorial house, a replica of his house in the Turkish exile in Rodosto.

The sculpture was unveiled on April 3, 2006 in memory of the 330th anniversary of Rákóczi's birth (March 27, 1676) and the 100th anniversary of his remains burial in Košice (remains of Francis II Rákóczi and his brothers-in-arms were buried in St. Elisabeth Cathedral on October 29, 1906). The sculpture was donated to the city of Košice by the Government of the Republic of Hungary.

Rákóczi's sculpture is 230 cm (7 ft 7 in) high and weighs 500 kg (1,100 lb). It is placed on a polished granite pedestal that weighs 8,000 kg (17,600 lb) and is 70 cm (28 in) high and 300 cm (118 in) wide.

The statue is an artwork of Hungarian sculptor Sándor Győrfi from Karcag.

== Gallery ==
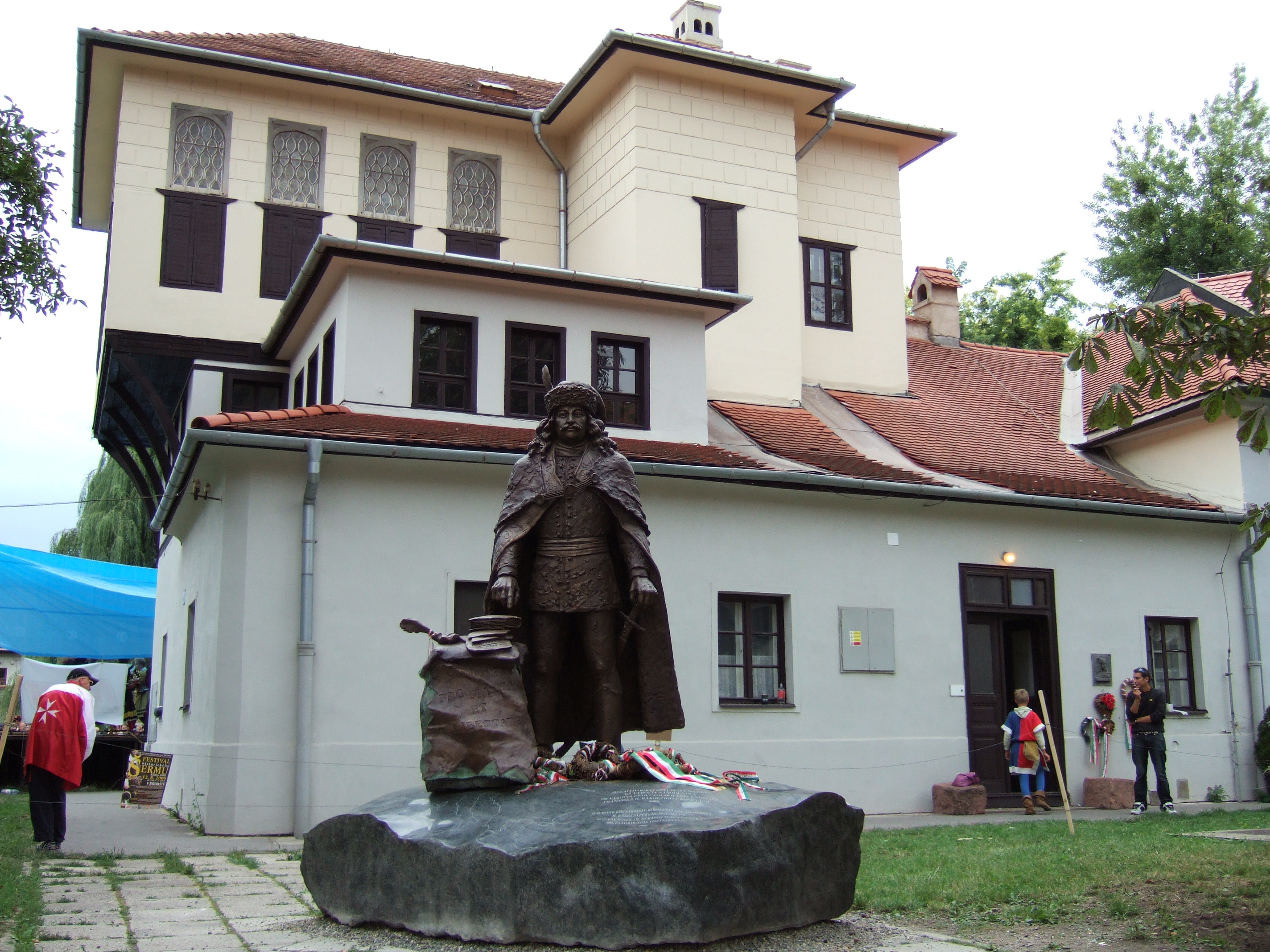
Memorial house
with a bronze sculpture of Francis II Rákóczi

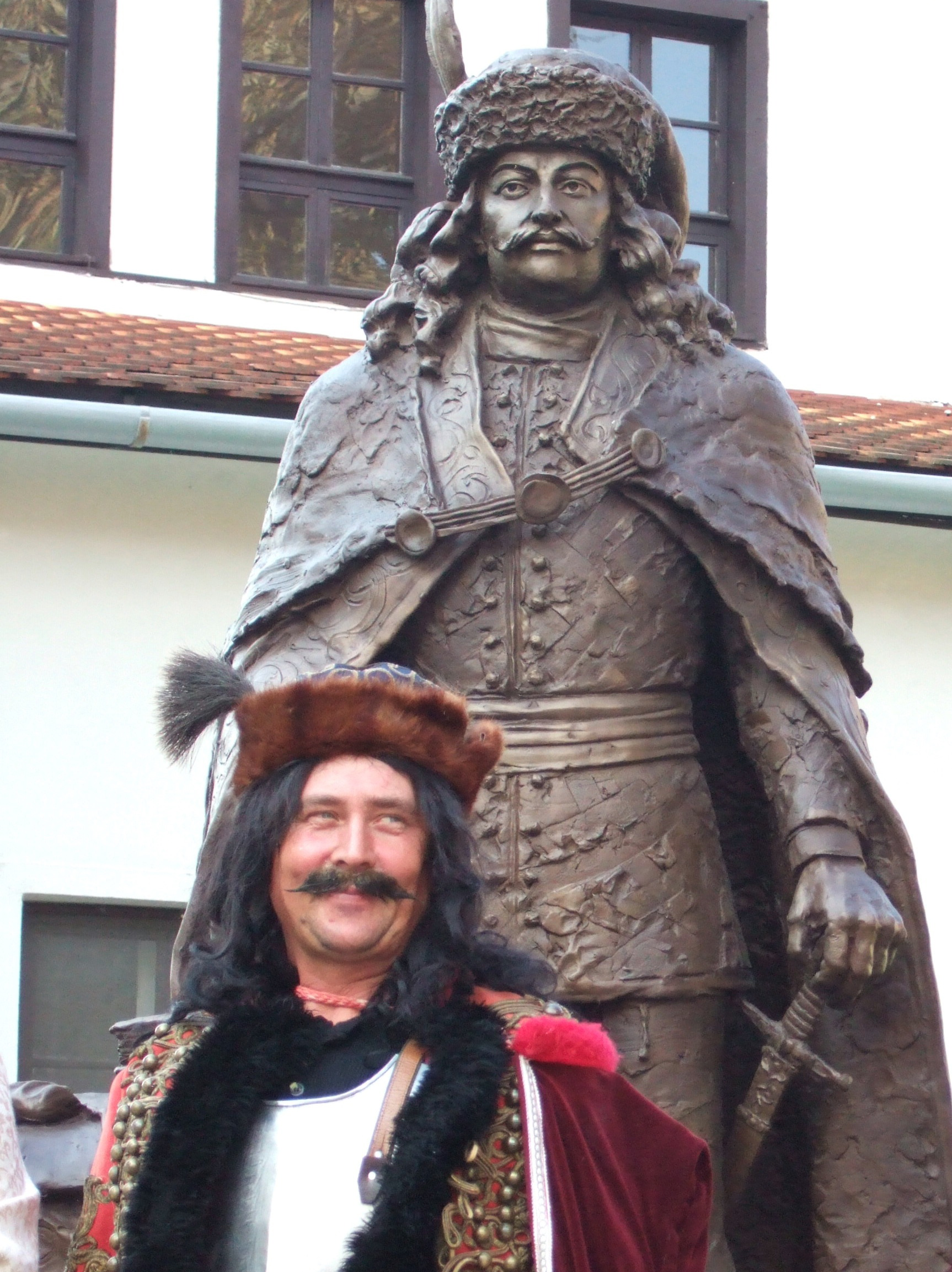
The sculpture and Rákóczi's body-double
