= Executioner's Bastion =

Bastion in Slovakia

Coordinates: 48°43′22.47″N 21°15′38.38″E

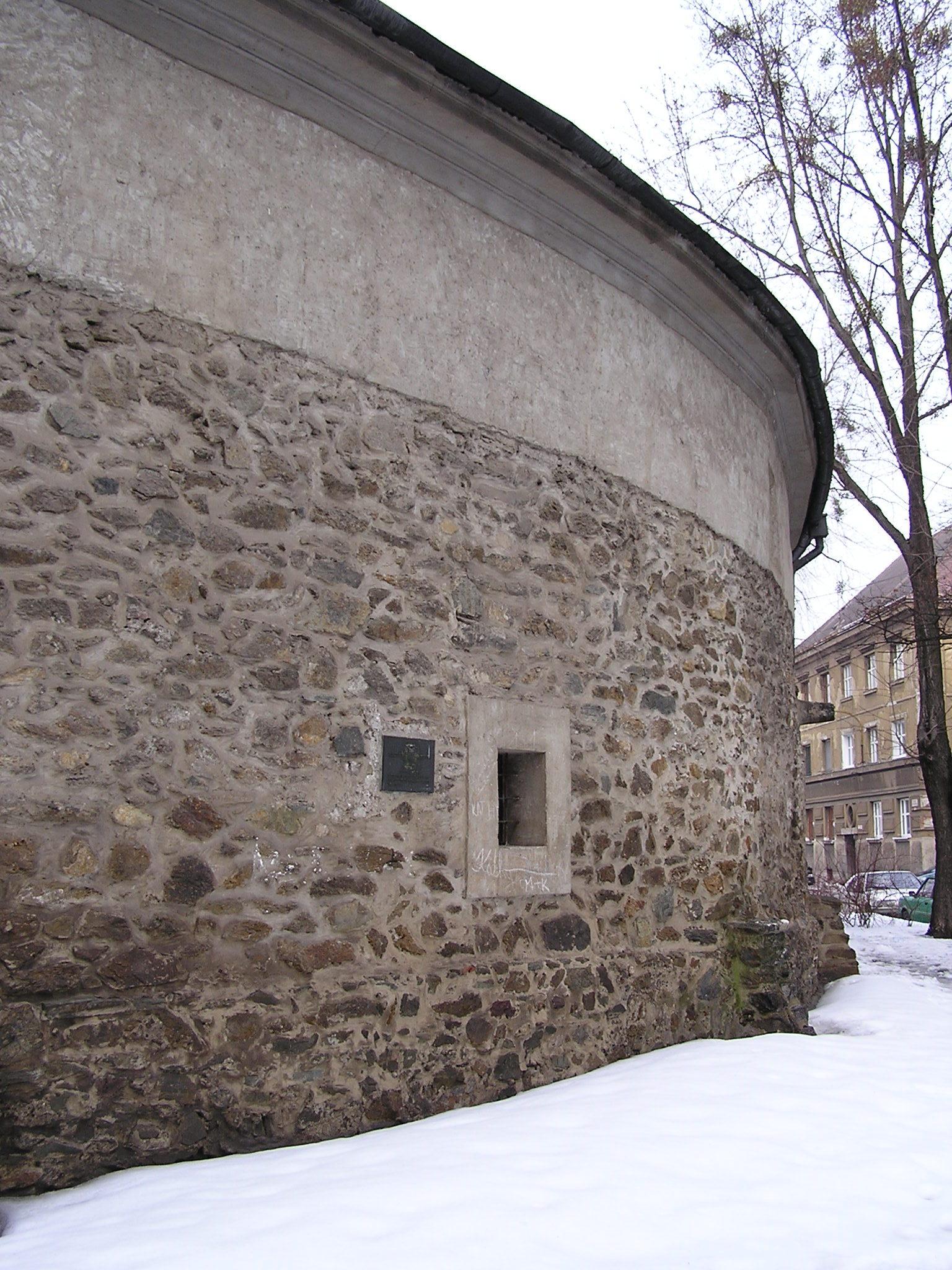
The Executioner's Bastion

The Executioner's Bastion is a bastion situated at Stará baštová Street in the historic center of Košice, Slovakia.

Its name is derived from the fact that the bastion was situated near a medieval executioner's house. It is semicircular building with eight cannon chambers erected around the year 1500, build for defense purposes. The bastion was converted in the years 1920–1930 to the needs of the East Slovak Museum.

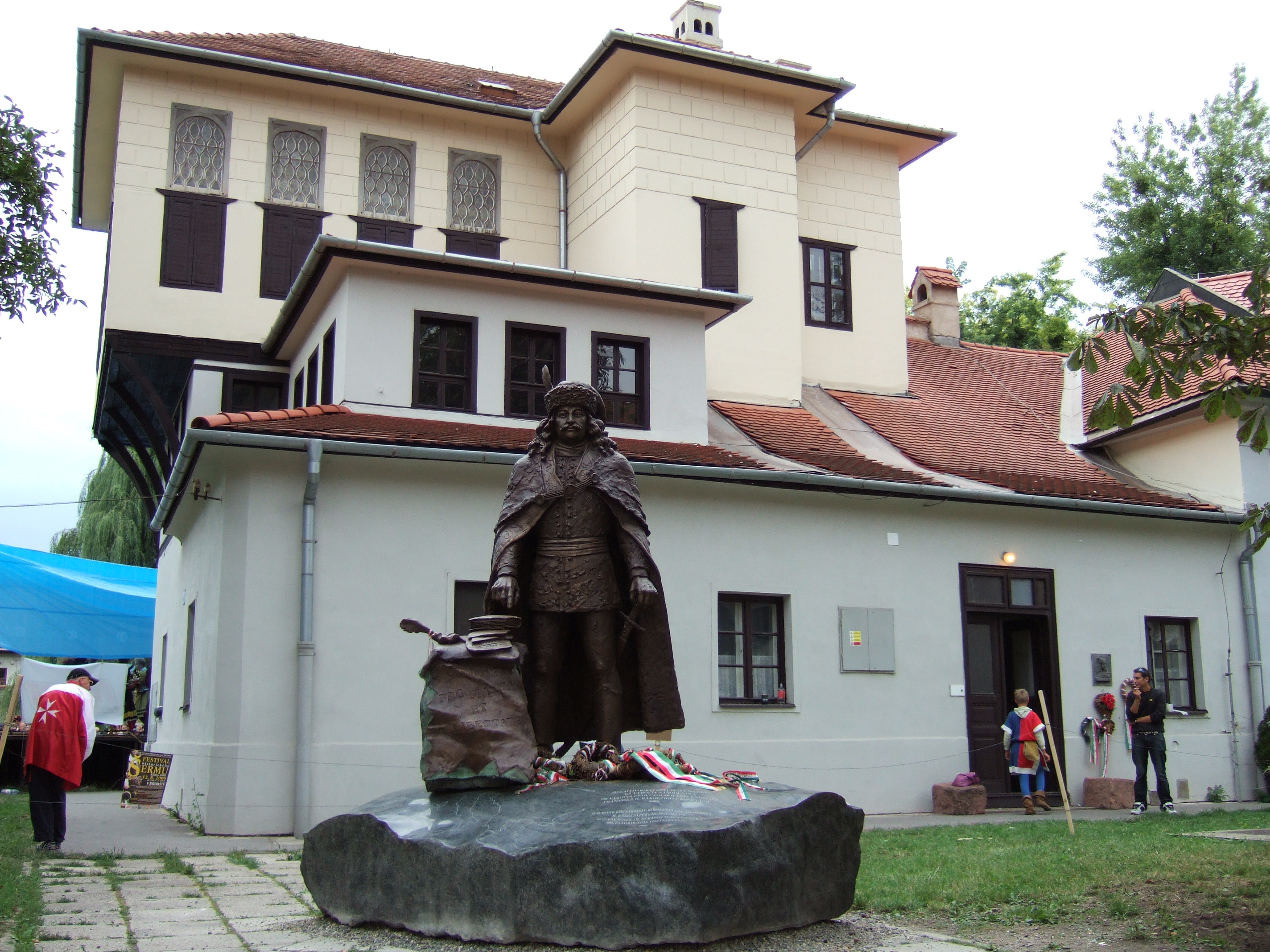
Memorial house with a sculpture of Francis II Rákóczi

The Memorial House of Francis II Rákóczi is a part of the Executioner's Bastion. It is a replica of his house in the Turkish exile in Tekirdağ. The exhibition in the memorial house presents relics reminding the life of the last leader of the anti-Habsburg uprising, the history of the replica of his house in Rodosto and the funeral of Rákóczi and his brothers-in-arms in Košice in 1906.

The bronze sculpture of Francis II Rákóczi was unveiled on April 3, 2006 in front of the house.
