= Charlotte Amalie of Hesse-Wanfried =

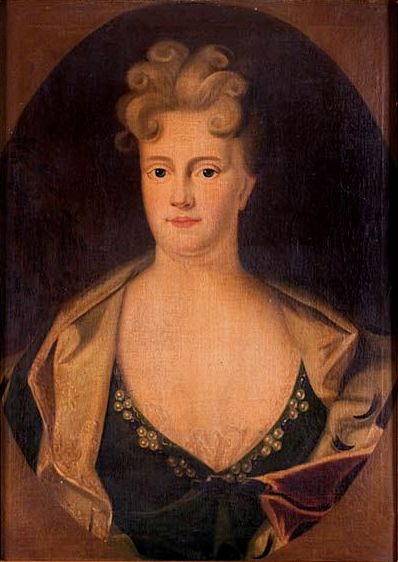
Portrait of Charlotte Amalie of Hesse-Wanfried, Princess Consort of Transylvania

Princess Charlotte Amalie of Hesse-Wanfried (8 March 1679 in Wanfried – 18 February 1722 in Paris) was a Princess consort of Transylvania as the wife of Francis II Rákóczi. She was born the daughter of Charles, Landgrave of Hesse-Wanfried, ruler of Hesse-Wanfried and his second wife, Countess Alexandrine Juliane of Leiningen-Dagsburg (1651–1703).

== Life ==
Charlotte Amalia was born as the eldest child of Charles of Hesse-Wanfried, Alexandrine and his second wife Alexandrine Juliane of Leiningen-Dagsburg (1651–1703). Charlotte's maternal grandparents were Count Emich XIII of Leiningen and Dorothea of Waldeck-Wildungen.

Since her parents had been married previously she had three half-siblings on her father's side and from her mother's first marriage to George III, Landgrave of Hesse-Itter she had two half-sisters, Eleanore and Magdalene Sibylle. She also had several full siblings. The relationship between her parents were said to be happy and she grew up in a harmonious family.

=== Marriage ===
On 26 September 1694 in Cologne the 15 year old Charlotte was married to the 18 year old Rákóczi. Rákóczi came from one of the richest and most important families in Hungary. The marriage was performed without the permission of the emperor, Leopold I. who held the legal guardianship of her husband. After their marriage the couple moved to Šariš Castle.

==== Issue ====
- Leopold (1696–1699)
- József (1700–1738)
- György (1701–1752)
- Charlotte (1706–1706)

==== Husband's involvement in the Hungarian War of Independence ====
The mother-in-law of Charlotte, Ilona Zrinyi and her husband Imre Thököly had been involved in the Kuruc rebellions against the Habsburg army in Upper Hungary. When Habsburg General Heisler was captured by Thököly, a prisoner exchange was arranged, and Ilona joined her husband in Transylvania. In 1699, however, after the Treaty of Karlowitz was signed, both spouses, having found themselves on the losing side, had to go into exile in the Ottoman Empire. Because of this Rákóczi remained in Vienna under the Emperor's supervision. Her husband started to resent both the emperors involvement in his life but also the way the Hungarian nobility was not allowed to govern their own country.

Together with other Hungarian nobles who felt the same way, Francis II planned an uprising in 1701, but he and his allies were betrayed and he was arrested at his castle at Gross-Scharosch on 18 April 1701; he did not flee, because he did not want to leave Charlotte Amalie, who was ill.

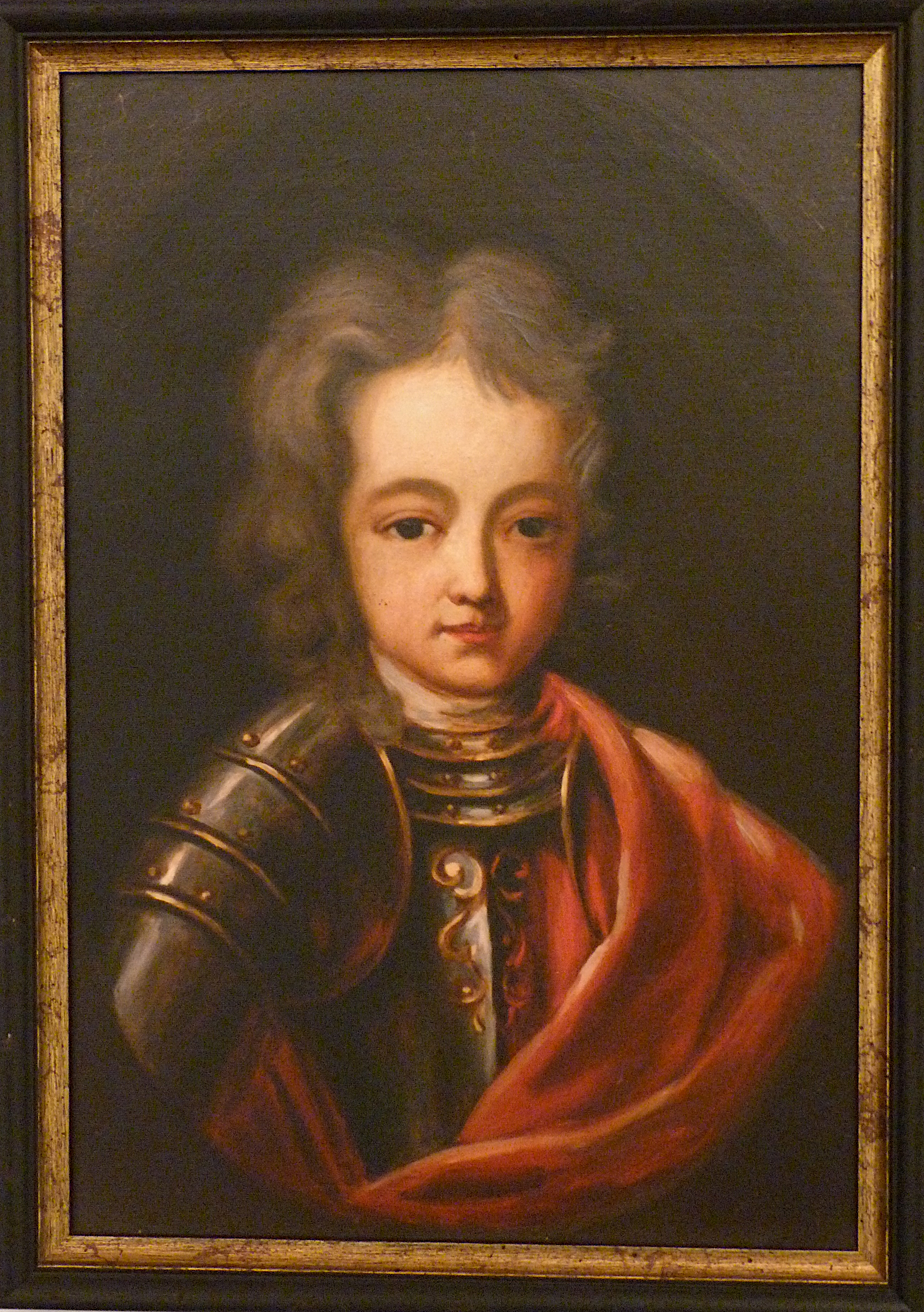
György Rákóczi

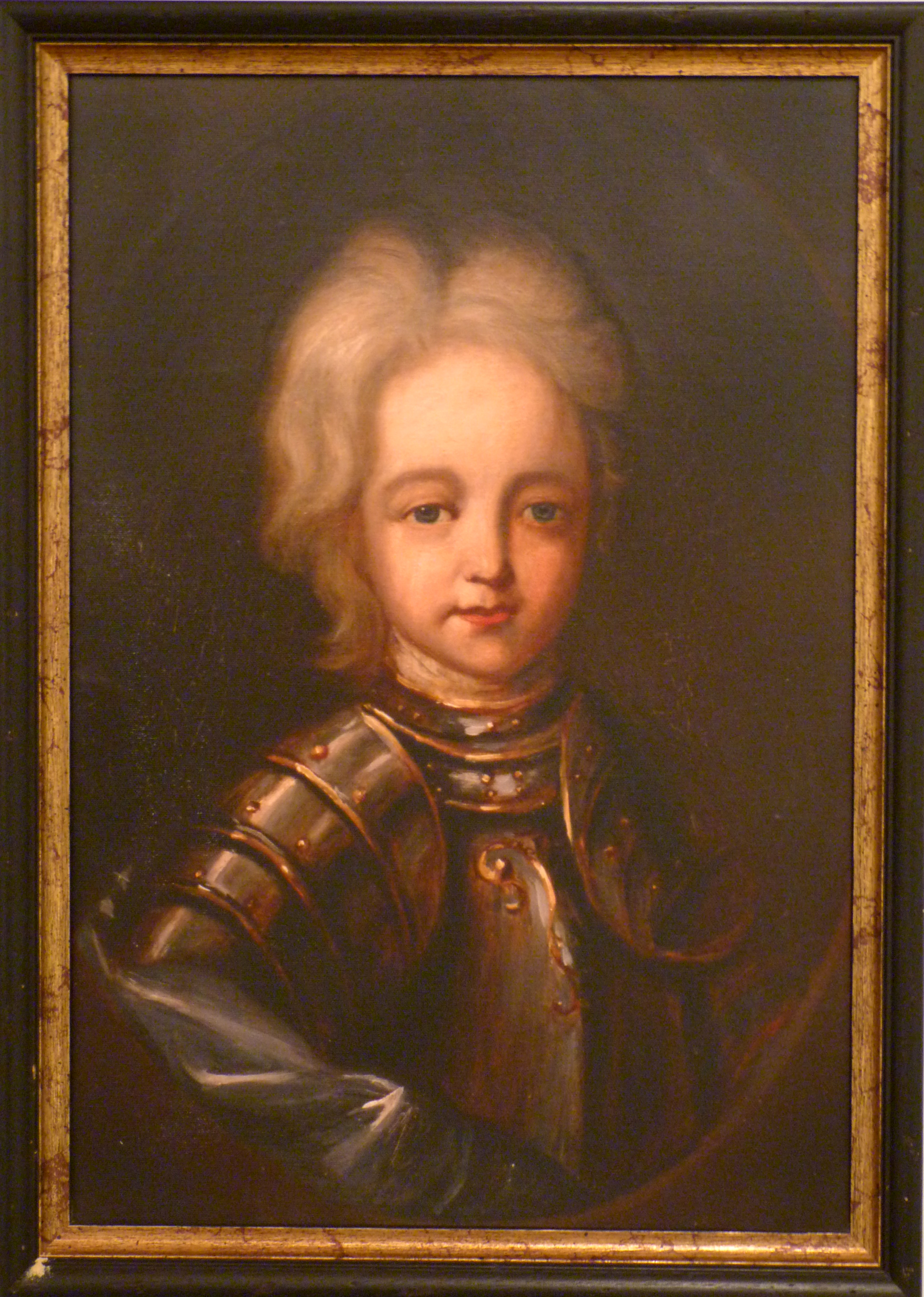
Joszef Rákóczi

He was taken to a prison in Wiener Neustadt where the death penalty also awaited him, but thanks to the help of Charlotte Amalie, he managed to escape to Warsaw. She furthermore succeeded in bribing the commandant of the prison, Gottfried von Lehnsfeld, with a large sum of money, allowing Rákóczi to escape on 24 November 1701, disguised in a dragoon uniform. When Charlotte's involvement in her husband's escape became known, she was placed under house arrest and by order of the Emperor her two sons were taken from her and educated at the Viennese court.

After she was released from custody, she lived mostly at the Polish court in Warsaw and at the Russian court in St. Petersburg where she is said to have led a rather dissolute life. Her youngest daughter Charlotte was said to be the result of an extramarital relationship.

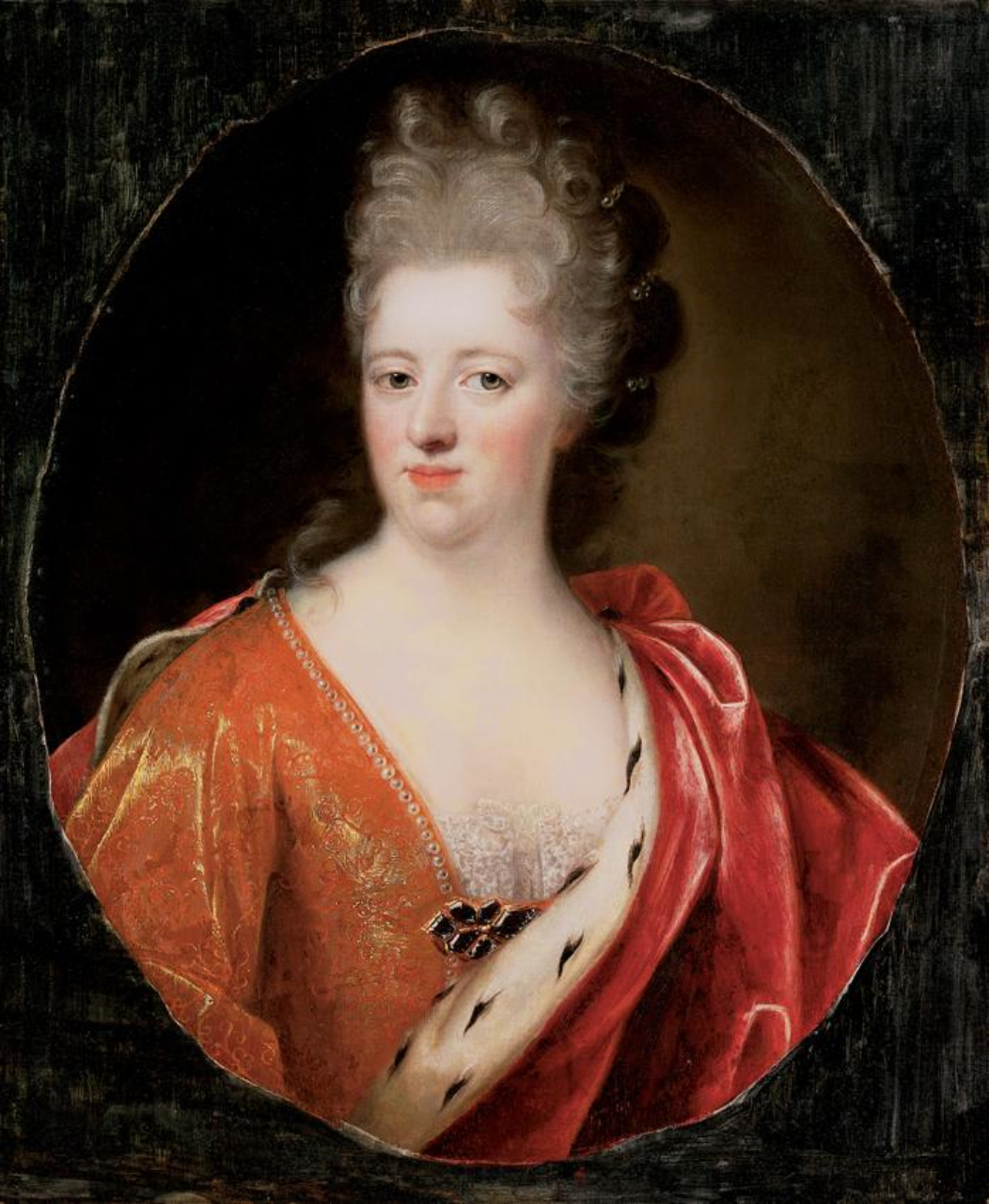
Charlotte Amalie by Adam Manyoki (1707)

In 1706, during the Habsburg peace negotiations with Rákóczi, Princess Charlotte Amalie was able to see her husband again, because it was hoped that she could influence her husband to accept the terms of the treaty. In February 1711, she met her husband again in Nitra after the prince left Hungary but by this point in time the couple were completely estranged and her husband was openly carrying on an affair with the princess Sienawski who like her lover was involved in the anti-Habsburg insurrections in Hungary, which she financially and politically supported.

The relationship between Charlotte and her husband was now completely broken.

He went into exile in Paris in 1713 after rejecting the treaty and an amnesty for himself.

== Death ==
In the late autumn of 1721 she went to the Parisian monastery of Chases-Midi. While there she had to have a tooth extracted on February 16, 1722. This was followed by a tooth ulcer and fever, whereupon she was bled by a doctor. Charlotte Amalie was said to have seen in a dream about 20 years before the scene of her death both the room and the man who would give her the last drink, and that in Paris she recognized this man, the physician Helvetius, and the room, the bedroom of an apartment rented for her, and pointed this out to her companion.

She died shortly afterwards, on 18 February 1722, and was buried in the cemetery of the monastery. The monastery and cemetery were plundered during the French Revolution, and her grave was destroyed.
