= Borša =

Borša Borsi
- Municipality
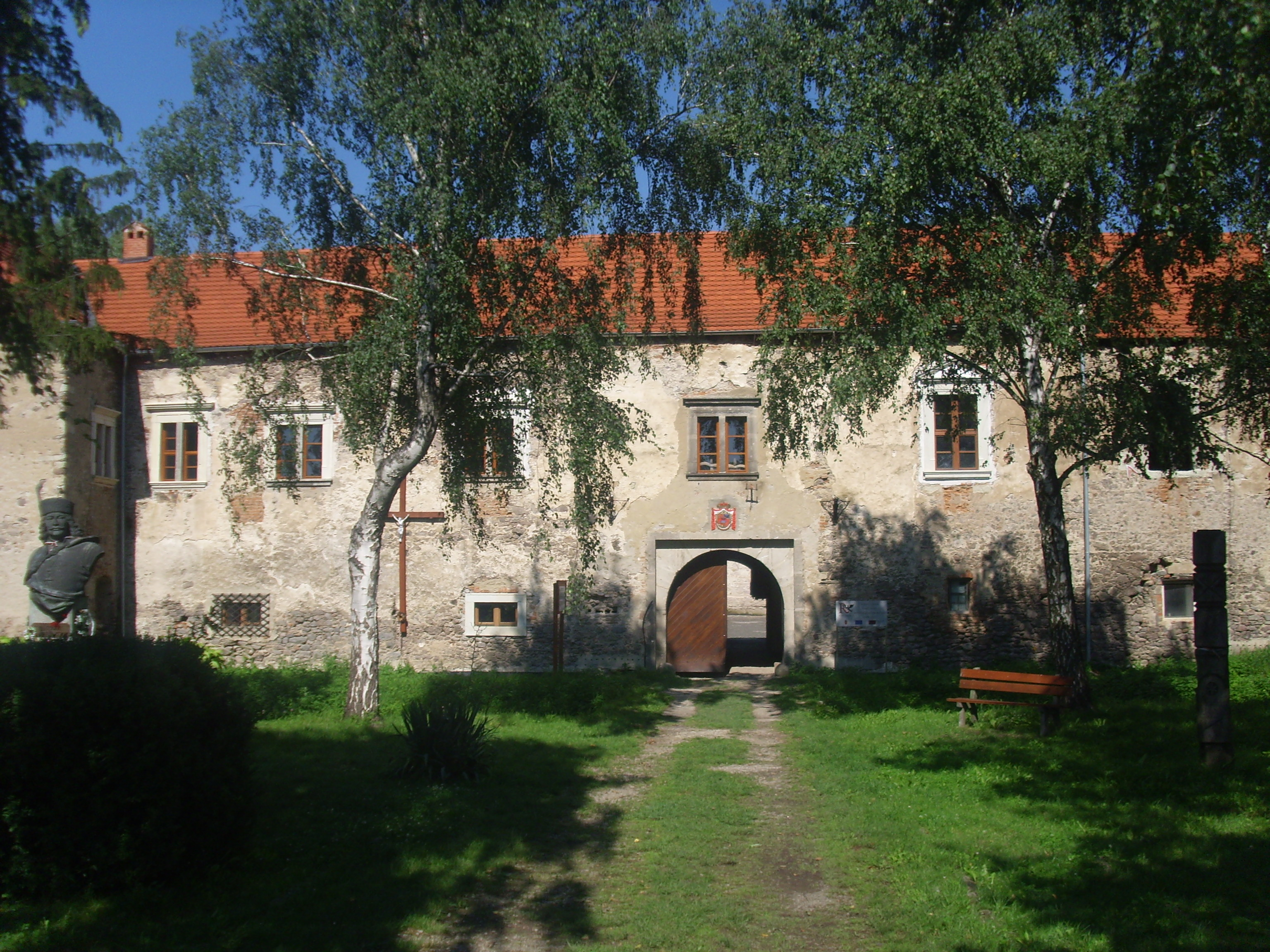
- Rakóczi castle of Borsa

- Flag

- Location of Borša in the Košice Region Location of Borša in Slovakia
- Coordinates: 48.40°N 21.71°E
- Country: Slovakia
- Region: Košice Region
- District: Trebišov District
- First mentioned: 1221

Government
  - Mayor: Anna Tünde Vargová since 2018; Independent

Area
  - Total: 9.54 km^{2} (3.68 sq mi)
- Elevation: 101 m (331 ft)

Population (2025)
  - Total: 1,109
- Time zone: UTC+1 (CET)
  - Summer (DST): UTC+2 (CEST)
- Postal code: 763 2
- Area code: +421 56
- Vehicle registration plate (until 2022): TV
- Website: www.obecborsa.sk

Borša (Hungarian: Borsi) is a village and municipality in the Trebišov District in the Košice Region of eastern Slovakia. The village is famed as the birthplace of Francis II Rákóczi.

== History ==
In historical records the village was first mentioned in 1221. Borša is the hometown of Francis II Rákóczi who was born here on 27 March 1676.

Rákóczi's castle in the village is being under reconstruction since 2018, serving as a museum.

== Geography ==
The municipality lies at an altitude of 101 metres (331 ft) and covers an area of 9.54 km^{2} (3.68 sq mi) (2025).

== Population ==
Population statistic (10 years)
Year	1995	2005	2015	2025
Count	1375	1240	1170	1109
Difference		−9.81%	−5.64%	−5.21%

Population statistic
Year	2024	2025
Count	1119	1109
Difference		−0.89%

It has a population of 1109 people (31 December 2025).

=== Ethnicity ===
Census 2021 (1+ %)
Ethnicity	Number	Fraction
Slovak	727	63.43%
Hungarian	531	46.33%
Not found out	32	2.79%
Total	1146	

In year 2021 was 1146 people by ethnicity 727 as Slovak, 531 as Hungarian, 32 as Not found out, 5 as Czech, 2 as Other, 1 as Russian, 1 as Polish, 1 as Bulgarian and 1 as English.

Note on population: The difference values of population numbers in the table "Population statistic" and in the sections "Ethnicity" & "Religion" is caused by the use of various statistical methods.

By the beginning of 20th century, the village had an absolute Hungarian majority. In census of 1910 during the period of Magyarization, the village had 783 inhabitants, of which 778 were Hungarians.

=== Religion ===
Census 2021 (1+ %)
Religion	Number	Fraction
Roman Catholic Church	429	37.43%
Greek Catholic Church	397	34.64%
Calvinist Church	180	15.71%
None	75	6.54%
Not found out	34	2.97%
Evangelical Church	12	1.05%
Total	1146	

In year 2021 was 1146 people by religion 429 from Roman Catholic Church, 397 from Greek Catholic Church, 180 from Calvinist Church, 75 from None, 34 from Not found out, 12 from Evangelical Church, 11 from Jehovah's Witnesses, 3 from Buddhism, 2 from Other, 1 from Jewish community, 1 from Paganism and natural spirituality and 1 from Apostolic Church.

== Facilities ==
The village has a public library and a football pitch.

== Genealogical resources ==
The records for genealogical research are available at the state archive "Statny Archiv in Kosice, Slovakia"

- Reformated church records (births/marriages/deaths): 1758–1924 (parish B)

== See also ==
- List of municipalities and towns in Slovakia
