= Rákóczi =

Hungarian Noble House

House of Rákóczi
- Parent family: Bogát-Radván Clan
- Country: Principality of Transylvania, Kingdom of Hungary
- Final ruler: Francis II
- Titles: Princeps of Transilvania; Princep of Hungary; Count
- Estates: Principality of Hungary, Principality of Transylvania

The House of Rákóczi (older spelling Rákóczy) was a Hungarian noble family in the Kingdom of Hungary between the 13th century and 18th century. Their name is also spelled Rákoci (in Slovakia), Rakoczi and Rakoczy in some foreign sources. The family was named after Rákóc (Rakovec, now Rakovec nad Ondavou, Slovakia).

The family originated from the Bogátradvány clan which had Bohemian roots, according to Simon of Kéza's chronicle. The foundations for the family's wealth and power were laid down by Sigismund Rákóczi; some decades into the 17th century, the Rákóczis became the wealthiest aristocrats of Hungary. Most famous was Francis II Rákóczi, who led an unsuccessful revolt against Habsburg rule between 1703 and 1711.

== Family legacy ==
The last member of the family was György (George) Rákóczi, the son of Francis II Rákóczi, who died in France in 1756.

The mysterious Count of St. Germain is believed by some to have been the son of Prince Francis (Ferenc) II Rákóczi.

The Rákóczi March by János Bihari and (memorably orchestrated by Hector Berlioz) refers to them.

The Hungarian Rhapsody No. 15 by Franz Liszt refers to the rebellion led by Francis II Rákóczi.

== History ==
=== Sigismund Rákóczi ===
Rákoczi family coat of arms

Sigismund Rákóczi briefly reigned as Prince of Transylvania from 1607 to 1608.

=== George Rákóczi I ===
George Rákóczi I (born June 8, 1593, Szerencs – Oct. 11, 1648) was the prince of Transylvania from 1630. In 1643, Rákóczi formed an alliance with Sweden. In February 1644, leading a 30,000-man army, he launched a campaign against the Habsburgs in the Thirty Years War. Peasants who struggled for national liberation in the Kingdom of Hungary supported him. He also encouraged the development of the mining industry and commerce.

=== George Rákóczi II ===
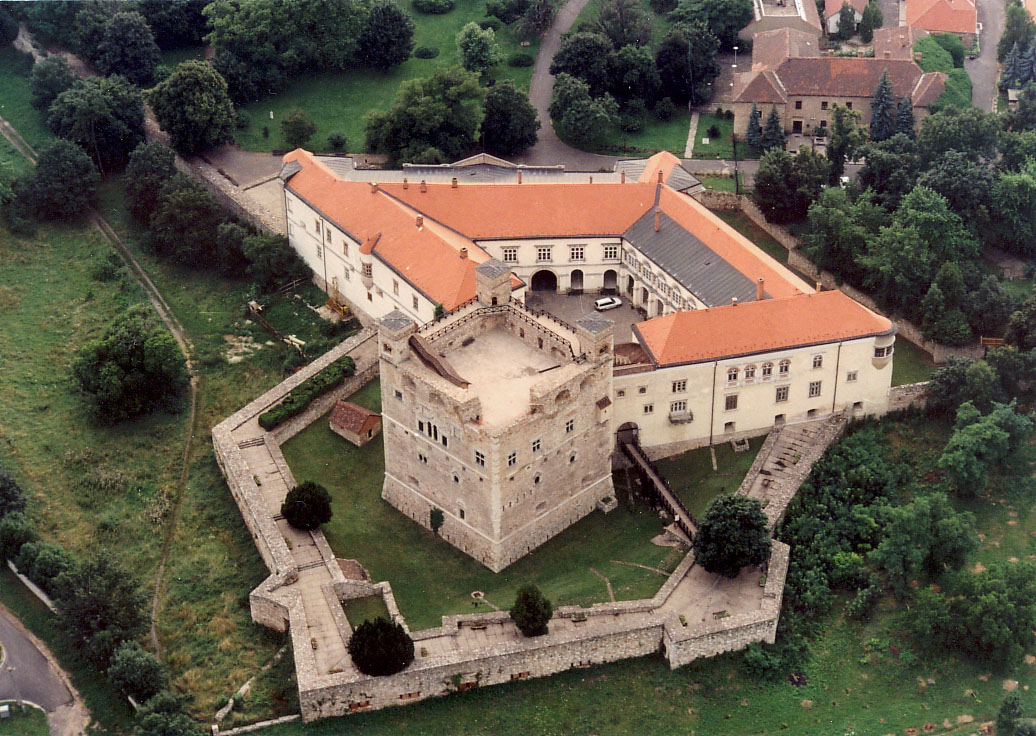
The Rákóczi Castle in Sárospatak

George Rákóczi II (30 January 1621, Hungary – June 7, 1660) was a Hungarian nobleman and prince of Transylvania (1648–1660). In 1657, he led an army of 40,000 men against King John II Casimir of Poland in the third part of the Second Northern War (1655–1660). He took Kraków and entered Warsaw with the Swedes, but the moment his allies withdrew, he was defeated by the Poles at Czarny Ostrów. Finally, the Poles allowed him to return to Transylvania. When the Turks invaded Transylvania, he died at the battle of Gyalu (Gilău) in May 1660.

=== Francis Rákóczi I ===
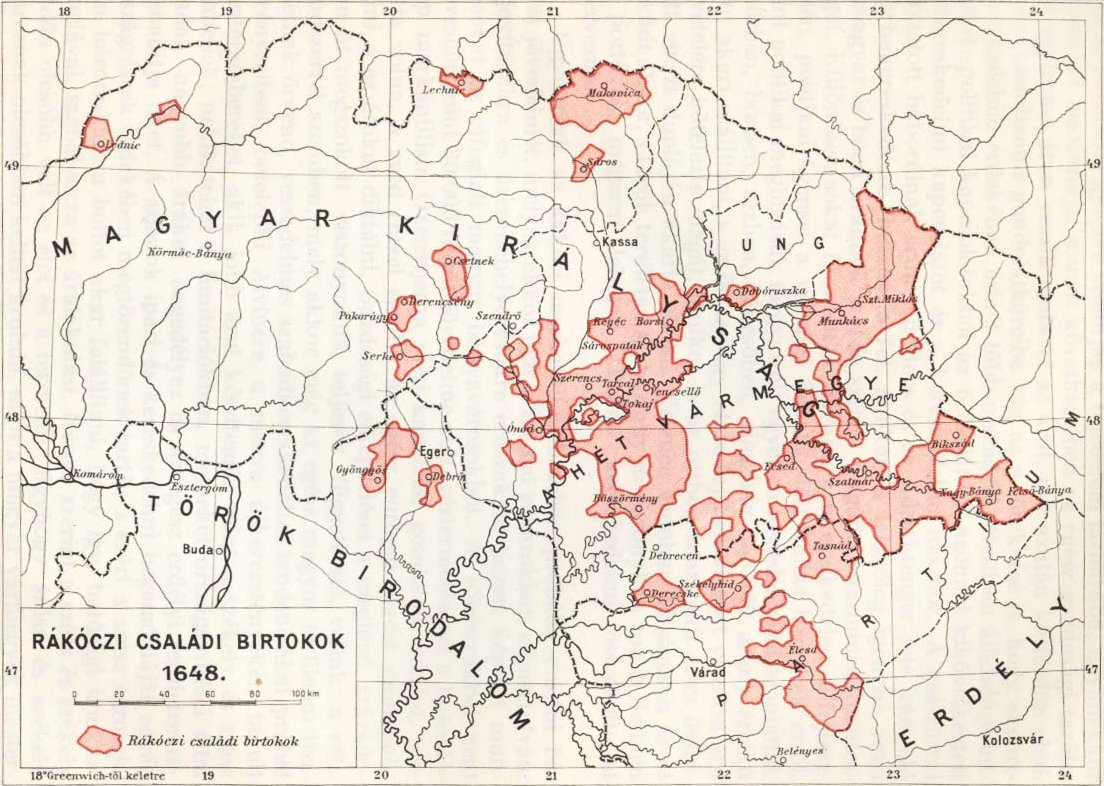
Estates of the Rákóczi family. Map by Bálint Hóman

Francis Rákóczi I (February 24, 1645, Gyulafehérvár, Transylvania – July 8, 1676, Zboró, Royal Hungary) was the elected prince of Transylvania and Hungarian aristocrat. He was the son of George II Rákóczi, who was the prince of Transylvania, though George transferred his power to his son in 1652 through the Transylvanian Diet. However, Francis was never able to occupy this role because the Ottoman government prohibited Rákóczi inheritance of the Transylvanian throne in 1660. Francis therefore lived as an aristocrat in Royal Hungary.

In terms of religion, Francis I broke with the Calvinist Rákóczi tradition by converting to Catholicism in imitation of his mother, Zsófia Báthori, which gained him favor with the Catholic Habsburg Court. Francis I married Croatian-Hungarian countess Ilona Zrínyi in 1666 and had three children, György (1667); Julianna Borbála (1672–1717); and Francis II (1676–1735). He soon joined the Wesselenyi Conspiracy as a result of his marriage to Zrínyi. He became the leader of this group and attempted to stage an uprising among Hungarian nobles, but this was poorly organized and was soon crushed by the Austrian government.

=== Francis II Rákóczi ===
Francis Rákóczi II (March 27, 1676, Borsi, Hungary – April 8, 1735, Tekirdağ, Turkey), also known as Ferenc II Rákóczi, was the prince of Transylvania and leader of the last major Hungarian uprising against Austria until 1848. He is celebrated as a national hero in Hungary.

Francis was raised by Austrian standards and attended a Jesuit college in Bohemia, though he was majorly influenced by the nationalist fervor of his family growing up. Francis returned to his estates in Hungary in 1694 and was elected prince of Transylvania in 1704.

Around the turn of the 18th century, King Louis XIV sought Rákóczi's help in his attempt to reduce Austrian power and promised to aid Rákóczi in return for an attempt at Hungarian independence. However, Rakoczi was arrested in 1700 after an Austrian spy alerted the emperor. He escaped to Poland and at the start of the War of the Spanish Succession, he led a Kuruc uprising in an attempt to gain Hungarian independence, leading to the War for Independence.

However, the war failed, and Francis left Hungary forever in 1711, living in Turkey. He is commemorated by statues and monuments throughout Hungary, as well as in the Rákóczi March.

== Major events ==
=== War for Independence ===
In 1678, anti-Habsburg revolutionaries led by Imre Thököly and aided by Louis XIV of France and the Ottomans rose in uprising against the Habsburgs. After the failed Battle of Vienna in 1683, Thököly lost support and was defeated in 1685.

Around 1700, Louis XIV reached out again, this time to Francis II Rákóczi, in his attempt to mitigate Austrian power. Francis was arrested for this correspondence but eventually escaped to Poland. The War of the Spanish Succession forced much of the Austrian army to leave Hungary, creating an opportunity to revolt. The Kurucs, or the anti-Habsburg rebels, began an uprising headed by Rákóczi. However, very few nobles supported the revolution. Additionally, Austrian military victories over the French and the Bavarians caused aid to the revolution to falter. By 1706, Rákóczi was forced to retreat. Peace negotiations were largely unsuccessful, and Hungarian defeat at the Battle of Trencsén solidified Austrian victory.

== See also ==
- List of titled noble families in the Kingdom of Hungary
