= 1st Parachute Hussar Regiment =

- 1^{e} Régiment de Hussards Parachutistes
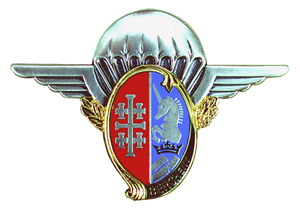
- Regimental Insignia of the 1^{er} RHP
- Active: 1720 – 1815; 1816 – 1928; 1928 – 1940; 1945 – present
- Country: France
- Branch: French Army
- Type: Airborne Cavalry
- Part of: 11th Parachute Brigade; 3rd Division
- Garrison/HQ: Tarbes
- Nickname: Bercheny
- Patron: St Michel, St Georges
- Mottos: "Omnia si perdas, famam servare memento" "Si tu as tout perdu, souviens-toi qu'il reste l'honneur" (Fr) "If you lost everything, remember there is still honor" (Eng)
- Colors: Red and blue
- Equipment: see Equipment
- Engagements: War of the Polish Succession War of the Austrian Succession; Seven Years' War; French Revolutionary Wars; Napoleonic Wars; Ten Days' Campaign; Crimean War; Franco-Prussian War; World War I World War II; Algerian War; Lebanese Civil War: United Nations Interim Force in Lebanon; Multinational Force in Lebanon; Gulf War; War on terror (2001-present): War in Afghanistan (2001–present)
- Decorations: see Decorations
- Battle honours: see Battle Honours

Commanders
- Current commander: Colonel De Montgros
- Abbreviation: 1^{e} RHP

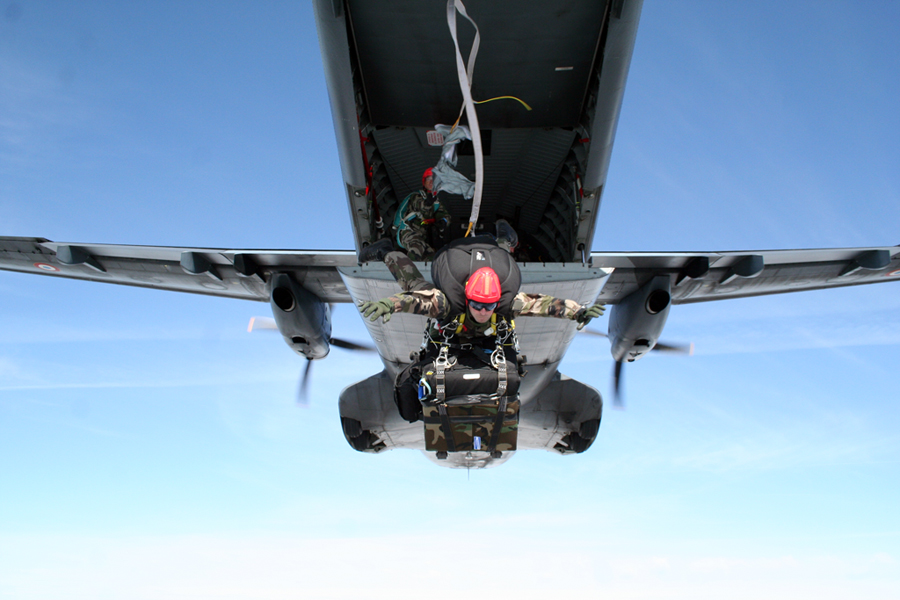
A Parachute Commando of a GCP Team from the 1st Parachute Hussar Regiment commencing airborne drop.

The 1st Parachute Hussar Regiment (French: 1^{er} Régiment de Hussards Parachutistes, 1^{er} RHP) is an airborne cavalry unit in the French Army, founded in 1720 by Hungarian noble Ladislas Ignace de Bercheny. It is stationed in Tarbes and is a part of the 11th Parachute Brigade.

== Creation and different nominations ==
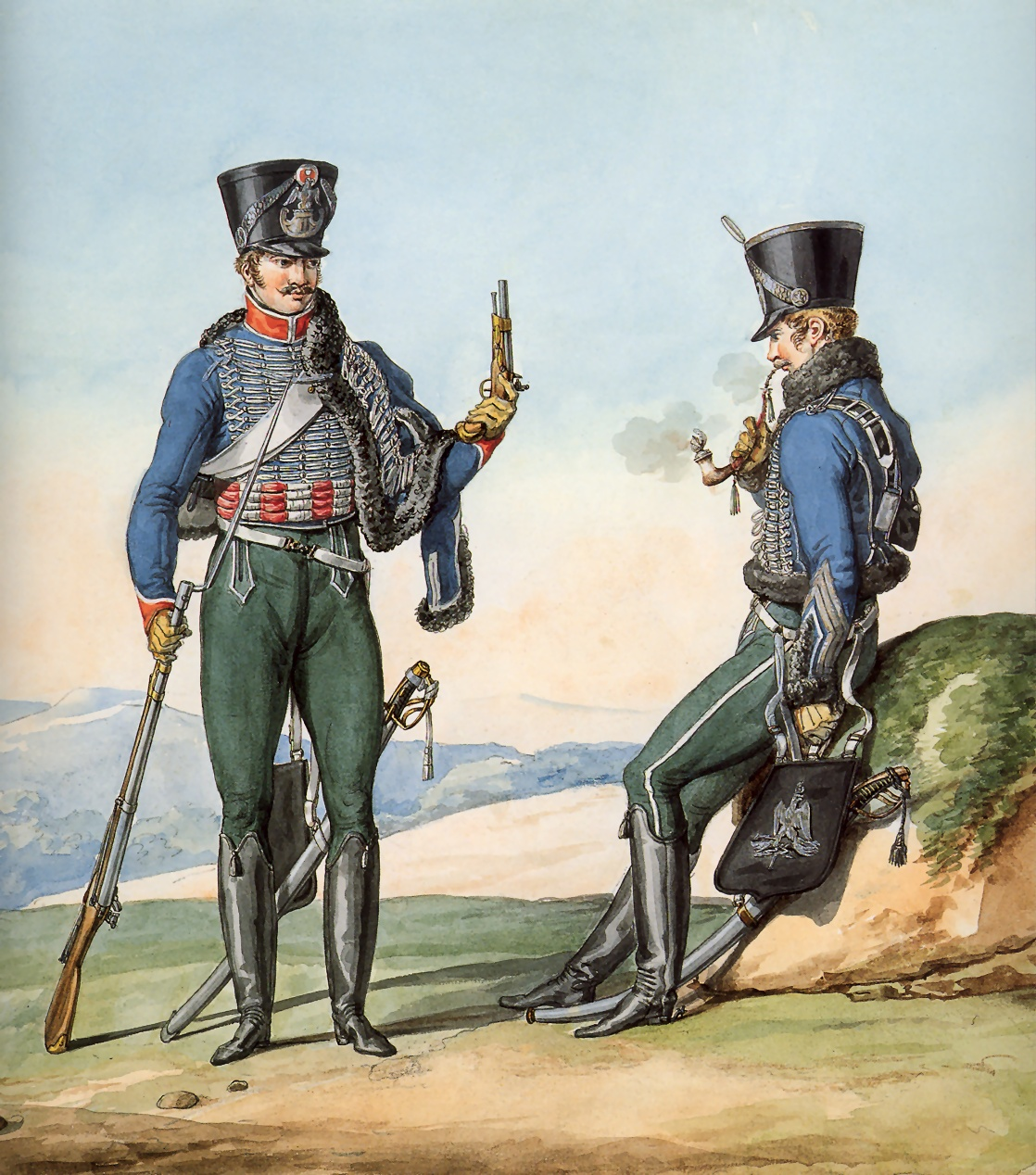
1st Hussars during the Napoleonic Wars

- 1719-1720: By order of the Regent Philippe, the Count of Bercheny recruits 174 Hungarian exiles in Constantinople for service in France. These become the Regiment of Bercheny Houzards.
- 1791: Units of the French Army are named after their function of arms and numbered in terms of their seniority. The Regiment of Bercheny becomes accordingly the 1st Hussar Regiment.
- 29 Floréal an IV in the Republican Calendar (18 May 1796): The regiment received half of the 13th Hussar Regiment (French: 13^{e} régiment de hussards).
- 1815: The regiment is dissolved.
- 1816: Creation of the 1st Hussar Regiment of Jura.
- 1824: Redesignated as 1st Hussar Regiment of Chartres.
- 1940: dissolved following the Armistice of 22 June 1940 with Germany.
- 1945: recreated by the political resistance during World War II and designated Reconnaissance Regiment of the 25th Division.
- 1946: designated as 1st Parachute Hussar Regiment in the 25th Airborne Division (25^{e} Division Aéroportée on the occasion of the regiment's voyage to Algeria.

== Operational History ==
=== Campaigns ===
( 1733 - 1918 )

- 1733 : War of the Polish Succession
- 1741 - 1748 : War of the Austrian Succession
- 1756 - 1763 : Seven Years' War
- 1792 - 1802 : French Revolutionary Wars
- 1803 - 1815 : Napoleonic Wars
- 1831 : Ten Days' Campaign
- 1854 : Crimean War
- 1870 - 1871 : Franco-Prussian War
- 1871 - 1882 : Algeria
- 1914 - 1918 : World War I

( 1940 - 1990 )

- 1940 : World War II
- 1946 : Algeria
- 1948 : First Indochina War
- 1956 : Morocco
- 1956 - 1961 : Algeria
- 1978 : Lebanon, UNIFIL
- 1979 : Chad, Opération Tacaud
- 1983 : Lebanon, Multinational Force in Lebanon
- 1984 : Chad, Operation Manta
- 1990 : Kuwait, Gulf War

( 1993 - 1999 )

- 1993 : Yugoslavia, UNPROFOR
- 1994 : Rwanda, Opération Turquoise
- 1995 : Chad
- 1995 : Yugoslavia, UNPROFOR
- 1996 : Yugoslavia, IFOR
- 1999 : Macedonia
- 1999 : Albania
- 1999 : French Guiana
- 1999 : Chad, Operation Epervier
- 1999 : Kosovo

( 2000 - 2003 )

- 2000 : Côte d'Ivoire
- 2001 : Kosovo, KFOR
- 2001 : Côte d'Ivoire
- 2002 : Chad, Operation Epervier
- 2002 : Kosovo, KFOR
- 2002 : Côte d'Ivoire, Opération Licorne
- 2003 : DR Congo, Operation Artemis
- 2003 : Central African Republic
- 2003 : Bosnia and Herzegovina, SFOR
- 2003 : Kosovo, KFOR

( 2003 - 2007 )

- 2003 : Afghanistan
- 2004 : Côte d'Ivoire, Opération Licorne
- 2004 : Haiti
- 2004 : Senegal
- 2004 : Kosovo
- 2005 : Côte d'Ivoire, Opération Licorne
- 2006 : Afghanistan
- 2006 : Côte d'Ivoire, Opération Licorne
- 2006 : Kosovo
- 2007 : Afghanistan

( 2007 – present )

- 2007 : Kosovo
- 2007 : Chad, Operation Epervier
- 2008 : Afghanistan
- 2008 - 2009: Chad, EUFOR Tchad/RCA
- 2010 : Kosovo
- 2010 : Afghanistan
- 2012 : Lebanon

== Composition ==
The 1^{er} RHP consists of:

- Command and Logistics Squadron (ECL)
- 1st Squadron, Air-transportable armored (1er Escadron)
  - 6 VBL
  - 3 AMX 10 RC
  - 6 VAB C20
- 2nd Squadron, Air-transportable armored (2e Escadron)
  - 13 VBL
  - 12 ERC 90 Sagaie
- 3rd Squadron, Reconnaissance and Anti-Tank (ERIAC) (only unit fully parachutable, both men and equipment) (3e Escadron)
  - VBL
    - VBL reconnaissance, 7.62 mm AA-52 machine gun
    - VBL anti-tank, MMP anti-tank missile
    - VBL support, 12.7 mm M2 Browning machine gun
    - VBL command
- 4th Squadron, Air-transportable armored (4e Escadron)
  - 13 VBL
  - 12 ERC 90 Sagaie
- 5th Squadron, Reconnaissance and Anti-Tank (ERIAC) (5e Escadron)
  - VBL
    - VBL reconnaissance, 7.62 mm AA-52 machine gun
    - VBL anti-tank, MMP anti-tank missile
    - VBL support, 12.7 mm M2 Browning machine gun
    - VBL command
- 6th Squadron, operational reserve (6e Escadron)
- 11th Squadron, training and education (disbanded on 14 January 2011 and restored in 2025)
- 2 GCP Teams

=== Equipment ===
==== Vehicles ====
- AMX 10 RC (3)
- ERC 90 Sagaie (36)
- Véhicule Blindé Léger (68)
- Peugeot P4 (84)
- Cagiva motorcycles
- Véhicule de l'Avant Blindé

==== Weapons ====
- MILAN anti-tank guided missile (24)

== Traditions ==
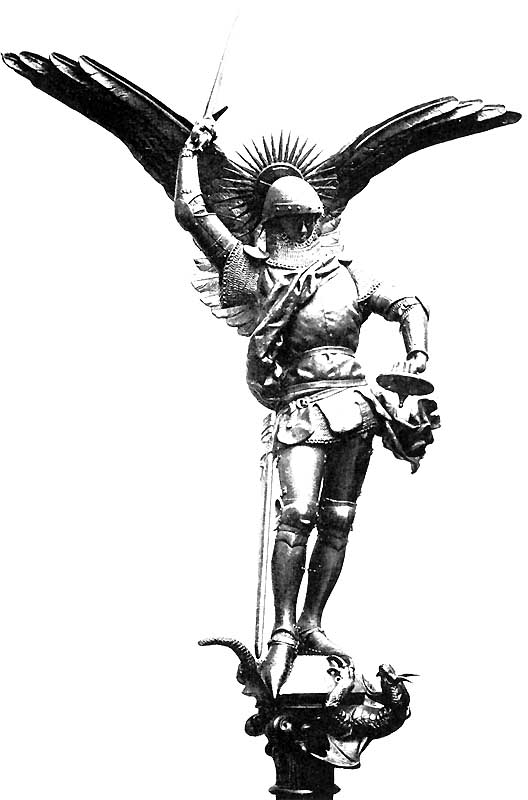
The Archangel Michael featured in Mont Saint-Michel and the Insignia of the 9th Parachute Chasseur Regiment.

Except for the Legionnaires of the 1^{er} REG, 2^{ème} REG, 2^{ème} REP that conserve the Green Beret; the remainder of the French army metropolitan and marine paratroopers forming the 11th Parachute Brigade wear the Red Beret.

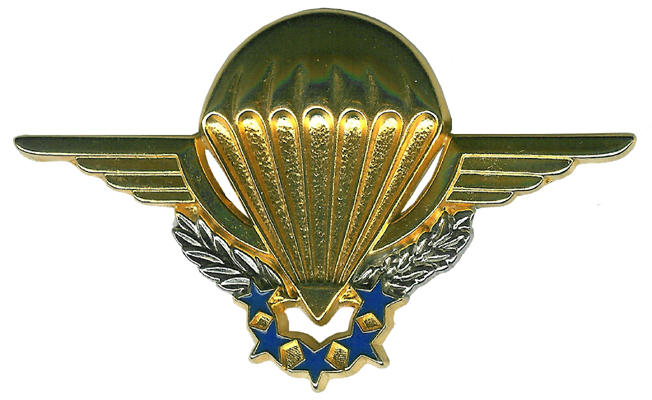
French Commando Parachute Group Brevet of Chuteur Opérationnel

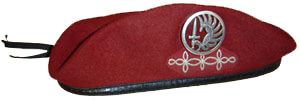
1^{er} Circled Winged Armed Dextrochere of French Army Metropolitan Paratroopers

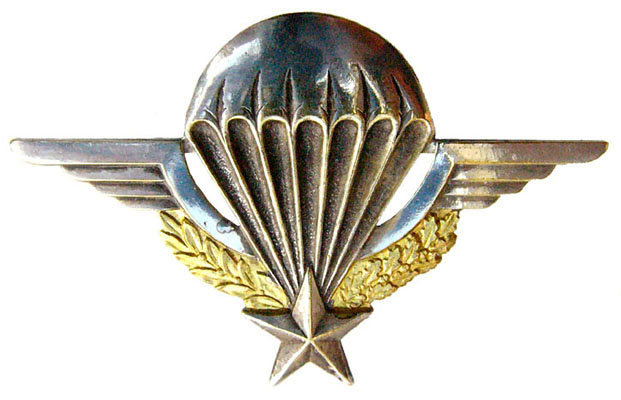
French Parachute Brevet.

The Archangel Saint Michael, patron of the French paratroopers is celebrated on September 29.

The prière du Para (Prayer of the Paratrooper) was written by André Zirnheld in 1938.

=== Insignias ===
Just like the paratrooper Brevet of the French Army; the Insignia of French Paratroopers was created in 1946. The French Army Insignia of metropolitan Paratroopers represents a closed "winged armed dextrochere", meaning a "right winged arm" armed with a sword pointing upwards. The Insignia makes reference to the Patron of Paratroopers. In fact, the Insignia represents "the right Arm of Saint Michael", the Archangel which according to Liturgy is the "Armed Arm of God". This Insignia is the symbol of righteous combat and fidelity to superior missions.

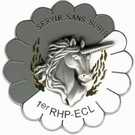
Escadron de commandement et de logistique (ECL).
Servir Sans Subir

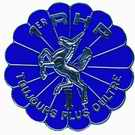
1^{er} Escadron.
Toujours plus Oultre

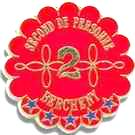
2^{e} Escadron.
Second de Personne

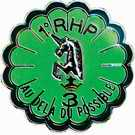
3^{e} Escadron (ERIAC).
Au Dela du Possible

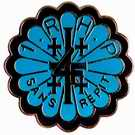
4^{e} Escadron.
Sans Repit

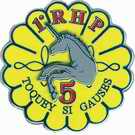
5^{e} Escadron (reserve).
Toquey Si Gauses

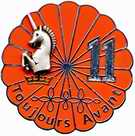
11^{e} Escadron (disbanded on 14 January 2011).
Toujours Avant

=== Regimental colours ===
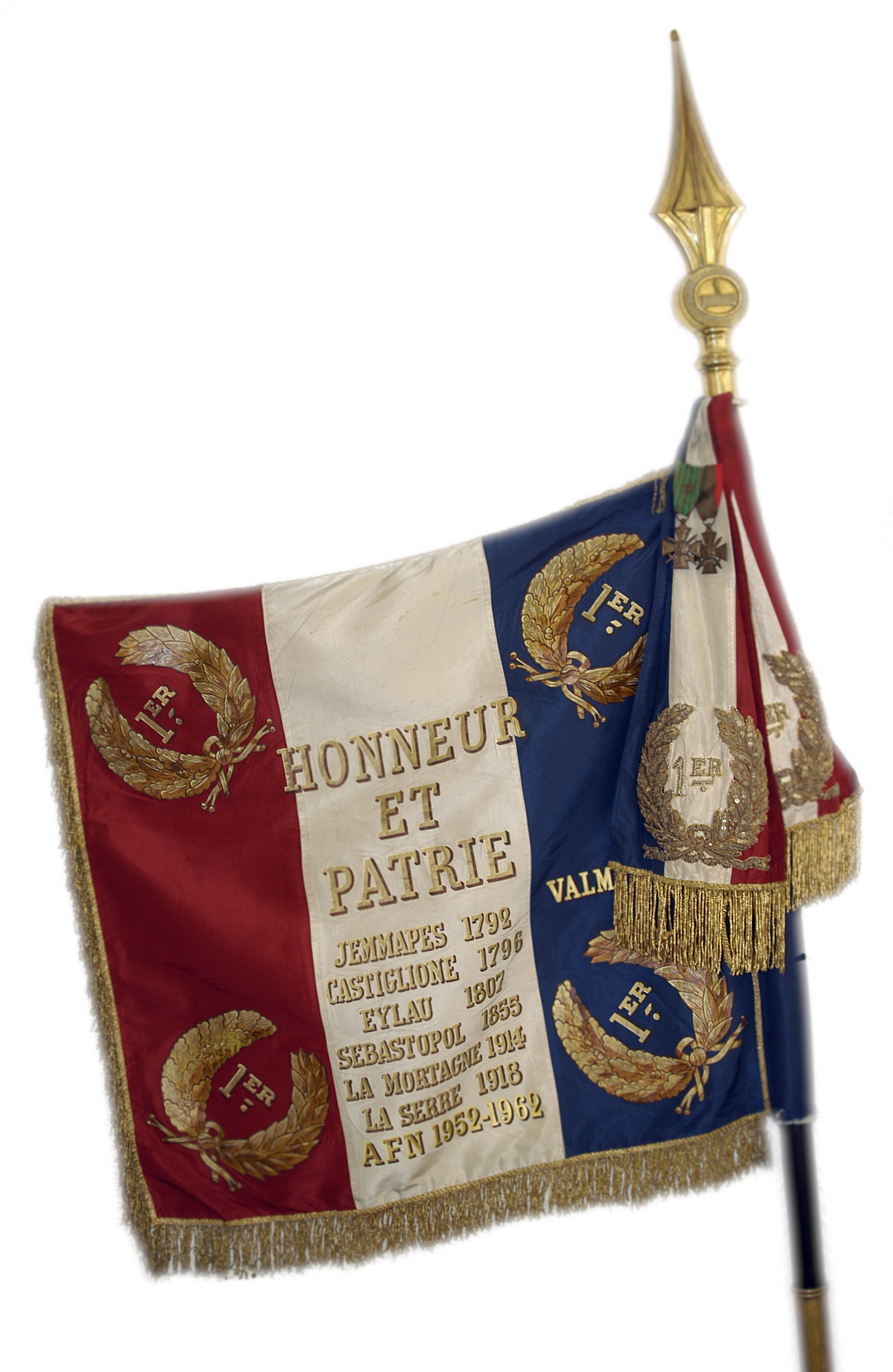
Regimental colours of the 1^{er} RHP

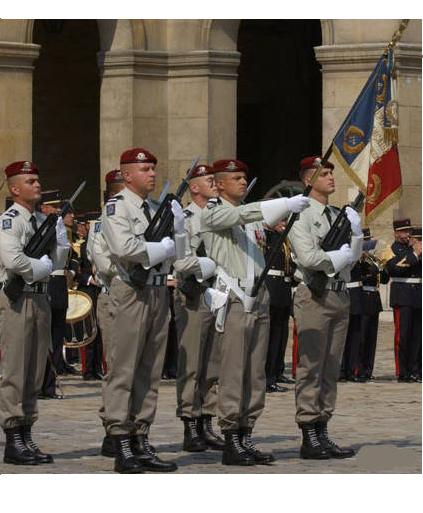
Regimental colour guard of the 1^{er} RHP.

Regimental colours of the 1st Parachute Hussars Regiment with battle respective honours

=== Regimental song ===
Based on the melody of the revolutionary Polish song Whirlwinds of Danger :

Original version

Pour libérer le pays qu'on enchaîne,
Briser ses liens, massacrer ses ennemis,
Il est des gars endurcis à la peine
Chacun pour tous et tous pour un réunis.

Voyez, bonnes gens, largués sur la plaine,
Tombant du ciel et rampant seuls dans la nuit,
Ne craignant rien, ni la peur, ni la haine,
Voyez, ce sont les hussards de Bercheny.

Autour de nous, attendant l'esclavage,
Les libéraux se vautrent dans leur veulerie.
Pour eux la paix, mais pour nous le courage
De risquer tout pour secourir la Patrie.

Ô parachutiste, voilà l'orage,
Montrons-nous fiers de nos anciens d'Algérie,
Rien n'est trop dur pour un gars de notre âge,
S'il est Para de Bercheny Cavalerie.

Actual official version

Pour libérer le pays qu'on enchaîne,
Prêts au combat pour repousser ses ennemis,
Il faut des gars endurcis à la peine,
Chacun pour tous et tous pour un réunis.

Voyez, braves gens, largués sur la plaine,
Tombant du ciel et progressant dans la nuit,
Ne craignant rien, ni la mort, ni la haine,
Voyez ce sont les hussards de Bercheny.

Autour de nous la bataille fait rage,
Si certains tombent sous les coups de l'ennemi,
Pour eux la paix et à nous le courage
De risquer tout pour secourir la Patrie.

Ô parachutiste, voilà l'orage,
Montrons nous fiers de nos anciens de Hongrie,
Rien n'est trop dur pour un gars de notre âge,
S'il est para de Bercheny Cavalerie

The Bercheny Song (in Hungarian)

Gyenge violának
Letörött az ága
Az én bánatomnak
Nincs vigasztalása

Refrain :
Suhog a szél
Késmárk felett
Édes rózsám
Isten veled

Nagy Bercsényi Miklós
Sirdogál magában
Elfogyott szegénynek
Minden katonája

Refrain :
Suhog a szél
Késmárk felett
Édes hazám
Isten veled

Pronunciation of the Hungarian Song

Dienne guen vi o la nack
Les teureute aze aga
Aze éne bana tome nack
Nintche vigas ta la cha

Refrain (bis) :
Chou hogue a sell
Kéchemark failette
Edeche ro jame
Ichtene velaide

Nadie Bertchényi Micloche
Chir do gal ma gabane
Elfodiote se guénie neck
Mine daine cato naya

Refrain (bis) :
Chou hogue a sell
Kéchemark failette
Edeche hazame
Ichtene velaide

French Translation of the Hungarian Song

Giroflée frêle
À cassé sa branche
Ma tristesse
Reste sans consolation

Refrain (bis) :
Hurle le vent
Au-dessus de Késmark
Ma chère amie,
Adieu, Adieu !

Nicolas de Bercheny, le Grand,
Pleure en lui-même
Il a perdu, le pauvre,
Tous ses soldats

Refrain (bis) :
Hurle le vent
Au-dessus de Késmark
Ma chère patrie,
Adieu, Adieu !

=== Decorations ===
Croix de guerre 1914-1918 with one vermeil star (Citation at the orders of the armed forces).

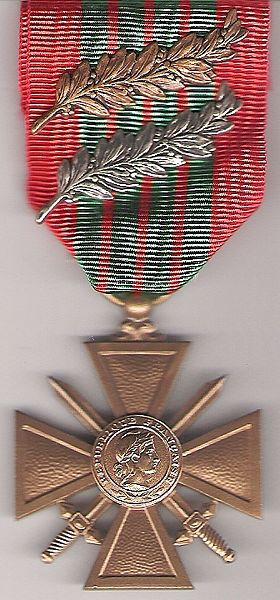
Croix de guerre 1939-1945 with one palm (citation at the orders of the armed forces).

Croix de la Valeur militaire with one palm in 2012 following engagement of the regiment in Afghanistan (Operation Pamir).

=== Honours ===
==== Battle honours ====
- Valmy 1792
- Jemmapes 1792
- Castiglione 1796
- Eylau 1807
- Sebastopol 1855
- La Mortagne 1914
- La Serre 1918
- AFN 1952-1962

== Regimental commanders ==
=== Ancien Régime ===
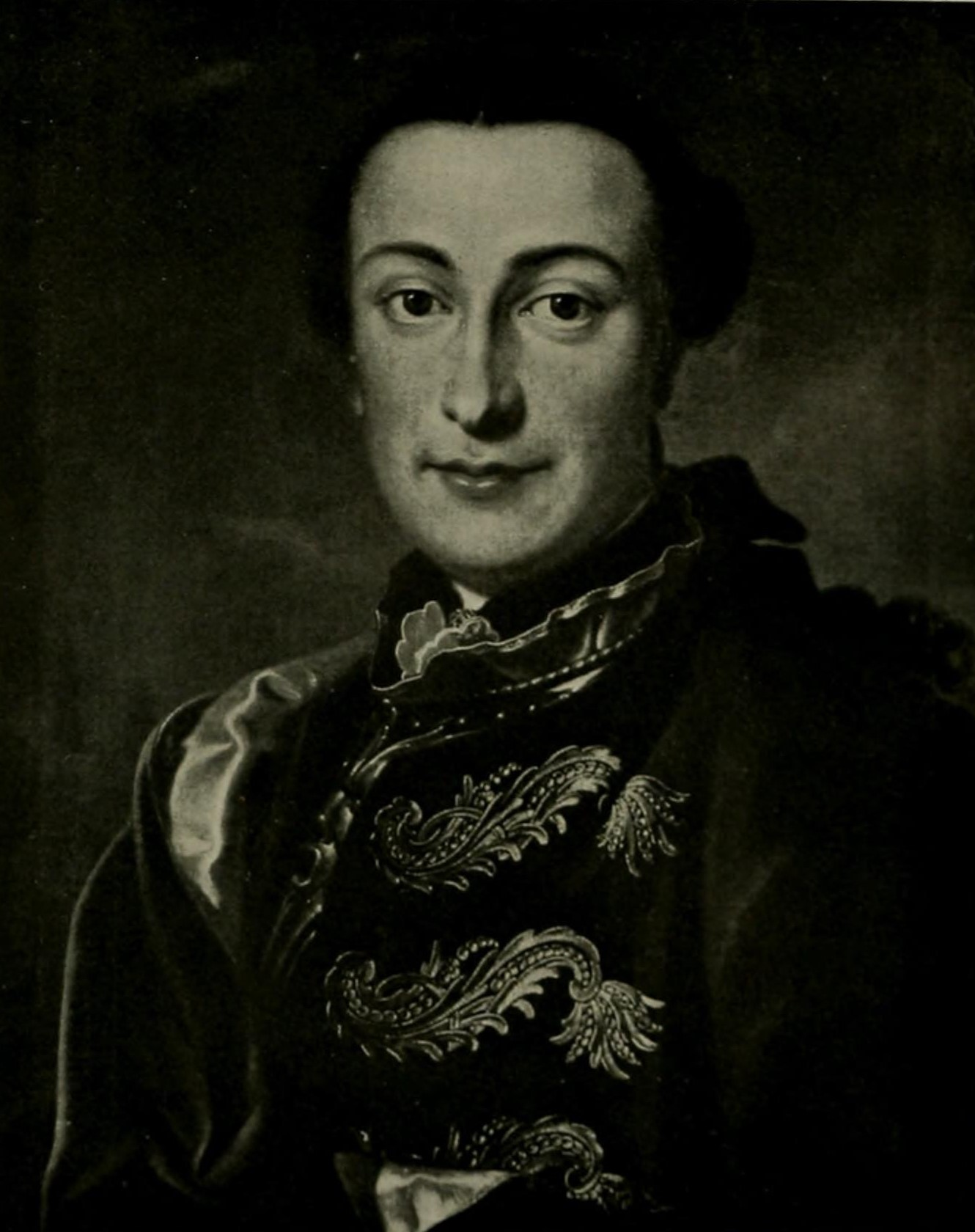
Comte Ladislas de Bercheny

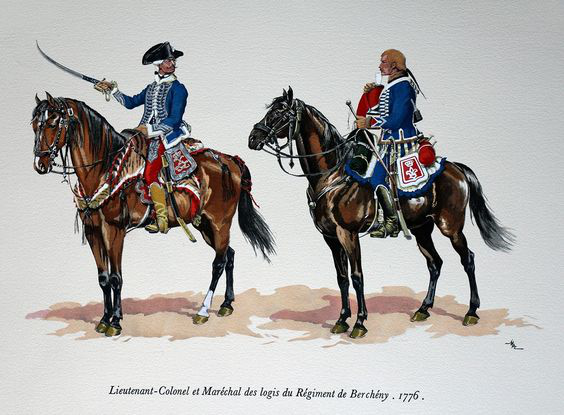
Hussards de Bercheny under the Ancien Regime.

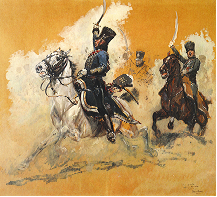
Charge of the 1st Hussars during the First French Empire.

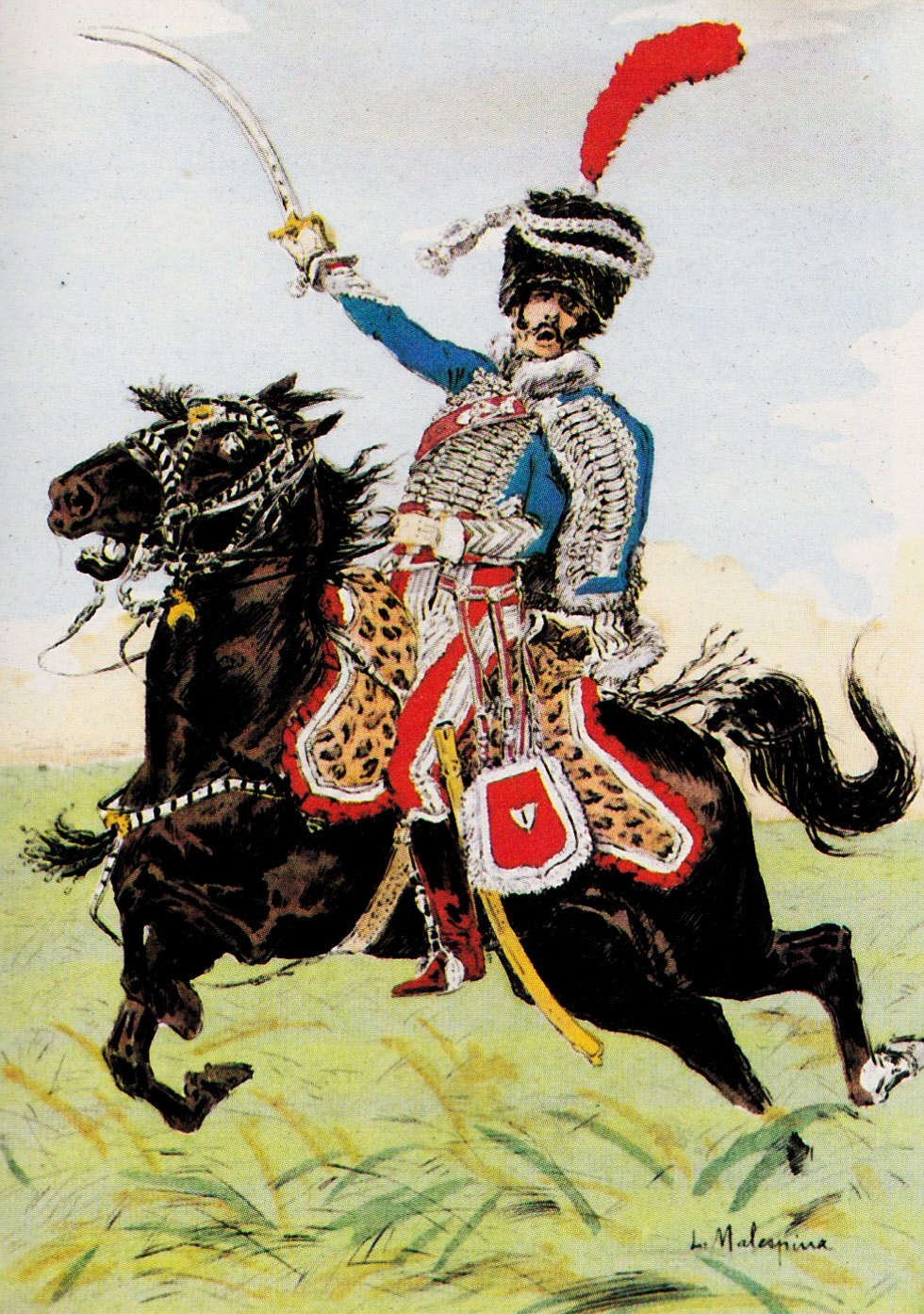
Chef d'escadron of the 1st Hussars mounting the charge. Illustration of Louis-Ferdinand Malespina.

- 1720 : de Bercheny
- 1722 : de Bonnaire
- 1744 : de Nordmann
- 1749 : de Totte
- 1751 : de Bercheny (2), fils du précédent.
- 1762 : de Polleretsky
- 1762 : de Bercheny François Antoine Ladislas (1744-1811), son of the former.
- 1762 : de Sombreuil
- 1771 : de Humbert
- 1776 : de Thumery
- 1785 : de Pange
- 1789 : Henri Roland Lancelot Turpin de Crissé

=== French Revolution and First French Empire ===
- 1792 : Henri Christian Michel de Stengel-Colonel (**)
- 1792 : Joseph Armand Nordman-Colonel
- 1793 : Philippe Glad-Chef de brigade
- 1795 : Louis Jean Charles Bougon-Duclos-Chef de brigade
- 1796 : Antoine Henri de Carowe-Chef de brigade
- 1797 : Joseph-Denis Picard-Chef de brigade (*)
- 1803 : Philippe Augustin Rouvillois-Colonel
- 1807 : Jacques Begougne de Juniac-Colonel
- 1810 : Eugène Antoine François Merlin-Colonel (*)
- 1813 : François Joseph Marie Clary-Colonel
- 1814 : Nicolas Oudinot-Colonel
- 1815 : François Joseph Marie Clary-Colonel

Colonels wounded and killed while commanding the 1st Hussars during that period

- colonel Stengel, wounded April 21, 1796 during the battle of Mondovi, died from his wounds on April 28.
- chef de brigade Bouglon-Duclos, died of fever.
- chef de brigade Carrowe killed during the battle of Rovero on September 6, 1796.
- colonel Rouvillois, wounded on December 19, 1806.
- colonel Juniac, wounded on February 6, 1807.

Officers killed and wounded while serving in the 1st Hussars Regiment between (1805 and 1815)

- Officers killed : 5
- Officers dying from wounds : 6
- Officers wounded : 57

=== First Restoration et Second Restoration ===
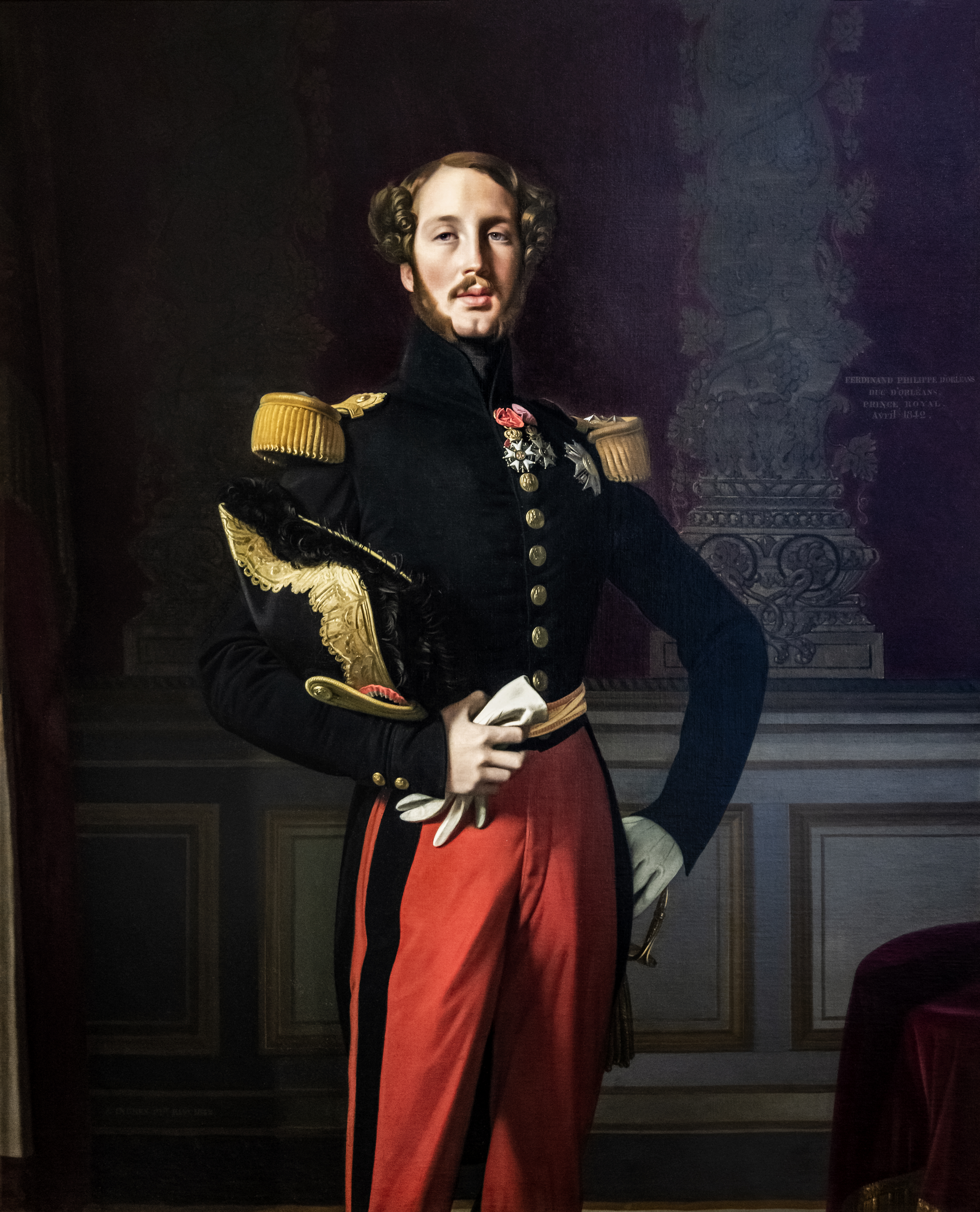
Portrait of the Duke of Orléans, by Jean-Auguste-Dominique Ingres (1842)

- État-major du régiment nearing 1815
  - colonel Auguste-Ambroise-Joselin de Verdière
  - lieutenant-colonel : Armand-Louis, chavalier de l'Orme
  - chefs d'escadrons : M. Vidal de Léry et Jacques-Victor de Suzainnecourt
  - major : Joseph-Antoine, vicomte de Lodin du Mauvoic
  - capitaines adjoint-majors : Pierre de Vigneras et Alexandre Pothée
  - lieutenant-trésorier : François Vial
  - capitaine d'habillement : Jean-Pierre Carmignac
  - sous-lieutenant porte-étendard : Michel-Rémi Renaud
  - aumônier : Jean Didier
  - chirurgien major : Jean-Baptiste Hermaut
  - chirurgien aide-major : Antoine-Claude Marchal, dit Lafontaine
- 1824–1830
  - colonel : Ferdinand-Philippe d'Orléans, duc de Chartres, futur duc d'Orléans

=== 1830-1848 : July Monarchy ===
- 1830–1832 :
  - colonel Royal Prince of France, duc d'Orléans
  - lieutenant-colonel Lanthonnet
  - chef d'escadron de Suremain
  - chef d'escadron Lestocquoy
- 1832–1836 : colonel Joseph Simon Pozac
- 1845 : colonel Berryer

=== Second Empire ===
- 1854 : colonel comte Lion
- 1856 : colonel Moucheton de Gerbrois
- 1864 : colonel de la Jaille
- 1867 : colonel prince de Bauffremont

=== 1870-1914 ===
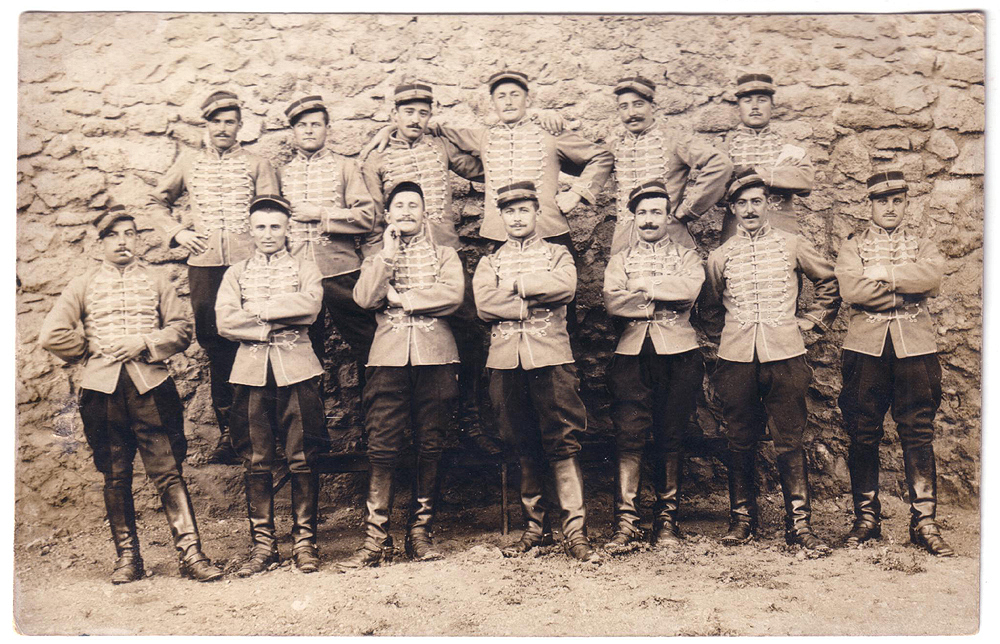
1st Hussar in 1905.

- 1870 : colonel prince de Bauffremont
- 1872 : colonel d'Agoult
- 1884 : colonel Poulard
- 1889 : colonel Buffet
- 1892 : colonel Geslin de Bourgogne
- 1894 : colonel Lageon
- 1897 : colonel de Quinemont
- 1907 : colonel Simon de la Mortière
- 1912 : colonel Renaudeau d'Arc

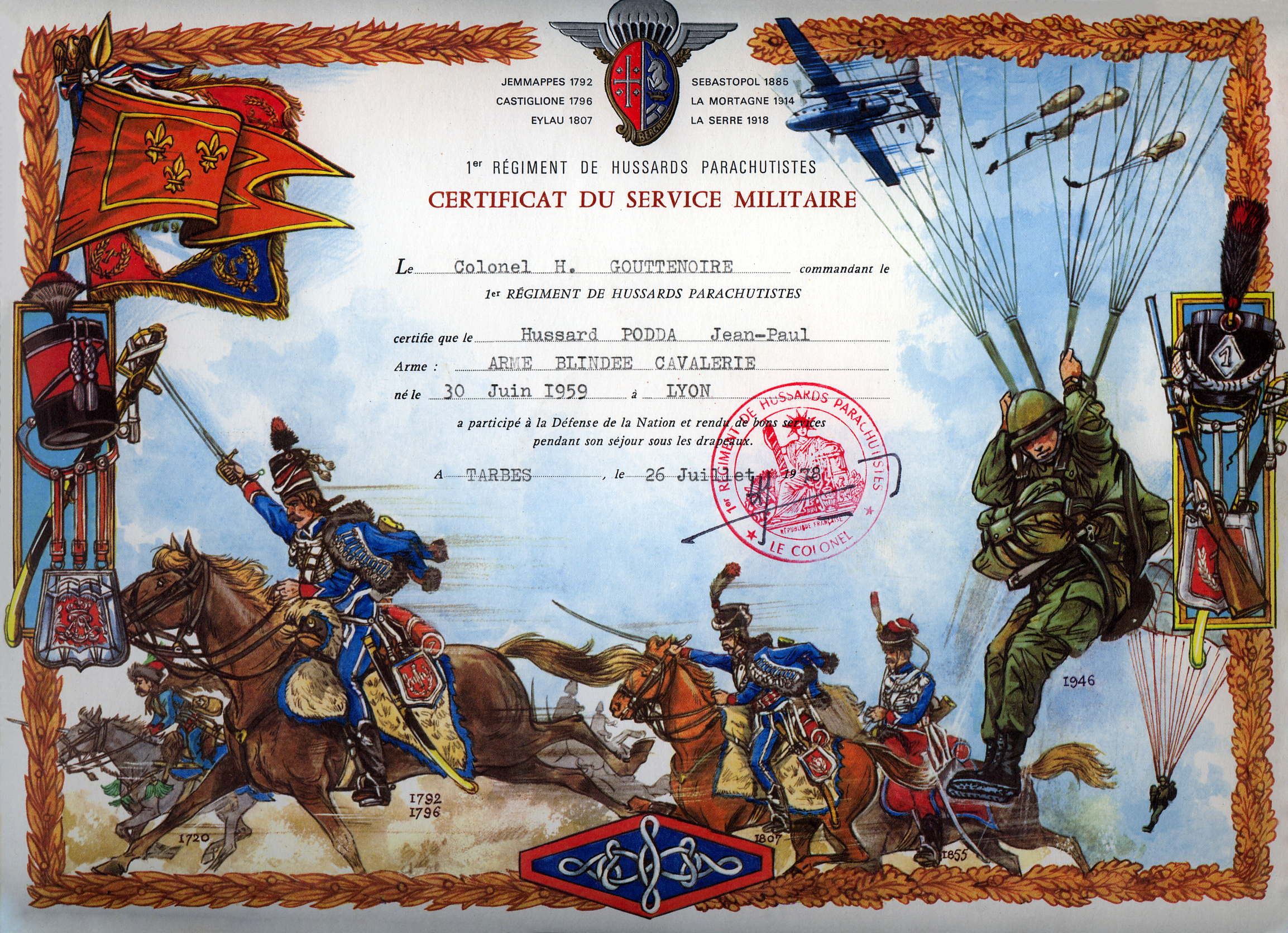
Military certificate service of the 1st Parachute Hussard Regiment, 26 July 1978

=== World War I ===
- 1914 : colonel Leps
- 1914–1918 : colonel d'Amade

=== Interwar period ===
- 1926 : colonel Robert
- 1931 : colonel Aubry de la Noé
- 1932 : colonel Malcor

=== World War II ===
- 1939 : colonel Rabany
- 1940 : colonel de Groulard (wounded in 1940, died from injuries sustained in 1947)

=== From 1945 till present ===
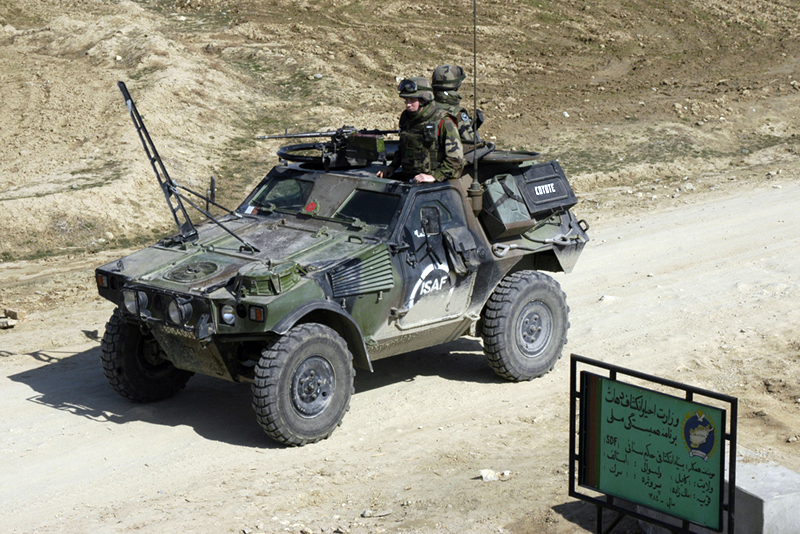
VBL (armoured light vehicle) of the 1st Parachute Hussars Regiment in Afghanistan.

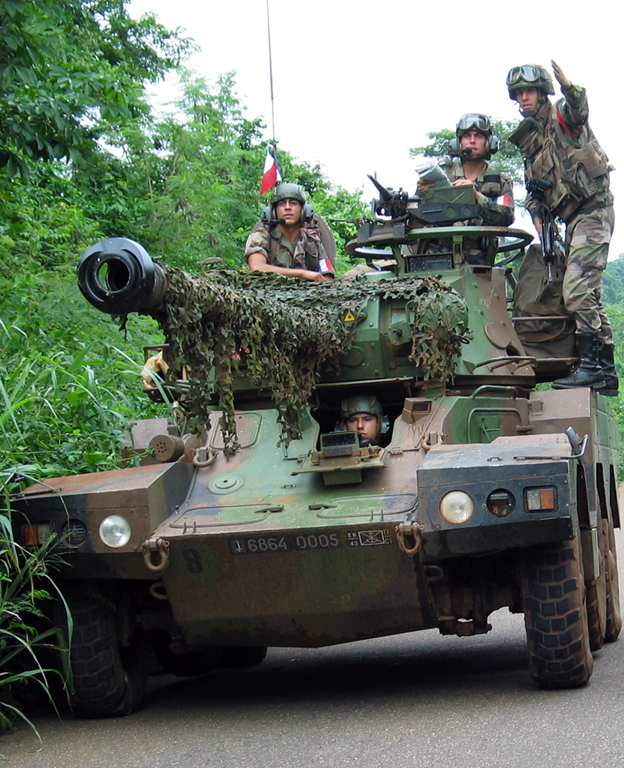
An ERC 90 Sagaie of the 1st Parachute Hussars Regiment in Côte d'Ivoire in 2003.

- 1946–19xx : colonel De Gastines
- 1952–1953: colonel Teyssou
- 1954–1956 : colonel Bertrand de Quénetain**
- 1956–1958 : lieutenant-colonel Hebrard
- 1958–1960 : lieutenant-colonel Jean Compagnon
- 1960–1962 : colonel Gautier
- 1962–1963 : lieutenant-colonel Teule
- 1963–1964 : colonel Donnart
- 1964–1966 : colonel de Boifleury**
- 1966–1968 : colonel Laflaquiere
- 1968–1970 : colonel Jean Combette***
- 1970–1972 : colonel Boissau
- 1972–1974 : colonel Delmotte**
- 1974–1976 : colonel Morel
- 1976–1978 : colonel Gouttenoire***
- 1978–1980 : colonel Berge
- 1980–1982 : colonel Varret
- 1982–1984 : colonel Genest
- 1984–1986 : colonel Gobillard****
- 1986–1988 : colonel d'Astorg
- 1988–1990 : colonel Le Mière***
- 1990–1992 : colonel Valentin****
- 1992–1994 : colonel Hubin
- 1994–1996 : colonel Duhesme
- 1996–1998 : colonel Maes*
- 1998–2000 : colonel Duquesne***
- 2000–2002 : colonel de Bavinchove*** ( CEM ISAF in Afghanistan )
- 2002–2004 : colonel Delort-Laval** ( Director of the War School since August 2011 )** (division since 2012)
- 2004–2006 : colonel de Marisy
- 2006–2008 : colonel de Lapresle*
- 2008–2010 : colonel Villiaumey
- 2010–2012 : colonel Langlade de Montgros
- 2012–2014 : colonel Peltier
- 2014-.... : colonel Aumonier

(*) Officers subsequently promoted to brigade generals.
(**) Officers subsequently promoted to divisional generals
(***)Officers subsequently promoted to corps generals
(****)Officers subsequently promoted to army generals

== Notable Hussars ==
- Ferdinand-Philippe d'Orléans, duc de Chartres then duc d'Orléans, Dauphin de France
- César de Vachon de Belmont-Briançon then captain
- Général Jean-Antoine Marbot
- Général Baron Marcellin Marbot
- Général comte Frédéric Henri Walther (from the rank of a regular soldier -private- to the officer rank of captain)
- Général Nicolas-François Christophe (captain in 1793)
- Louis Bro (1781-1844), soldier, then cavalry general
- Colonel Nicolas Oudinot, son of Empire Marshal Nicolas-Charles Oudinot
- Maurice Dupin de Francueil, first capitain on December 21, 1805, then chef d'escadron on March 21, 1807
- Général Regnaud de Saint-Jean d'Angély (in 1815, to the rank of captain)
- Charles-Marie-Augustin, comte de Goyon (1803-1870), division general, major at 1er hussards le on January 15, 1839
- Charles Louis Schulmeister
- Charles Théodore Ernest de Hédouville (1809-1890), French politician, served in the regiment after 1829.
- Olivier de Germay
- Gaston de Galliffet
- Lieutenant Robert Chezeau

== Gallery ==
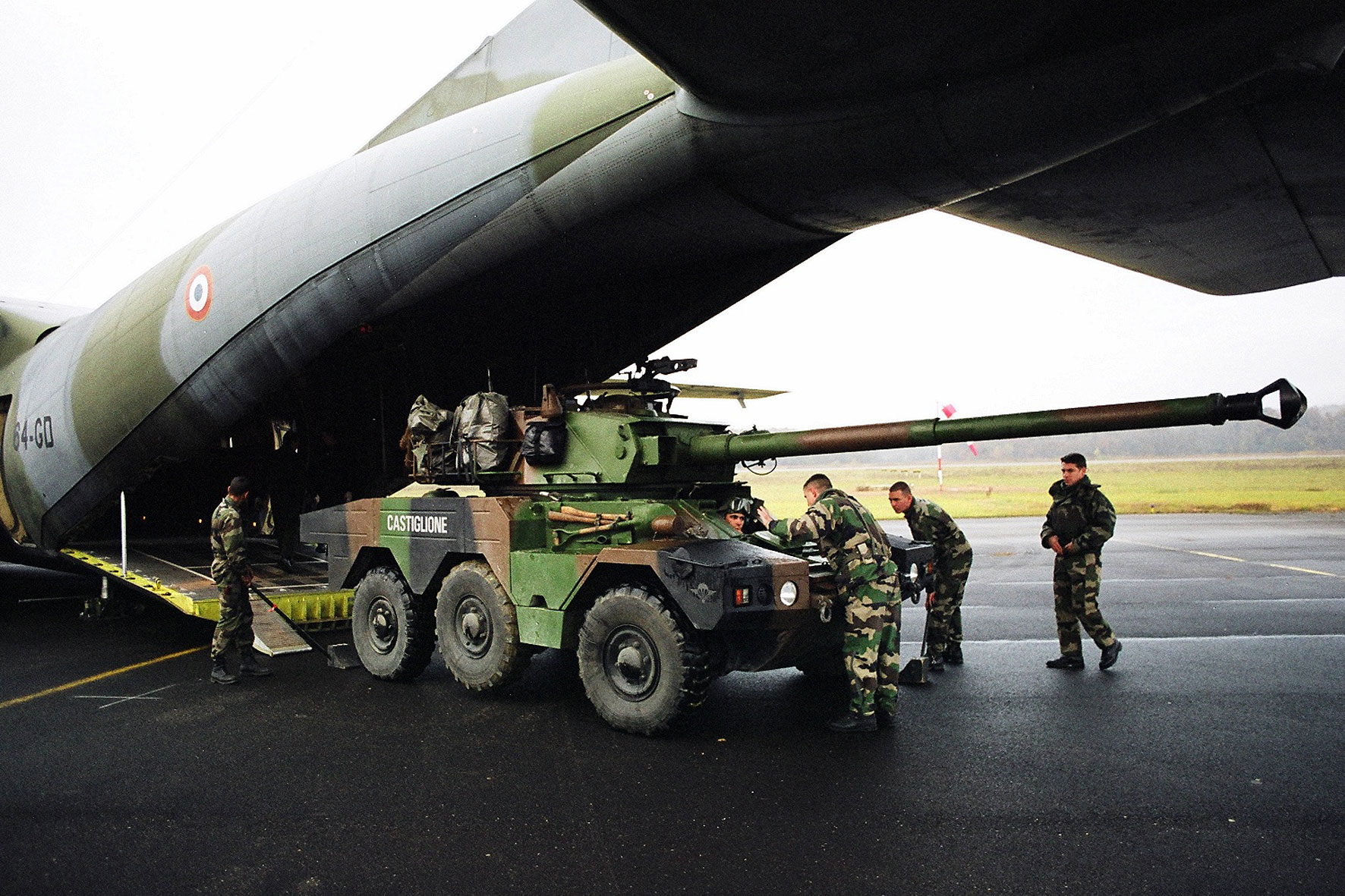
Embarking of ERC 90 Sagaie of the 1st Parachute Hussars Regiment in a C160.

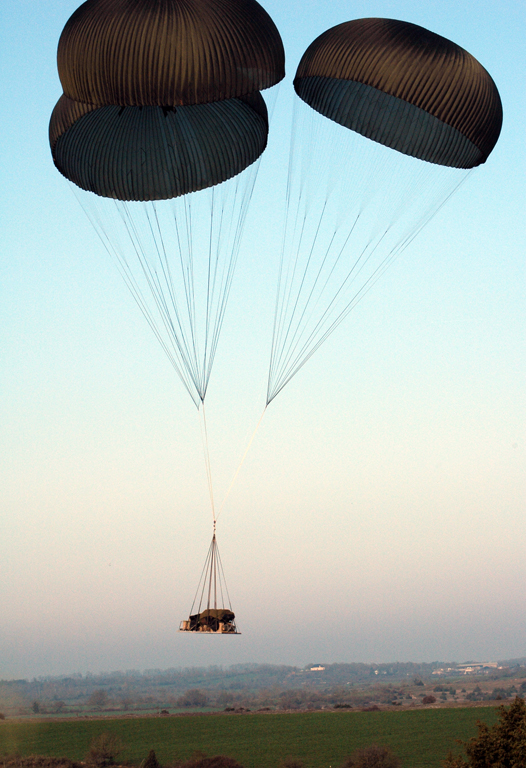
Aérolargage of a VBL of the 1st Parachute Hussars Regiment.

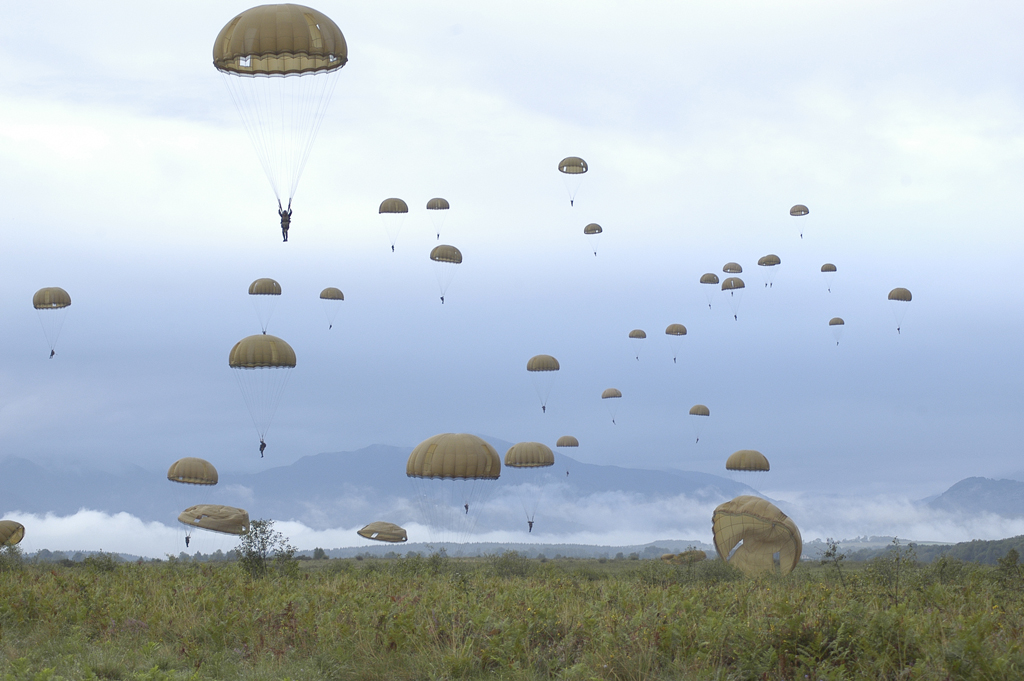
Parachute drop on the Ger zone by the 1^{er} RHP.

== See also ==
- Hussar
