= Uzhhorod Castle =

Extensive citadel on a hill in Uzhhorod, Ukraine

Coordinates: 48°37′18″N 22°18′24″E

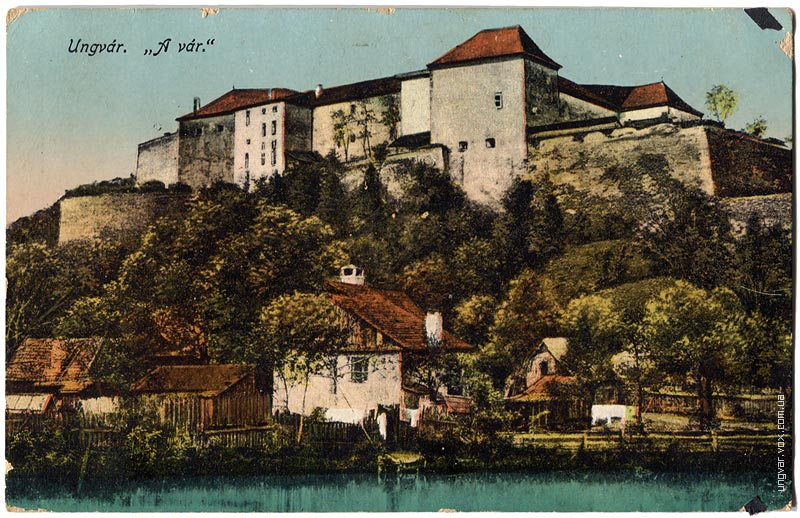
A postcard from 1914 depicting Uzhhorod Castle.

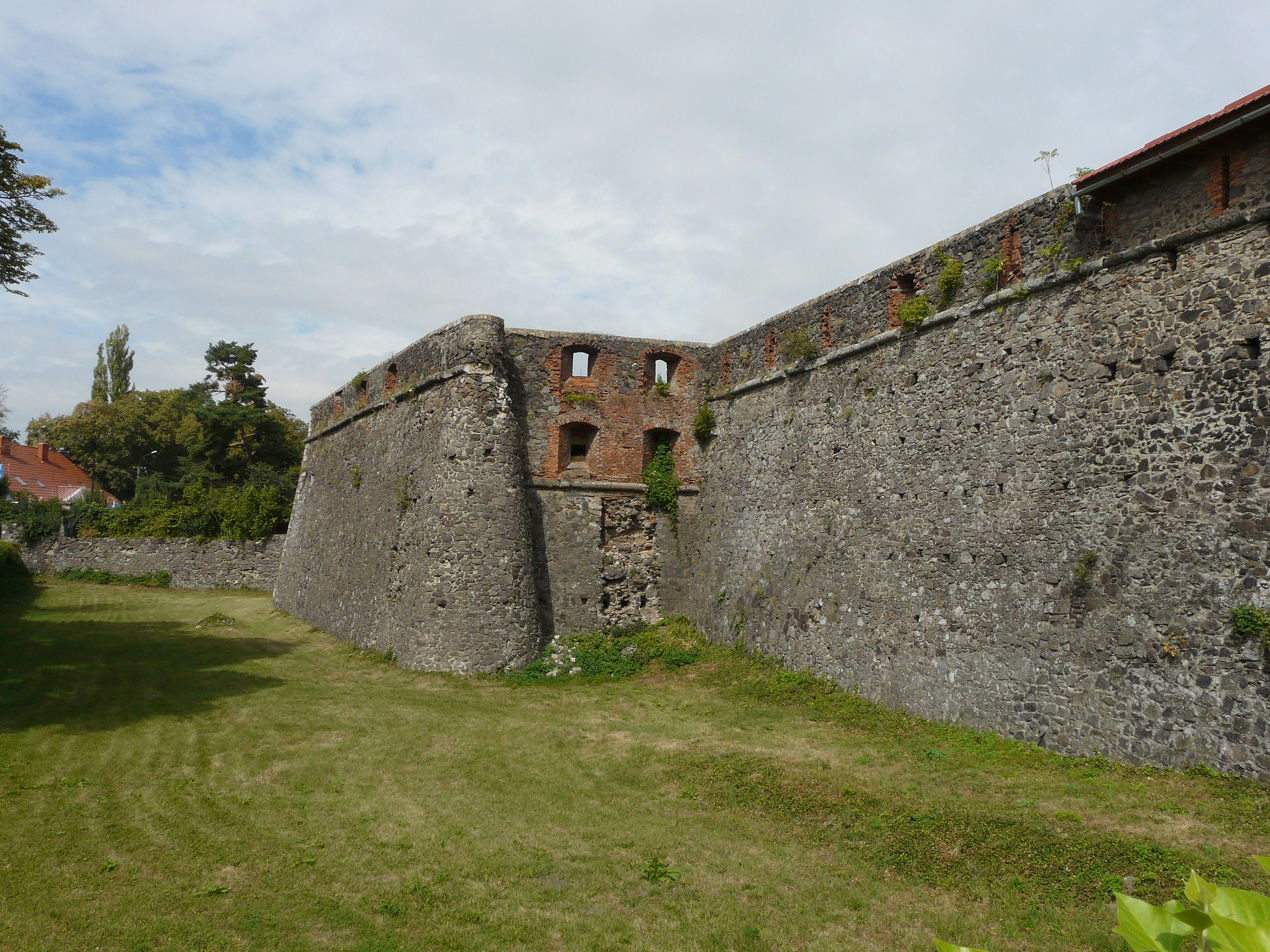
The wall of the Hungarian fort

The Uzhhorod Castle (Ukrainian: Ужгородський замок, romanized: Uzhhorodskyi zamok; Hungarian: Ungvári vár) is an extensive citadel on a hill in Uzhhorod, Ukraine. It was built in a mixture of architectural styles and materials between the 13th and 18th centuries and figured heavily in the history of Hungary. The very name of Uzhhorod/Ungvár refers to the castle, translating as "the Uzh castle".

The earliest stone buildings on the site of the castle may be dated to the 13th century. Charles I of Hungary gave the castle grounds to his Italian supporters from the Drugeth family. They erected a rectangular defensive structure with rhomboid bastions that recalled the castles of South Italy.

The fortification, augmented in the 16th and 17th centuries, underwent numerous sieges (the last one by Francis II Rákóczi in 1703-04) but was never taken. In the 18th century, it was modernised under the supervision of Lemaire, a military engineer from France.

As the male line of the Drugeth family died out in 1691, Kristina Drugeth, heiress to the vast Drugeth dominions, married Count Miklós Bercsényi, making him the third richest man in Hungary. Bercsényi, remembered as a key figure in Rákóczi's War of Independence, resided in the fortified palace within the castle. It was there that he treated with the ambassadors of Peter the Great and Louis XIV concerning the establishment of an anti-Habsburg alliance. In 1711, Bercsényi fled Hungary and his estates were confiscated to the Austrian crown.

As the need for a military stronghold in the area declined with the extension of the Habsburg dominions further to the east, Ungvár Castle was given over to the Ruthenian Greek-Catholic Church which opened a school there. In 1728 and 1879, fire ravaged the castle grounds.

== Gallery ==
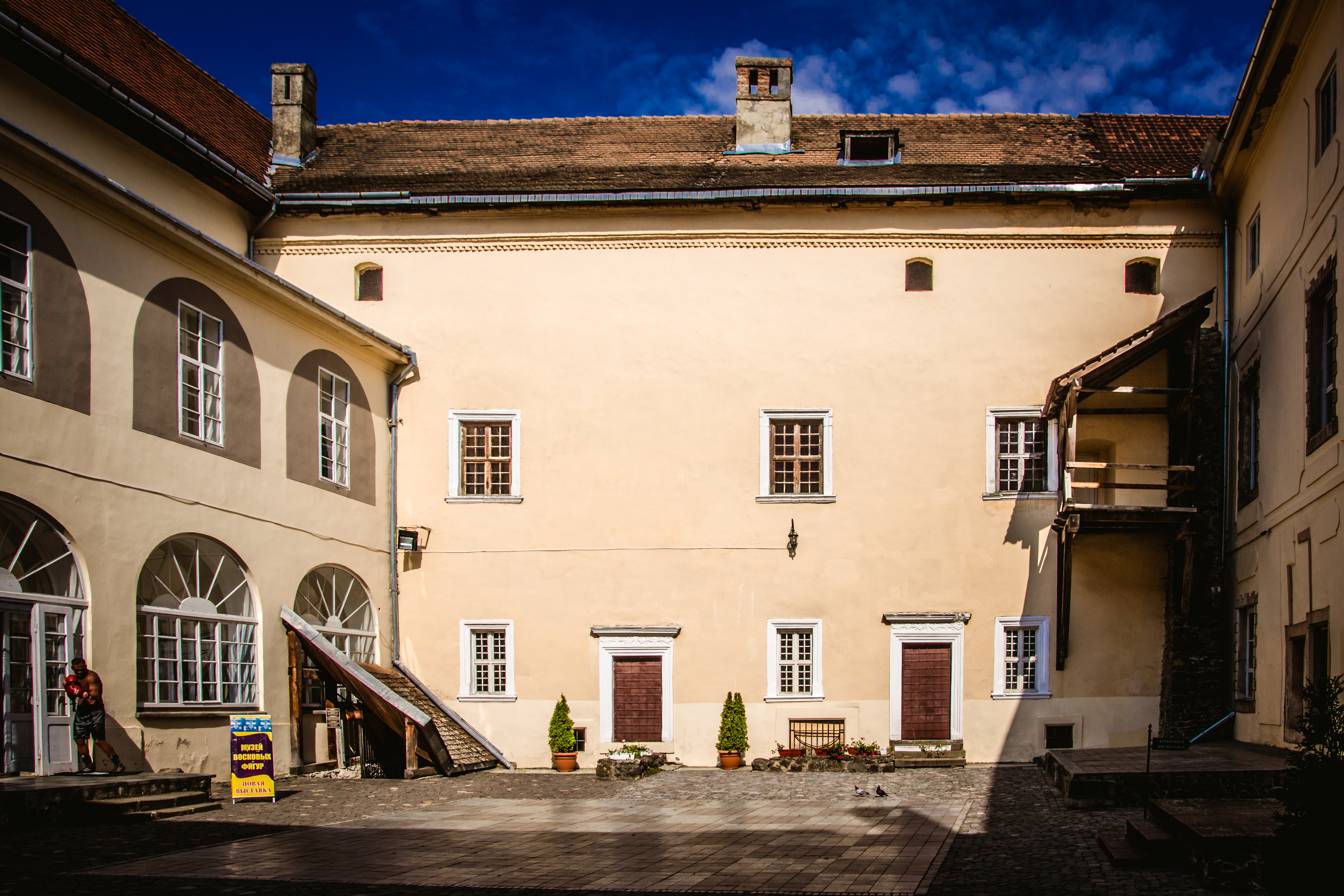

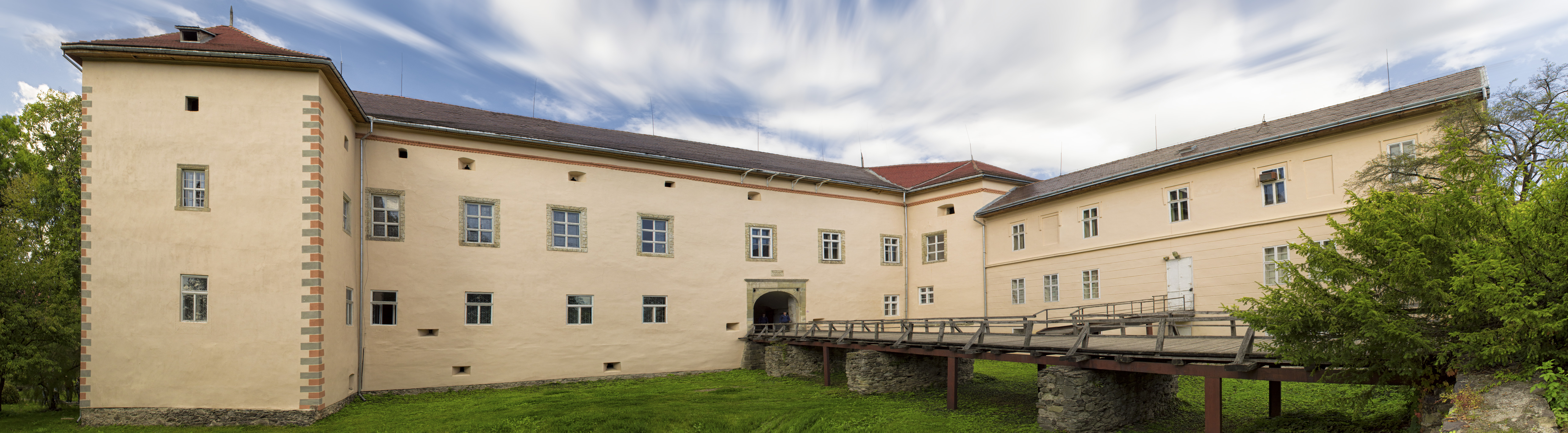

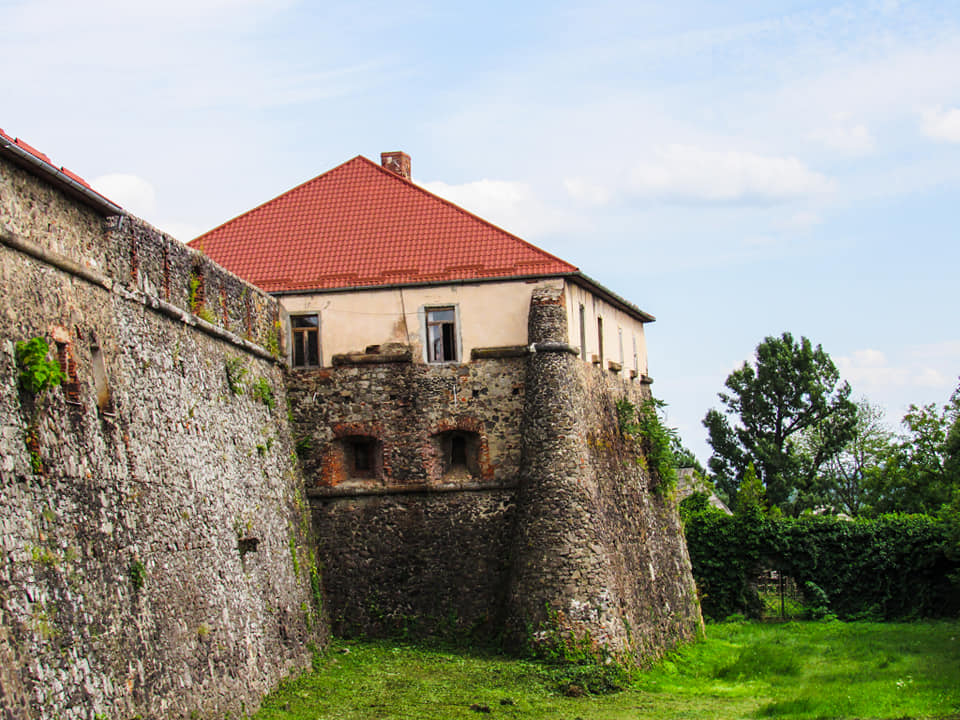

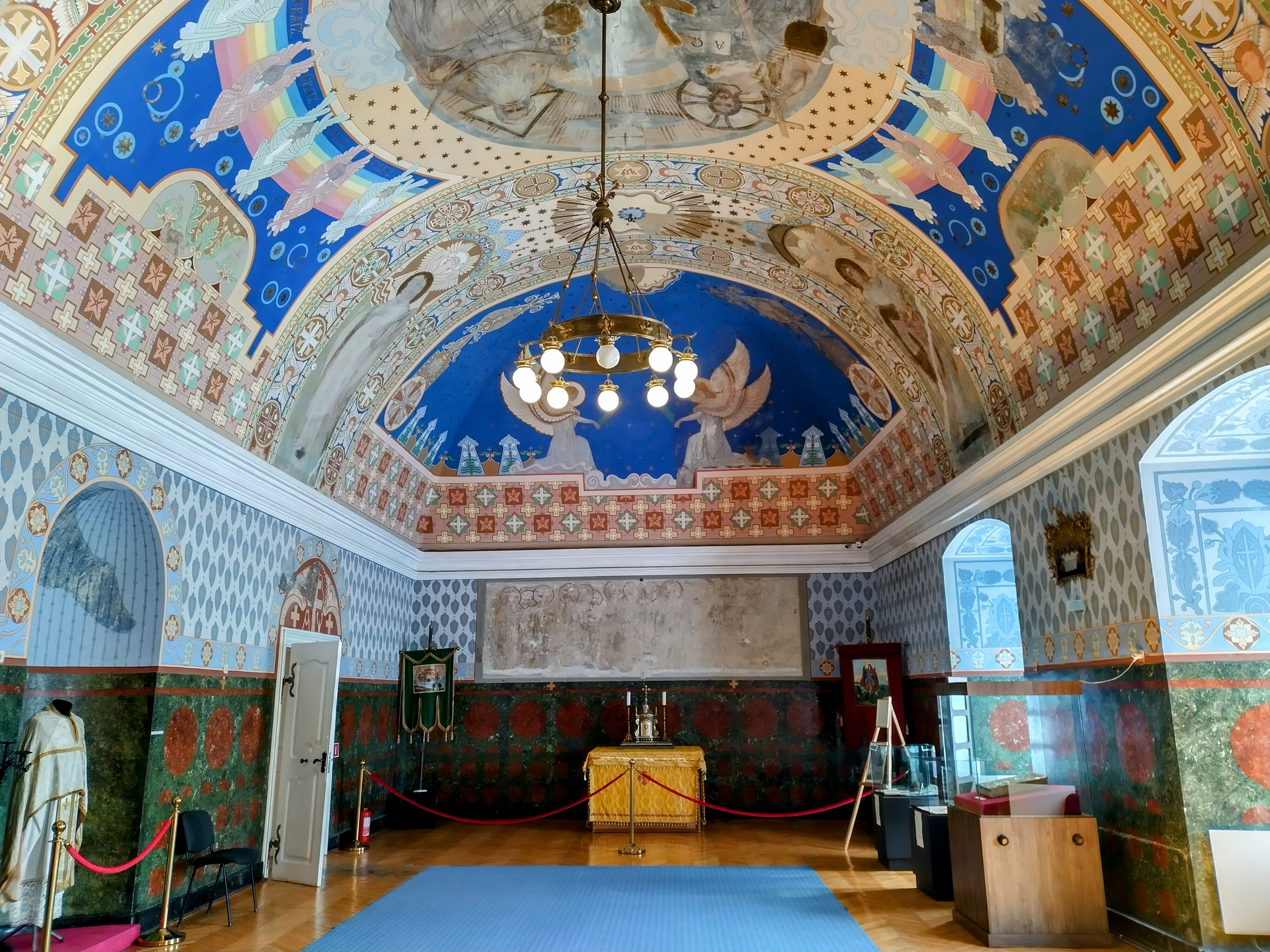

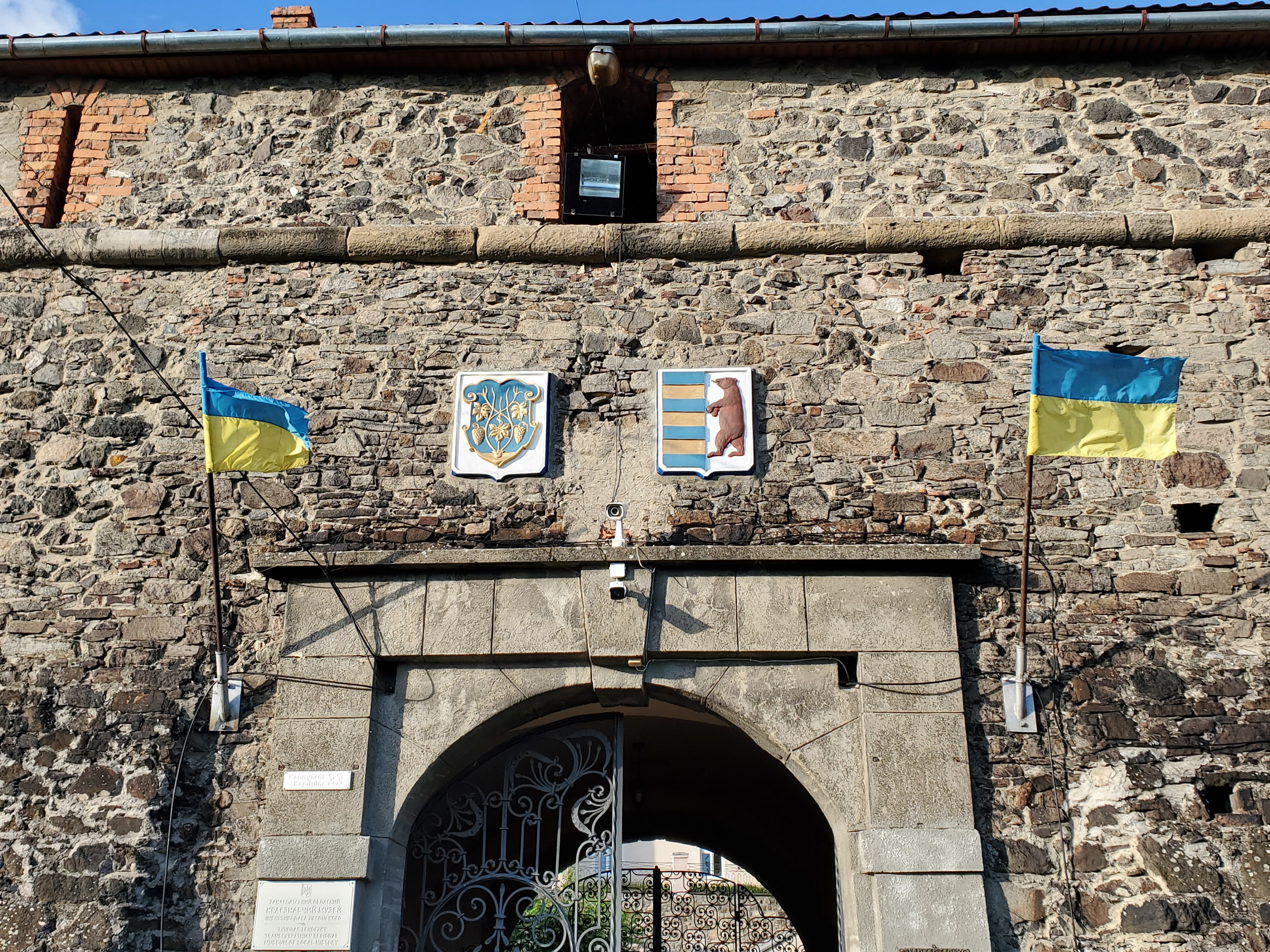
