= Krisztina Csáky =

Hungarian countess

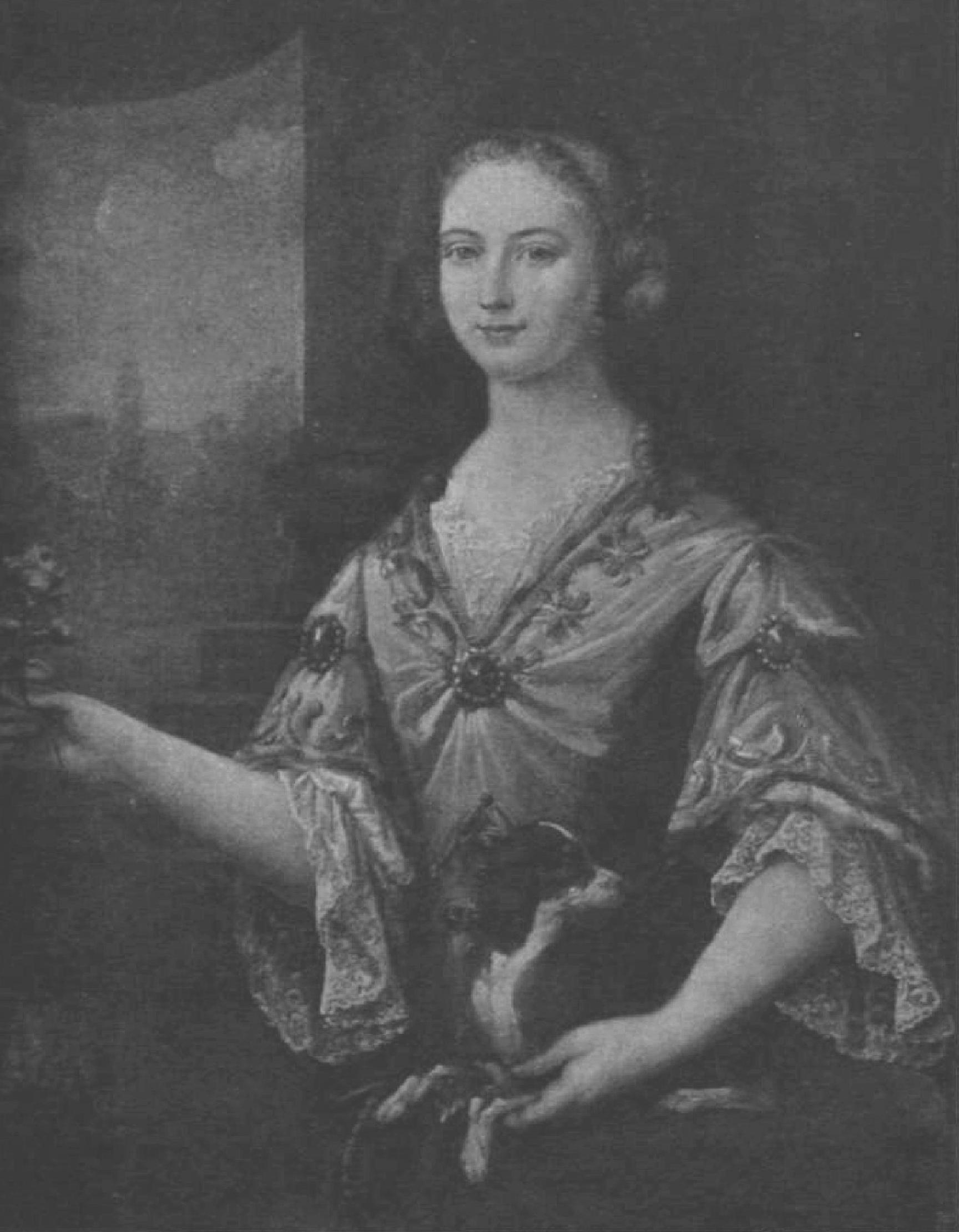
- Portrait in Uzhhorod Castle
- Born: 1654
- Died: 1723 (aged 68–69)
- Occupation: Freedom fighter
- Known for: Rákóczi's War of Independence
- Spouse: Miklós Bercsényi

Krisztina Csáky (1654–1723) was a Hungarian countess. She participated in Rákóczi's War of Independence in 1703–1711.

== Life ==
Born in Szepes as the eldest daughter of Istvan Csáky and Margit Lonay. Her father was Lord Chief Justice and Captain-General of Upper Hungary. Other influential family members included her maternal grandfather Zsigmond Lónyay who had been elected Palatine.

=== First marriage ===
On the 21 Juli 1669, Krisztina was married to the ten year older Sándor Erdődy, High sheriff of Vas County, with whom she had a son Sandor and three daughters Margaretha, Erzsébet and Juliana.

In 1670 when Krisztina was about 17 years of age and pregnant with her first child Sandor, her mother died in childbed. Her father would go on to marry twice more giving her several half-siblings. Erdődy died in 1681

==== Second marriage ====
After the death of her first husband she married sometime after 1682, the half-uncle of her husband the influential nobleman and Nikola/Miklós Drašković/Draskovich/Drachenstein von Trakostjan. From this marriage there was no issue. Krisztinas oldest daughter Margaretha would come to marry her step-brother Paul Franz Karl Draskovich von Trakostjan.

Von Trakostjan died in 1687. His death cause was probably a heart attack, although it was suspected at the time that he had been poisoned for his alleged support of the Magnate conspiracy. The aim of the conspiracy being to oust the Habsburgs from Hungary.

As a widow Krisztina helped arrange the marriages of her children, her son Sandor in 1693 was married the countess Johanna Beatrix von Trauttmansdorff-Weinsberg, who belonged to one of the oldest Austrian noble families.

Although many Hungarian nobles resented the Habsburg rule over Hungary, her new daughter-in-laws father was a chamberlain at the Habsburg court and such connections were crucial.

Her daughter Juliana was married in 1695 to Antal Esterházy de Galántha, a nephew of Paul I, Prince Esterházy. Antals father Ferenc like Krisztinas second husband von Trakostjan had also taken part in the Magnate Conspiracy. Juliana would however die on 28 December 1696 giving birth to a daughter.

==== Third marriage ====
In 1695, she married, for the third time the eleven years younger Count Miklós Bercsényi. After their marriage the couple resided at the Ungvár Castle, which became a center of Western culture in Hungary. Krisztina Csáky became regarded as an ideal model of Hungarian femininity. She helped to raise and educate her step-children Ladislaus and Zsuzsanna.

Bercsényi and his family had fought on the side of the Habsburgs and received accolades and titles from the emperor Leopold I, and his first wife had been the niece of Paul Esterházy who was a strong supporter of the Habsburgs. But in the 1690s, he gradually turned against the absolutism and repressive policies of Emperor Leopold I which was solidified when in 1696, Bercsény met Ferenc Rákóczi who was living nearby at Šariš Castle. Rákóczi also had a family connection to Krisztina, through the fact that his mother Ilona Zrinyi, who was an active participant in the Kuruc uprising against the Habsburgs on the side of her second husband Imre Thököly. Thököly was the maternal uncle of Krisztinas son in law Antal de Esterhazy.

Bolstered by this support for the Kuruc cause Krisztina and her spouse joined forces with Rákóczi in his rebellion against Austria. two of Krisztinas brothers Stefan Csáky and Mihály Csáky (1676–1757) also became Rákóczis generals.

==== Exile ====
After the defeat in 1710, the couple left Hungary, and from 1711 to 1716 they lived in Brezan castle (then part of Poland). In 1718 after the Treaty of Požarevac which saw the cession of several Ottoman territories to the Habsburgs forcing them to move to the Rhodosto (present day Tekirdağ), in the Ottoman Empire, where they lived the rest of their life in exile.

== Death ==
Krizstina died on 23 April 1723 in Tekirdağ, Turkey.

Krizstina was buried in the Saint Benoit Monastery in Istanbul. In 1906 both her and her husbands remains were brought back to Hungary were then interred in the Cathedral of Saint Elizabeth in Košice.
