= Ladislas Ignace de Bercheny =

Hungarian-born soldier and Marshal of France

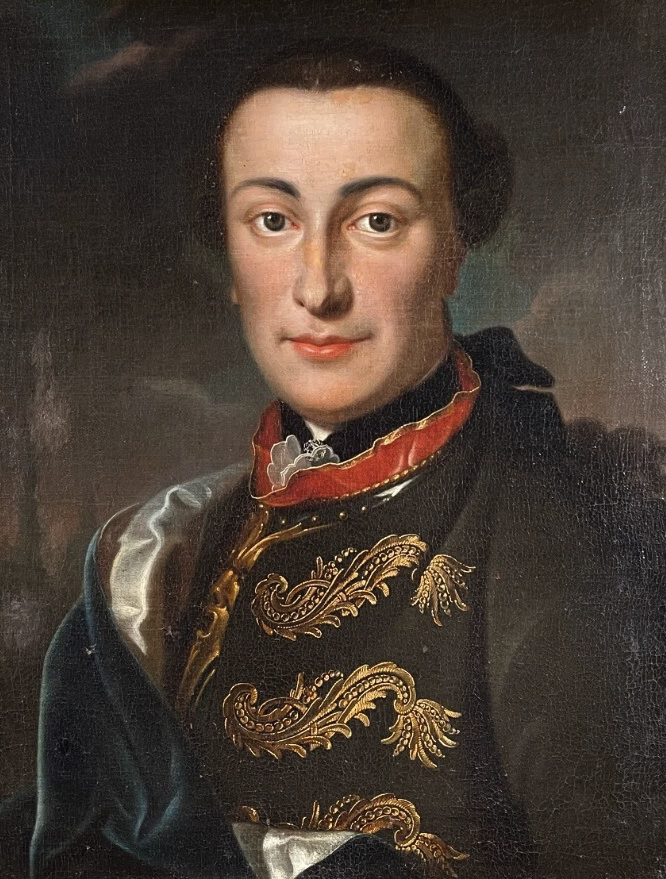
Oil painting on canvas of General Ladislas Ignace de Bercheny Marshal of France by German artist Johann Eberhard Ihle from 1754

Ladislas Ignace de Bercheny (Hungarian: Bercsényi László) (August 3, 1689 in Eperjes, Sáros County, Kingdom of Hungary (today Prešov, Slovakia) – January 9, 1778 in Luzancy, Kingdom of France (today France) was a Hungarian-born soldier who became Marshal of France.

== Life ==
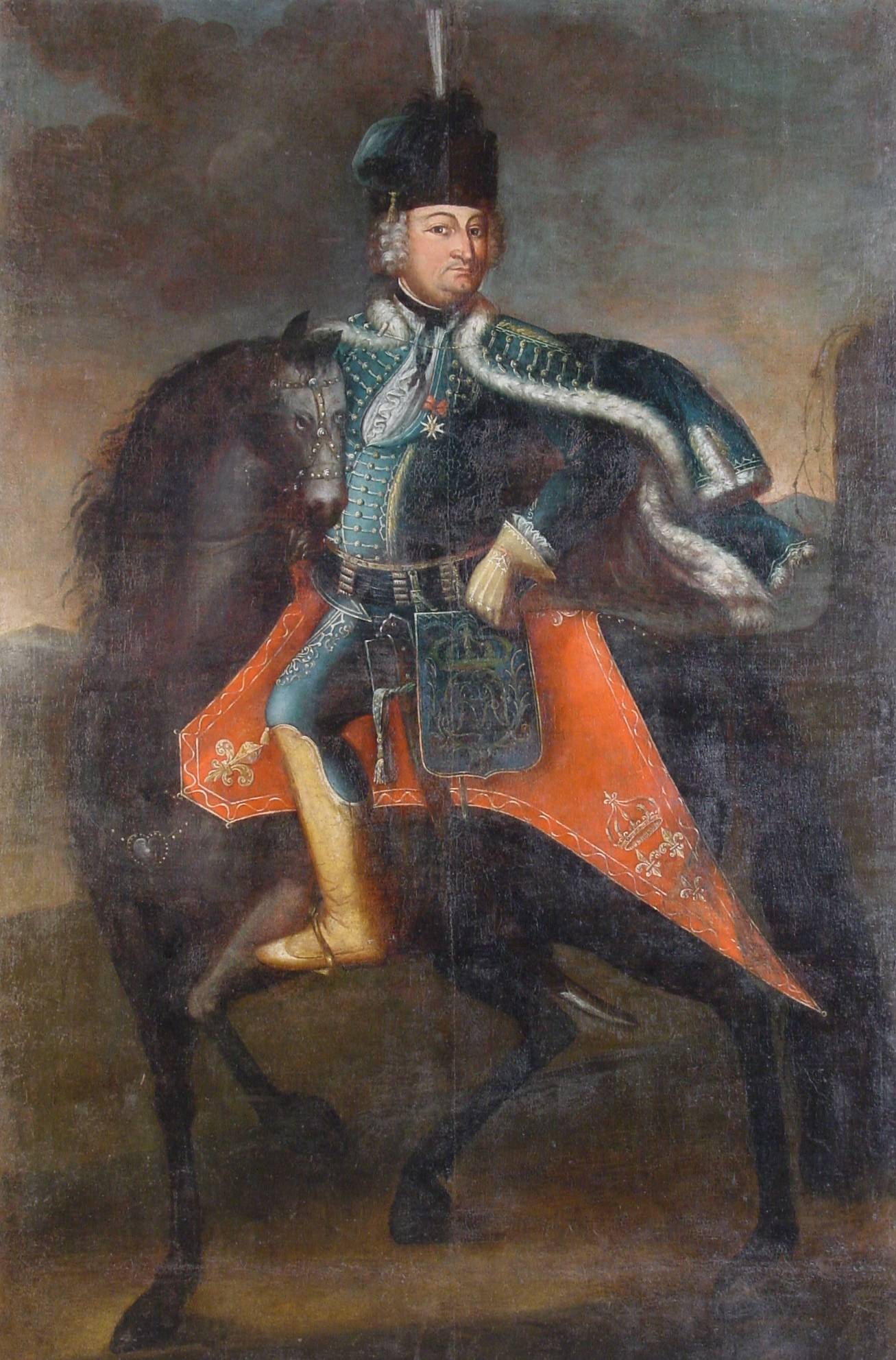
Ladislas Ignace de Bercheny

Ladislas Ignace de Bercheny was born in 1689, the son of Hungarian noble and army commander Miklós Bercsényi, who was a friend of Francis II Rákóczi. Bercheny spent his childhood in Vranov, Brunovce and Tovarníky . After his mother's death in 1691, he lived with relatives in Hlohovec until 1695 when his father remarried to Krisztina Csaky who raised him and his sister at the castle in Užhorod. He was educated at the Jesuit grammar school at the age of ten. After his father fled to Poland in 1701, twelve-year-old Ladislas was transferred to the Jesuit grammar school in Košice.

Bercheny started his military career in the Bodyguard of prince Rákóczi. After the Prince's failure to achieve Hungarian independence in 1711, Bercheny emigrated to France. In 1712, he was named lieutenant-colonel in the Rattky Hussards Regiment, then the only hussar regiment in the French Army. After a year spent at Rákóczi's court-in-exile in Constantinople, Bercheny was promoted mestre de camp (colonel) in the Rattky Regiment in 1719.

Around 1720, Bercheny proposed to recruit new hussars for the Rattky Regiment among the exiled Hungarians in Constantinople. The prospect soon turned into the creation of a new regiment, with Bercheny as his colonel-proprietor. Along with several French and Hungarians officers, Bercheny was able to muster 174 Hungarians by the end of 1722.

Afterwards Bercheny settled permanently in France. He married Anne Catherine Girard, a middle-class girl from Haguenau, who had already given birth to his first son, in 1726. He was made a French subject by letters from the King the same year. Bercheny purchased the lordship and manor of Luzancy, which became his home, in 1729.

The new regiment, known as Bercheny-Houzards, participated in the War of the Polish Succession (1733-1735), during which Bercheny was promoted brigadier. He was further promoted to maréchal de camp (major general) in 1738 and participated in the War of the Austrian Succession, during which he was promoted Lieutenant General, and the Seven Years' War, during which he was made Marshal of France. This final promotion was only honorary, as he retired from active service the same day.

Bercheny died in 1778 in his manor of Luzancy.

== Military History ==
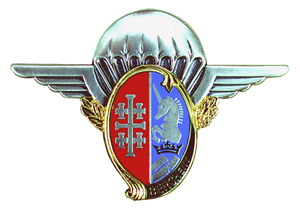
The Regimental insignia of Bercheny Houssards incorporates Bercheny family coat-of-arms.

Bercheny was renowned as an expert on light cavalry and became the first Inspector General of Hussars in 1743, giving him advisory role in officers' nominations and tactical use of units. He is widely known as the Father of French Hussars. His regiment, Bercheny Houzards, became the most ancient hussars regiment in the French Army after the dissolution of the former Rattky regiment in 1756. This regiment is nowadays the 1st Parachute Hussars Regiment, but is still widely known as Bercheny-Houzards.

== Trivia ==
The Hungarian military special forces, 34th László Bercsényi Special Operations Battalion, is named in his honour.

== See also ==
- 1st Parachute Hussar Regiment
- HDF 34th Bercsényi László Special Forces Battalion
