= Francois-Joseph-Marie Clary =

French officer

François Joseph Marie Clary
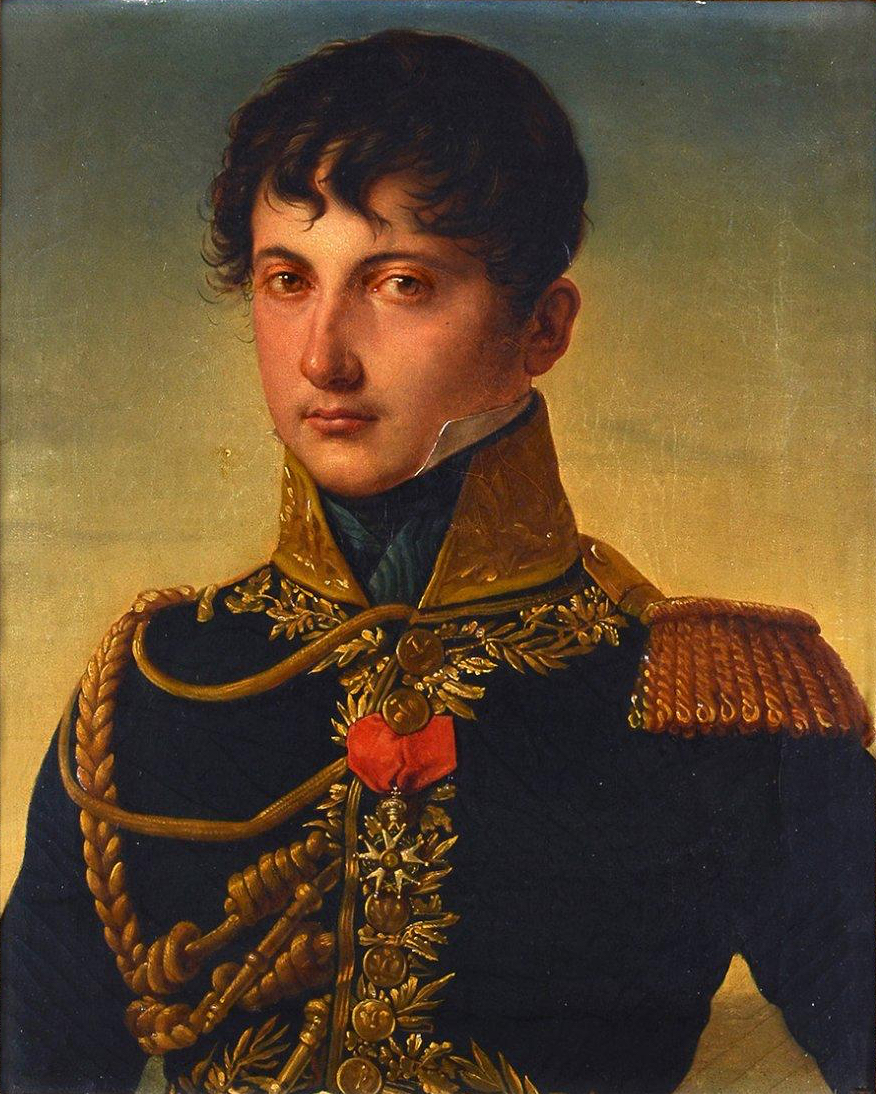
- Born: October 3, 1786; Marseille
- Died: January 27, 1841 (aged 54) Paris
- Buried: Père Lachaise Cemetery 48.860°N 2.396°E

Francois-Joseph-Marie dit Marius Clary (October 3, 1786 in Marseille - January 27, 1841 in Paris) was a French officer who was promoted to the rank of General de Brigade during the Hundred Days in 1815. He was the nephew of Julie Clary and Désirée Clary.
