= Miklós Bercsényi =

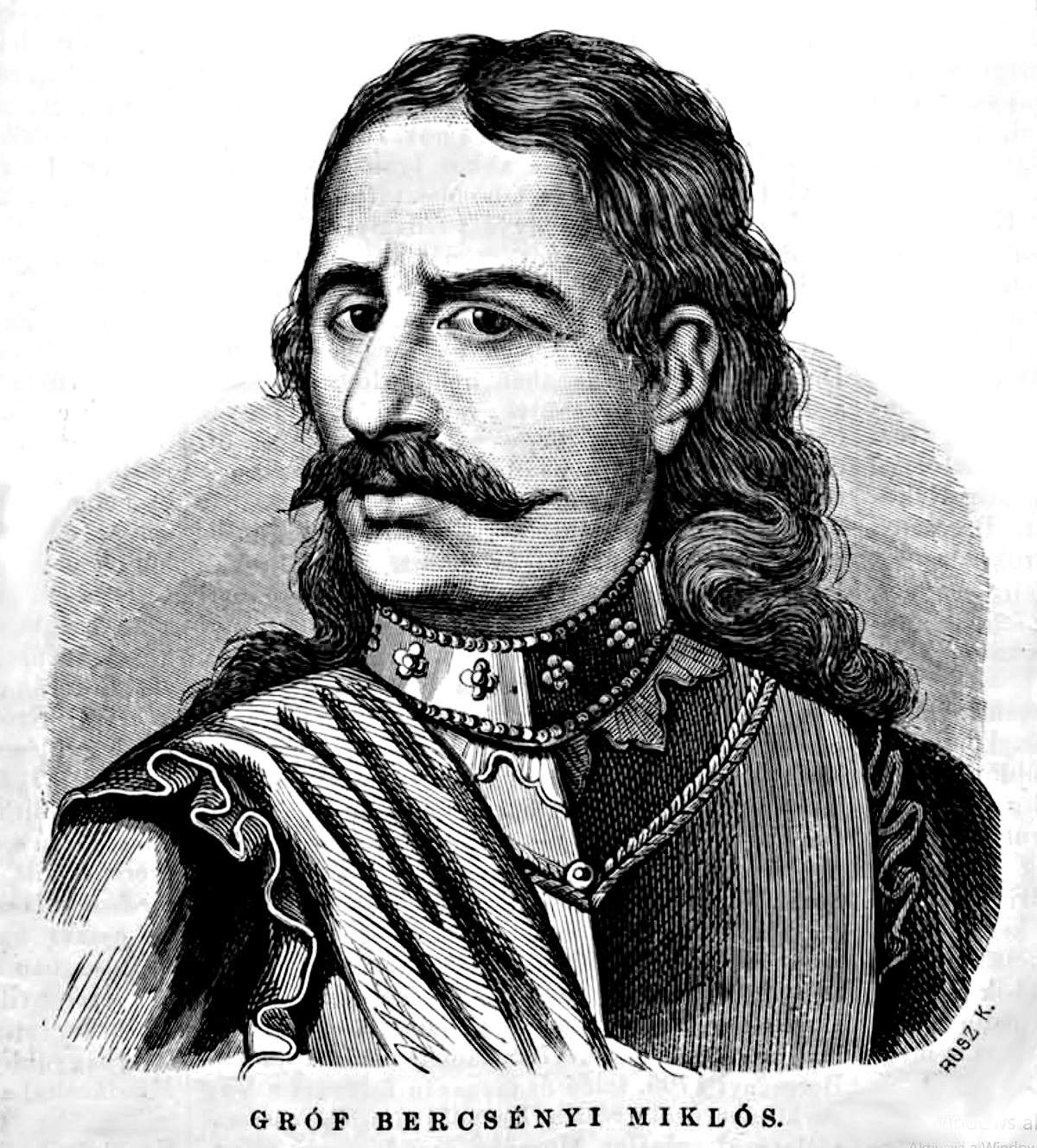
19th century representation of Miklós Bercsényi.

Count Miklós Bercsényi (Hungarian: Székesi gróf Bercsényi Miklós) (Hrádok, Kingdom of Hungary, September 1665 – Tekirdağ, 6 November 1725) was a Hungarian military officer and chief general during Rákóczi's War of Independence (1703–1711).

== Biography ==
He was the son of General Count Miklós Bercsényi (1633–1689) and Countess Maria Elisabeth Katharina von Rechberg and Rothenlöwen (1684–1794). He attended school with the Jesuits, studied philosophy at the University of Nagyszombat, in present-day Slovakia, and completed his training at the court of Palatine of Hungary Paul I, Prince Esterházy.

After the liberation of Vienna, he served in the Imperial Army and participated in the wars against the Turks. Captain of Vágsellye in 1685, he distinguished himself at the Siege of Buda (1686), was appointed Captain-in-Chief of Szeged, and was promoted to the rank of colonel.

Both he and his father received the title of Count on 14 September 1687, from Leopold I, Holy Roman Emperor and King of Hungary.

Miklós Bercsényi became Ispán of Ung County in 1691, Royal advisor and provincial vice-general. Bercsényi was Chief Military Commissioner of Upper Hungary between 1696 and 1698.

The 1690s marked a turning point. The Hungarian nobility increasingly opposed Emperor Leopold's absolutist and repressive policies. Having been friends with Francis II Rákóczi since 1696, they plotted from 1698 to overthrow the Habsburgs and sought support from the French royal court of Louis XIV and that of Charles XII of Sweden.

Following the discovery of the conspiracy of the nobles, Rákóczi was imprisoned in May 1701 and Bercsényi took refuge in Poland where he organized the future uprising. Shortly after, Rákóczi escaped, took refuge in Poland and then led the Hungarian uprising in 1703. Despite his divergent political and military opinions, Bercsényi nonetheless remained the Prince's most loyal advisor. He was put in charge of the uprising’s military operations and became Rákóczi’s deputy in 1707.

After the failure of the uprising, he emigrated to Poland on 21 November 1710 and traveled to the Ottoman Empire in 1716, where he joined the Ottoman army. He fought against the Habsburgs at Orșova, but was defeated. He then joined the Hungarian emigrants at Tekirdağ, where he died in 1725.

=== Marriage and children ===
He first married Krisztina Drughet de Homonna (1655-1691), daughter of György (1633-1661), Governor of Upper Hungary. They had two children :

- Ladislas Ignace de Bercheny (1689-1778), Marshal of France.
- Zsuzsanna (1691–1745), married Count Péter Zichy of Zich and Vázsonykő (1673–1726)

After the death of his first wife, he remarried the influential Countess Krisztina Csáky (1638-1684)
