= 1704 =

1704 in various calendars
- Gregorian calendar: 1704; MDCCIV
- Ab urbe condita: 2457
- Armenian calendar: 1153; ԹՎ ՌՃԾԳ
- Assyrian calendar: 6454
- Balinese saka calendar: 1625–1626
- Bengali calendar: 1110–1111
- Berber calendar: 2654
- English Regnal year: 2 Ann. 1 – 3 Ann. 1
- Buddhist calendar: 2248
- Burmese calendar: 1066
- Byzantine calendar: 7212–7213
- Chinese calendar: 癸未年 (Water Goat); 4401 or 4194 — to — 甲申年 (Wood Monkey); 4402 or 4195
- Coptic calendar: 1420–1421
- Discordian calendar: 2870
- Ethiopian calendar: 1696–1697
- Hebrew calendar: 5464–5465
- Hindu calendars
- Vikram Samvat: 1760–1761
- Shaka Samvat: 1625–1626
- Kali Yuga: 4804–4805
- Holocene calendar: 11704
- Igbo calendar: 704–705
- Iranian calendar: 1082–1083
- Islamic calendar: 1115–1116
- Japanese calendar: Genroku 17 / Hōei 1 (宝永元年)
- Javanese calendar: 1627–1628
- Julian calendar: Gregorian minus 11 days
- Korean calendar: 4037
- Minguo calendar: 208 before ROC 民前208年
- Nanakshahi calendar: 236
- Thai solar calendar: 2246–2247
- Tibetan calendar: ཆུ་མོ་ལུག་ལོ་ (female Water-Sheep); 1830 or 1449 or 677 — to — ཤིང་ཕོ་སྤྲེ་ལོ་ (male Wood-Monkey); 1831 or 1450 or 678

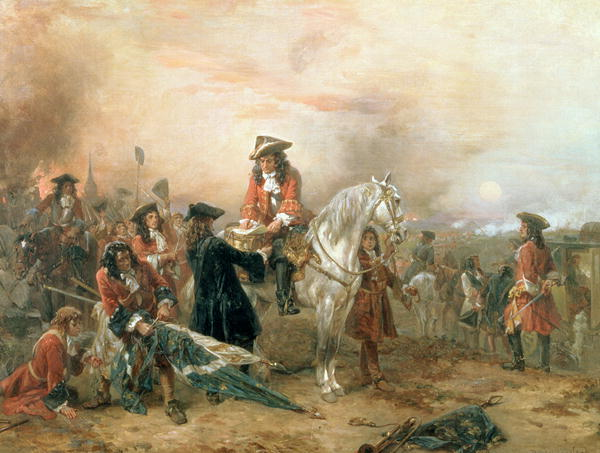
August 13: Battle of Blenheim: Duke of Marlborough leads British to victory over Franco-Bavarian army, saves Grand Alliance

1704 (MDCCIV) was a leap year starting on Tuesday of the Gregorian calendar and a leap year starting on Saturday of the Julian calendar, the 1704th year of the Common Era (CE) and Anno Domini (AD) designations, the 704th year of the 2nd millennium, the 4th year of the 18th century, and the 5th year of the 1700s decade. As of the start of 1704, the Gregorian calendar was 11 days ahead of the Julian calendar, which remained in localized use until 1923.

In the Swedish calendar it was a leap year starting on Friday, one day ahead of the Julian and ten days behind the Gregorian calendar.

== Events ==
=== January–March ===
- January 7 – A partial solar eclipse, Solar Saros 146, is visible in Antarctica.
- January 25–26 – Apalachee massacre: English colonists from the Province of Carolina, and their native allies, stage a series of brutal raids against a largely pacific population of Apalachee, in Spanish Florida.
- February 28 – Establishment of the first school open to African-Americans in New York City by Frenchman Elias Neau.
- February 29 – Raid on Deerfield (Queen Anne's War): French Canadians and Native Americans sack Deerfield, Massachusetts, killing over 50 English colonists.
- February – In America, Mardi Gras is celebrated with the Masque de la Mobile in the capital of Louisiana (New France), Mobile, Alabama.
- March 7 – War of the Spanish Succession: Prince Karl of Habsburg, brother of Joseph I, the Holy Roman Emperor and a pretender to the throne of Spain, arrives in Portugal on the English warship HMS Royal Katherine as part of George Rooke's English fleet sailing into Lisbon.
- March 23 – War of the Spanish Succession: The English Navy ships HMS Kent, HMS Bedford and HMS Antelope intercept two newly-built Spanish warships, Porta Coeli and Santa Teresa off of the coast of Cape Spartel, as the Spaniards attempt to sail into the Strait of Gibraltar. The two Spanish ships are captured after a seven-hour battle and taken toward Lisbon, but the Santa Teresa sinks along the way.

=== April–June ===
- April 21 – Battle of Biskupice: The Hungarians (Kurucs) win a costly victory over the Danes.
- April 24 – The first regular newspaper in the Thirteen Colonies of British North America, The Boston News-Letter, is published.
- May 19–23 – Vigorous Strombolian activity from Mount Vesuvius, Italy is recorded.
- May 28 – Battle of Smolenice: Kuruc rebels defeat the Austrian army and its allies.
- June 2 – Annular solar eclipse is visible from a region of the Southern Ocean between South Africa and Antarctica.
- June 13 – Battle of Koroncó: Austrians and their allies from Denmark, Prussia, Croatia, Germany and Vojvodina defeat the Kurucs.
- June 17 – Total lunar eclipse takes place, Saros series 125.

=== July–September ===
- July – Daniel Defoe documents the Great Storm of 1703 in England, with eyewitness testimonies, in The Storm.
- July 12 – Great Northern War – King Charles XII of Sweden forces the election of his ally Stanisław Leszczyński as King of Poland, in place of Augustus II the Strong.
- August 3 (July 23 Old Style) – War of the Spanish Succession – Gibraltar is captured from Spain, by English and Dutch forces under Sir George Rooke.
- August 7 – Battle of Orford Ness.
- August 13 (August 2 OS) – War of the Spanish Succession – Battle of Blenheim: Allied troops under John Churchill, Earl of Marlborough and Prince Eugene of Savoy defeat the Franco-Bavarian army.
- August 24 (August 13 OS) – War of the Spanish Succession – The French and Anglo-Dutch fleets clash off Málaga, causing heavy casualties on both sides, but without sinking any ships.
- September 8 – War of the Spanish Succession – The Twelfth Siege of Gibraltar by French and Spanish troops begins.
- September 12 – War of the Spanish Succession: The siege of the French-held German town of Landau, by Holy Roman Empire troops under the command of Ludwig Wilhelm von Baden-Baden begins and lasts for more than ten weeks before the French surrender on November 23. During the siege, the Holy Roman Emperor Joseph I visits the area in a newly-developed vehicle, a convertible horse-drawn carriage that has a removable roof. The style of vehicle itself is later called a "landau".
- September 28 – Damat Hasan Pasha, Grand Vizier of the Ottoman Empire, is removed from office by Ottoman Sultan Ahmed III, and replaced by Kalaylikoz Ahmed Pasha.

=== October–December ===
- October 24 – A peace treaty is signed between Prince Ferenc Rákóczi of Transylvania, and representatives of the Holy Roman Emperor, Leopold I at Schemnitz (now Banská Štiavnica, Slovakia)
- October 28 – Great Northern War: The Battle of Poniec takes place as King Charles XII leads Swedish troops in pursuit of the Saxon Army commanded by General Johann von der Schulenburg. The Swedes are forced to retreat despite surrounding the Saxons, and Schulenburg's troops escape.
- November 11 – Twelfth Siege of Gibraltar: A Spanish Bourbon special forces battalion, guided by Simon Susarte, scales the steepest side of the Rock of Gibraltar in an attempt to surprise the British defenders, and kills the English sentries who have been manning the lookout. The attack is foiled the next day when a drummer boy, who was bringing food to the sentries, spots the invaders and raises the alarm.
- November 26 – The inauguration of the newly built Kastelskirken takes place in Copenhagen, Denmark.
- November 27 – Annular solar eclipse is visible through Kazakhstan, Kyrgyzstan, eastern China, Myanmar and northern Philippines.
- December 6 – Battle of Chamkaur: During the Mughal-Sikh Wars, an outnumbered Sikh Khalsa defeats a Mughal army.
- December 25 – The fall of the meteorite of Barcelona is seen and heard over distances up to hundreds of kilometres and is interpreted as a divine sign.

=== Date unknown ===
- Great Northern War: Russian troops under Tsar Peter the Great capture Tartu and Narva.
- The Sultanate of Brunei cedes its north-east territories to the Sultanate of Sulu.
- The lower three counties of the Province of Pennsylvania become the colony of Delaware.
- An earthquake strikes Gondar, Ethiopia.
- Tenerife's earliest recorded volcanic eruption takes place from three fissure emission centres: Siete Fuentes, Fasnia and Arafo.
- A Tale of a Tub, the first major satire by Jonathan Swift (written 1694–1697), is published in London, running through three editions this year.
- Isaac Newton publishes his Opticks. He also predicts that the world will end in 2060.
- The Students' Monument is built in Aiud, Romania.
- Chinese Rites controversy: Rome decrees that Roman ceremonial practice in Latin (not in Chinese) is to be the law for Chinese missions.
- Nerchinsky Zavod is founded in the Nerchinsko-Zavodsky District of Zabaykalsky Krai, Russia by Greek mining engineers.
- Thomas Darley purchases the bay Arabian horse Darley Arabian in Aleppo, Syria, and ships him to stud in England, where he becomes the most important foundation sire of all modern thoroughbred racing bloodstock.
- Giancomo Miraldi observes Martian polar ice caps as "white spots" at the Martian poles.

== Births ==
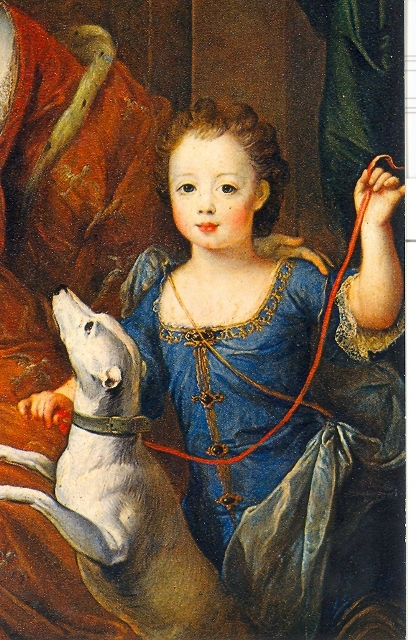
Louis, Hereditary Prince of Lorraine born 28 January

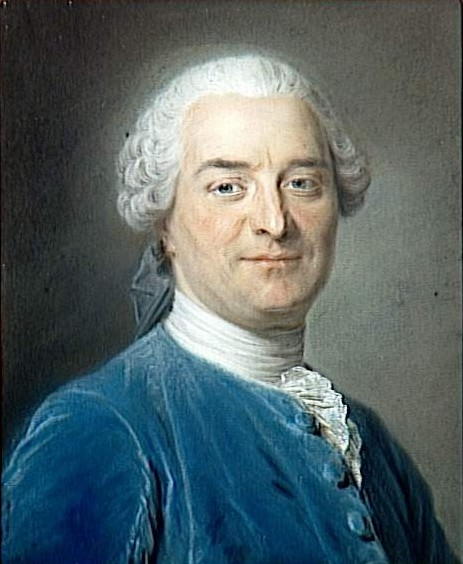
Charles Pinot Duclos born 12 February

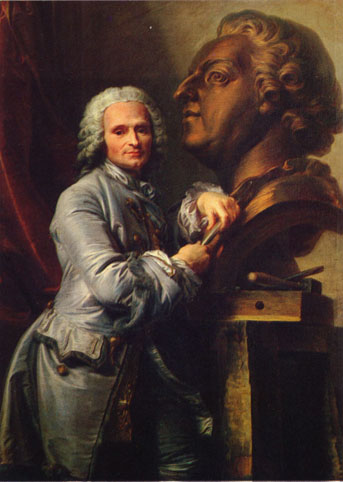
Jean-Baptiste Lemoyne born 15 February

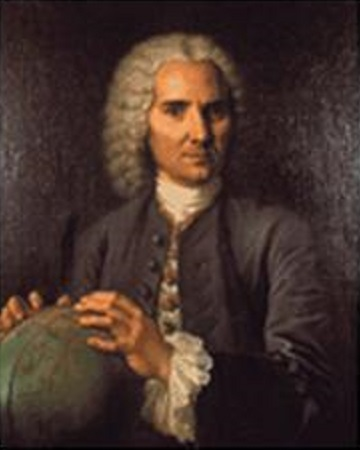
Louis Godin born 28 February

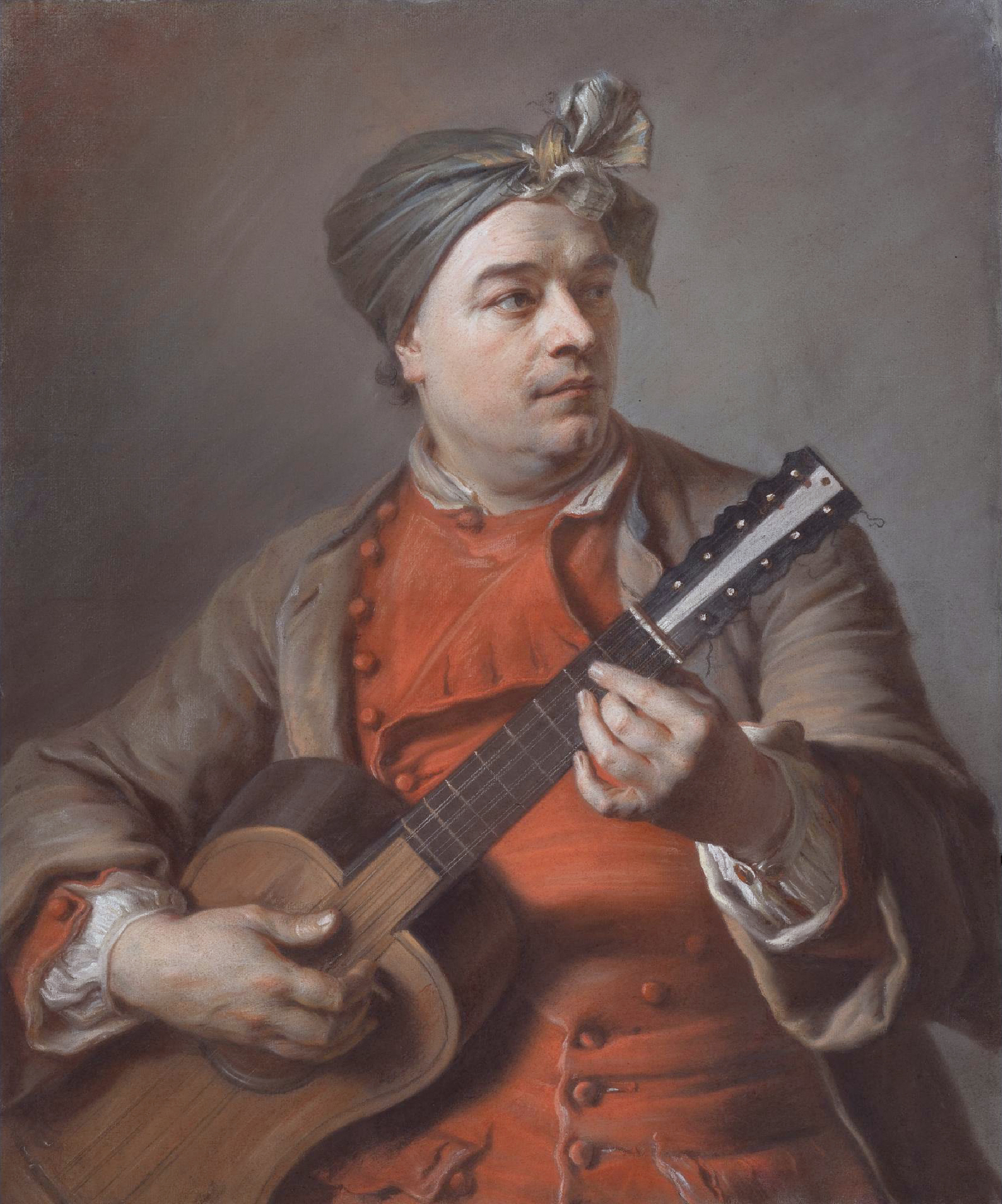
Jacques Dumont le Romain born 10 May

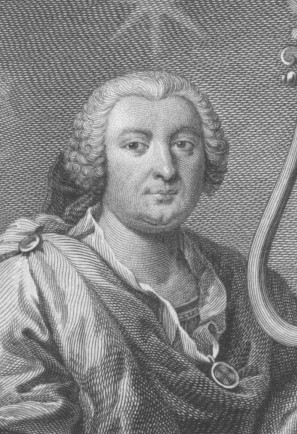
Carlos Seixas born 11 June

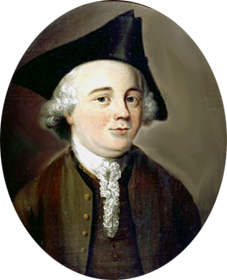
John Kay (flying shuttle) born 17 June

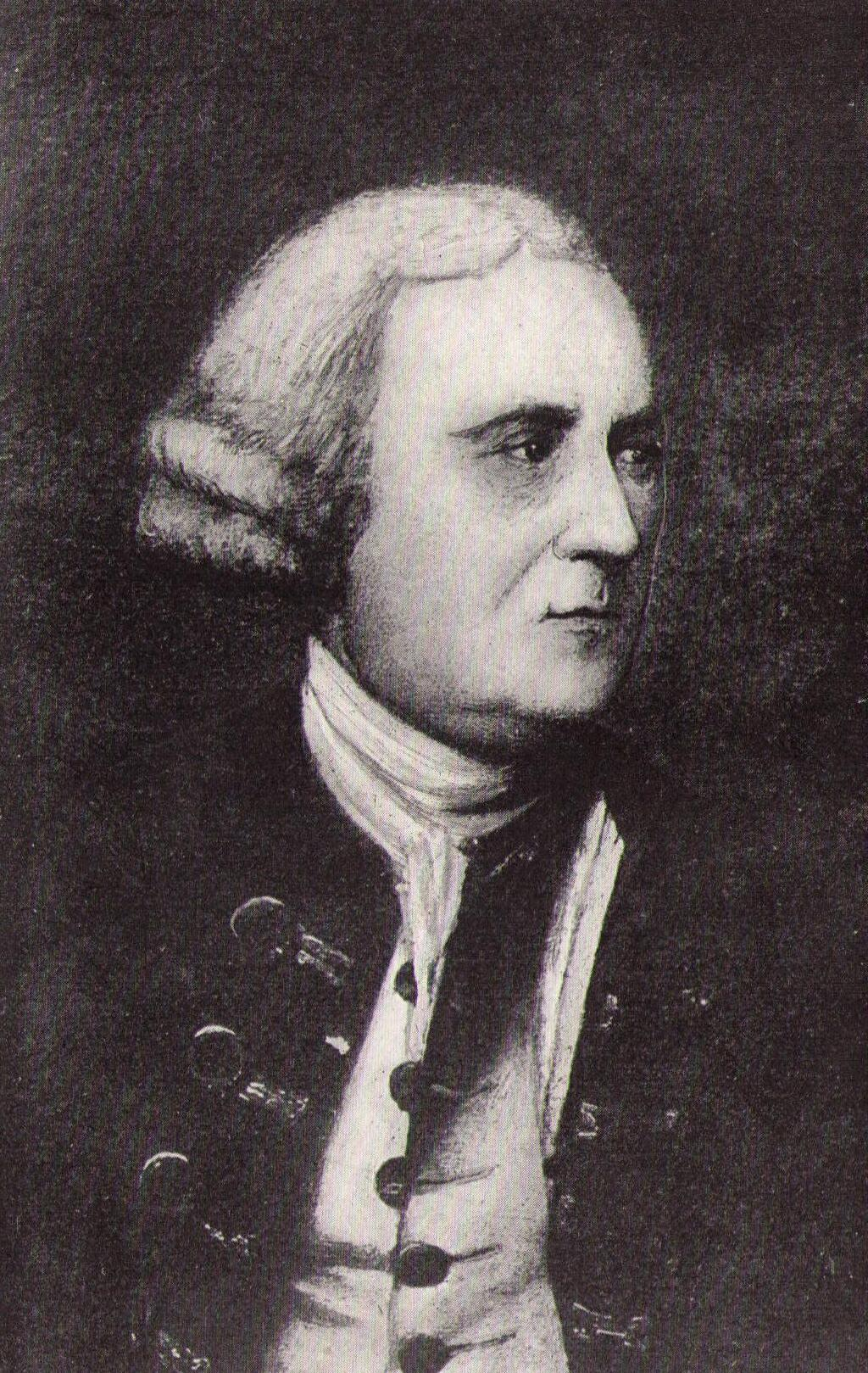
James Gabriel Montresor born 19 November

=== January–March ===
- January 1
  - Soame Jenyns, English writer and Member of Parliament (d. 1787)
  - Thomas Newton, English cleric (d. 1782)
- January 6 – Michael Becher, Bristol-born English slave trader and merchant (d. 1758)
- January 16 – Finnur Jónsson, Icelandic pastor, Bishop of Skálholt from 1754 to 1785 (d. 1789)
- January 28 – Louis, Hereditary Prince of Lorraine (d. 1711)
- January 29 – Francesco Appiani, Italian painter of the late-Baroque period (d. 1792)
- February 4 – Anna Susanne von der Osten, Danish courtier and philanthropist (d. 1773)
- February 5 – Anne Christine of Sulzbach, Princess of Piedmont (d. 1722)
- February 6 – John Mercer, colonial American lawyer (d. 1768)
- February 12
  - Charles Pinot Duclos, French writer (d. 1772)
  - Jan Schreuder, 30th Governor of Zeylan during the Dutch period in Ceylon (d. 1764)
- February 15
  - Aloysius Bellecius, Jesuit ascetic author (d. 1757)
  - Jean-Baptiste Lemoyne, French sculptor who worked in both the rococo and neoclassical style (d. 1778)
- February 17
  - Marie-Madeleine Hachard, French letter writer and abbess of the Ursuline order (d. 1760)
  - Józef Pułaski (d. 1769)
  - Prince John August of Saxe-Gotha-Altenburg, German prince (d. 1767)
- February 24 – Johann Hieronymus Kniphof, German physician and botanist (d. 1763)
- February 28
  - Louis Godin, French astronomer and member of the French Academy of Sciences (d. 1760)
  - Hans Hermann von Katte, Lieutenant of the Prussian Army (d. 1730)
- February 29 – Phillips Payson, American Congregationalist minister for the town of Walpole (d. 1778)
- March 6 – John Ward, 1st Viscount Dudley and Ward (d. 1774)
- March 10 – Josias Lyndon, governor of the Colony of Rhode Island and Providence Plantations (d. 1778)
- March 17 – Lord Charles Cavendish (d. 1783)
- March 21 – Alexander Ferdinand, 3rd Prince of Thurn and Taxis (d. 1773)

=== April–June ===
- April 1 – Amalie von Wallmoden, Countess of Yarmouth, principal mistress of King George II from the mid-1730s (d. 1765)
- April 4 – Andreas Brünniche, Danish portrait painter (d. 1769)
- April 7 – Guillaume-François Berthier, Jesuit professor and writer (d. 1782)
- April 10 – Benjamin Heath, English classical scholar (d. 1766)
- April 13 – Francis North, 1st Earl of Guilford (d. 1790)
- April 17
  - Paolo Girolamo Besozzi, Italian oboe virtuoso and bassoonist (d. 1778)
  - Jean-Baptiste Chermanne, architect and businessman active in the Southern Netherlands and the Principality of Liège (d. 1770)
- April 21 – Gabriel Manigault, American merchant (d. 1781)
- April 29 – Arthur Denny, Irish politician (d. 1742)
- April 30 – Jean Adam, Scottish poet from the labouring classes (d. 1765)
- May 6 – Fath Muhammad, general of Mysore and the father of Hyder Ali (d. 1725)
- May 7 – Carl Heinrich Graun, German composer and tenor (d. 1759)
- May 8 – Gaspare Testone, Italian painter and architect (d. 1801)
- May 10 – Jacques Dumont le Romain, French history and portrait painter (d. 1781)
- June 1 – Johann Baptist Straub (d. 1784)
- June 4 – Benjamin Huntsman, English inventor and manufacturer of cast or crucible steel (d. 1776)
- June 11 – Carlos Seixas, Portuguese composer (d. 1742)
- June 16 – Edward Ward, 9th Baron Dudley (d. 1731)
- June 17 – John Kay, inventor of the flying shuttle (d. 1780)
- June 22 – John Taylor, English classical scholar (d. 1766)
- June 24
  - Jean-Baptiste de Boyer, Marquis d'Argens, French writer (d. 1771)
  - John Ward, English actor and theatre manager (d. 1773)
- June 29 – Azad Bilgrami, scholar of Arabic (d. 1786)

=== July–September ===
- July 4 – Michel de Sallaberry (d. 1768)
- July 15 – August Gottlieb Spangenberg, German theologian and minister (d. 1792)
- July 31 – Gabriel Cramer, Swiss mathematician (d. 1752)
- August 3
  - Catherine-Nicole Lemaure, French operatic soprano (d. 1786)
  - Benjamin Shoemaker, colonial Pennsylvania Quaker (d. 1767)
- August 5 – William Allen, wealthy merchant (d. 1780)
- August 11 – Karl August von Bergen (d. 1759)
- August 12 – Countess Caroline of Nassau-Saarbrücken (d. 1774)
- August 13 – Alexis Fontaine des Bertins, French mathematician (d. 1771)
- August 21 – Johann Georg, Chevalier de Saxe (d. 1774)
- August 26
  - Marie-Anne Barbel, French-Canadian Businesswomen who lived in New France (d. 1793)
  - Guy Michel de Durfort, French general and nobleman (d. 1773)
  - Pierre L'Enfant, painter (d. 1787)
- September 3 – Joseph de Jussieu, French botanist and explorer (d. 1779)
- September 5 – Maurice Quentin de La Tour, French Rococo portraitist, working primarily with pastels (d. 1788)
- September 7 – John Hope, 2nd Earl of Hopetoun, son of Charles Hope (d. 1781)
- September 12 – Stephen Fox-Strangways, 1st Earl of Ilchester (d. 1776)
- September 20 – Isaac Basire, engraver, first in a family line of prolific and well-respected engravers (d. 1768)
- September 22 – Jacques de Lafontaine de Belcour, French entrepreneur with business ventures in New France (now Quebec) (d. 1765)
- September 24 – Karl August, Prince of Waldeck and Pyrmont (d. 1763)
- September 26 – William French, Anglican priest (d. 1785)
- September 29 – Johann Friedrich Cartheuser, German physician and naturalist (d. 1777)

=== October–December ===
- October 29 – John Byng, British admiral (d. 1757)
- November 1
  - Erland Broman, Swedish official and noble (d. 1757)
  - Paul Daniel Longolius, German encyclopedist (d. 1779)
- November 5
  - Benjamin Goldthwait, British army officer in King George's War and the French and Indian War (d. 1761)
  - Samuel Pegge, English antiquary and clergyman (d. 1796)
- November 6 – Willem Bentinck van Rhoon, Dutch nobleman and politician (d. 1774)
- November 7 – Charles Gautier de Vinfrais, French officer of the Royal venery (d. 1797)
- November 11 – Adriaan van Royen, Dutch botanist (d. 1779)
- November 13 – Charles Hamilton, MP (d. 1786)
- November 16 – Giacopo Belgrado (d. 1789)
- November 19
  - James Gabriel Montresor, British military engineer (d. 1776)
  - Richard Pococke (d. 1765)
- November 28 – Jacob Mossel (d. 1761)
- December 8 – Anton de Haen, Austrian physician of Dutch ancestry (d. 1776)
- December 12
  - Peter Kemble, American politician from the colonial period, President of the New Jersey Provincial Council from 1745 to 1776 (d. 1789)
  - Sir Edward Knatchbull, 7th Baronet (d. 1789)
- December 14 – Jacob von Eggers, Military engineer (d. 1773)
- December 26 – Lord George Beauclerk, British Army officer (d. 1768)
- December 29 – Martha Daniell Logan, American botanist (d. 1779)
- December 31 – Carl Gotthelf Gerlach, German organist (d. 1761)

== Deaths ==
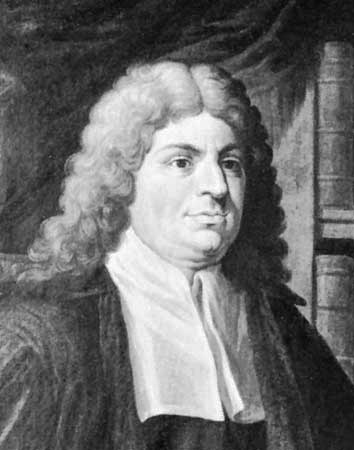
Lorenzo Bellini died 8 January

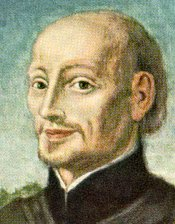
Johann Philipp Jeningen died 8 February

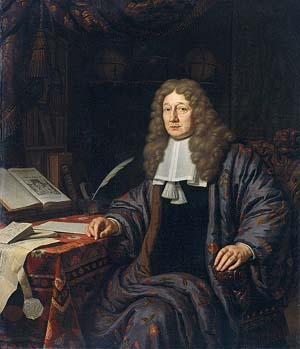
Johannes Hudde died 15 April

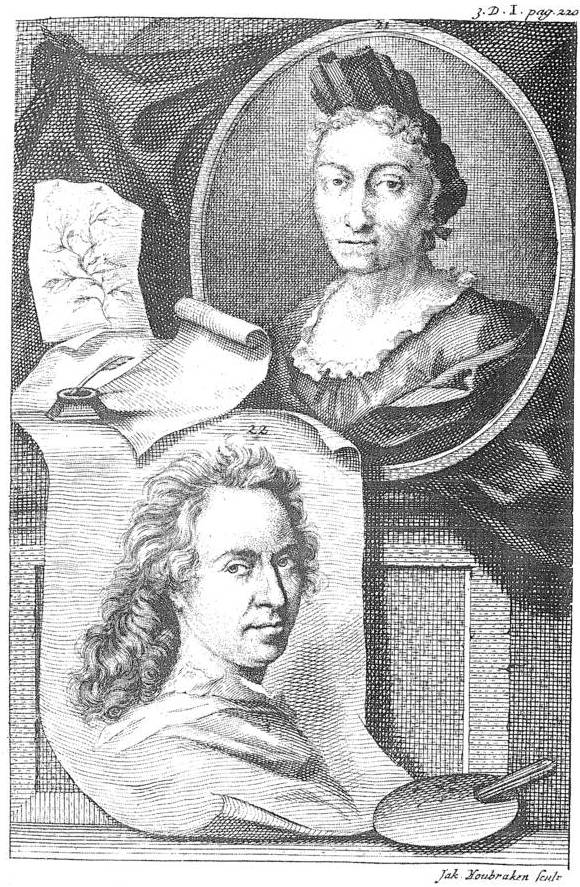
David van der Plas died 18 May

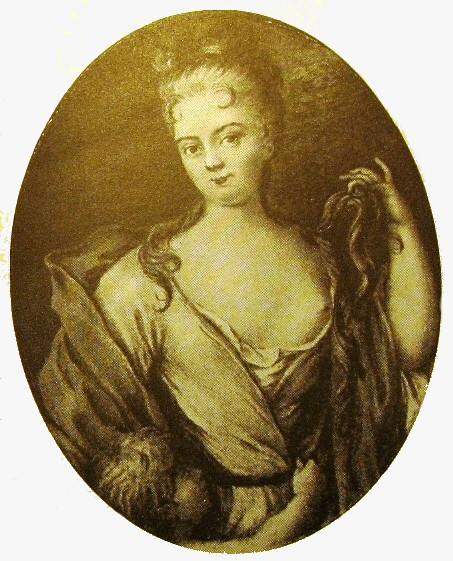
Elisabeth Helene von Vieregg died 27 June

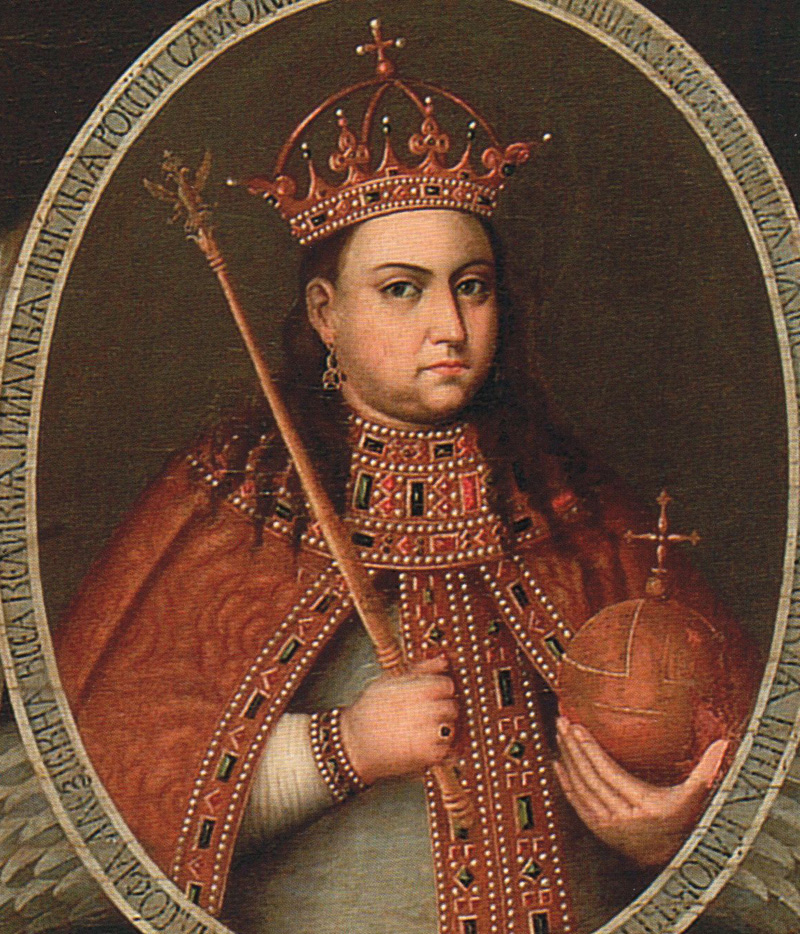
Sophia Alekseyevna of Russia died 14 July

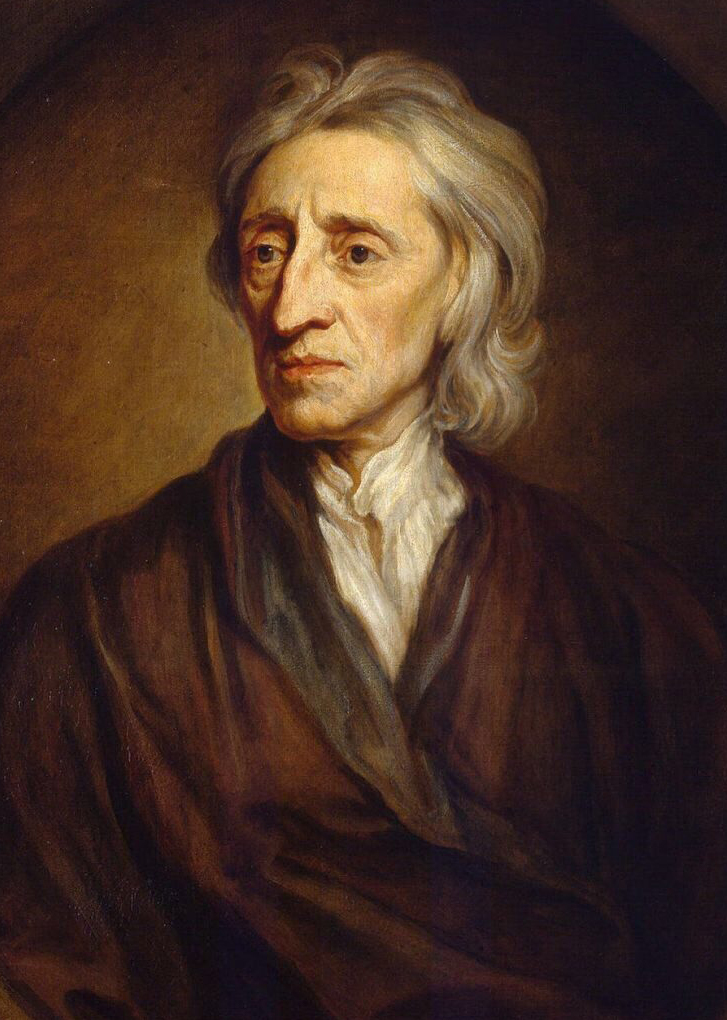
John Locke died 28 October

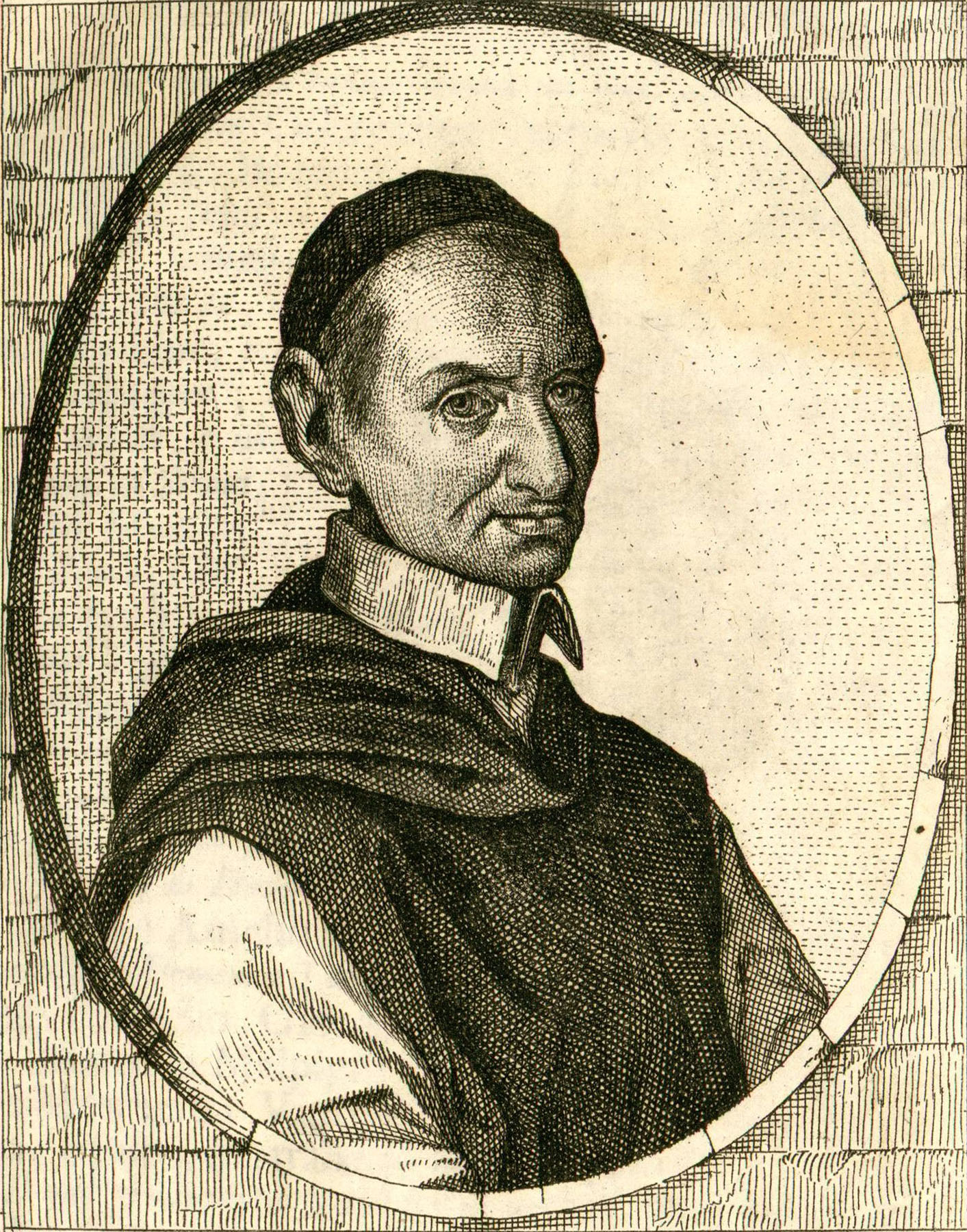
Paolo Boccone died 22 December

=== January–March ===
- January 4 – Giambattista Spinola, Italo-Spanish Catholic cardinal (b. 1615)
- January 8 – Lorenzo Bellini, Italian physician, anatomist (b. 1643)
- January 21
  - Francisco de la Puebla González, Roman Catholic prelate who served as Bishop of Santiago de Chile (1694–1704) (b. 1643)
  - Willem Bastiaensz Schepers, Dutch admiral (b. 1619)
- January 26 – Rudolph Augustus, Duke of Braunschweig-Wolfenbüttel (b. 1627)
- February 2 – Guillaume François Antoine, Marquis de l'Hôpital, French mathematician (b. 1661)
- February 8 – Johann Philipp Jeningen, German Roman Catholic priest from Eichstätt in Bavaria (b. 1642)
- February 18 – Johann Philipp d'Arco (b. 1652)
- February 21 – John Charles, Count Palatine of Gelnhausen, German prince, ancestor of the cadet branch of the royal family of Bavaria (b. 1638)
- February 23
  - Steven Blankaart, Dutch entomologist (b. 1650)
  - Georg Muffat, German composer (b. 1645)
  - Henry Noris, Italian Catholic cardinal (b. 1631)
- February 24 – Marc-Antoine Charpentier, French composer (b. 1643)
- February 25 – Isabella Leonarda, Italian composer (b. 1620)
- March 1 – Joseph Parrocel, French Baroque painter (b. 1646)
- March 6 – Giuseppe Cei, Roman Catholic prelate who served as Bishop of Cortona (1695–1704) (b. 1640)
- March 16 – Deane Winthrop, 6th son of Governor John Winthrop (b. 1623)
- March 17 – Menno van Coehoorn, Dutch military engineer (b. 1641)
- March 31 – Christian Stockfleth, Norwegian civil servant and diplomat (b. 1639)

=== April–June ===
- April 5 – Christian Ulrich I, Duke of Württemberg-Oels, German nobleman (b. 1652)
- April 8
  - Hiob Ludolf, German orientalist (b. 1624)
  - Henry Sydney, 1st Earl of Romney, English politician and army officer (b. 1641)
- April 10 – Wilhelm Egon von Fürstenberg, Bishop of Strassburg (b. 1629)
- April 12 – Jacques-Bénigne Bossuet, French bishop and theologian (b. 1627)
- April 14
  - Thomas Fitch, founding settler of Norwalk, Connecticut (b. 1612)
  - Henderson Walker, Acting Deputy Governor of North Carolina from 1699 to 1704 (b. 1659)
- April 15 – Johannes Hudde, Dutch mathematician and mayor of Amsterdam (b. 1628)
- April 17 – Ulrik Frederik Gyldenløve, leading Norwegian general during the Scanian War (b. 1638)
- April 20 – Agnes Block, Dutch horticulturalist (b. 1629)
- May 3
  - Heinrich Ignaz Franz Biber, Austrian composer (b. 1644)
  - Estephan El Douaihy, Lebanese Maronite Patriarch, historian (b. 1630)
- May 8 – Sir John Cordell, 3rd Baronet, English politician who sat in the House of Commons in 1701 (b. 1677)
- May 12 – Charles Thomas, Prince of Vaudémont (b. 1670)
- May 13 – Louis Bourdaloue, French Jesuit preacher (b. 1632)
- May 15 – Francis Pigott, English Baroque composer and organist (b. 1665)
- May 18 – David van der Plas, Dutch Golden Age portrait painter (b. 1647)
- May 30 – Emmanuel Lebrecht, Prince of Anhalt-Köthen, German prince of the House of Ascania, ruler of Anhalt-Köthen (b. 1671)
- June 13 – Arthur Rose, Scottish minister (b. 1634)
- June 15 – Anna Eriksdotter becomes the last person to be executed for Witchcraft in Sweden. (b. 1624)
- June 18 – Tom Brown, English satirist (b. 1662)
- June 27 – Elisabeth Helene von Vieregg (b. 1679)
- June 30 – John Quelch, English pirate who had a lucrative but very brief career of about one year (b. 1666)

=== July–September ===
- July 2 – John Adolphus, Duke of Schleswig-Holstein-Sonderburg-Plön (b. 1634)
- July 3 – Sofia Alekseyevna of Russia, regent (b. 1657)
- July 7 – Pierre-Charles Le Sueur, French fur trader and explorer (b. c. 1657)
- July 14 – Sophia Alekseyevna of Russia (b. 1657)
- July 17 – Juan Manuel Mercadillo, Roman Catholic prelate who served as Bishop of Córdoba (1695–1704) (b. 1643)
- July 18 – Benjamin Keach, English Particular Baptist preacher (b. 1640)
- July 20 – Peregrine White, first English child born in the Massachusetts Bay Colony (b. 1620)
- July 28 – Juan de Porras y Atienza, Roman Catholic prelate, Bishop of Coria (1684–1704) and Bishop of Ceuta (1681–1684) (b. 1627)
- August 11 – Francis Barlow, English painter (b. c. 1626)
- August 14 – Roland Laporte, French Protestant leader (b. 1675)
- August 19 – Jane Leade, English Christian mystic (b. 1624)
- September 6 – Francesco Provenzale, Italian Baroque composer and teacher (b. 1624)
- September 21 – Maria Antonia Scalera Stellini, 17th-century Italian poet and playwright (b. 1634)
- September 23 – Alessandro Croce, Roman Catholic prelate who served as Bishop of Cremona (1697–1704) (b. 1650)

=== October–December ===
- October 2 – Carlo Barberini, Italian Catholic cardinal and member of the Barberini family (b. 1630)
- October 28
  - John Locke, English philosopher (b. 1632)
  - Goodwin Wharton, British politician (b. 1653)
- October 30 – Princess Frederica Amalia of Denmark, daughter of King Frederick III of Denmark (b. 1649)
- November 1 – John Louis I, Prince of Anhalt-Dornburg, German prince of the House of Ascania (b. 1656)
- November 4 – Andreas Acoluthus, German orientalist (b. 1654)
- November 8 – Tommaso Guzzoni, Roman Catholic prelate who served as Bishop of Sora (1681–1702) (b. 1632)
- November 16 – Chikka Devaraja, fourteenth maharaja of the Kingdom of Mysore from 1673 to 1704 (b. 1645)
- November 20 – Charles Plumier, French botanist (b. 1646)
- November 28 – Countess Palatine Magdalena Claudia of Zweibrücken-Birkenfeld-Bischweiler, daughter of the Count Palatine Christian II (b. 1668)
- December 1 – Joan Huydecoper II, Dutch mayor (b. 1625)
- December 4 – William Byrd I, native of Shadwell (b. 1652)
- December 5 – Louis Hennepin, Roman Catholic priest, missionary of the Franciscan Recollet Order (French (b. 1626)
- December 11 – Roger L'Estrange, English pamphleteer, author (b. 1616)
- December 13 – Gábor Esterházy, Hungarian imperial general and noble (b. 1673)
- December 22
  - Paolo Boccone, Italian botanist from Sicily (b. 1633)
  - Selim I Giray, four times khan of the Crimean Khanate (b. 1631)
- December 27 – Hans Albrecht von Barfus, field marshal in the service of Brandenburg and Prussia (b. 1635)
