= Jean-Jacques de Marguerie =

French naval officer and mathematician (1742–1779)

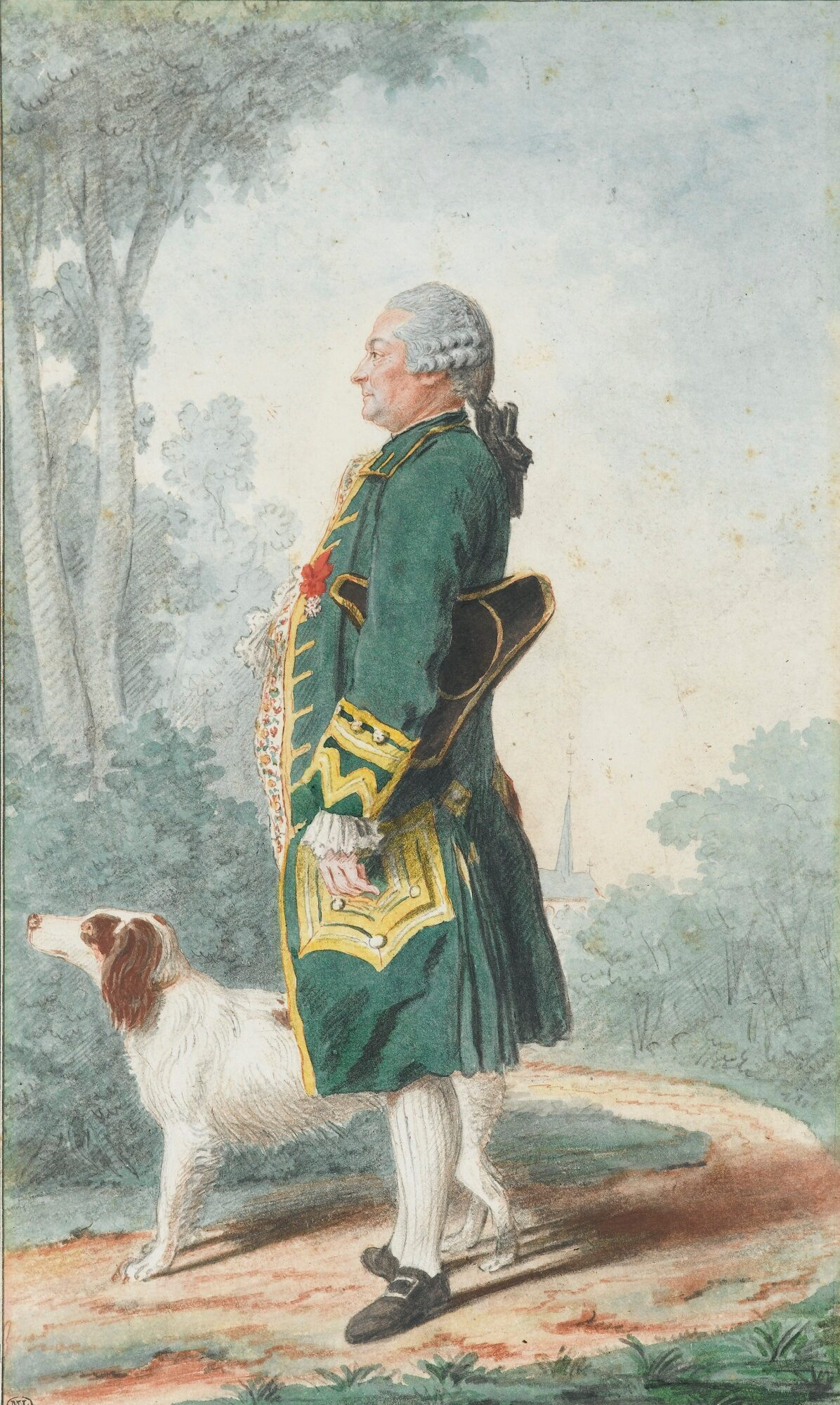
- Jean-Jacques de Marguerie, portrait drawing by Carmontelle
- Born: 12 April 1742; Mondeville
- Died: 6 July 1779 (aged 37); Grenada
- Education: École Militaire
- Occupations: Naval Officer and Mathematician
- Parent(s): Jean Louis Henri de Marguerie (Father) and Cécile Agathe Du Chatel (Mother)
- Awards: Order of Saint Louis

Jean-Jacques de Marguerie (12 April 1742 in Mondeville – 6 July 1779 in Grenada) was a French naval officer and mathematician.

== Life ==
He began his studies at the collège at Caen, discovering Euclid's Elements aged around 18 and soon moving to study mathematics alone. He made such progress in this area that the geometer Alexis Fontaine, whom he met in Paris, offered to become his patron. They edited several papers for the Académie des sciences.

== Bibliography ==
- Mémoire sur la résolution des équations en général, et particulièrement sur l’équation du cinquième degré, 1769
- Mémoire sur le système du monde, 1770
- Mémoire sur une opération d’algèbre appelée l’élimination des inconnues, 1770
- Établissement d’une nouvelle théorie de la résistance des fluides, 1770
- Dissertation sur le roulis, 1771
- Dissertation sur le moyen de trouver les centres de gravité, 1771
- Mémoire sur la résolution des équations du cinquième degré, 1771
- Mémoire sur la construction, 1772
- Mémoire sur la statique des vaisseaux, 1772
