= Mondeville 2 =

French shopping centre

Coordinates: 49°09′53″N 0°17′39″W

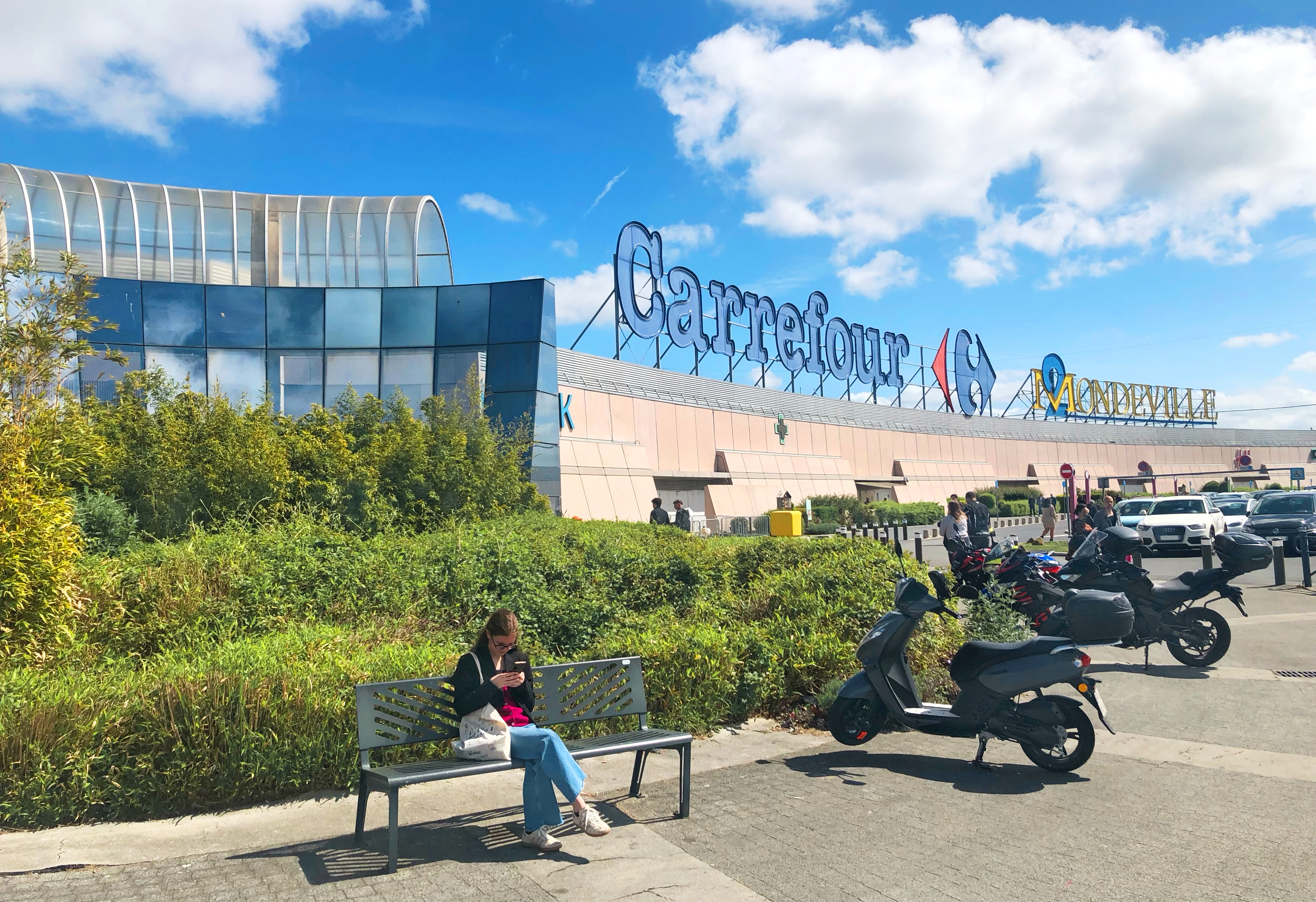
Centre Com Mondeville2, Mondeville, Normandy, France.

Mondeville 2 is a shopping centre in Caen, France, and the largest of the Lower Normandy region. It is situated in the suburb of Caen in the town of Mondeville.

The shopping centre was built by the Promodès group for its supermarket brand Continent and opened on 27 June 1995, replacing the older Supermonde (also known as Mondeville 1) which opened in 1970. It is now operated by the Klépierre group.

Mondeville 2 has a selling area of 60,000 m^{2}, of which 12,000 m^{2} are used by Carrefour. It is home to major French supermarket and stores as well as a UGC Ciné Cité cinema.

Today it attracts approximately 4 million visitors a year.
