= Gisèle Guillemot =

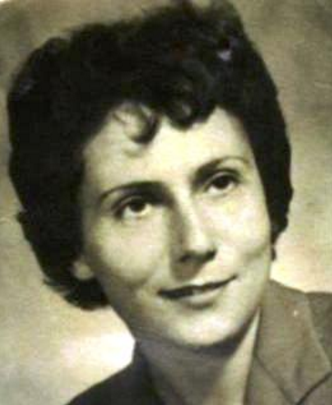
- Gisèle Guillemot
- Born: 24 February 1922; Mondeville, France
- Died: 1 February 2013 (aged 90)
- Military career
- Allegiance: France
- Branch: French Resistance
- Service years: 1940–1945
- Conflicts: World War II

Gisèle Guillemot (French: [ʒizɛl ɡijmo]; 24 February 1922 – February 2013) was an award-winning French writer and a member of the French Resistance during the World War II.

== Early life ==
Gisèle Guillemot was born and brought up at Mondeville in the Calvados region; her mother was from Normandy and her father was Italian.

== Wartime activities ==
Aged 18 when the Germans occupied France in 1940, Guillemot worked as a shorthand typist. She became politically active and was a Communist sympathiser. By spring 1941 she was in charge of the "Front patriotique de la jeunesse" in Calvados. She joined the Francs-Tireurs et Partisans, and was involved in sabotaging German trains during 1942 and 1943. On 9 April 1943 she was arrested, along with other members of her network.

After a trial beginning in June, she was condemned to death on 13 July 1943, along with fourteen men and one other woman, a teacher named Edmone Robert. All their male counterparts were shot, but Guillemot and Robert had their sentences commuted to imprisonment. After a stay at Fresnes Prison, where Guillemot wrote poems in a notebook that she managed to smuggle past the authorities, they were deported to prisons at Lübeck and Cottbus, and finally, under the "Nacht und Nebel" directive, to Ravensbrück concentration camp, where they arrived in the autumn of 1944. After a transfer to Mauthausen-Gusen concentration camp, Guillemot was freed by the International Red Cross on 23 April 1945, and arrived back at Caen on 1 May. Her condition was such that she subsequently spent three months recuperating at a sanatorium in Switzerland.

== Post-war ==
After her return to health, Guillemot campaigned on behalf of the Fédération nationale des déportés et internés résistants et patriotes, which was formed in 1945. She wrote many articles and several books, notably Entre parenthèses, de Colombelles à Mauthausen, which received the Prix François Millepierres from the Académie française in 2002.

== Published works ==
- Une fin d'année à Dantzig, Paris, FNDIRP, 1996 OCLC 411145985.
- Entre parenthèses de Colombelles (Calvados) à Mathausen [sic] (Autriche), 1943-1945, Paris, l'Harmattan, 2001, 279 p. ISBN 2-7475-0561-8
- Des mots contre l'oubli : résistance et déportation, le Struthof, Cabourg, Éd. Cahiers du temps, 2004, 63 p. ISBN 2-911855-65-5.
- Elles... revenir, Paris, Éd. Tirésias, 2006, 60 p. ISBN 978-2-915293-40-1 ; rééd. 2007.
- Résistante : mémoires d'une femme de la Résistance à la déportation, Neuilly-sur-Seine, Michel Lafon, 2009, 209 p. ISBN 978-2-7499-1007-9 ; avec Samuel Humez.
