= Mondeville, Calvados =

Mondeville
- Commune
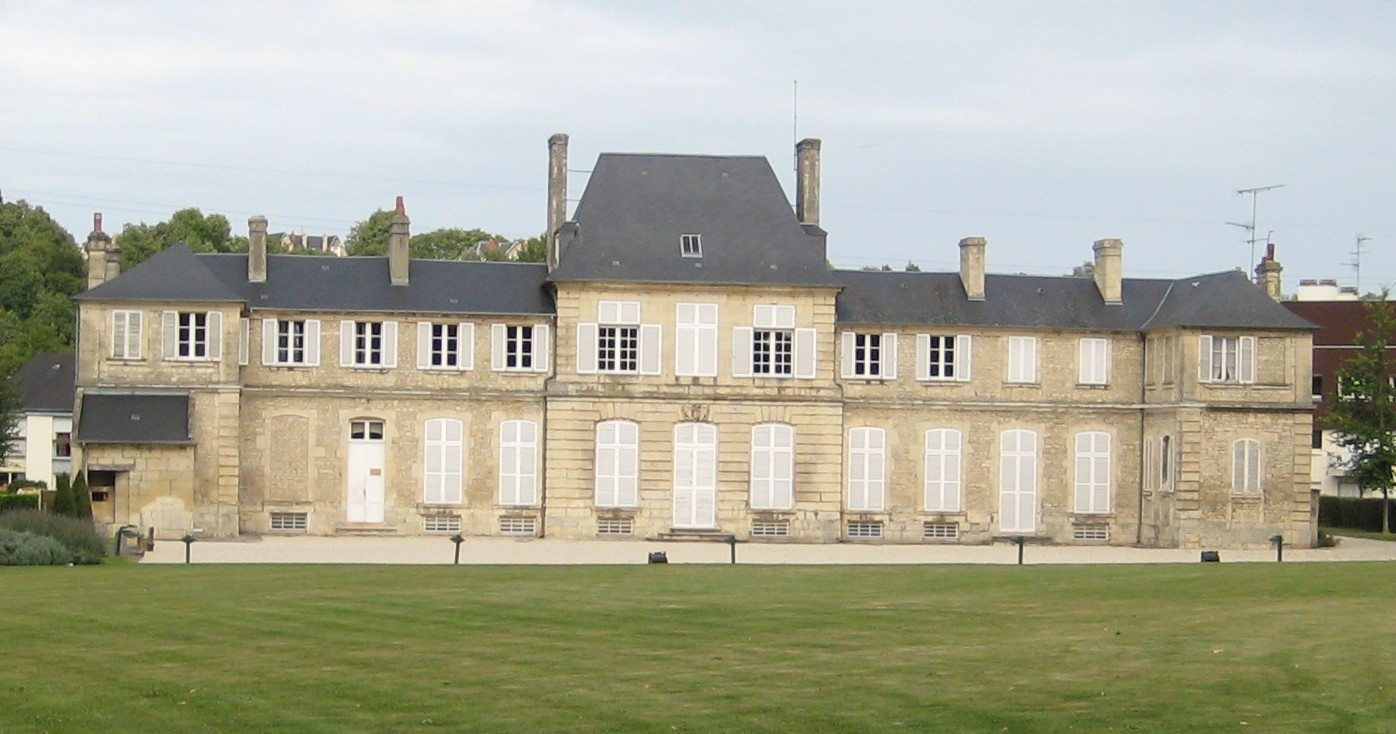
- Chateau of Bellemaist

- Coat of arms
- Location of Mondeville
- Location within France Location within Normandy
- Coordinates: 49°10′29″N 0°19′11″W
- Country: France
- Region: Normandy
- Department: Calvados
- Arrondissement: Caen
- Canton: Ifs
- Intercommunality: Caen la Mer

Government
  - Mayor (2020–2026): Hélène Mialon-Burgat (DVG)
- Area^{1}: 9.05 km^{2} (3.49 sq mi)
- Elevation: 16 m (52 ft)
- Highest elevation: 38 m (125 ft)
- Lowest elevation: 2 m (6.6 ft)
- Population (2023): 10,331
  - Density: 1,140/km^{2} (2,960/sq mi)
- Time zone: UTC+01:00 (CET)
  - Summer (DST): UTC+02:00 (CEST)
- INSEE/Postal code: 14437 /14120
- ^{1} French Land Register data, which excludes lakes, ponds, glaciers > 1 km^{2} (0.386 sq mi or 247 acres) and river estuaries.

Mondeville (French pronunciation: [mɔ̃dvil]) is a commune in the Calvados department in the Normandy région in northwestern France.

== Geography ==
The Commune is made up of the following collection of villages and hamlets, Clopée and Mondeville.

It lies on the river Orne, just east of and adjacent to the city of Caen. In addition a smaller watercourse Le Biez flows through the commune.

== Administration ==
=== Mayors of Mondeville ===
From	To	Name	Party
1977	2008	Jean-Michel Gasnier	Socialist Party
2008	incumbent	Hélène Mialon-Burgat	Miscellaneous left

== Population ==
Historical population

Year	Pop.	±% p.a.
1806	741	—
1836	946	+0.82%
1866	966	+0.07%
1896	1,218	+0.78%
1926	2,628	+2.60%
1954	6,821	+3.47%
1962	9,081	+3.64%
1968	9,788	+1.26%

Year	Pop.	±% p.a.
1975	9,302	−0.72%
1982	9,392	+0.14%
1990	9,488	+0.13%
1999	10,428	+1.06%
2007	10,124	−0.37%
2012	9,604	−1.05%
2017	9,868	+0.54%
2023	10,331	+0.77%

Source: EHESS and INSEE (1968-2023)

== Points of interest ==
=== Museums ===
- Bateaux de Normandie - is a museum, operated by a local maritime history association which is dedicated to traditional Normandy fishing boats. The museum has been open since 2022.

=== National Heritage sites ===
- Église Notre-Dame-des-Prés is a twelfth century church, which as classified as a Monument historique in 1913.

=== Shopping ===
- Mondeville 2 is the largest shopping centre in Lower Normandy and was opened in 1995. Today it attracts up to 4.5million visitors a year.

== Sport ==
USON Mondeville is a football club based in the commune, who play their home games at Stade Michel Farré.

USO Mondeville is a women's basketball club who play their home games at the Halle Bérégovoy.

== Notable people ==
- Jean-Jacques de Marguerie (1742–1779) - naval officer and mathematician who was born here.
- Jean Vallée (1899–1979) - a film director and screenwriter who was born here.
- Gisèle Guillemot (1922–2013) - a writer and a member of the French Resistance during the World War II was born here.

== Gallery ==
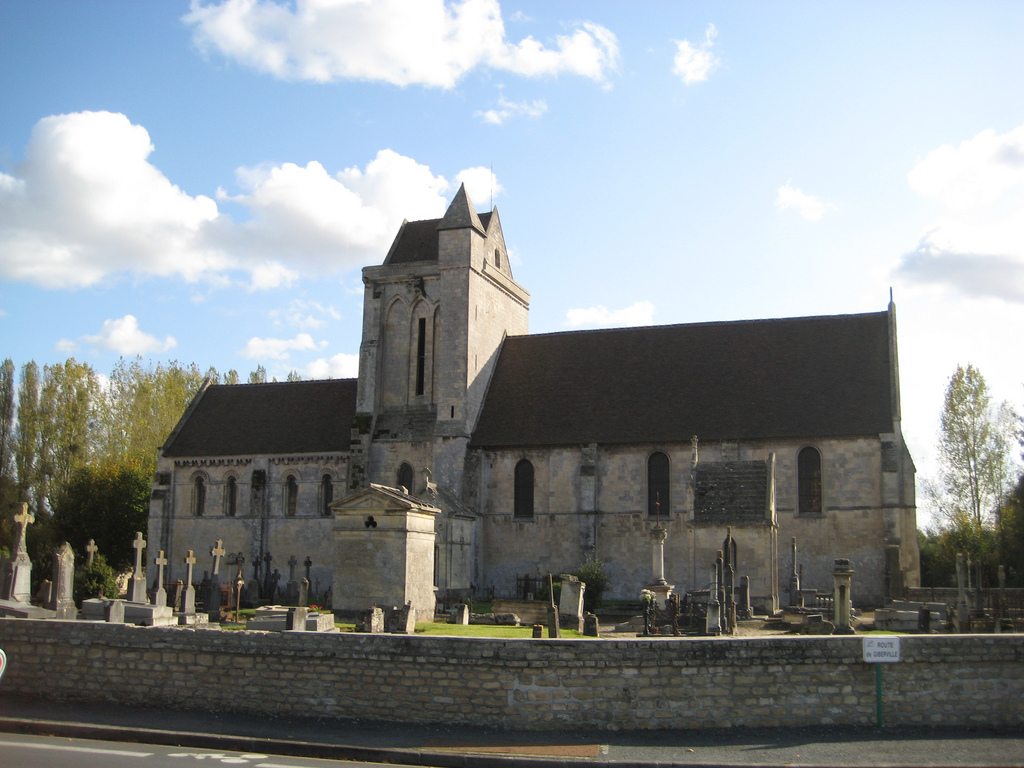
Notre-Dame-des-Prés church

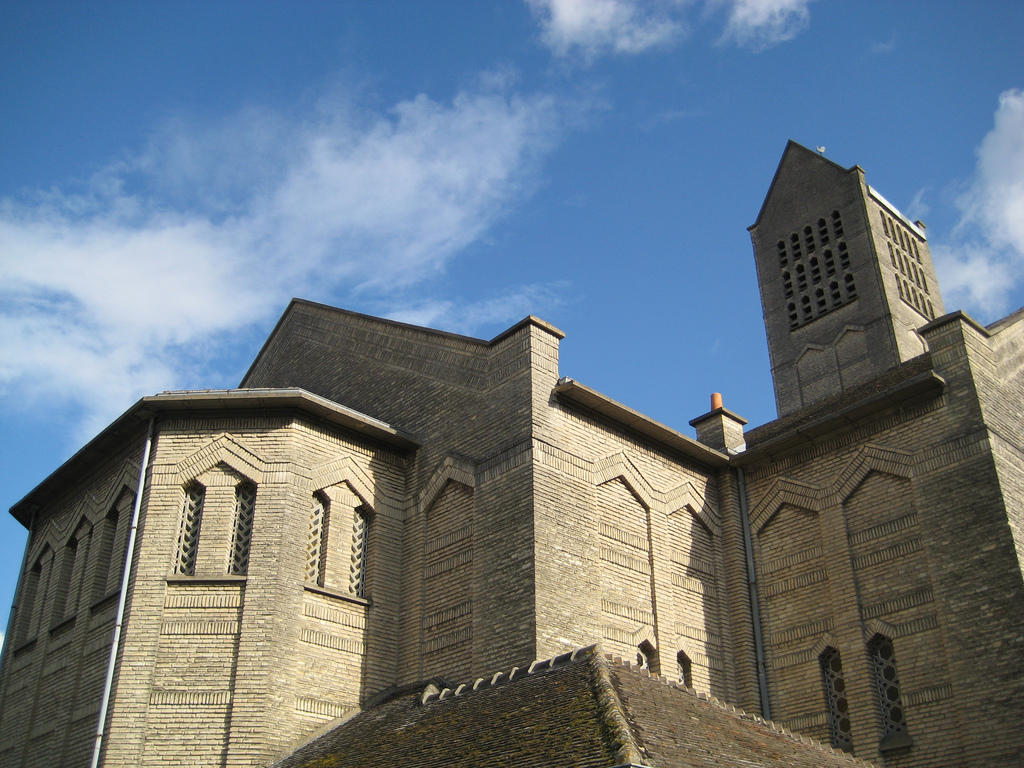
Marie Madeleine Postel church

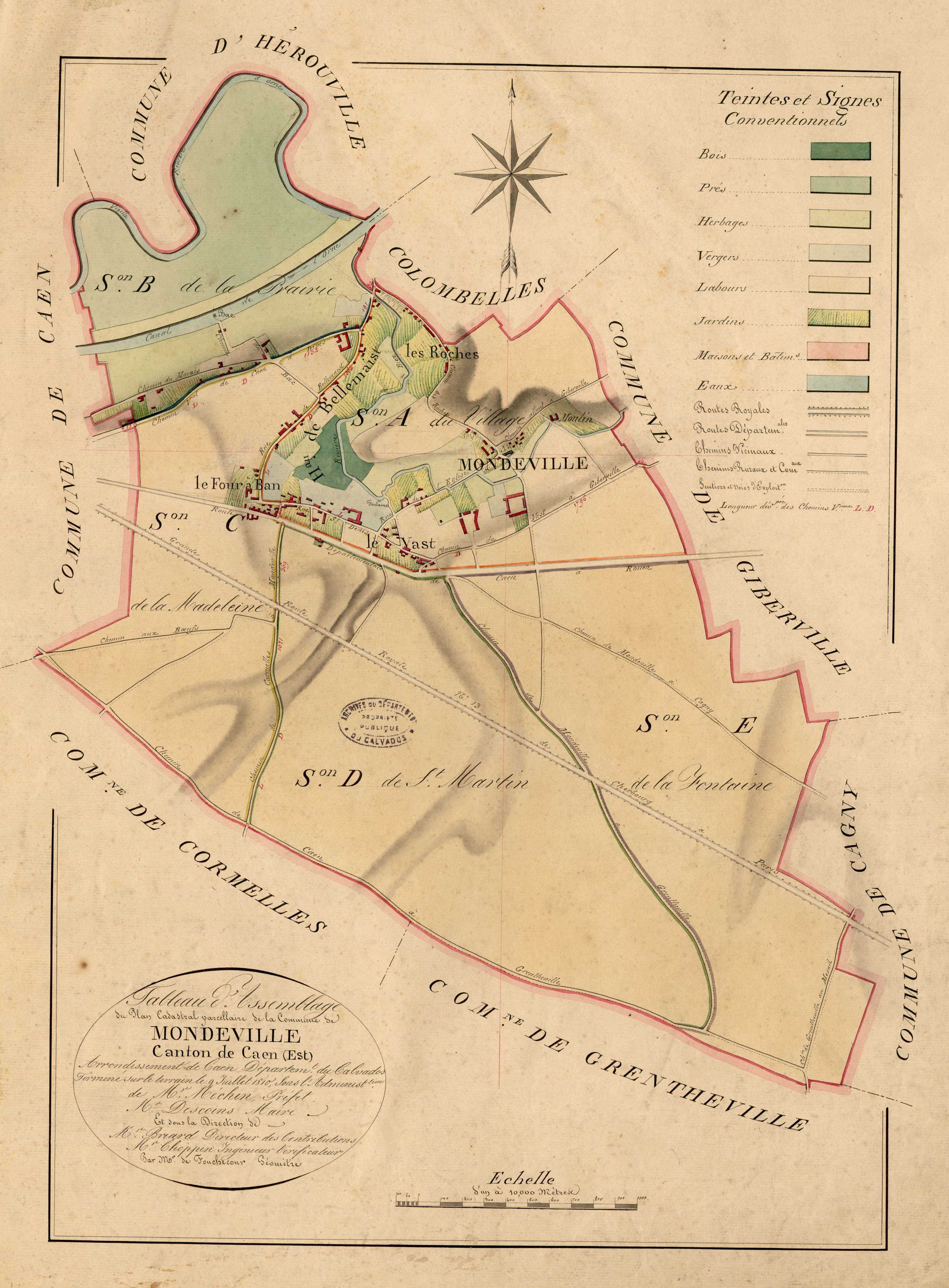
Map from 1810

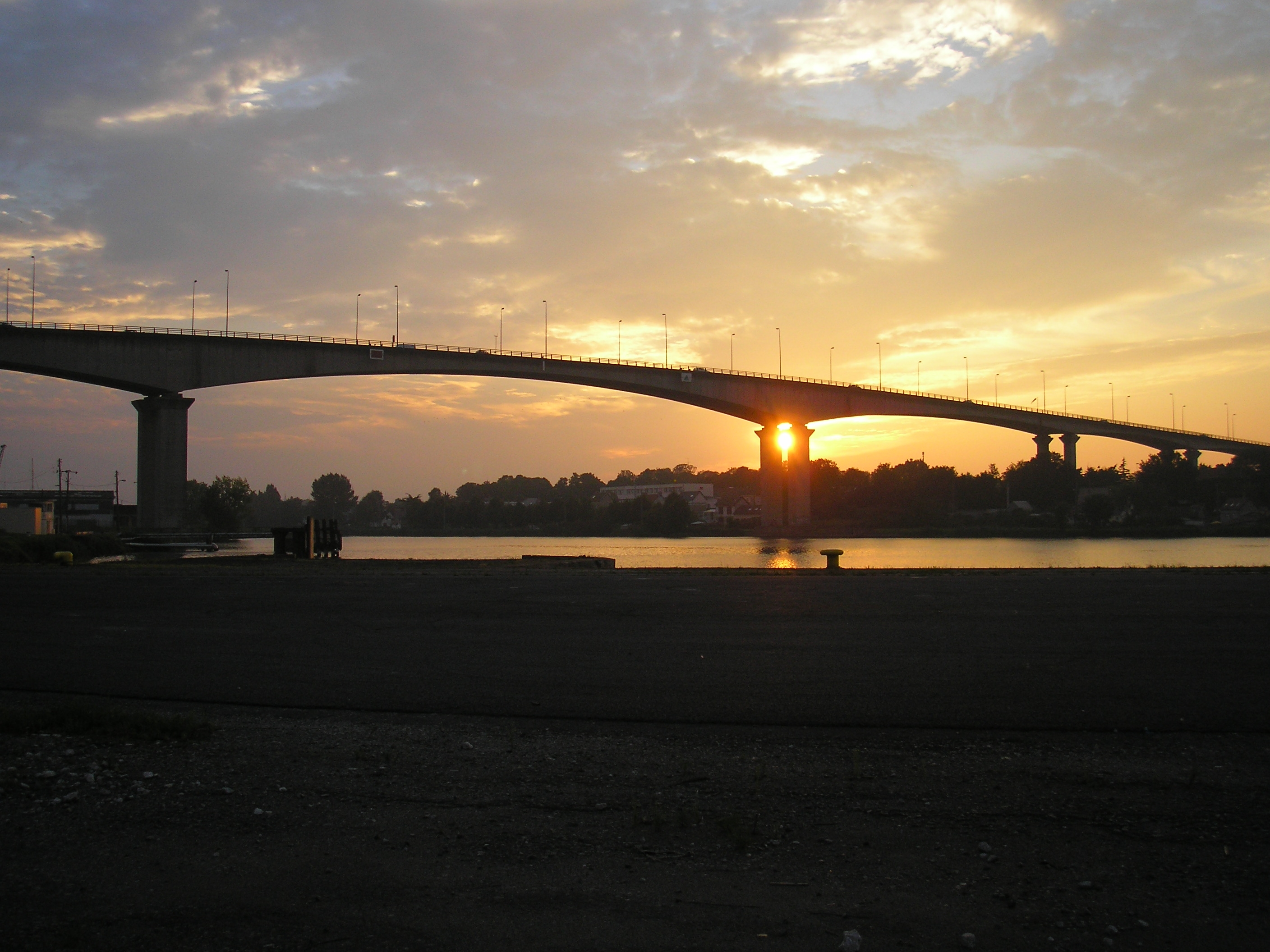
Calix viaduct

== Twin towns – sister cities ==
Mondeville is twinned with:

- Büddenstedt, Germany since 1973
- Northam, England since 1974

== See also ==
- Communes of the Calvados department
