= Jean-Baptiste Chermanne =

Jean-Baptiste Chermanne, Chermane, Chalmagne or Charmannea (17 April 1704 - 14 June 1770) was an 18th-century architect and businessman active in the Southern Netherlands and the Principality of Liège. He was born at Hanzinelle and died at Thuin.

== Bibliography (in French) ==
- Norbert Bastin, « Chermane (Jean-Baptiste) », dans Biographie nationale, t. XXXV, Académie royale des sciences, des lettres et des beaux-arts de Belgique, 1969-1970 (lire en ligne [archive] [PDF]), col. 126-130
- Marc Belvaux, « Jean-Baptiste Chermane (1704-1770 ?) : architecte et entrepreneur d’églises et de châteaux », Le Parchemin, no 432, novembre-décembre 2017, p. 531-549
- Léonce Delterne, « Les monuments religieux de Thuin et leur mobilier », Documents et rapports de la Société royale d'archéologie et de paléontologie de Charleroi, t. LIII, 1968, p. 3-426
