= Aloysius Bellecius =

German Jesuit ascetic author

Aloysius Bellecius (15 February 1704, Freiburg im Breisgau — 27 April 1757, Augsburg) was a Jesuit ascetic author.

== Life ==
Bellecius joined the Jesuits in 1719. During his life as a Jesuit, Bellecius worked in a variety of positions: For some time, he trained missionaries going to India. Later, Bellecius himself spent four years in the Jesuit mission at Marañón (Peru). After his return from Peru, Bellecius became director of the Jesuit seminary at Porrentruy (German: Pruntrut) in the diocese of Basel. In 1750, he became professor of theology at the university of his native town Freiburg. In 1752 he became a teacher in the Jesuit school at Ebersberg. In 1755, Bellecius went to Augsburg where he worked as a parish priest in Augsburg until his death in 1757.

== Works ==
All of Bellecius' works were only published in the final years of his life. He is best known for his "Spiritual Exercise According to the Method of St. Ignatius", which first appeared in 1757. This and other works were translated in many European languages including English, French, German, Italian, Spanish and Polish. The list below only gives the publication data for the Latin originals and for English translations.

- Christianus pie moriens seu adjumenta procurandae bonae mortis. Friburgi Brisgojae 1749.
- Virtutis solidae praecipua impedimenta, subsidia et incitamenta, Ratisbonae 1755.
  - English: Solid Virtue. London 1880; Cincinnati 1882.
- Triduum sacrum. Augustae Vindilicorum et Oenoponti 1757 (an abbreviated version of the previous entry).
- Medulla asceseos seu exercitia S.P. Ignatii de Loyola. Augustae Vindilicorum et Oenoponti 1757.
  - English: Spiritual Exercisise according to the Method of St. Ignatius. Dublin 1876; London 1883.
