= Alexis Fontaine des Bertins =

French mathematician

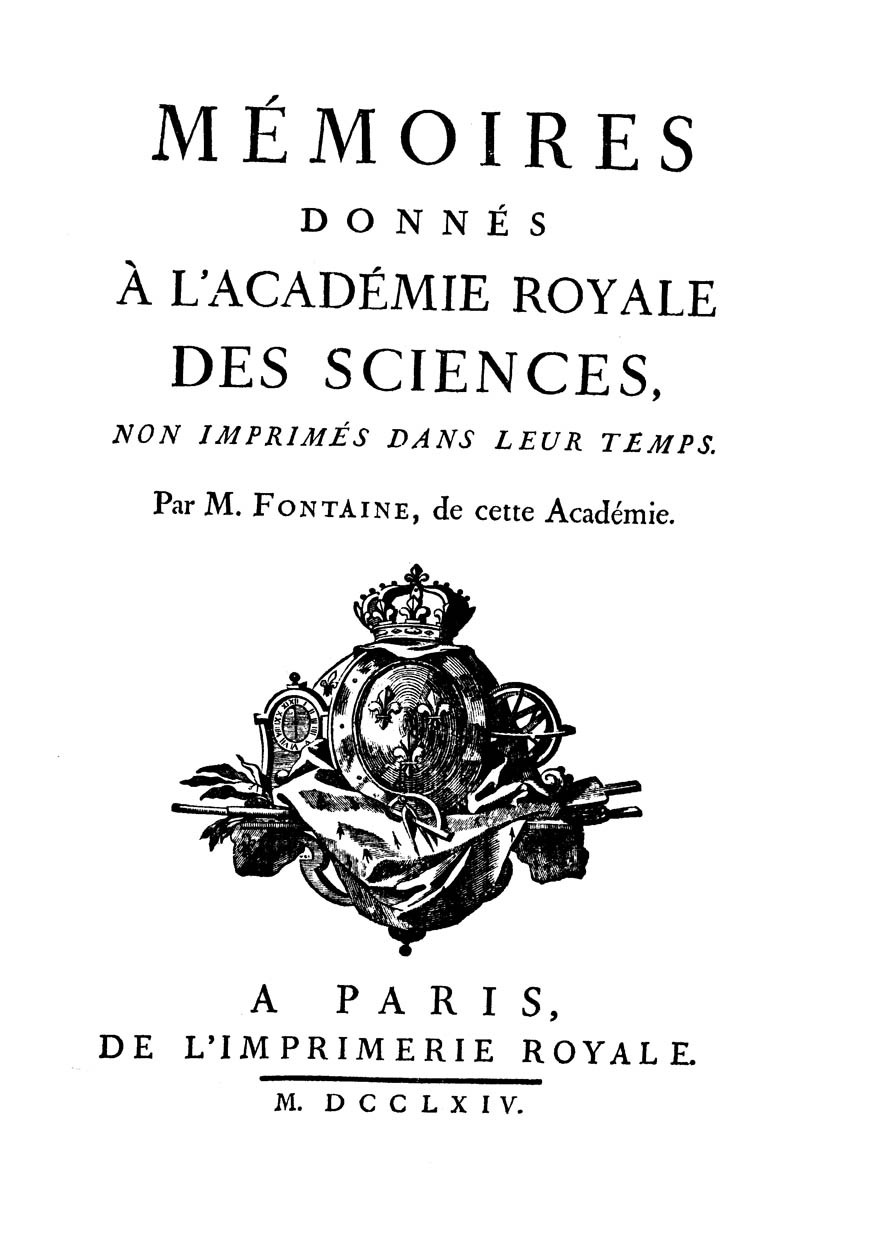
Mémoires donnés à l'Académie royale des sciences, 1764

Alexis Fontaine, known as Alexis Fontaine des Bertins (13 August 1704 – 21 August 1771) was a French mathematician. He was a patron and teacher of Jean-Jacques de Marguerie.

== Life ==
Fontaine was born in Claveyson, Dauphiné. He first got a taste for maths by reading the Géométrie de l'infini of Fontenelle and gave solutions to the problems of the tautochrone curve, the brachistochrone curve and orthogonal trajectories. He was elected a member of the Académie des sciences in 1733. He died, aged 67, in Cuiseaux.

== Publications ==
- Mémoires donnés à l'Académie royale des sciences, non imprimés dans leur temps (1764)
- Traité de calcul différentiel et intégral, par M. Fontaine, de l'Académie royale des sciences, pour servir de suite aux mémoires de la même Académie (1770)
