= Johann Philipp Jeningen =

German Roman Catholic priest

Blessed Johann Philipp Jeningen S.J.
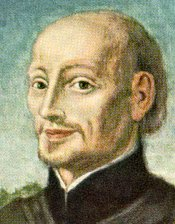

Priest
- Born: 5 January 1642; Eichstätt, Bavaria, Germany
- Died: 8 February 1704 (aged 62); Ellwangen, Baden-Württemberg, Germany
- Venerated in: Roman Catholic Church
- Beatified: 16 July 2022, Marktplatz, Ellwangen, Germany by Cardinal Jean-Claude Hollerich
- Feast: 8 February
- Attributes: Priest's cassock

Johann Philipp Jeningen (5 January 1642 – 8 February 1704) was a German Roman Catholic priest from Eichstätt in Bavaria. He served as a popular missionary at the shrine of Our Lady of Schönenberg and attracted many pilgrims from across the globe.

== Life ==
Johann Philipp Jeningen was born in 1642. He entered the Society of Jesus on 19 January 1663 and was ordained in Eichstätt in 1672. He served his tertianship in Altötting, which gave him experience in caring for pilgrims.

He served at the shrine of Our Lady of Schönenberg, near Ellwangen in Swabia, which had been made famous by the Jesuits. Jeningen, through the renown of his personal holiness, drew pilgrims from near and far. For many years he went forth on missions in the entire neighbouring country. He conducted about fifty missions annually from Ellwangen.

He died in 1704 and is remembered as the "Apostle of the Ries".

== Beatification process ==
Jenginen's spiritual writings were approved by theologians on 2 March 1906. The cause for his beatification was formally opened on 23 March 1945, granting him the title of Servant of God. The Positio - which documented his life of heroic virtue - was sent to the Congregation for the Causes of Saints in 1983 and resulted in Pope John Paul II proclaiming him to be Venerable on 21 December 1989.

A miracle attributed to them was investigated on a local level from 7 November 2011 until 10 May 2013.
