= Charles Gautier de Vinfrais =

French officer of the Royal venery

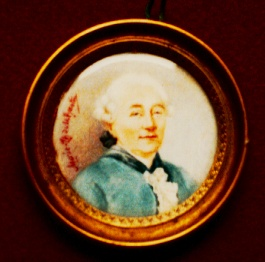
- Anonymous miniature
- Born: 7 November 1704; Saint-Germain-en-Laye
- Died: 4 November 1797 (aged 92); Versailles
- Occupations: Hunter; Encyclopédiste
- Spouse: Marie Elisabeth Pelletier

Charles Gautier de Vinfrais, better known under the name Vinfrais l'ainé, (7 November 1704 – 4 Novembre 1797) was an 18th-century French officer of the Royal venery.

Long a huntsman of King Louis XV with whom he hunted regularly, Vinfrais wrote the article Vénerie for the 16th volume of the Encyclopédie, comprehensive on the organization and history of Royal Hunts, informative, but poorly organized, absolutely devoid of any critical spirit and silent on the social costs of hunting on the peasantry of his time.

== Bibliography ==
- Eugène Chapus, Les Chasses princières en France de 1589 à 1841, Hunting, 1853
- Jules Henri D. de Tardy, Le Particule nobiliaire,
- Annie Becq, L'Encyclopédisme - Actes Du Colloque de Caen, 12–16 January 1987
