= Johann Friedrich Cartheuser =

German physician and naturalist (1704–1777)

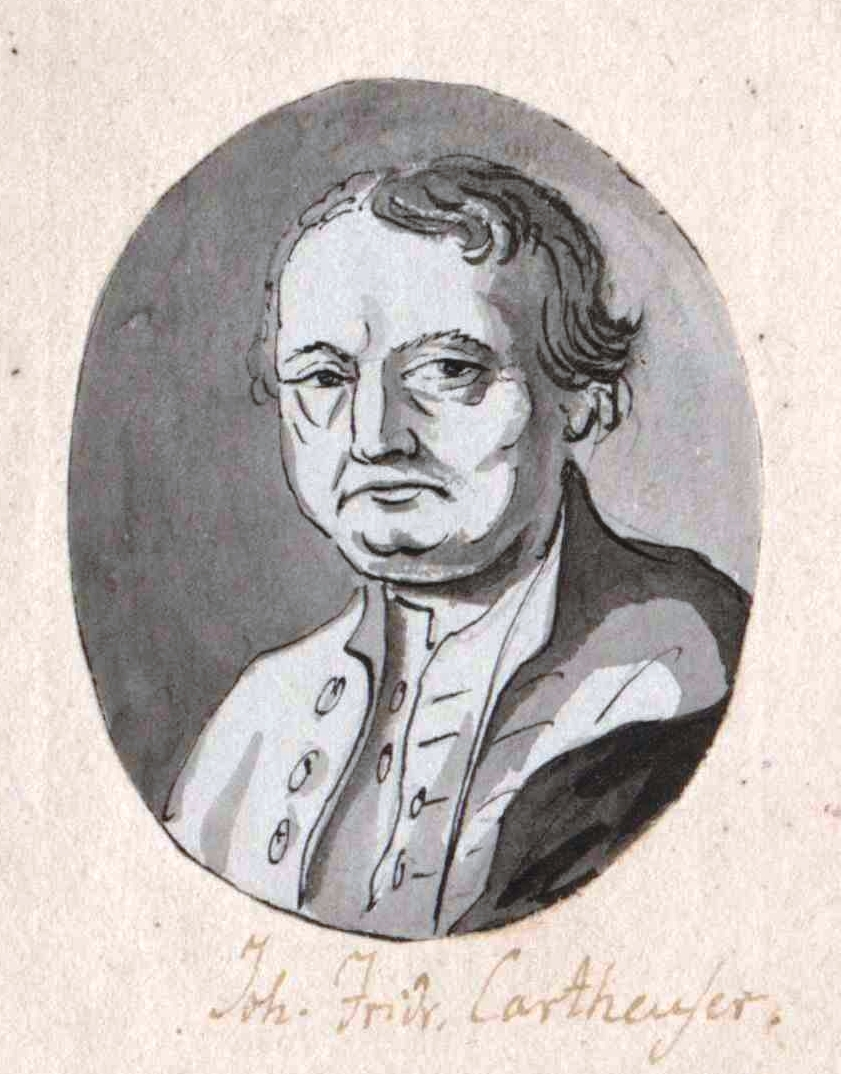
Johann Friedrich Cartheuser (1704–1777)

Johann Friedrich Cartheuser (September 29, 1704 – June 22, 1777) was a German physician and naturalist.

== Biography ==
Cartheuser was born at Hayn. He studied medicine first at Jena and afterward at Halle, where he took the degree of doctor in 1731. He was appointed in 1740 professor of chemistry, pharmacy, and materia medica at the university of Frankfurt an der Oder, and shortly afterward to the chair of anatomy and botany. Still later he was named professor of pathology and therapeutics. He was also appointed rector of the university, and continued to hold his appointments till his death. He was made a member of the academy of sciences, Berlin, in 1758. He died at Frankfurt an der Oder, aged 72.

His chief merit consists in having introduced the method of submitting the various substances of materia medica to a strict ordeal of chemical analysis. He analyzed a great number of plants and other substances, and gave an exact account of the elements which enter into their composition.

== Works ==
- Elementa Chymiæ Medicæ Dogmatico-experimentalis (Halle, 1736)
- Fundamenta Materiæ Medicæ Generalis et Specialis (2 vols., Frankfurt, 1749–50) Digital edition by the University and State Library Düsseldorf
- De Morbis Endemicis Libellus (Frankfurt, 1772)
